= List of environmental conflicts =

The Environmental Justice Atlas documented 3,100 environmental conflicts worldwide as of April 2020 and emphasised that many more conflicts remained undocumented.

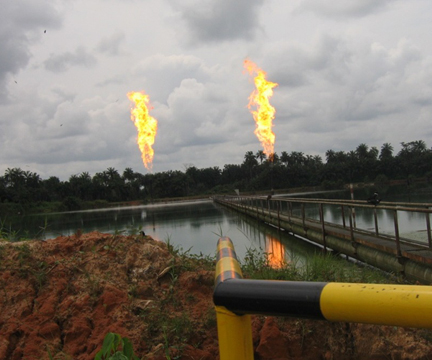
Gas flaring and oil spills in the Niger Delta contribute to local conflict.

Climate activists blockade British Airports Authority's headquarters for day of action.

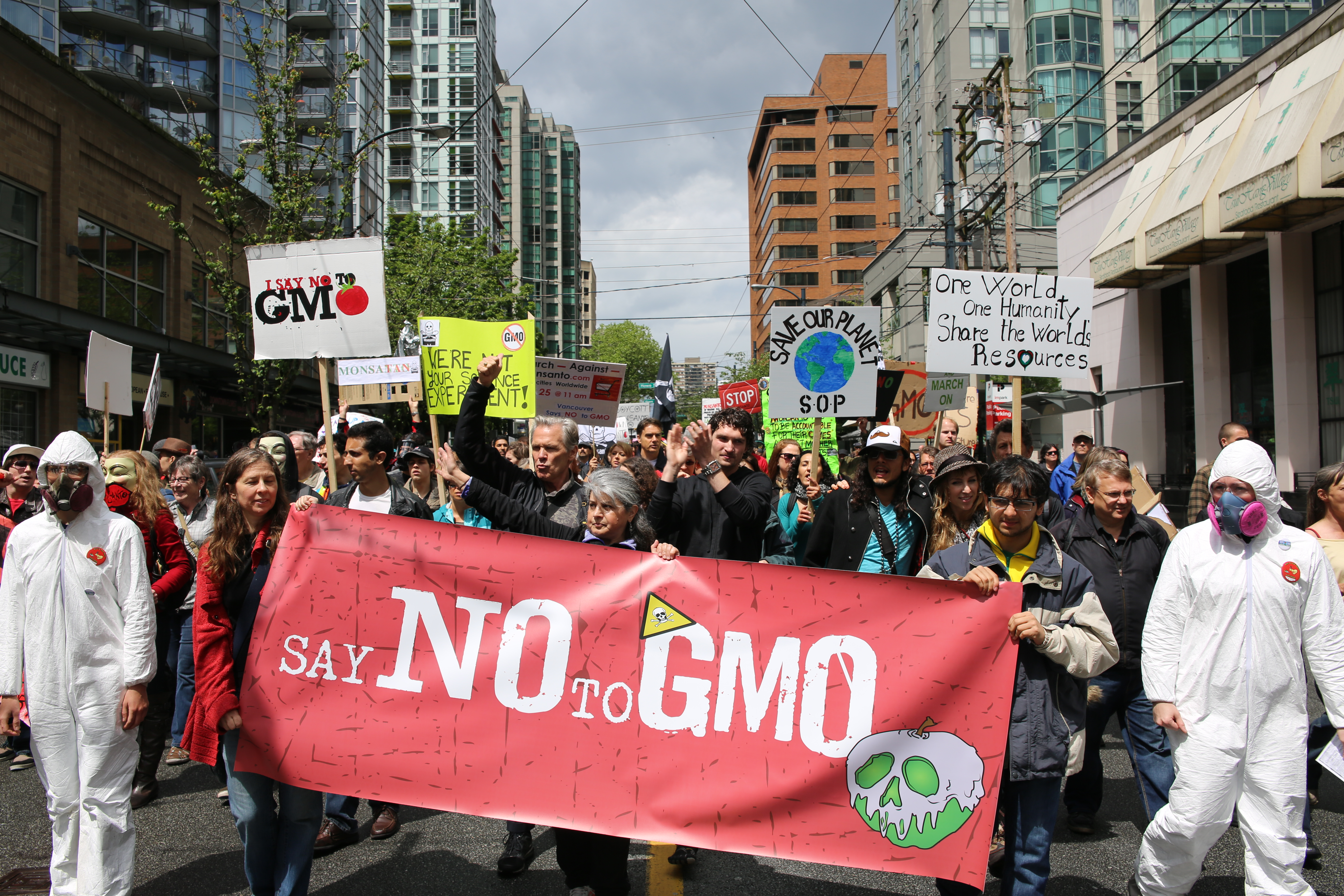
March Against Monsanto, Vancouver, Canada; 25 May 2013

== Climate ==
- Global Climate March
- Global Day of Action
- March Against Monsanto
- March for Science (2017)
- People's Climate March (2014)
- People's Climate March (2017)
- School strike for climate / Fridays for Future (FFF) (2018–)
  - September 2019 climate strikes
- Stop Climate Chaos
- Say Yes demonstrations
- March for Science Portland
- Camp for Climate Action
- End Fossil - Occupy!

== Mining ==
- Antamina mine
- Akyem mine
- Ashio Copper Mine
- 2000 Baia Mare Cyanide spill
- Bajo de la Alumbrera mine
- Chirano Gold Mine
- Famatina mining protests
- Fruta del Norte mine
- Garzweiler surface mine
- Konkola Copper Mines
- La Colosa mine
- Lake Natron
- Las Bambas copper mine
  - 2015 Peruvian protests against Las Bambas mining project
- El Chanate
- Conflict minerals
- Cuajone mine
- Dairi mine
- Dolores mine
- Escobal mine protests
- Fenix Nickel Project
- Himpunan Hijau
- Kabwe mine
- Kamoto mine
- Kenticha mine
- Lega Dembi mine
- Los Pelambres mine
- Marange diamond fields
- Marikana massacre
- Mirador mine
- Mrima Hill mine
- Mutanda mine
- Nchanga Copper mine
- Ok Tedi Mine
- Phosphorite War
- Pueblo Viejo mine
- QMM mine
- Tilwezembe mine
- Rennell Island bauxite mine
- Resolution Copper (Oak flat)
- La Revancha mine
- Rio Tinto massacre
- Roșia Montană protests
- Rovina mine
- San Carlos Panantza mine
- Shifang protest
- Thacker Pass lithium mine
- Toquepala mine
- Toroku arsenic disease
- Uranium mining on Navajo reservations
- 2010 Xinfa aluminum plant protest
- Xolobeni mine
- Yanacocha gold mine

== Fossil fuels ==
- Amuay tragedy
- Arun gas field
- Bayou Bridge Pipeline protests
- Block 5A, South Sudan
- Cassurubá Extractive Reserve
- Chevron Richmond Refinery
- Coastal GasLink pipeline
  - 2020 Candainan pipeline and railway protests
- Corrib gas controversy
- Dakota Access Pipeline protests
- Grassy Mountain Coal Project
- Hambach Forest
- Karachaganak Field
- Keystone pipeline
- Lago Agrio oil field
- 2012–2014 Romanian protests against shale gas
- Environmental issues in the Niger Delta
  - Movement for the Survival of the Ogoni People
- Natural gas in Papua New Guinea
- Pungarayacu oil field
- Rio de Janeiro Petrochemical Complex
- Stop Line 3
- Trans Mountain pipeline

== Renewables ==
- Bedford Biofuels
- Lake Turkana Wind Power Station
- Lamu Wind Power Station
- Ngodwana Biomass Power Station

== Timber and agriculture ==
- Indigenous rainforest blockades in Borneo
- Chipko movement
- Fairy Creek timber blockade
- Grassy Narrows road blockade
- Gurindji Strike
- Mau Forest
- Pesticide incidents in the San Joaquin Valley
- Prey Lang Wildlife Sanctuary
- Chico Mendes
- Green Belt Movement

== Toxic waste ==
- Agbogbloshie
- Cancer Alley
- China PX protests
- Grassy Narrows mercury poisoning
- Electronic waste in Guiyu
- Four Big Pollution Diseases of Japan
- Jinkanpo Atsugi Incinerator
- 2005 Huashui protest
- Kokuba River
- Love Canal protests
- Qidong protest
- Khian Sea waste disposal incident
- North Carolina PCB Protest, 1982
- Washington Works
- Dupont Chambers Works
- The Lafarge-Holcim cement factory in Montcada i Reixac (Catalonia)
- Prestige oil spill
- Deepwater Horizon oil spill

== Infrastructure and urban development ==
- 2011 Bolivian indigenous rights protests
- Basque Y
- Ciudad Real International Airport
- Eurovegas
- Fehmarn Belt fixed link
- Gezi Park protests
- Green Bans
- Hands off our Forest
- Heathrow airport expansion
- High Speed 2
- Homes before Roads
- Lamu Port and Lamu-Southern Sudan-Ethiopia Transport Corridor
- List of road protests in the UK and Ireland
- Nairobi Southern Bypass Highway
- Oka Crisis
- Parc Olympique Lyonnais
- Port of Granadilla
- Runway 18 West
- Stop Cop City
- Stuttgart 21
- Contested Infrastructure in France (catégory)

== Dams and water conflicts ==
- Agua Zarca dam
- Belo Monte dam
- Bhakra Dam
- Bujagali Hydroelectric Power Station
- Chico River dam
- Flint water crisis
- Hatgyi Dam
- Rasi Salai Dam
- Sardar Sarovar Dam
- Save Manapouri Campaign
- Plachimada Coca-Cola struggle
- Sơn La Dam
- Tagus-Segura Water Transfer
- Tellico Dam
- Tipaimukh Dam
- Cochabamba Water War
- Les Soulèvements de la Terre
- Yali Falls Dam
- Yortanlı Dam

== Nuclear ==
- Almaraz Nuclear Power Plant
- Anti-WAAhnsinns Festival (1980s)
- Chernobyl disaster
- Cofrentes Nuclear Power Plant
- Fukushima Daiichi disaster
- ITER
- Kyshtym disaster
- Meuse/Haute Marne Underground Research Laboratory
- Nuclear industry in South Australia
  - Kupa Piti Kungka Tjuta
- Nevada Desert Experience
- Nuclear-free protests in New Zealand (1960 - 1980)
- Nuclear programme of South Africa
- Zwentendorf Nuclear Power Plant

== Disasters ==
- Bhopal disaster
- Hurricane Katrina
- San Juanico disaster

== Conservation and tourism ==
- Pirin National Park
- Serengeti National Park
- Sun Peaks Resort
- Tablas de Daimiel National Park

== See also ==
- Anti-nuclear protests
- Blockadia
- Environmental activism
- Environmental racism
