= Restrepia restrepoi =

Scientific classification
- Kingdom: Plantae
- Clade: Embryophytes
- Clade: Tracheophytes
- Clade: Spermatophytes
- Clade: Angiosperms
- Clade: Monocots
- Order: Asparagales
- Family: Orchidaceae
- Subfamily: Epidendroideae
- Genus: Restrepia
- Species: R. restrepoi

Binomial name
- Restrepia restrepoi E.Restrepo & E.Parra

Species of flowering plant

Restrepia restrepoi is a species of flowering plant in the family Orchidaceae. It is an epiphyte with leathery leaves, light yellow flowers, and capsule fruits. The species is endemic to Colombia, and was described in 2025.

== Taxonomy ==
Eugenio Restrepo and Edicson Parra-Sánchez described Restrepia restrepoi in 2025. The type material was collected by Restrepo and David Edwards in 2024, from the Colombian department of Valle del Cauca.

The species' placement within Restrepia is uncertain, as it has characteristics of both subgenus Restrepia, and subgenus Ecmeles.

== Distribution ==
Restrepia restrepoi is native to the wet tropical biome of Colombia. It is endemic to montane rainforests in the western Colombian Andes, and is known from three locations.

Restrepia restrepoi grows as an epiphyte on trees, near roads or trails, and alongside other orchid species, including Restrepia brachypus, Dracula chimaera, Dichaea andina, Lepanthes trimerinx, Lepanthes sanjuanensis, Lepanthes stellaris, and Telipogon mayoi.

== Description ==
Restrepia restrepoi is an epiphytic orchid that grows up to 35 centimetres (14 in) tall. The stems are erect, 12–24 centimetres (4.7–9.4 in) tall, and encased by a thin, brown-spotted sheath.

The leaves are leathery, ovate-elliptical, 7.2–8.1 centimetres (2.8–3.2 in) long, and 2.8–3.4 centimetres (1.1–1.3 in) wide. The leaf stem is around 3 millimetres (0.12 in) long.

The flowers are light yellow, and often cleistogamous. The dorsal sepal is oblong. The lateral sepals are fused into a synsepal, which is around 7.5 millimetres (0.30 in) long, and 5.4 millimetres (0.21 in) wide. The petals are translucent, and have yellow edges. The lip is magenta-yellow, rose-coloured at the base, oblong, around 4.8 millimetres (0.19 in) long, and around 2.2 millimetres (0.087 in) wide. The inflorescence stems are around 2 millimetres (0.079 in) long. Restrepia restrepoi has been observed flowering from February to May.

The fruits are oblong capsules, around 7.9 centimetres (3.1 in) long.

Restrepia restrepoi is morphologically similar to Restrepia chrysoglossa and Restrepia flosculata, though only R. restrepoi has cleistogamous flowers.

== Etymology ==
The species is named after Eugenio Restrepo Hoyos, a Colombian entrepreneur and the father of Eugenio Restrepo. The name is "dedicated to him as an act of gratitude."
