= Mining in Ecuador =

Mining in Ecuador was slow to develop in comparison to other Latin American countries, in spite of large mineral reserves. As late as 2012, according to the United Nations, Ecuador received less foreign direct investment per person than any other country in Latin America. During the 1980s, mining contributed only 0.7 percent to the Ecuadorian economy and employed around 7,000 people. Minerals were located in regions with little to no access, hindering exploration. Ecuador has reserves of gold, silver, copper, zinc, uranium, lead, sulfur, kaolin and limestone. The latter practically dominated the early industry as it was used in local cement plants.

Gold, which was largely forgotten since its early exploitation in the sixteenth century, regained momentum in the 1980s. Ecuador was exporting 2.4 tons per year by 1987, which was mostly discovered in the southern Sierra region, as well as the southeastern province of Zamora-Chinchipe.

In 1985 Ecuador's Congress passed a new law to encourage foreign exploration and investment that simplified regulation and offered higher financial incentives and lower taxation for investors, while also establishing the Ecuadorian Institute of Minerals (Instituto Ecuatoriano de Minería—Inemin) under the Ministry of Energy and Mines.

Mining has contributed to environmental conflict in Ecuador; and Indigenous-led popular uprisings have made demands for Indigenous consultation on mining projects and increased protection for land and water. During 2012, Indigenous leaders organised a two week march to the capital in protests of mining concessions granted to China. In the absence of any state enforcement, many communities located near the extraction site have taken a different approach towards opposing mining by creating a group of Indigenous guardians. In 2017, members of the A'i Cofán of Sinangoe began to police their ancestral land near the Colombian border in the northern Ecuadorian province of Sucumbíos to suspend mining concessions. They use drone footage, camera traps, GPS spots, and mapping to identify places and locate threats. On the other hand, in June 2022, protestors used a physical approach halting production at Mirador copper mine by blockading entry roads as part of a larger national uprising that made multiple demands on the Ecuadorian government, including a moratorium on the expansion of mining and oil projects.

According to a report by the Organization of American States, illegal gold mining and gold exports have increased in Ecuador since the COVID pandemic as the value for an ounce of gold hasn't dropped below $1,500. “Corruption of public officials, particularly at the local level, and insufficient government presence in mining areas also contribute to illegal gold-mining activity.” As of February 2023, illegal gold mining has devoured 1,600 hectares (4,100 acres) of forest, according to the Amazon Andes Monitoring Project (Maap). Many of the territories in which mining is done lack formal state recognition, making them more vulnerable to illegal mining. At the same time, the formal sector has grown by 34% between January and November 2022 to $2.5 billion, with the government expecting it to reach at least $4 billion by 2025.

== Mining Reform under Correa (2007-17) ==
Policies during President Rafael Correa's first six years in office slowed mining activity, despite his plans to develop the industry. A mining law passed in 2008 set ambiguous standards for mining contracts, requiring mining companies to negotiate royalty payments with the government. Analysts concluded that the lack of clarity in the legislation would discourage foreign investment. A later mining law passed on 13 June 2013 made Ecuador much more lucrative for foreign investors, imposing an 8% ceiling on the previously open-ended royalties and reducing windfall taxes that had led mining companies to withdraw from the Fruta del Norte gold mine.

Soon after the 2013 law had passed, it was reported that several indigenous groups in opposition of large-scale mining planned to take their cases to the international courts later in the year. Led by Carlos Perez, Ecuador's Confederation of Peoples of Kichwa Nationality (ECUARUNARI) had already filed a domestic lawsuit. Perez said, "Mining activity affects our ancestral territories. We will do everything to defend our land and our people. We will go to the Human Rights Commission and, if necessary, to the Inter-American Court of Human Rights, asking for protective measures." The Confederation of Indigenous Nationalities of Ecuador (CONAIE) "also filed a suit before the constitutional court asking for a law to carry out prelegislative consultation for people that could be affected by mining." Their president, Humberto Cholango, didn't rule out going to the international courts.

== Copper and silver mining ==
=== Mirador ===
The Mirador mine is a large copper mine located in the Amazonian province of Zamora-Chinchipe in southern Ecuador. It is one of the largest copper reserves in Ecuador, and the first industrial-scale copper project to be developed in the country. The project has generated an environmental conflict that is emblematic in the national political debate on mining.

The project is owned and operated by Ecuacorriente S.A. (ECSA), a subsidiary of the state-owned Chinese company CRCC-Tongguan Investment Co. Ltd, which comprises Tongling Nonferrous Metals Group Holdings Co. Ltd. and China Railway Construction Corp. Ltd.

Development of the Mirador mine was opposed by the Confederation of Indigenous Nationalities of Ecuador (CONAIE), leading to the 2012 Ecuadorian protests. The first shipment of copper from the mine was exported to China in January 2020. Production at the mine was halted in June 2022 when access roads were blocked during widespread Indigenous-led protests that made several demands of the Ecuadorian government including a moratorium on oil and mining projects.

=== San Carlos-Panantza ===
The San Carlos Panantza mine is a large copper mine located in the south of Ecuador in Zamora-Chinchipe Province. San Carlos-Panantza is one of the largest copper reserves in Ecuador and in the world having, estimated reserves of 600 million tonnes of ore grading 0.59% copper. The mine is in the Corriente copper belt along with the Mirador mine. It is being developed by ExplorCobres S.A., a subsidiary of the state-owned Chinese company CRCC-Tongguan Investment Co. Ltd which is also developing Mirador.

Operations were halted at San Carlos Panantza by Indigenous Shuar resistance in late 2020. The mine's opposition demands consultation with Indigenous people and protection of water; foreign investment in Ecuador's mining industry has been opposed before, during the 2012 Ecuadorian protests.

== Gold mining ==
The Fruta del Norte deposit is the largest gold deposit in Ecuador. The deposit is part of the Corriente Copper Belt located in the Amazon province of Zamora-Chinchipe.

In 2006 Aurelian Resources discovered a large deposit at Fruta del Norte, estimated between 6.8 and 10 million ounces of gold and between 9.1 and 14 million ounces of silver. Following changes to Ecuadorian mining laws that limited foreign ownership of mining projects, the Canadian company Kinross Gold acquired Aurelian Resources in 2009 and took on the project. Despite the project's potential, and just days before Congress passed a new mining law in 2013, Kinross pulled out of Ecuador after a dispute over windfall taxes, reporting a loss of $720 million. In 2014 Kinross sold its entire interest in the project to Fortress Minerals Corporation. The company was renamed Lundin Gold and the Fruta del Norte deposit went into production in 2019.
