= 2012 in the environment =

This is a list of notable events relating to the environment in 2012. They relate to environmental law, conservation, environmentalism and environmental issues.

== Events ==
- A list of the world's 100 most threatened species - a compilation of the most threatened animals, plants, and fungi - was published.
- The first period emission reduction commitments under the Kyoto Protocol expired at the end of 2012. A second commitment period was agreed to at the 2012 United Nations Climate Change Conference.

=== January ===
- Armed commandos will be ordered to protect endangered tigers in India's Bandipur and Nagarhole national parks.
- The Guangxi cadmium spill contaminated the Guangxi Longjiang river and water supply.

=== February ===
- The Atlantic sturgeon is classified as an endangered species by the US National Marine Fisheries Service.

=== March ===
- Protests in Ecuador in opposition to the copper mining concessions in the province of Zamora-Chinchipe begin with a series of demonstrations by indigenous peoples.
- As a result of Deepwater Horizon litigation BP agrees to pay out $7.8 billion to plaintiffs affected by the 2010 Deepwater Horizon oil spill.
- The formation of Limmen National Park in Australia's Northern Territory is announced.

=== April ===
- Protests are held at the site of the proposed Baram Dam in the Malaysian state of Sarawak on the island of Borneo.
- The Sustainable Biofuels Bill, introduced into the New Zealand Parliament by the Green Party, was defeated on its second reading.

=== May ===
- The Mokihinui Hydro project in New Zealand is cancelled. There had been opposition on the basis that it would result in changes to recreation and flooding of historic sites and high value conservation land.

=== June ===
- The United Nations Conference on Sustainable Development is scheduled to be held 20–22 June in Rio de Janeiro, Brazil. It is a follow-up to the ground-breaking 1992 Rio Summit.
- The Jardim Gramacho landfill in the Brazilian city of Duque de Caxias closed after 34 years of operation. It was one of the largest landfills in the world.
- "Lonesome George", possibly the last remaining Pinta Island tortoise, dies in captivity. It is thought to have lived for 100 years.

=== July ===
- Planning for the 2012 Summer Olympics has included environmental policies such as conservation measures, renewable energy options and biodegradable packaging.
- The Qidong protest against a proposed waste water pipeline occurred in the Chinese city of Qidong, Jiangsu province.
- The Shifang protest occurred in the southwestern Chinese city of Shifang, Sichuan province, against a copper plant that residents feared posed environmental and public health risks.
- The Canadian Environmental Assessment Act, 2012 went into effect (until 2019).

=== November ===
- At the 2012 United Nations Climate Change Conference it was decided to extend the Kyoto Protocol through to 2020. Wording adopted by the conference incorporated for the first time the concept of "loss and damage", an agreement in principle that richer nations could be financially responsible to other nations for their failure to reduce carbon emissions.

== See also ==
- List of protected areas established in 2012
- Human impact on the environment
- List of environmental issues
- List of years in the environment
