= Corriente Resources =

Corriente Resources Inc.
- Company type: Private
- Industry: Mining
- Founded: 1992
- Headquarters: Vancouver, Canada; 49.285220°N 123.116452°W; Quito, Ecuador; 0.178517°S 78.479419°W
- Key people: Jin Shouhua, Chairman (CEO); Li Dongquing (Senior VP)
- Products: Copper
- Number of employees: 98 (2008)
- Website: www.corriente.com

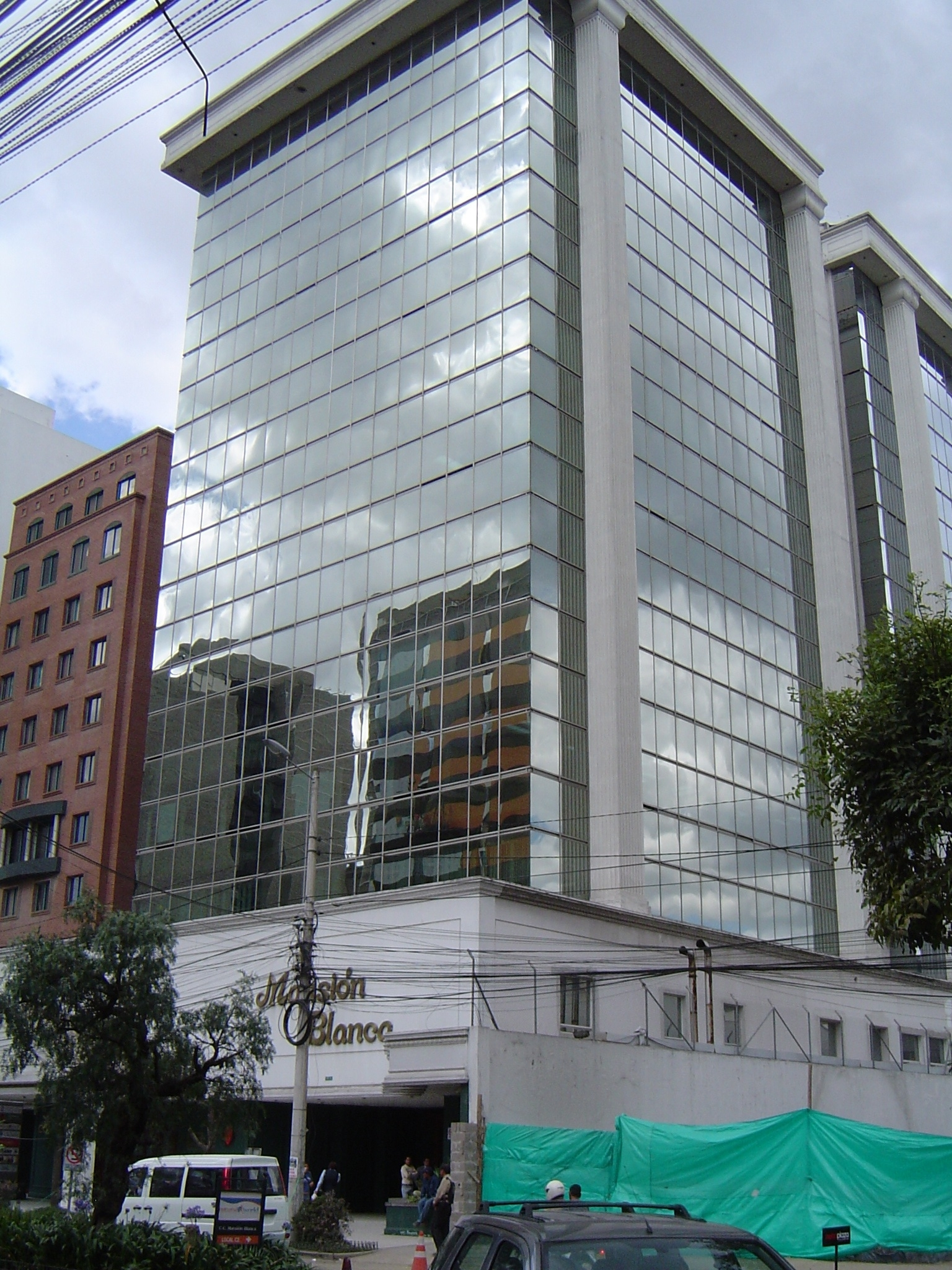
Corriente Resources' office in the Mansión Blanca Building in Quito.

Corriente Resources was a multinational corporation based in Canada that completed feasibility studies and environmental impact assessments (EIA) for open-pit copper mines in the Ecuadorian rainforest, including the Mirador mine. The Mirador mine is the first industrial scale copper mine to be developed in Ecuador. Corriente Resources also completed explorations of the San Carlos Panantza mine, although development of that project was halted in 2020 by Indigenous opposition.

The EIA for Mirador mine was approved in 2006, and a feasibility study for 30,000 tonnes per day production of copper-gold concentrate was completed in 2008. In 2010, the company was taken over by state-owned Chinese companies Tongling Nonferrous Metals Group Holdings Co. Ltd. and China Railway Construction Corp. Ltd. through their jointly owned subsidiary CRCC-Tongguan Investment Co. Ltd.

Chinese companies began construction of Mirador mine in 2012, investing approximately $1.4 billion into the project and exporting the first shipment of copper from the mine to China in 2019. Agreements between China and Ecuador to develop the project met with popular resistance and led to protests in 2012 led by the Confederation of Indigenous Nationalities of Ecuador.

== History ==
Corriente Resources was incorporated in 1992. About 2000, it entered into an agreement with BHP Billiton, buying mining concessions in the Amazon rainforest in Ecuador.

Through a community relations campaign, Corriente Resources was able to win over many of the inhabitants of the area that will be affected by the mine, spending money. However, in 2006 a local resistance movement was formed, which then took some mining camps. Another group of locals, supported by the corporation, resisted the take, and there was a fistfight.

Due to its economic power, Corriente Resources not only has influenced Ecuadorian president Rafael Correa, but also local authorities in Zamora Chinchipe and Morona Santiago provinces, where the corporation operates. In early 2009, during a demonstration against the corporation in the town of San Miguel de Conchay in Morona Santiago, the village chief, Hernán Samaniego, issued a death threat against Vicente Zhunio, one of the copper mine's opponents.

== Mirador Project ==
Mirador is Corriente Resources' main project in Ecuador. It is located on coordinates 3.570046°S 78.434687°W, near the town of Gualaquiza on the western slope of the Cordillera del Cóndor mountain range.

Corriente Resources plans to extract 30 thousand tonnes of copper ore per day for about 17 years, producing a sum total of 145 million tonnes of waste, which will be dumped near the open pit, in the middle of the rainforest. Corriente Resources believes it will use 10 thousand cubic meters of water per day, an amount equivalent to the water used by 20 thousand people in Ecuador's cities daily. Corriente Resources plans to build a dam near the Quimi River to hold the water produced by the mine.

Corriente Resources plans to invest $533 million upfront.

To export the copper, Corriente Resources will build port facilities in Puerto Bolívar on the Pacific coast of Ecuador, 250 miles from the mine.

In July 2009, Corriente Resources announced it had gotten the go ahead from the Environment Ministry and the Water Department of Ecuador to begin digging the open-pit mine.

== Substantial Shareholders ==
The following own 5 percent or more of Corriente Resources' stock:

Name	Occupation	Business Address	Share of Stock
CRCC-TONGGUAN INVESTMENT (CANADA) CO., LTD.	Offeror owns 78,922,393 Common Shares of Corriente representing 100% of the Common Shares of Corriente	800 West Pender Street Suite 520; Vancouver, BC V6C 2V6	100 http://www.corriente.com/media/PDFs/news/2010/20100804-CRIPressRelease.pdf
