= Curipamba project =

- Location within Ecuador
- Location: near Las Naves, Bolívar and Los Ríos Province, Ecuador; 1.29°S 79.31°W
- Products: Copper, Silver, Gold
- Company: Adventus Mining Corp and Salazar Resources (joint venture)

The Curipamba project, also known as the El Domo deposit or the El Domo mine, is a planned mine in Ecuador.

== Description ==
The Curipamba project is a planned open-pit copper, silver, and gold mine located near Las Naves in both Bolívar. and Los Rios provinces in central Ecuador. It is located in the Andes mountain range and covers 21,500 hectares.

It is owned by Canadian company Adventus Mining Corp and Salazar ResourcesDevelopment of the mine has been opposed by anti-mining activists including the National Anti-Mining Front and the Confederation of Indigenous Nationalities of Ecuador.

The mine owners plan to process 1,850 tons per day when the mine opens.

== History ==
A feasibility study of the mine's productivity was completed in 2021. At that time, owners had invested $248m into the venture. In January 2022, Adventus Mining Corp and Salazar Resources created a joint venture to explore the mine.

Armed protestors attempted to thwart the mine owner's assessments in mid July 2023. Police provided protection to the mine's staff. Ten protestors and three police officers were reported as injured in the protests.

In late July 2023, the mine's owners completed the social and environmental assessments of opening the mine.

On 31 July 2024 Adventus was bought by Silvercorp for $200m.

== See also ==
- Mining in Ecuador
