= Restrepia santanderensis =

Scientific classification
- Kingdom: Plantae
- Clade: Embryophytes
- Clade: Tracheophytes
- Clade: Angiosperms
- Clade: Monocots
- Order: Asparagales
- Family: Orchidaceae
- Subfamily: Epidendroideae
- Genus: Restrepia
- Species: R. santanderensis

Binomial name
- Restrepia santanderensis N.Gut. & Gil-Amaya

Species of flowering plant

Restrepia santanderensis is a species of flowering plant in the family Orchidaceae. It is an epiphyte with leathery leaves and capsule fruits. The flower is in an inverted position, solitary, and yellow.

Restrepia santanderensis was described in 2023. It is native to, and named after, the Santander Department of Colombia.

== Taxonomy ==
Restrepia santanderensis was described in 2023. The type specimen was discovered in La Belleza, Santander, near the top of a waterfall.

== Distribution ==
Restrepia santanderensis is native to the wet tropical biome of Colombia. It was first reported from the Santander Department. The species occurs in a small area of the eastern Andes.

== Description ==
Restrepia santanderensis is an epiphyte that grows up to 24 centimetres (9.4 in) tall. The stems are 2–13 centimetres (0.79–5.12 in) long, covered by white, papery sheaths with brown spots. The roots are slender.

The leaves are elliptic-ovate, leathery, 4.5–11.2 centimetres (1.8–4.4 in) long, and 2.2–4.3 centimetres (0.87–1.69 in) wide. The leaf base is twisted into a short stem.

The inflorescence is up to 3.9 centimetres (1.5 in) long, and grows on a 2–2.7 centimetres (0.79–1.06 in) stem. The stem has a 9.2–9.9 millimetres (0.36–0.39 in) spathe. The inflorescence has a single yellow flower.

The flower is up to 2.5 centimetres (0.98 in) long, and in an inverted position because the stem is twisted 180 degrees. The sepals are pale yellow and membranous. The dorsal sepal is narrow ovate, slightly concave, has five veins, and contracts into a long tail. The lateral sepals are somewhat striped, slightly concave at the base, 22–25 millimetres (0.87–0.98 in) long, 7.35–7.8 millimetres (0.289–0.307 in) wide, and have seven veins each. The petals are translucent, yellow, narrowly linear-triangular, membranous, and have three veins. The petals are 11–11.6 millimetres (0.43–0.46 in) long, and 1–1.2 millimetres (0.039–0.047 in). The lip is yellow, with a rose and white base, rectangular, 7.6–10.9 millimetres (0.30–0.43 in) long, 2.3–3.6 millimetres (0.091–0.142 in) wide, and has three veins. The base of the lip is slightly concave.

The column is greenish-white, and 4.6–6.1 millimetres (0.18–0.24 in) long. The fruit is a dehiscent capsule around 1.5 centimetres (0.59 in) long.

Restrepia santanderensis is similar to Restrepia flosculata and Restrepia mendozae, which both have short inflorescences and small to medium yellow flowers.

== Etymology ==
Restrepia santanderensis is named after Colombia's Santander Department.
