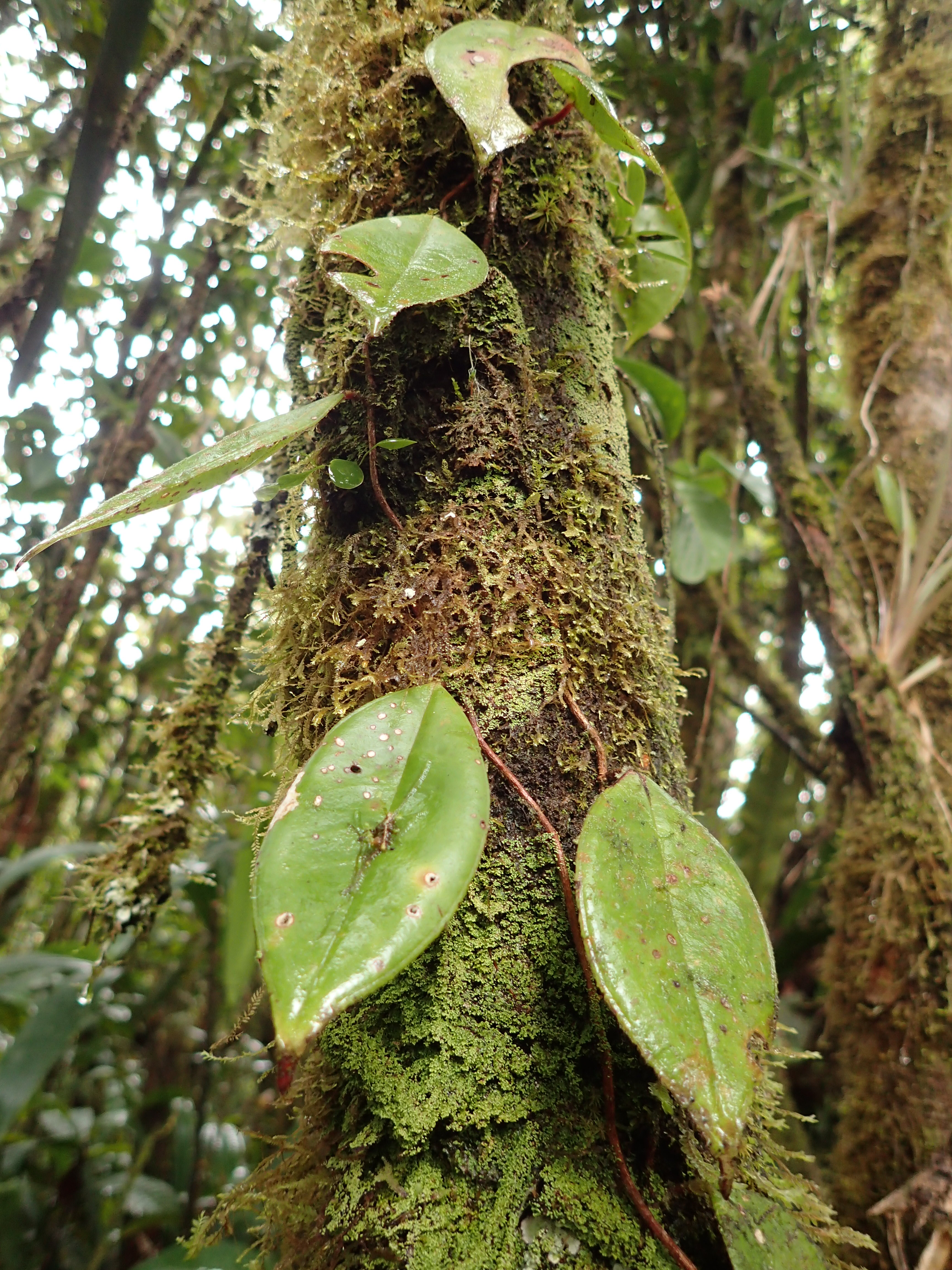
- Phainantha shuariorum in the Cordillera del Condor.

Scientific classification
- Kingdom: Plantae
- Clade: Tracheophytes
- Clade: Angiosperms
- Clade: Eudicots
- Clade: Rosids
- Order: Myrtales
- Family: Melastomataceae
- Genus: Phainantha; Gleason

= Phainantha =

Genus of flowering plants

Phainantha is a small genus of herbaceous climbers restricted to South America. It is a disjunct genus containing five species, four of which are found in the Guyana Shield tepuyes region while the fifth is endemic to the Cordillera del Condor in Ecuador.

== Species ==
- Phainantha laxiflora (Triana) Gleason
- Phainantha maguirei Wurdack
- Phainantha myrteoloides Wurdack
- Phainantha shuariorum C.Ulloa & D.A.Neill
- Phainantha steyermarkii Wurdack
