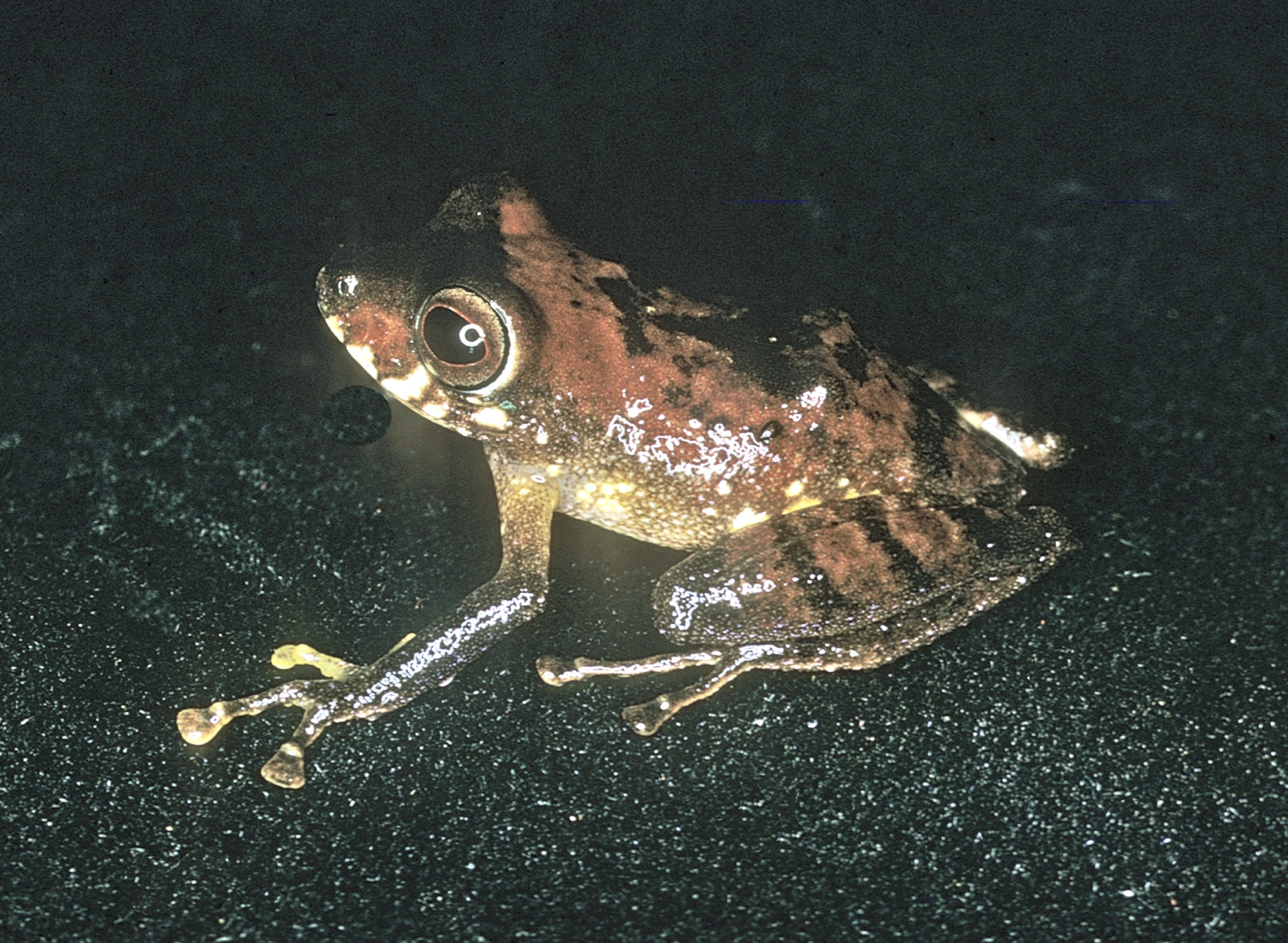

Conservation status
- Least Concern (IUCN 3.1)

Scientific classification
- Kingdom: Animalia
- Phylum: Chordata
- Class: Amphibia
- Order: Anura
- Clade: Brachycephaloidea
- Family: Craugastoridae
- Genus: Pristimantis
- Species: P. quaquaversus

Binomial name
- Pristimantis quaquaversus (Lynch, 1974)

Synonyms
- Eleutherodactylus quaquaversus Lynch, 1974

= Pristimantis quaquaversus =

Species of frog

Pristimantis quaquaversus is a species of frog in the family Strabomantidae. It is found on the lower Amazonian slopes of the Andes from northern Ecuador south to the Cordillera de Cutucú and Cordillera del Cóndor as well as the adjacent northern Peru.

== Description ==
Pristimantis quaquaversus are relatively small frogs, with males measuring 20–23 mm (0.79–0.91 in) in snout–vent length and females 25–31 mm (0.98–1.22 in). Dorsum has shagreen skin that is pale brown to reddish brown in colour, with darker brown interorbital bar, chevrons or spots. Upper eyelid has a conical tubercle. Fingers and toes have discs but no webbing.

== Habitat ==
The natural habitats of Pristimantis quaquaversus are tropical cloud forests and humid lowland forests. They can be seen on low vegetation at night. It is a common frog facing no major threats.
