= List of protected areas established in 2012 =

Below is a list (in the form of a statistical table) of the protected areas that were officially established as such in the year of 2012. The table contains each place's/park's/monument's name, country in which the corresponding place/park/monument is located, and the total approximate area that the corresponding place/park/monument covers.

For United States National Park Service units, they are listed by acres, rather than by hectares.

Name of place/park/monument	Country in which the place/park/monument is located	Total approximate area that the place/park/monument covers (ha)
Cesar E. Chavez National Monument	United States (US)	42
Chimney Rock National Monument	United States (US)	1,913
Fort Ord National Monument	United States (US)	5,929
Fulufjellet National Park	Norway	82,500
Limmen National Park	Australia	1,000,000
Naats'ihch'oh National Park Reserve	Canada	485,000
Ntokou-Pikounda National Park	Republic of Congo	4,572
Olympic Park, London	United Kingdom (UK)	Unknown

== See also ==
- 2012 in the environment
