= Shifang =

Shifang 什邡市
- County-level city
- Nickname: The Pearl of Western Sichuan (川西明珠)
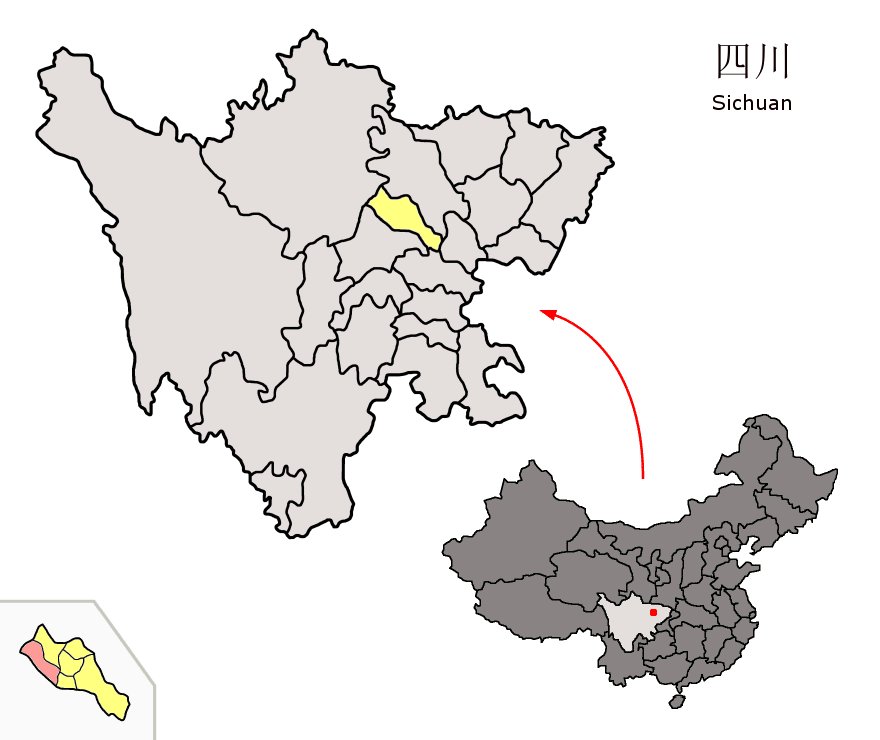
- Location of Shifang City (red) within Deyang City (yellow) and Sichuan

- Location of the city center in Sichuan
- Coordinates (Shifang government): 31°07′37″N 104°10′01″E
- Country: China
- Province: Sichuan
- Prefecture-level city: Deyang
- Municipal seat: Fangting Subdistrict (方亭街道)

Area
  - Total: 863 km^{2} (333 sq mi)

Population (2020 census)
  - Total: 406,775
  - Density: 471/km^{2} (1,220/sq mi)
- Time zone: UTC+8 (China Standard)
- Postal code: 618400
- Area code: 0838
- Website: http://www.shifang.gov.cn/

Shifang
- Chinese: 什邡
Transcriptions
Standard Mandarin
- Hanyu Pinyin: Shífāng

- Former names

Zhifang
- Chinese: 汁方 汁邡 (Later Han)
Transcriptions
Standard Mandarin
- Hanyu Pinyin: Zhīfāng

Meixin
- Chinese: 美信
Transcriptions
Standard Mandarin
- Hanyu Pinyin: Měixìn

Fangting
- Chinese: 方亭
Transcriptions
Standard Mandarin
- Hanyu Pinyin: Fāngtīng

Fangning
- Traditional Chinese: 方寧
- Simplified Chinese: 方宁
Transcriptions
Standard Mandarin
- Hanyu Pinyin: Fāngnīng

Tongji
- Traditional Chinese: 通計
- Simplified Chinese: 通计
Transcriptions
Standard Mandarin
- Hanyu Pinyin: Tōngjì

Shifang is a county-level city in Sichuan, China, under administration of Deyang prefecture-level city. It is located directly about 50 kilometers (31 mi) from Chengdu. It had an area of 863 km^{2} (333 sq mi) and a population of 406,775 in 2020. Shifang has a history stretching back over two thousand years. It suffered heavy damage during the 2008 Sichuan earthquake. The city was also the scene of a large-scale environmental protest against a copper smelting plant in July 2012.

== Names ==
The area was first known as Zhifang during the Chu-Han Contention that followed the collapse of China's Qin dynasty. Under Wang Mang's Xin dynasty, the area was renamed Meixin County in AD 4, but the Bright and Martial Emperor of the restored Han dynasty restored the name Zhifang—with a different character—in AD 25. The current name was first adopted in AD 221 by the Kingdom of Shu. Under the Northern Zhou, Shifang was known as Fangting or Fangning between 557 and its merger with Luo County sometime between 566 and 576. Between 912 and 919, it was known as Tongji County.

== History ==
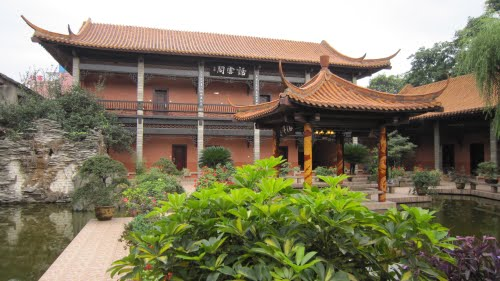
a Shifang temple

=== Ancient China ===
The area of present-day Shifang formed part of Western Qiang (西羌, Xīqiāng), one of the regions that appear in ancient Chinese records as the birthplace of the famed Yu the Great. The local tourism board has pressed the claim that he was specifically born in Shifang, but similar claims are made by Beichuan, Wenchuan, and Dujiangyan in Sichuan, as well as many other places in other parts of China.

=== Imperial China ===
Following the conquest of Shu by Qin, the Qin administrator Li Bing lived in Shifang during his work on the Dujiangyan irrigation system. Some historians make him a native of the area. Following the collapse of Qin, the tiny kingdom of Zhifang was formed in present-day Shifang in 201 BC. The area was reconquered by the Martial Emperor of the Han in 111 BC and formed part of the Kingdom of Shu during China's Three Kingdoms period. Under the Northern Zhou, it was merged with Luo County (雒縣) sometime between 566 and 576. It was reëstablished by the Tang in 619. The Chan Buddhist patriarch Mazu Daoyi was born in Shifang's town of Mazu in 709. It formed part of Former Shu between 912 and 919.

In late imperial times, Shifang County was organized as part of the prefecture of Chengdu. Following the Columbian Exchange, it—along with the rest of the plain around Chengdu—became a center of China's tobacco cultivation. In the 19th century, Shifang County was reckoned to have the third-best quality of tobacco, after nearby Pi and Jintang counties.

=== Modern China ===
The People's Republic of China made it a county-level city in 1995, placing it under the administration of Deyang.

Shifang was one of the most severely hit cities in the 2008 Sichuan earthquake, with a death toll of 5924. Many of those killed were children, with 13 school buildings totally collapsing in Hongbai, Yinghua, Luoshui, Jiandi, Bajiao, and other towns and dozens of other schools partially collapsing throughout the county. Altogether, 12 teachers and 550 students were killed.

In 2012, high school students organised a protest against the construction of a copper plant in the city that would have caused a significant amount of pollution. The protest was successful at blocking the construction of the factory.

== Economy ==
Prior to the 2008 earthquake, Shifang had a GDP of 12.7 billion RMB. It was reckoned one of the "100 Small and Medium-Sized Chinese Cities Most Rewarding to Investment" (全国最具投资潜力中小城市百强) and had been rated the second-best county for growth in Sichuan every year since 1995.It was considered one of the "100 Small and Medium-Sized Chinese Cities Most Rewarding to Investment" and had been ranked as the second-fastest growing county in Sichuan Province every year since 1995.

The local economy was primarily driven by manufacturing, agriculture, and chemical industries, with a strong focus on phosphorus-based products and related industrial development. Shifang also benefited from its strategic location within the Chengdu economic zone, which facilitated trade and investment. Infrastructure development and government policies aimed at attracting foreign investment further contributed to its rapid economic growth prior to the earthquake.

Its status as the "Pearl of Western Sichuan" had been built on its natural resources and productions. It was called "Phosphorite City" (磷矿城) from its rich veins of phosphate rock and associated chemical industry and the "Hometown of Chinese Mineral Water" (中国矿泉水之乡) from its natural springs. For over 400 years, the Chengdu plain has been a center of China's tobacco cultivation, with Shifang's produce reckoned among the best. At a time when most of China took tobacco in the form of snuff, the people of Sichuan were rolling it into a form of cigar. Shifang's were given as tribute to the Guangxu Emperor during the Qing and to Mao Zedong and other Communist leaders in the 1950s, earning the town the nickname of the "Hometown of the Chinese Cigar" (中国雪茄之乡).

In 2008, Beijing Municipality planned to coördinate with Shifang City during its construction of a 10 km^{2} (3.9 sq mi) capital industry park at Luoshui (北京市对口支援什邡市). The road which will link the Chengdu-Mianyang Expressway and Shifang City will be completed in 2008. In addition, a new Chengdu-Shifang-Mianyang Expressway and the Chengdu-Lanzhou High-speed Railway, which will pass through Shifang, are scheduled to complete around 2011, and will make it possible to travel from Chengdu to Shifang in 30 minutes. With the leadership of Chinese government and support of international community, the government of Shifang City plans to complete reconstruction until 2011, make GDP recover to same of 2007 until 2013, and make the city to be a modernized city until 2018.

The cigar industry is undergoing a revival with an investment of €85 million by China Tobacco Chuanyu Industrial Corporation, the owner of Great Wall-brand cigars, in partnership with the Dutch cigar maker Agio, in a cigar complex that is expected to be finished by 2013 and will be capable of churning out two billion cigars a year.

A $1.64 billion copper and molybdenum processing plant is planned by the HTC for the Shifang Economic Development Zone. The project has become controversial, due to environmental reasons. The project further provoked a demonstration of local residents demanding cancellation of the project on 2 July 2012. After violent clashes between the public and the police and nationwide campaigns on the Internet, the project was finally dropped.

== Tourism ==
=== Places of Interest ===
- Yinghua Mountain (蓥华山)
- Western Surprise Happy Valley (西部惊奇欢乐谷), unrelated to Happy Valley (amusement parks)
- Luohan Temple (罗汉寺)
- Li Bing Cenotaph (李冰陵)
- Shifang Longju Temple (什邡龙居寺)

=== Speciality foods ===
- Shifang Salted Duck (什邡板鸭)
- Hongbai Dried Tofu (红白豆腐干)
- Shifang Rice Noodles (什邡米粉)

== Administrative divisions ==
Shifang has two subdistricts and eight towns.

- Subdistricts
  - Fangting (方亭街道)
  - Yongcheng (雍城街道)
- Towns:
  - Luoshui (洛水镇)
  - Hefeng (禾丰镇)
  - Mazu (马祖镇)
  - Majing (马井镇)
  - Yinghua (蓥华镇)
  - Nanquan (南泉镇)
  - Jiandi (湔氐镇)
  - Shigu (师古镇)

Some towns like Shuangsheng (双盛镇) has been merged in 2019 according to the authority.

== Climate ==
Climate data for Shifang (1991–2020 normals, extremes 1981–present)
Month	Jan	Feb	Mar	Apr	May	Jun	Jul	Aug	Sep	Oct	Nov	Dec	Year
Record high °C (°F)	19.1 (66.4)	19.9 (67.8)	27.3 (81.1)	31.5 (88.7)	35.1 (95.2)	34.8 (94.6)	35.6 (96.1)	39.7 (103.5)	35.7 (96.3)	27.7 (81.9)	23.9 (75.0)	19.2 (66.6)	39.7 (103.5)
Mean daily maximum °C (°F)	9.2 (48.6)	12.1 (53.8)	16.8 (62.2)	22.6 (72.7)	26.6 (79.9)	28.5 (83.3)	30.2 (86.4)	30.1 (86.2)	25.8 (78.4)	20.8 (69.4)	16.0 (60.8)	10.6 (51.1)	20.8 (69.4)
Daily mean °C (°F)	5.5 (41.9)	8.1 (46.6)	12.2 (54.0)	17.3 (63.1)	21.5 (70.7)	24.1 (75.4)	25.8 (78.4)	25.3 (77.5)	21.8 (71.2)	17.2 (63.0)	12.4 (54.3)	7.0 (44.6)	16.5 (61.7)
Mean daily minimum °C (°F)	2.8 (37.0)	5.1 (41.2)	8.7 (47.7)	13.2 (55.8)	17.3 (63.1)	20.7 (69.3)	22.4 (72.3)	21.9 (71.4)	19.1 (66.4)	14.8 (58.6)	9.7 (49.5)	4.3 (39.7)	13.3 (56.0)
Record low °C (°F)	−4.3 (24.3)	−4.3 (24.3)	−2.6 (27.3)	3.1 (37.6)	5.9 (42.6)	14.2 (57.6)	16.3 (61.3)	15.8 (60.4)	12.6 (54.7)	2.9 (37.2)	−0.1 (31.8)	−4.8 (23.4)	−4.8 (23.4)
Average precipitation mm (inches)	8.2 (0.32)	9.8 (0.39)	21.8 (0.86)	45.6 (1.80)	70.5 (2.78)	101.3 (3.99)	217.6 (8.57)	210.0 (8.27)	121.2 (4.77)	43.0 (1.69)	13.8 (0.54)	5.1 (0.20)	867.9 (34.18)
Average precipitation days (≥ 0.1 mm)	6.9	7.4	11.1	12.7	14.2	14.7	14.9	15.2	16.2	15.0	7.5	5.2	141
Average snowy days	1.3	0.5	0	0	0	0	0	0	0	0	0	0.3	2.1
Average relative humidity (%)	81	79	77	75	72	79	83	83	83	83	82	82	80
Mean monthly sunshine hours	57.7	61.5	90.8	117.1	125.1	113.5	128.7	140.7	71.0	58.9	61.6	57.8	1,084.4
Percentage possible sunshine	18	19	24	30	29	27	30	35	19	17	20	18	24
Source: China Meteorological Administration all-time extreme temperature all-time January high
