= Allianoi =

Ancient Roman settlement in modern Turkey

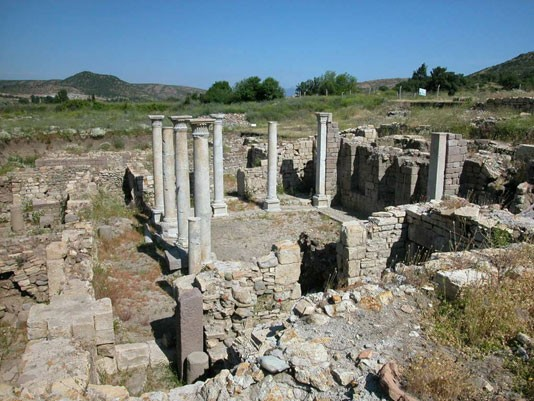
- The remains of Allianoi

- Location within Turkey
- 39°14′05″N 27°18′20″E
- Periods: Roman Imperial to Byzantine
- Cultures: Roman, Byzantine
- Location: İzmir Province, Turkey
- Region: Mysia

Site notes
- Condition: Submerged

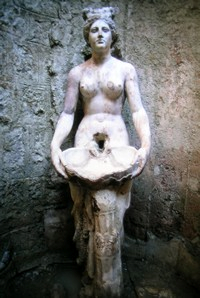
A nymph statue from Allianoi, which became a symbol for protestors against the submergence of Allianoi under the waters of the Yortanlı Dam.

Allianoi (Greek: Αλλιανοί) is an ancient spa settlement, with remains dating predominantly from the Roman Empire period (2nd century AD) located near the city of Bergama (ancient Pergamon) in Turkey's İzmir Province. The site is at a distance of 18 kilometers to the northeast of Bergama, on the road to the neighboring town of İvrindi. Allianoi is directly inside the reservoir of the Yortanlı Dam, built by the Turkish State Hydraulic Works. After ongoing discussion in Turkey with regard to preserving Allianoi's ruins, the site was covered with sand and the dam was activated, resulting in Allianoi's complete inundation and destruction in February 2011.

One particularity of Allianoi is it being a very recent historical discovery. It was mentioned only once in the 2nd century by the orator and medicinal writer Aelius Aristides in his "Hieroi Logoi" (Sacred Tales) (III.1), one of the key sources for the knowledge on the science of healing as it was understood at that time. No other writer of antiquity nor any epigraphic finding known had referred to Allianoi.

== Prehistoric times ==
During the excavations conducted in the forest to the west of Allianoi, a vessel of the type known as Yortan (dating from the Early Bronze Age II) was found. On the hills of Çakmaktepe (Flint Hill) nearby, a high quantity of flintstones were found during surveys. Additionally, two stone axes were unearthed from an earth fill. These findings suggest some form of prehistoric settlement at or near Allianoi.

== Hellenistic period ==
Because of the presence of hot springs, it is thought that there must have been a thermal bath complex already in the Hellenistic period, but probably at a smaller scale than the later Roman site. No architectural material was found in Allianoi belonging to this period apart from a few archaeological and numismatic clues.

== Roman period ==
During the Roman Imperial Period and especially as of the 2nd century AD, consistent with the emergence of a multitude of urban centers in Anatolia and also with the construction of the famous Asklepion of nearby Pergamon, the number of public works built in Allianoi also increased. Many of the edifices encountered at the site today date from this period. Besides the thermal baths, the bridges, the streets, the insulae, the Connection Building, propylon and the nympheum were all planned and built during this period.

== Byzantine period ==
Allianoi was still densely populated during the Byzantine period. Nevertheless, as was the case with neighboring Pergamon, the socio-economic fabric of the urban settlement had frayed. Some architectural elements of the Roman Period were re-used by the Byzantine settlers. Utilizing the paved streets of the stoas and streets of the Roman period, succeeding Byzantine populations constructed simpler dwellings. The most important buildings of Allianoi, namely the thermal baths and the nympheum, remained in use for a long time, with some minor alterations. A large church reminiscent of a basilica was built in the east, while chapels were constructed in and around the settlement. Metal, ceramic and glass workshops were all traceable to this period.

== Ottoman period ==
The site was known as Paşa Ilıcası (The Thermal Baths of the Pasha) in the Ottoman Period. While noted in the historical documentation of the vilayet (province) of Aydın, it does not seem to have been used on an extensive scale. The only traces of this period are a few shards of coins. In the beginning of the 20th century, the sub-governor of the region did start an effort to put the spa complex back to use and the big pool section has been partially refurbished. Also, all along the Ottoman period and up to 1979, the Roman Bridge situated to the west of the settlement was used to connect the towns of Bergama and İvrindi.

== Present day ==
The bath complex was partially cleaned of accumulated silt in the beginning of the 20th century. Despite continuous flooding, the hot springs section was in use in the 1950s. In 1992, the Roman Bridge that was also still in use was reconstructed with some distortions, disregarding the interests of conservationists. Also, in 1992, some rather shabby reconstruction work had been done in Allianoi itself, as a modern building was constructed over the historical remains. The complex was put out of use after heavy flooding in February 1998. Some of the site has been used as farmland. These recent elements were removed in 2003 by the excavation team and the major parts of the Bath Complex beneath them started to come to light.

=== Yortanlı Dam ===
The Turkish State Hydraulic Works devised a plan in 1994 to dam the Ilya River with Yortanlı Dam, creating a reservoir in order to increase agricultural productivity in the region. The Allianoi bath complex lies within the proposed reservoir area, meaning it would be covered in water should the dam project go through. Protests from ICOMOS, UNESCO, Europa Nostra, and the EU have done little but to delay the inevitability of the project. As of December 31, 2010, Yortanli Dam started filling water and Allianoi is already under 61 million meter cubic water.

== Publications ==
- YARAŞ A. (2004) "Allianoi", TÜRSAB Magazine, August 2004,
- MÜLLER, H., "Allianoi. Zur Identifizierung eines antiken Kurbades im Hinterland von Pergamon ", IstMitt 54, 2004; 215–225.
- YARAŞ 1999 A. Yaraş, "Bergama'da İkinci Antik Sağlık Merkezi : Allianoi", Yapı Aylık Kültür, Sanat ve Mimarlık Dergisi, 217 / Aralık, pp. 35–38.
- YARAŞ 1999 A. Yaraş "1998 Yortanlı Barajı Kurtarma Kazısı", Bergama Belleten 9, pp. 44–50.
- YARAŞ 2001 A. Yaraş, "Su İçinde Gelen Sağlık, Su İçinde Yok Olan Kültür!; Allianoi", Toplumsal Tarih, Sayı 85, Ocak, pp. 26–29.
- YARAŞ 2001 A. Yaraş, "Tanrıçanın Hüznü Allianoi", Atlas 97, Nisan, s.48-66.
- YARAŞ 2000 A. Yaraş, "Yortanlı (Bergama) Baraj Havzası'ndaki Tarihsel Miras", Zeugma Yalnız Değil Türkiye'de Barajlar ve Kültürel Miras, Aralık, s. 109-115.
- YARAŞ 2001 A. Yaraş, "1998-1999 Bergama Yortanlı Barajı Kurtarma Kazısı" 11. Müze Çalışmaları ve Kurtarma Kazıları Sempozyumu (24-26 Nisan 2000 Denizli), Ankara, pp. 105–118.
- YARAŞ 2001 A. Yaraş, "2000 Yılı Allianoi Kurtarma Kazısı", XXIII. Kazı Araştırma ve Arkeometri Sempozyum Sonuçları, Ankara, (25-30 Mayıs 2001 Ankara), I. Cilt, pp. 463–478.
- YARAŞ 2002 A. Yaraş, "Allianoi " Arkeoatlas sayı 1, pp. 148–149.
- YARAŞ 2002 A. Yaraş, "İzmir'de Yeni Bir Ören Yeri; Allianoi", İzmir Kent Kültürü Dergisi, Şubat, sayı 5, pp. 165–170.
- YARAŞ 2003 A.Yaraş "Allianoi Geç Antik Çağ Seramik Fırınları", 3. Uluslararası Eskişehir Pişmiş Toprak Sempozyumu, (16-30 Haziran 2003 Eskişehir), pp. 404–410.
- YARAŞ 2003 A. Yaraş, "2002 Yılı Allianoi Kurtarma Kazısı", XXIV. Kazı Araştırma ve Arkeometri Sempozyum Sonuçları, (27-30 Mayıs 2001 Ankara), pp. 373–384. Ankara.
- YARAŞ 2004 A.Yaraş, "Allianoi 2003 Kazıları", XXV Uluslararası Kazı Sonuçları Toplantısı, (26-31 Mayıs 2002 Ankara), Baskıda.
