= Restrepia mendozae =

Conservation status
- CITES Appendix II

Scientific classification
- Kingdom: Plantae
- Clade: Tracheophytes
- Clade: Angiosperms
- Clade: Monocots
- Order: Asparagales
- Family: Orchidaceae
- Subfamily: Epidendroideae
- Genus: Restrepia
- Species: R. mendozae

Binomial name
- Restrepia mendozae Luer

Species of flowering plant

Restrepia mendozae is a species of flowering plant in the family Orchidaceae. It is an epiphyte.

The species is native to Ecuador. It was described in 1996, and is listed in Appendix II of CITES.

== Taxonomy ==
The species was described by Carlyle A. Luer in 1996. The holotype was collected in 1992, in the Cordillera del Cóndor, at an elevation of 1,500 metres (4,900 ft).

== Distribution ==
Restrepia mendozae is native to the wet tropical biome of the Cordillera del Cóndor, in south-east Ecuador.

== Conservation ==
Restrepia mendozae is listed in Appendix II of CITES. There are no quotas or suspensions in place for the species.
