= Las Naves Canton =

- Canton
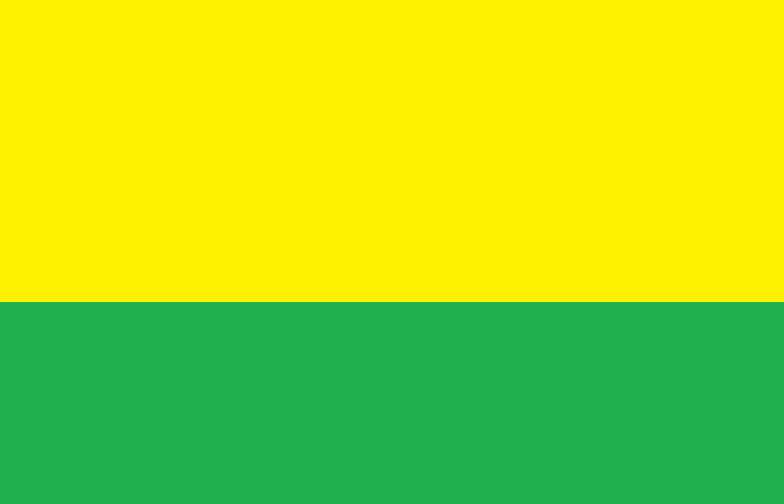
- Flag

- Location of Bolívar Province in Ecuador.

- Las Naves Canton in Bolívar Province
- Coordinates: 01°17′0″S 79°18′0″W
- Country: Ecuador
- Province: Bolívar Province
- Capital: Las Naves

Area
  - Total: 150.2 km^{2} (58.0 sq mi)

Population (2022 census)
  - Total: 7,012
  - Density: 46.68/km^{2} (120.9/sq mi)
- Time zone: UTC-5 (ECT)

Las Naves Canton is a canton of Ecuador, located in the Bolívar Province. Its capital is the town of Las Naves. Its population at the 2001 census was 5,265.

== Demographics ==
Ethnic groups as of the Ecuadorian census of 2010:

- Mestizo 82.4%
- Montubio 8.1%
- Afro-Ecuadorian 4.4%
- White 3.6%
- Indigenous 1.4%
- Other 0.1%
