= Shifang protest =

2012 environmental protest in Sichuan, China

- Location of Shifang (China)
- Date: 1 July 2012–3 July 2012
- Location: Shifang, Sichuan province People's Republic of China; 31°20′N 104°12′E
- Goals: Suspension of the Sichuan Hongda Co. copper smelting plant

Parties
Shifang local government; Sichuan Hongda Co. Ltd.	Students, residents of Shifang and surrounding areas

The Shifang protest was a large-scale environmental protest in the southwestern Chinese city of Shifang, Sichuan province, against a copper plant that residents feared posed environmental and public health risks. The protests spanned from July 1-3, 2012, and drew thousands of participants. Police were dispatched to break up the demonstrations, and reportedly shot tear gas and stun grenades into the crowd. Chinese authorities said some protesters stormed a government building and smashed vehicles. Images and video of the protest circulated on the microblogs and social networking websites throughout China, some showing the protesters — many of them students — badly beaten. The protests ended late on July 3rd when the local government announced that it had terminated construction of the metals plant, and released all but six protesters who had been taken into custody.

The protest was notable for its size and the composition of its participants, as well as for its success in derailing the copper plant project. It was one of a growing number of large-scale environmental protests in China that achieved success.

== Background ==
The Shifang city area was among the most severely impacted by the 2008 Sichuan earthquake, suffering heavy loss of life and major damage to infrastructure. The centerpiece of the city's economic revitalization efforts was to be the Sichuan Hongda Co.'s copper smelting plant. The plant was to be one of the largest in the world, and its construction was intended to spur economic growth through the creation of thousands of jobs. China's Ministry of Environmental Protection said the $1.7 billion plant would refine 40,000 tons of molybdenum and 400,000 tons of copper annually.

Copper smelting and refining processes can produce a variety of toxic byproducts, including mercury, sulphur dioxide, and arsenic. Residents feared these pollutants would seep into the city's air and water supply. Critics further charged that the government had not been transparent in reviewing or disclosing information on the plant's potential environmental impact. Ma Jun, director of the Institute of Public and Environmental Affairs, told The Guardian that the government "only released the short version of the plant's environmental report, which did not have information about the solid waste and waste water." Ma added: "Heavy metal projects are always highly polluting. Of course the public has concerns about this." Residents of the city had reportedly filed petitions against the project, but authorities took no action. Reuters reported that although many local residents supported the efforts to create jobs, they were upset by the government's lack of consultation with the public and failure to adequately address environmental concerns.

== Protests ==
Construction on the Sichuan Hongda copper refinery began on 29 June with the company laying the foundation for the plant. Two days later, on 1 July, hundreds of student protesters assembled in front of municipal government buildings to protest the project. Protests grew on 2 and 3 July as thousands more citizens—including students from nearby Guanghan city—demonstrated on the streets and in front of government offices demanding the suspension of the project. Protesters carried banners with slogans such as "Unite to protect the environment for the next generation" and "Safeguard our hometown, oppose the chemical factory's construction." The South China Morning Post reported that the protest swelled to have tens of thousands of participants.

Authorities and state-run media reported that the protests turned violent, with demonstrators overturning police vehicles and throwing bricks at government buildings. Police were dispatched to quell the protests, firing tear gas and stun grenades into the crowd, and detaining 27 protesters. Images and video circulated online showing protesters bloodied and beaten, and police carrying batons and lobbing tear gas into the crowds. Witnesses told the South China Morning Post that about 8,000 police were stationed along major roads, and that the security officers had used force to disperse the protests.

The local government announced on the morning of 3 July that the copper plant construction would be suspended. Protests continued into the evening, with demonstrators demanding the release of the detained protesters, most of whom were students. Late in the evening of 3 July, authorities released 21 of the 27 detained protesters. Protests subsided, though six remained in custody facing criminal and administrative charges for their role in the demonstrations.

Public demonstrations were briefly revived on 9 July amidst unverified rumors that a 14-year-old girl had been beaten to death during the protests. However, authorities consistently refuted reports of casualties or mass bloodshed, saying that only a few residents and police officers were injured. Local authorities also said that police had "exercised great restraint" in their handling of the protest.

=== Aftermath ===
Two months after the protests in Shifang, residents told the New York Times that there were no signs that the Sichuan Hongda project was being resuscitated, and that the city had been quiet since the demonstrations concluded. An executive with Sichuan Hongda told Caijing magazine on July 9 that it was unclear whether the construction for copper plant would go forward in the future, and whether it would be located in Sichuan province.

After the demonstrations, authorities were left to grapple with providing housing and compensation to approximately 2,300 villagers whose land had been requisitioned to make room for the copper plant. Villagers from Hongmiao and Jinguang, Shifang, reportedly received eviction notices in November 2011 and saw their homes demolished the following month. As of July 2012, they had yet to receive promised compensation from the government.

During a Communist Party committee meeting on 25 October 2012, authorities in Shifang decided to replace the local party secretary, Li Chengjin. His position was assumed by former mayor Li Zhuo.

== Significance ==
=== Role of students ===
The Shifang protests were notable in part due to the composition of the demonstration, which was largely led and organized by young students. Although China experiences tens of thousands of large-scale protests annually, student involvement in anti-government protests has been rare since the 1989 Tiananmen Square Protests. Leslie Hook of the Financial Times wrote that the protests "revealed a potentially important shift in the country's politics: youth were at the forefront of the three-day demonstration, exposing a new vein of activism in a generation seen by many as apathetic." Environmental causes and land rights issues seemed particularly attractive to the "post 90s" generation, she wrote. Stanley Lubman wrote for the Wall Street Journal that "the protests may augur both a growing public anger over environmental degradation and a rise of political activism among China's younger generation – trends that could lead in turn to an increase in legal challenges to the arbitrary behavior of local governments." Chinese blogger Michael Anti explained the shift by saying that the generation born after 1990 is "the generation of social media so they embrace freedom of speech as their birthright."

Alarmed by the participation of students in the demonstration, the Chinese Communist Party tabloid Global Times newspaper ran an editorial exhorting young people to stay out of mass protests and political conflicts, and chastised adults who encouraged such behavior. The editorial was met with some derision on Chinese social media websites; one netizen responded by drawing attention to images of young school children being organized to participate in political rallies supporting the ruling Communist Party.

=== Importance of social media ===
As the Shifang protest unfolded, government-run media outlets were largely silent in covering developments in the city. On 3 July, for instance, the official media outlets People's Daily and Xinhua News Agency carried minimal reports on either the protests or the local government's promise to halt construction of the copper smelting plant. Social media platforms and text messaging thus became the primary means by which information on the protests were shared. According to the University of Hong Kong's China Media Project, between 1 and 4 July, "there were around 5.25 million posts on Sina Weibo containing 'Shifang'. Of these about 400,000 included images and close to 10,000 included video."

The protests gave rise a popular internet meme based on a photograph of a shield and baton-wielding police officer, identified as Liu Bo, chasing a group of young protesters. Liu's image was photoshopped into other scenes, depicting him chasing after actor Mark Wahlberg and Olympic hurdler Liu Xiang, or appearing in the background of Edvard Munch's The Scream. The Atlantic's Jessica Levine wrote that the image was "representative of a growing resentment toward alleged abuses by the People's Armed Police," noting that such memes can serve as a barometer of culture in an environment where freedom of speech is limited. "Because of the strictures on speech in China, memes tend to be a really effective way to spread a political message," said social media expert and blogger An Xiao Mina. "If you use off-the-cuff, remixed humor, it's a little easier to talk about such critical topics."

== See also ==
- Environmental issues in China
- Qidong protest
