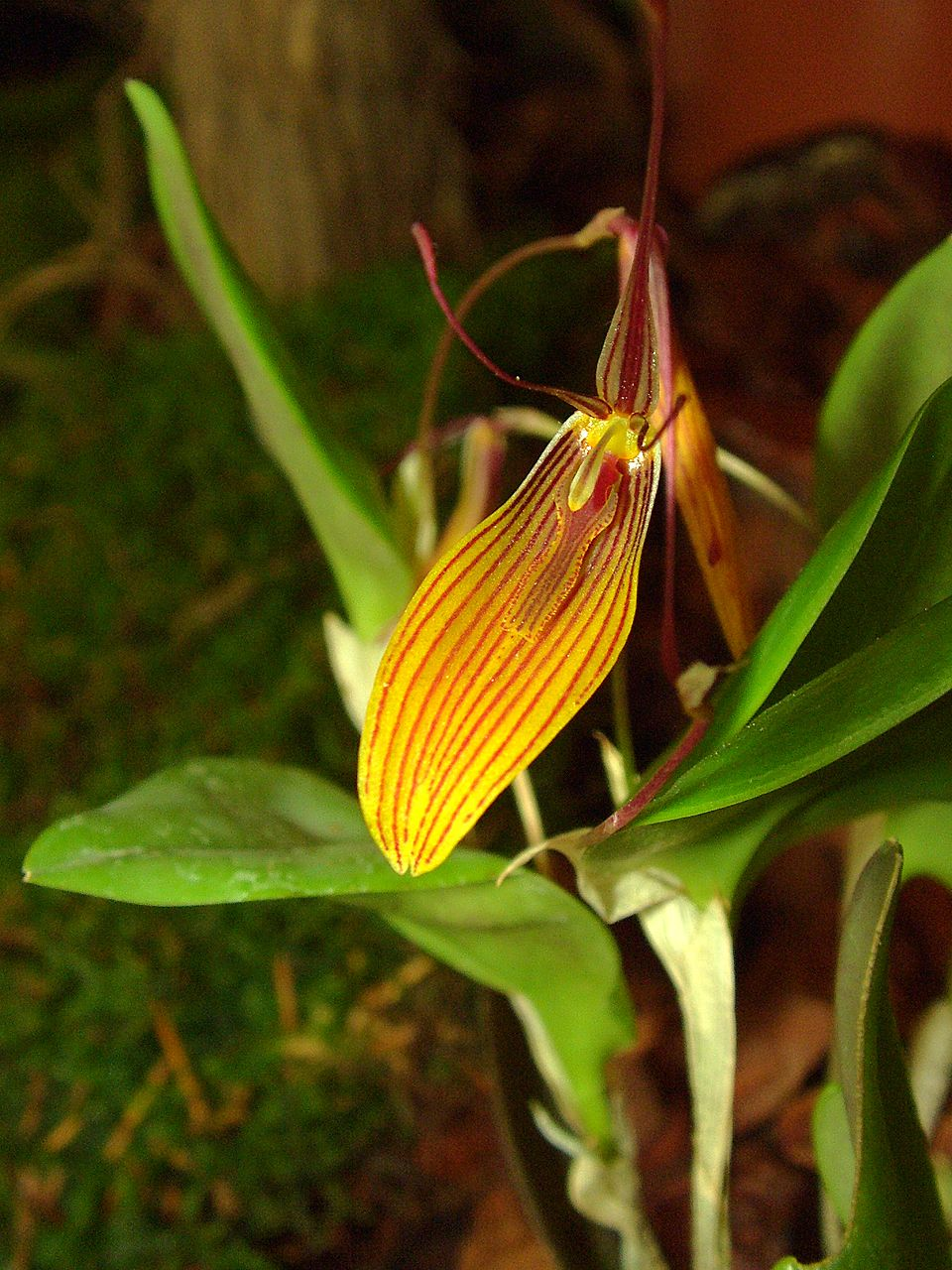
- Flower of Restrepia brachypus

Scientific classification
- Kingdom: Plantae
- Clade: Tracheophytes
- Clade: Angiosperms
- Clade: Monocots
- Order: Asparagales
- Family: Orchidaceae
- Subfamily: Epidendroideae
- Genus: Restrepia
- Species: R. brachypus

Binomial name
- Restrepia brachypus Rchb.f.

Synonyms
- Restrepia striata Rolfe; Renanthera striata Rolfe; Pleurothallis hawkesii Flickinger; Restrepia antennifera ssp. striata (Rolfe) H.Mohr

= Restrepia brachypus =

Species of orchid

Restrepia brachypus, the short-column foot restrepia, is a species of orchid occurring from western South America to Venezuela.
