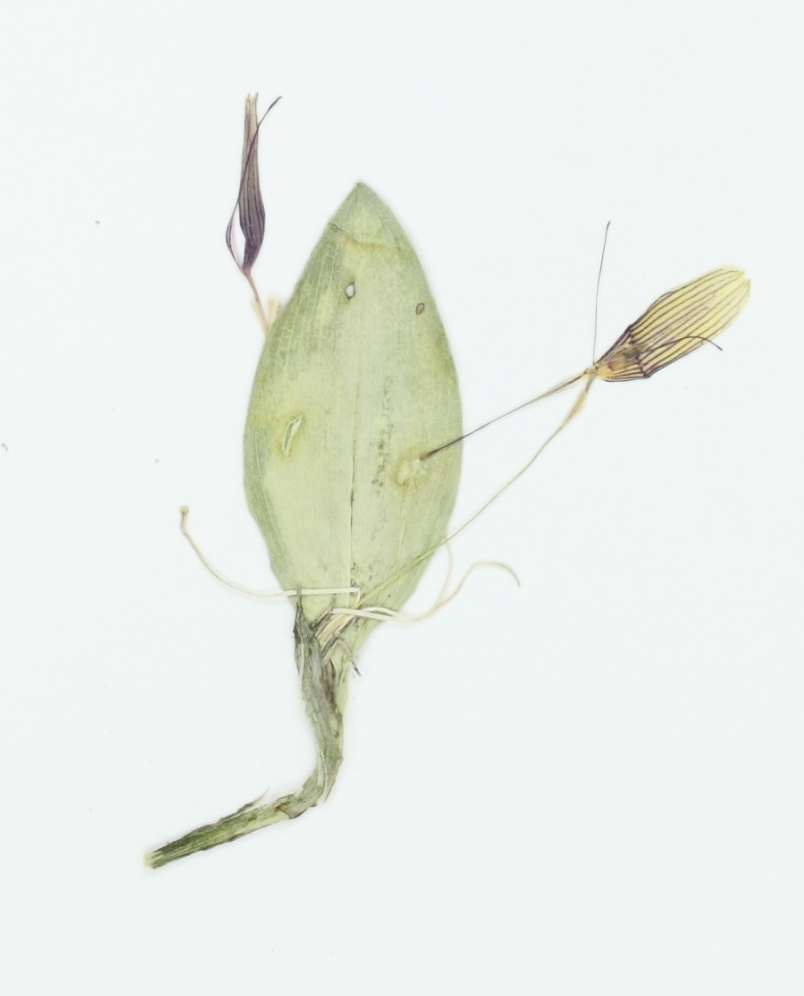

Conservation status
- CITES Appendix II

Scientific classification
- Kingdom: Plantae
- Clade: Tracheophytes
- Clade: Angiosperms
- Clade: Monocots
- Order: Asparagales
- Family: Orchidaceae
- Subfamily: Epidendroideae
- Genus: Restrepia
- Species: R. chrysoglossa

Binomial name
- Restrepia chrysoglossa Luer & R.Escobar

= Restrepia chrysoglossa =

Species of flowering plant

Restrepia chrysoglossa is a species of flowering plant in the orchid family.

The species is native to the wet tropical biome of Valle Del Cauca, Colombia. It is an epiphyte.

== Taxonomy ==
Restrepia chrysoglossa was named by Carlyle A. Luer & Rodrigo Escobar in 1996. The type specimen was collected in 1990, in Valle del Cauca, Colombia, at an elevation of 2,100 metres (6,900 ft). The specimen flowered in cultivation.

== Conservation ==
Restrepia chrysoglossa is listed in Appendix II of CITES. There are no quotas or suspensions in place for the species.
