= Mrima Hill mine =

Nionium mine in Kwale County , Coast Province, Kenya

- Interactive map of Mrima Hill mine
- Location: Kwale County, Coast Province, Kenya
- Products: Niobium

The Mrima Hill mine is a large niobium mine located in southern Kenya in the Coast Province, close to Mombasa. Mrima Hill represents one of the largest niobium reserves in Kenya, having estimated reserves of 105.3 million tonnes of ore grading 0.65% niobium metal. This amounts to nearly more than half of the world's niobium deposits .
