= Bedford Biofuels =

Bedford Biofuels was a green energy company headquartered in Edmonton, Alberta. The company intended to produce biodiesel from Jatropha curcas grown on plantations in eastern Kenya, where it planted its first crop in October 2011 after receiving a positive environmental impact assessment from Kenya's National Environment Management Authority (NEMA).

== Obstacles to progress, cease trade and bankruptcy ==
Initially leasing land in 2009, in 2011, the company planted 19 of 60,000 hectares leased in Kenya. Citing difficulties working with Kenyan authorities and locals in the Tana River District where the project was based, by 2012 the project was severely delayed and the CEO, David McClure, was considering aborting the project. At the same time, the Alberta Securities Commission issued a cease-trade order, prohibiting the company from raising capital in their Canadian home province. McClure indicated that the company's focus was on raising capital in Asia, but certain Albertan investors had begun court proceedings against the company. By 2013, the company had declared bankruptcy. As of July 2017, the Alberta Securities Commission had still not determined if complaints lodged against McClure had merit.
