= Las Naves =

- Location within Ecuador
- Coordinates: 01°17′0″S 79°18′0″W
- Country: Ecuador
- Province: Bolívar Province
- Canton: Las Naves Canton

Government
  - Mayor: Froilan Aldaz Nuñez

Area
  - Total: 0.8 km^{2} (0.31 sq mi)

Population (2022 census)
  - Total: 1,984
  - Density: 2,500/km^{2} (6,400/sq mi)
- Time zone: ECT
- Climate: Aw
- Website: www.lasnaves.com

Las Naves is a settlement in Bolívar Province, Ecuador. It is the seat of the Las Naves Canton.
