= Pungarayacu oil field =

Oil Field in Napo Province, Ecuador

Pungarayacu Oil Field
- Country: Ecuador
- Region: Napo Province
- Offshore/onshore: onshore
- Operator: Ivanhoe Energy

Field history
- Discovery: 1970
- Start of production: 2015

Production
- Current production of oil: 130,000 barrels per day (~6.5×10^{6} t/a)
- Estimated oil in place: 859 million tonnes (~ 1.0×10^{9} m^{3} or 6400 million bbl)

The Pungarayacu Oil Field is an oil field located in Napo Province. The oil field is also owned and operated by Ivanhoe Energy.

== History ==
It was discovered in 1970 and developed by Ivanhoe Energy.

The contract between the Ecuadorian government and Ivanhoe Energy to explore the Block 20 was signed in October 2008 and was planned to run for 30 years. The first barrels produced out of the Pungarayacu field were pumped in October 2010. By 2011, the heavy crude oil was elevated to pipeline quality.

In 2014, the 30-year contract between Ecuador's government and Ivanhoe Energy was cancelled. The development of a wider consortium was announced, China National Petroleum Corporation was considered to take the lead on the project, and Ivanhoe Energy was supposed to be part of the consortium. By 2015, due to lower oil prices, Ivanhoe Energy scaled back on the development of Block 20.

== Description ==
The total proven reserves of the Pungarayacu oil field are between 4.3 billion barrels (577 million tonnes) and 12.1 billion barrels (1.62 billion tonnes) with a mean estimate of 6.4 billion barrels (859 million tonnes), and production will be centered on 130,000 barrels per day (21,000 m^{3}/d).

Pungarayacu means "tar water"in the Kichwa language.

== Controversy ==
The field is located on the lands of the Rucullacta Kichwa population and the area is part of a UN Biosphere Reserve. The natives were barely consulted before initiating the exploration of the oil fields. A "Front of Resistance to the Irrational Exploitation of Natural Resources" was formed in 2004 by the natives to block the exploitation of the oil field. Low intensity conflicts erupted.
