= Yortanlı Dam =

- Location within Turkey
- Location: Turkey
- Coordinates: 39°13′40″N 27°19′28″E

Yortanlı Dam is a dam in İzmir Province, Turkey. The development was backed by the Turkish State Hydraulic Works. In 2010, it was announced that the dam will flood an ancient city of Allianoi.

== See also ==
- Allianoi
- List of dams and reservoirs in Turkey
