= Mirador mine =

Copper mine in Zamora-Chinchipe, Ecuador

- Location within Ecuador
- Location: Zamora-Chinchipe Province, Ecuador; 3°34′41″S 78°26′8″W
- Products: Copper
- Production: 137 Million lbs of copper; 34,000 oz gold; and 394,000 oz silver per year.
- Opened: 2019
- Company: Ecuacorriente S.A. (subsidiary of CRCC-Tongguan Investment Co. Ltd)

Local impacts
- Pollution: Acid mine drainage
- Displaced: over 30 Shuar families
- Jobs: 1,200 construction; 415 operation
- Development: road and water systems

Conflict
- Contested by: CONAIE and other Indigenous organisations
- Resulted in: 2012 Ecuadorian protests
- Contributed to: 2022 Ecuadorian protests
- Lawsuit(s): Rights of nature lawsuits filed in Ecuador

The Mirador mine is a large copper mine located in the Amazonian province of Zamora-Chinchipe in southern Ecuador. It is one of the largest copper reserves in Ecuador, and the first industrial-scale copper project to be developed in the country. The project has generated an environmental conflict that is emblematic in the national political debate on mining.

The project is owned and operated by Ecuacorriente S.A. (ECSA), a subsidiary of the state-owned Chinese company CRCC-Tongguan Investment Co. Ltd, which comprises Tongling Nonferrous Metals Group Holdings Co. Ltd. and China Railway Construction Corp. Ltd.

Development of the Mirador mine was opposed by the Confederation of Indigenous Nationalities of Ecuador (CONAIE), leading to the 2012 Ecuadorian protests. The first shipment of copper from the mine was exported to China in January 2020. Production at the mine was halted in June 2022 when access roads were blocked during widespread Indigenous-led protests that made several demands of the Ecuadorian government including a moratorium on oil and mining projects.

== Background ==
China is the world's largest consumer of copper, and the country has increasingly prioritised investment in non-ferrous metals as part of its foreign policy, especially in Latin America where there are many untapped reserves. Mirador mine lies in the Corriente Copper Belt, where Ecuacorriente S.A. controls mining interests on 62,000 hectares (150,000 acres). Ecuador has been reliant on oil exports for international financing, and has sought foreign investment to develop copper reserves in the Amazon as a source of funding for national infrastructure projects. Government estimates indicate that expansion of Ecuador's mining industry could generate at least $40 billion in export revenue between 2020 and 2030. China has invested approximately $1.4 billion into the Mirador project as of 2019, including $85 million in royalties to the Ecuadorian government. By 2020, Canadian and Chinese corporations had invested $7 billion in five major projects in the Corriente Copper Belt.

The Corriente Copper Belt has been the territory of the Indigenous Shuar people for one-thousand years. Mining in the region has been opposed by some Shuar communities and by national Indigenous organizations such as CONAIE, resulting in environmental conflict. Involvement of Shuar communities shapes how conflict in the region is perceived and the valuation language of conflicting parties: values such as economic benefits and development may be incommensurable with sacredness of the land and Indigenous rights. Resistance to the mine has been related to the Shuar indigenous cosmology as an expression of environmentalism of the poor: resistance to the project has been affected by Shuar laws restricting individual land ownership in favour of community land titles; lawsuits have been brought citing rights of nature and requirements for free, prior and informed consent. Although the conflict concerns tangible territorial transformations, it is also a struggle over meaning and the human-nature relationship, including the idea of Sumak Kawsay which is part of the Constitution of Ecuador.

Regional conflicts have also erupted over development of other projects in the area: development of the San Carlos Panantza copper mine was stalled by conflict in 2018, and there was continued resistance in 2020, when a mining camp was burned and ransacked.

Some local residents were forcibly evicted from their homes in or near the project area. These evictions are part of a pattern of forced evictions of Indigenous people in Ecuador and around the world for resource extraction. The Internal Displacement Monitoring Centre estimates that the number of people displaced for development projects may exceed the 25 million displaced by armed conflicts in 2008.

The project area includes protected areas in the Cordillera del Cóndor and hosts exceptional biodiversity that has been studied by Conservation International and the Missouri Botanical Garden, who stress that their assessments of biodiversity are incomplete. Mining in the area has been a source of debate for this reason.

== Development ==
Contracts for development of Mirador mine were signed with the Ecuadorian government in 2012.

Environmental impact assessments and feasibility studies for the mine were completed by Canadian company Corriente Resources, Inc in 2006 and 2008 respectively. The mine was purchased by the Chinese companies Tongling Nonferrous Metals Group (TNMG) and China Railway Construction Corporation Limited (CRCC) in 2010.

Chinese companies began construction of Mirador mine in 2012, investing approximately $1.4 billion into the project and producing the first copper in 2019. The first copper from the mine was exported to China in January 2020.

=== Details ===
Mirador mine covers approximately 2,995 hectares (7,400 acres) in the Cordillera del Condor mountain range in southern Ecuador. Its proven and probable reserves are estimated at 3.2 million tonnes (Mt) of copper, between 3.4 and 4.09 million ounces (Moz) of gold, and between 27.1 and 32.3 Moz of silver. Ore from the open-pit mine is trucked to a nearby processing plant where it is crushed and refined; then it is shipped to China for further processing.

Several feasibility studies were completed for the mine with different mill rates and mine life. A 2005 study proposed a plan based on 111 million tonnes of in-pit resources grading 0.67% Cu and 0.22 grams per tonne of gold, and a 12-year mine life. Another study in 2006 increased the pit size to 347 million tonnes with a 22 to 39 year mine life, and resources grading 0.62% Cu, 0.196 g/t gold, and 1.57 g/t silver. A 2008 report with a 30,000 TPD milling rate predicted annual production of 11 MT of concentrate, containing 137 million lbs of copper, 34,000 oz gold, and 394,000 oz silver for the first 10 years of the mine life and a total productive mine life of 17 years.

The 2008 feasibility study estimated the initial capital cost of the project at $418 million and a life of mine operating cost of $474 million. Total operating costs were estimated at $1.2 billion. Net smelter return was estimated at $3.2 billion, with significant potential for expansion, both at the Mirador deposit and a nearby deposit a few kilometres to the northeast outside the scope of the study.

== Environmental conflict ==
The mining company and the government have emphasised the possibility of responsibly mining the Mirador project. The mining company stated that positive impacts from the mine could include improvements to the local road network and water systems and that the project would generate up to 1,200 jobs during construction, 415 jobs during operation, and additional 'indirect jobs'. A 2016 study found that some local residents expressed faith in responsible mining and had hopes for jobs and economic development. The study found that perceptions of the mining project were not homogenous among Shuar communities: some Shuar representatives and organisations supported the mine while others were opposed. Locals who expressed scepticism about responsible mining had concerns about medium and long term environmental degradation. They also cited concerns about increased crime and violence caused by an influx of mine workers and capital. An inter-ethnic coalition representing Shuar communities, local farmers, and ranchers opposed the mine as a threat to their traditional lifestyles.

Opposition to the mine generated widespread protests led by CONAIE in 2012 demanding protection of water and increased consultation about extractive projects with Indigenous people. Production at the mine was halted in June 2022 when access roads were blocked during widespread Indigenous-led protests that made several demands of the Ecuadorian government including a moratorium on oil and mining projects.

=== Displacement ===
The mining company began pressuring locals in the town of San Marcos to sell their land in 2006 after completion of the EIA. Some families who refused to sell were forcibly removed; ECSA's private security and local police destroyed the school and church in San Marcos in 2014, and sixteen families were removed in a forced eviction in the middle of the night on September 30, 2015. Since development of the mine, human rights groups have denounced the project for forcibly evicting more than 30 Shuar families from their homes. A study of documents related to the displacement of local people concluded that ECSA did not follow its own program approved by the government for buying land in the project area, and incurred no fine or penalty for this fault. The study also found that ECSA was not transparent about prices paid for land purchased in the area: some residents accepted offers from the company below market value without receiving any information or support from the government; and people who rejected these offers were forcibly evicted or criminalised.

Many families were removed through the government's use of a legal mechanism called servidumbre (similar to eminent domain), which allows land seizure for projects in the “national interest”. Under servidumbre, the displaced people receive some financial compensation, but have no choice to remain on their land. Many Indigenous and mestizo families were vulnerable because they did not have official title to their land. Indigenous laws in which title is held in community (rather than individually) made it difficult for some people to participate in company buy-outs.

The Carnegie Endowment for International Peace reports that mining companies employed divide and conquer tactics to crush local resistance to the mine by enlisting local elites in side deals with "perverse social and political effects".

=== Water ===
Independent evaluation of the EIA concluded that mine waste posed serious threats to water quality through acid mine drainage, and that the EIA contained, "no plans to mitigate the risk of acid formation and potential rupture of the tailings impoundment dam". ECSA found that the tailings dam posed a "very high risk", and analysts are concerned that a tailings dam failure could result in a disaster similar to the Samarco dam disaster.

Residents also say that the mine has contaminated their water supply, and that people bathing in the local river, "emerge with rashes and lesions on their skin."

=== Archaeological sites ===
A study commissioned by INREDH (Fundación Regional de Asesoría en Derechos Humanos) and CASCOMI (Comunidad Amazónica de Acción Social Cordillera del Cóndor Mirador) concluded that numerous Indigenous archaeological sites were destroyed by the mine, that protocols of consultancy were ignored, and that archaeological rescue operations were carried out without informing either local Indigenous communities or official Indigenous agencies.

=== Lawsuits ===
Development of Mirador was challenged by at least six lawsuits between 2012 and 2019 brought by local officials, Indigenous community groups, individuals, environmental groups and scientists. Some of these lawsuits challenged the project on the basis of infringements of the rights of nature, which are protected by the constitution of Ecuador. Other lawsuits were brought on the basis of the murder of Indigenous leaders; infringement of community housing rights; Indigenous right to free, prior, and informed consent protected by Ecuador's constitution; and environmental regulations.

== See also ==
- Mining in Ecuador
- Environmental justice
