= Rovina mine =

Mine in Romania

Rovina
- Location in Romania
- Location: Bucureşci, Hunedoara County, Romania; 46°05′N 22°51′E
- Production: 106,000oz gold, 9Kt copper
- Financial year: 2009
- Company: Euro Sun Mining Inc.
- Website: ESM website
- Acquired: 2005

Rovina mine is a proposed open pit mine in the west of Romania in Hunedoara County, 18 km north of Deva and 388 km north of the capital, Bucharest. Rovina is a large gold and copper deposit with estimated reserves of 4 million oz of gold and 244,000 tonnes of copper, and the largest proposed copper-gold project in the EU. The project is wholly owned by the Toronto-based company Euro Sun Mining, (formerly named Carpathian Gold).

The project would process 14.4 million tonnes of ore per annum over an open pit life of 17 years, yielding approximately 106,000 oz of gold and 9Kt of copper per year.

In 2021, environmental groups announced that they had acquired land in the development area in an attempt to halt construction.

In 2025 Euro Sun Mining's Rovina Valley Project along 46 other projects was designated a strategic project by the European Union which allows for fast track permitting, with the Romanian government aligning legislation with the project.

The Rovina Valley Project, developed by Euro Sun Mining, continues to represent one of the most significant proposed mining investments in Romania in recent years. In September 2026, Euro Sun Mining announced a non-binding memorandum of understanding with Macquarie Bank and Trafigura Group to arrange up to US$400 million in senior debt financing for the project, together with a US$3 million strategic equity investment from Trafigura's Urion Investments Holdings; this followed an earlier agreement with Trafigura in December 2025 for up to US$200 million in project financing (https://www.globenewswire.com/news-release/2026/09/03/3356329/0/en/euro-sun-mining-announces-non-binding-mou-for-us-400-million-senior-debt-facility-and-term-sheet-for-us-3-million-strategic-equity-investment.html)

In recognition of its strategic importance to Europe's critical raw materials supply, the project was awarded Strategic Status by the European Union, underscoring its potential contribution to regional economic development and resource security. Distinct from many traditional mining operations, the project has been designed with a strong emphasis on modern environmental practices, including the use of cyanide-free processing methods and dry-stacked tailings to enhance safety and reduce environmental impact. In addition, a "3-for-1" tree policy has been incorporated, whereby three trees are planted for every tree removed, reflecting a commitment to ecological stewardship. Once final permitting is secured, the project is expected to create over 1,500 local jobs, offering a substantial economic boost to the Hunedoara region, an area that has experienced long-term industrial decline and underinvestment.

== Opposition ==
Opposition to the Rovina Valley Project have drawn on networks originally formed to resist development of the Roșia Montană Project, which led to the widespread protests in 2013 and ultimately halted that project. Critics have at times sought to portray the Rovina project as analogous to Roșia Montană, despite key differences in project design and environmental approach. However, there have been no notable protests against existing mining activity in the Rovina area. In 2023 July, Euro Sun Mining CEO claimed project has received broad support from local officials.
