= Fruta del Norte mine =

Gold mine in Zamora-Chinchipe Province, Ecuador

Fruta del Norte (FDN) deposit NOT A MINE (2015)
- Location within Ecuador
- Location: Zamora-Chinchipe Province, Ecuador; 3.83438931°S 78.60400078°W
- Products: Gold
- Company: Lundin Gold Inc.

The Fruta del Norte deposit is the largest gold deposit in Ecuador. The deposit is part of the Corriente Copper Belt located in the Amazon province of Zamora-Chinchipe.

In 2006 Aurelian Resources discovered a large deposit at Fruta del Norte, estimated between 6.8 and 10 million ounces of gold and between 9.1 and 14 million ounces of silver. Following changes to Ecuadorian mining laws that limited foreign ownership of mining projects, the Canadian company Kinross Gold acquired Aurelian Resources in 2009 and took on the project. Despite the project's potential, and just days before Congress passed a new mining law in 2013, Kinross pulled out of Ecuador after a dispute over windfall taxes, reporting a loss of $720 million. In 2014 Kinross sold its entire interest in the project to Fortress Minerals Corporation. The company was renamed Lundin Gold and the Fruta del Norte deposit went into production in 2019.

== Discovery ==
The deposit was discovered by a combination of a conceptual exploration model that predicted mineralization might occur buried in a pull-apart basin (Aurelian Exploration Manager Steve Leary) and the observation that some silicification of these basin sediments had occurred at Fruta del Norte by geologist Julio Soto.
