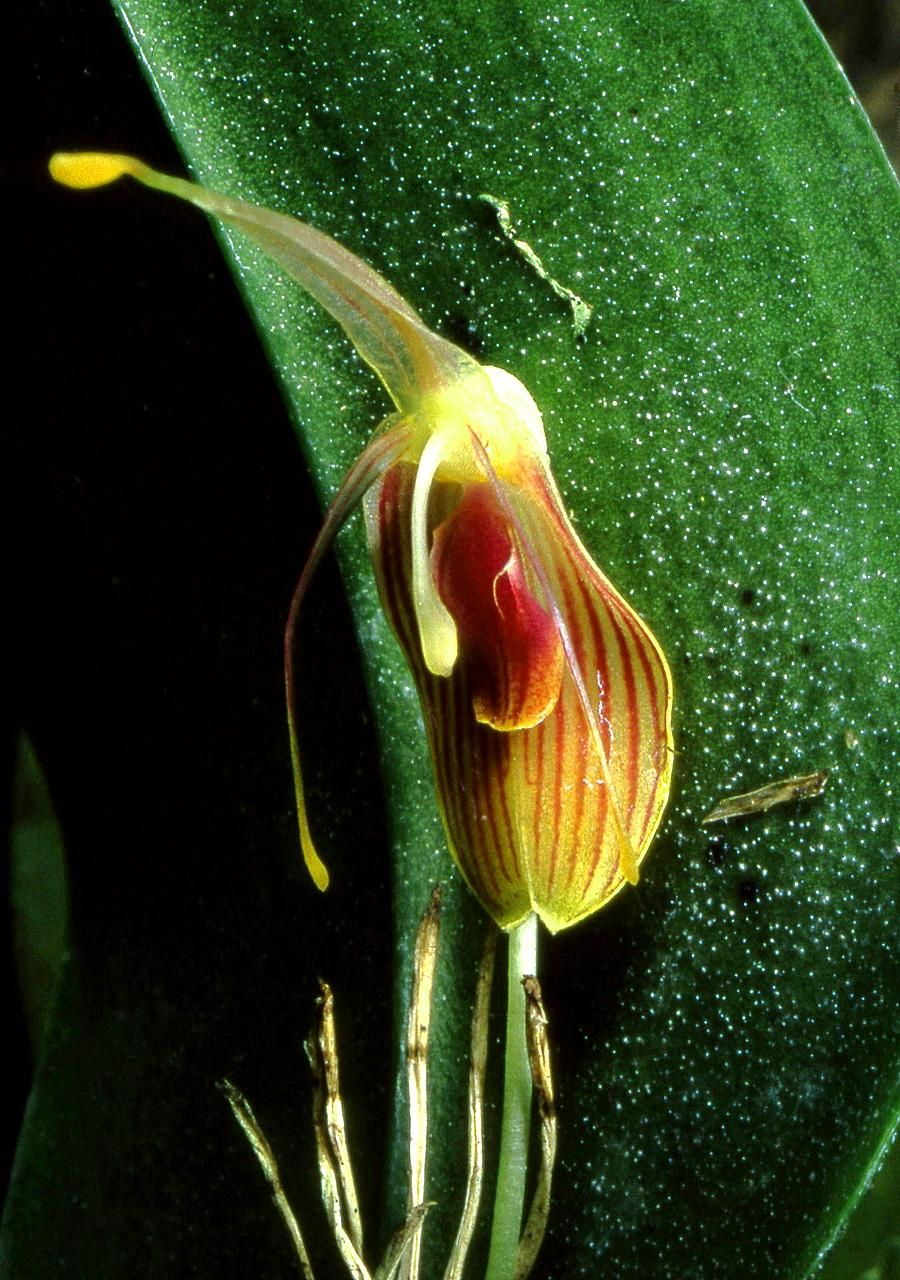
- Flower of Restrepia flosculata

Scientific classification
- Kingdom: Plantae
- Clade: Tracheophytes
- Clade: Angiosperms
- Clade: Monocots
- Order: Asparagales
- Family: Orchidaceae
- Subfamily: Epidendroideae
- Genus: Restrepia
- Species: R. flosculata

Binomial name
- Restrepia flosculata Luer

Synonyms
- Restrepia flosculata var. pallens H.Mohr & Herzum; Restrepia flosculata var. picta H.Mohr & Herzum; Restrepia flosculata ssp. picta (H.Mohr & Herzum) H.Mohr

= Restrepia flosculata =

Species of orchid

Restrepia flosculata, commonly called as the small-flowered restrepia, is a species of orchid occurring from Colombia to northwestern Ecuador.
