= Qidong protest =

2012 environmental protest in Qidong, China

- Date: 28 July 2012
- Location: Qidong, Jiangsu province People's Republic of China
- Goals: Suspension of a wastewater pipeline

Parties
Oji Paper Co.	Residents of Qidong

The Qidong protest was an environmental protest against a proposed waste water pipeline in the Chinese city of Qidong province. The protest took place on 28 July 2012. The pipeline, which would have dumped industrial waste water into the sea, was to be part of a paper factory owned jointly by Japan's Oji Paper Company. Thousands of citizens took to the streets demanding the cancellation of the project, citing environmental concerns. An estimated 1,000 protesters stormed government offices, overturning vehicles, and forcing the city's mayor to strip off his shirt and instead wear a T-shirt with protest messages. Protests ended after the government promised to permanently suspend the project.

== Background ==
The coastal city of Qidong is located at the mouth of the Yangtze River, approximately one hour north of Shanghai. The city's economy is centered largely on the fishing industry, and is a major source of lobster and shrimp exports. In 2007, the Oji Paper Company began construction of a paper mill in the city of Nantong, Jiangsu, located approximately 100 km inland from the coast. A wastewater pipeline was designed to carry approximately 150,000 tons of waste water per day from Nantong to the coast off Qidong. Although representatives of the paper company gave assurances that the water would be purified to meet environmental standards, Qidong residents feared the discharge would pollute water supplies, adversely affecting the fishing industry and drinking water. Some residents further claimed that they were not properly consulted about the project.

== Protest ==
On 28 July, roughly 10,000 Qidong residents took to the streets to demand the suspension of the pipeline project. An estimated 1,000 protesters stormed government buildings, where they were reportedly seen "smashing computers, overturning desks and throwing documents out of the windows to loud cheers from the crowd," according to The Guardian. Information circulated on the popular microblogging site Sina Weibo said that the protesters discovered condoms and expensive liquor in government offices. The city's mayor, Sun Jianhua, was stripped of his shirt and then made to wear an opposition T-shirt. At least five cars were overturned, and protesters clashed violently with police. A reporter with Asahi Shimbun was reportedly beaten by security forces while taking photographs of protesters "under attack by police."

== Analysis ==
The protest Qidong was part of a series of large-scale environmental protests related to industrial projects in China. Less than one month earlier, a large, student-led protest in Shifang stopped construction on a massive copper smelting plant. Earlier, protesters in Dalian similarly succeeded in getting a chemical factory shut down due to environmental concerns. Willy Wo-Lap Lam suggests that the protest in Qidong was representative of a growing rights consciousness among Chinese citizens, as well as a greater willingness to assert those rights. Lam noted that while authorities crack down "mercilessly" on protests perceived as being anti-Communist Party or anti-government, they are "willing to strike a deal" when the protests related to environmental or economic concerns, as in the case of Qidong.

The Qidong Protest had the effect of inflaming anti-Japanese sentiment in China. The Wall Street Journal reported on nationalist comments posted on China's Weibo blogging site: "How can a Japanese paper factory come and damage Chinese people's health and our environment? How can we with our 1.3-billion population be afraid of that little Japan?," wrote one user from Guangdong province. Other called for a boycott of Japanese products.

== See also ==
- Shifang protest
