= Confederation of Indigenous Nationalities of Ecuador =

Indigenous people's organization in Ecuador

- Confederación de Nacionalidades Indígenas del Ecuador

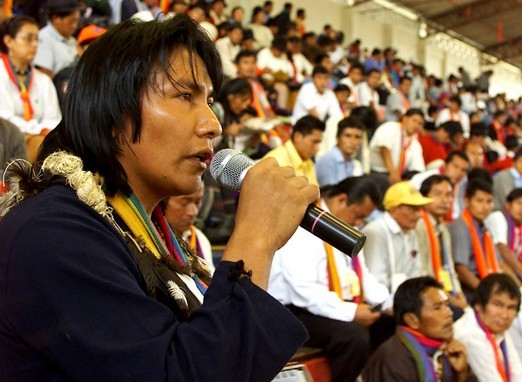
- Bartolo Ushigua, Zapara delegate at the 2nd CONAIE congress
- Abbreviation: CONAIE
- Formation: 1986; 40 years ago
- Region served: Ecuador
- President: Marlon Vargas
- Website: conaie.org

The Confederation of Indigenous Nationalities of Ecuador (Spanish: Confederación de Nacionalidades Indígenas del Ecuador) or, more commonly, CONAIE, is Ecuador's largest indigenous rights organization. The Ecuadorian Indian movement under the leadership of CONAIE is often cited as the best-organized and most influential Indigenous movement in Latin America.

Formed in 1986, CONAIE firmly established itself as a powerful national force in May and June 1990 when it played a role in organising a rural uprising on a national scale. Thousands of people blocked roads, paralyzed the transport system, and shut down the country for a week while making demands for bilingual education, agrarian reform, and recognition of the plurinational state of Ecuador. This was the largest uprising in Ecuador's history and established a new form of contention that would serve as a blueprint for a string of later uprisings.

CONAIE-led uprisings had a role in the fall of president Abdalá Bucaram and subsequent drafting of a new constitution in 1998. CONAIE leaders also participated in the 2000 coup d'état that deposed president Jamil Mahuad.

== Overview ==
CONAIE's political agenda includes the strengthening of a positive Indigenous identity, recuperation of land rights, environmental sustainability, opposition to neoliberalism and rejection of U.S. military involvement in South America (for example Plan Colombia).

The Indigenous movement in Ecuador was consolidated during the 1990 uprising when CONAIE leaders issued 16 demands, the first of which was the declaration of Ecuador as a plurinational state. The return of lands to Indigenous people and control over territory have been consistent central demands for the Indigenous movement in Ecuador. In addition to these central concerns, CONAIE's 16-point platform broadly addressed cultural issues such as bilingual education and control of archaeological sites; economic concerns such as development programs; and political demands such as local autonomy.

The CONAIE position on the plurinational state was integrated into the 2008 constitution of Ecuador.

== Organization ==
CONAIE represents the following indigenous peoples: Shuar, Achuar, Siona, Secoya, Cofán, Huaorani, Záparo, Chachi, Tsáchila, Awá, Epera, Manta, Wancavilca and Quichua.

CONAIE was founded in 1986 from the union of two confederations of Indigenous nations: the Confederation of Indigenous Nationalities of the Ecuadorian Amazon (CONFENIAE) in the eastern Amazon region, and The Confederation of Peoples of Quichua Nationality (ECUARUNARI) in the central mountain region.

== History ==
CONAIE was founded at a convention of some 500 indigenous representatives on November 13–16, 1986.

Initially forbidding its leaders from holding political office, CONAIE opposed alliances with political parties and presidential candidates. Instead, it promoted local campaigns. By 1996, however, grassroots pressure had pushed the organisation to rethink their position on electoral politics, with the president of CONAIE, Luis Macas running for national congress and the launching of the Pachakutik Plurinational Unity Movement - a political party based on the Indigenous movement.

Through the 1990s and early 2000s, CONAIE organised at least five national Indigenous uprisings, mobilising thousands of campesinos to shut down Quito. During these uprisings CONAIE made demands for land rights and plurinationalism while protesting corruption, deregulation, privatisation, and dollarisation of the Ecuadorian economy.

Beginning in 1993, CONAIE supported lawsuits against Chevron saying that the corporation deliberately dumped billions of gallons of toxic oil waste onto Indigenous lands as a cost-saving measure at the Lago Agrio oil fields.

=== 1990 uprising ===
In May/June 1990, CONAIE organised the largest uprising in Ecuador's history, using trees and boulders to block roads, paralyze the transport system, and shutting down the country for a week. The 1990 uprising is generally regarded as marking the emergence of Indigenous peoples as new political actors on the national level, as CONAIE forced negotiation on their demands for bilingual education, agrarian reform, and recognition of the plurinational state of Ecuador.

The 1990 uprising marked the 500th anniversary since Columbus' first trip to the Americas. In Quito, protestors occupied the Santa Domingo Church and, protesting the failure of the legal system to process land claims. The protesters intended to occupy the church until CONAIE was able to meet with a government representative to discuss changes in policy regarding their land claim issues. Police surrounded the church. The occupiers in the Santa Domingo church were about to begin a hunger strike when "hundreds of thousands of Indians, in some areas with the support of mestizo peasants, blocked local highways and took over urban plazas. Their demands were focused mostly on land, but also included such issues as state services, cultural rights, and the farm prices of agricultural products. This movement caused so much disruption that the government relented and met with the leaders of CONAIE; the government made some concessions to people in rural areas and settled some land disputes, but the status of ancestral lands in the lowlands remained an unresolved issue.

=== 1992-1994 uprisings advocating for land and water rights ===
In April 1992, two thousand Kichwa, Shuar, and Achuar people marched 240 miles (385 kilometers) from the Amazon to Quito to demand legalization of land holdings. Protestors refused to leave the capital until President Rodrigo Borja agreed to demarcate and title their lands.

In June 1994, Indigenous organizations protested a neoliberal economic reforms and privatisation of water resources. A coalition of Indigenous groups called for an uprising that shut down the country for several days in opposition to an Agrarian Reform Law that provided state support for capitalist agriculture, eliminated communal property, and privatized irrigation water. President Sixto Durán was forced to negotiate, and the final version of the law supported peasant agriculture, recognised water as a public resource, and reaffirmed communal land ownership.

=== Pachakutik ===
CONAIE initially forbid its members from holding political office, but in its December 1995 assembly it played a major role in the formation of the Pachakutik Plurinational Unity Movement, an electoral coalition of Indigenous and non-Indigenous social movements including CONFEUNASSC-CNC, Ecuador's largest campesino federation.

Pachakutik won 10% of the congressional seats in the 1996 elections, though the presidential candidate Freddy Ehlers failed to qualify for the second presidential round of votes.

=== 1997 uprising and constitutional assembly ===
In August 1997 CONAIE led two straight days of protest demanding constitutional reform. CONAIE's leadership had a role in the fall of president Abdali Bucaram and the convening of a constitutional assembly. The resulting 1998 constitution defined Ecuador as a multiethnic and multicultural state. Many new rights were explicitly granted to indigenous groups in the new document, including "the right to maintain, develop, and fortify their spiritual, cultural, linguistic, social, political and economic identity and traditions." Through the constitution the state was given many new responsibilities and standards to follow in terms of environmental conservation, the elimination of contamination, and sustainable management. It also included the right of free, prior, informed consent for development projects on Indigenous lands. Finally, the document provides protection of self-determination among indigenous lands, preserving traditional political structures, and follows International Labour Organization, Convention 169 that outlines generally accepted international law on indigenous rights. All of these points had been sought after for so many years and were finally guaranteed in this rewrite of the most important document in the country.

Despite CONAIE and Pachakutik's triumph in this endeavor, government implementation of the policy has not exactly been consistent with the outline in that new constitution and the indigenous organizations have struggled since 1998. In cases such as ARCO’s deal to exploit oil resources in the Amazon, the government has totally ignored these new indigenous rights and sold communal land to be developed without another thought. Such violations have become commonplace and the reformation of the constitution seems in many ways to have just been a populist tactic used by the government to appease the indigenous groups while continuing to persistently pursue its neoliberal agenda. Because of this there has been an increasing amount of tension and differences of opinion within the indigenous movement, both between Pachakutik and CONAIE and within CONAIE itself. There even exists frustration among local tribes and the efforts of CONAIE because of the inability to stop the aggression of the government despite all that had been achieved.

=== 1998-99 uprisings and 2000 coup d'état ===
Because of falling oil prices and agricultural failures, Ecuador experienced an economic collapse in 1998–99. President Jamil Mahuad sought a stabilisation loan from the IMF, but popular resistance to IMF reforms led to three large uprisings in 1998 and 1999 led by CONAIE. At the end of 1999, Mahuad announced plance to implement the IMF measures and dollarise the Ecuadorian economy.

On January 21, 2000, in response to Mahuad's plans, CONAIE, in coordination with organizations like CONFEUNASSC-CNC, blocked roads and cut off agricultural supplies to Ecuador's major cities. At the same time, rural indigenous protesters marched on Quito. In response, government officials ordered transit lines not to service Indians and individuals with indigenous characteristics were forcibly removed from interprovincial buses in an effort to prevent protesters from reaching the capitol. Nevertheless, 20,000 arrived in Quito where they were joined by students, local residents, 500 military personnel, and a group of rogue colonels.

Angry demonstrators led by Colonel Lucio Gutiérrez and CONAIE president Antonio Vargas stormed the Congress of Ecuador and declared a new "National Salvation Government". Five hours later, the armed forces called for the resignation of President Mahuad. For a period of less than 24 hours, Ecuador was ruled by a three-man junta – CONAIE's president Antonio Vargas, army colonel Lucio Gutiérrez, and retired Supreme Court justice Carlos Solórzano.

Only a few hours after taking the presidential palace, Col. Gutiérrez other collaborators handed over power to the armed forces' chief of staff, General Carlos Mendoza. That night Mendoza was contacted by the Organization of American States as well as the U.S. State Department, which hinted at the imposition of a Cuban-style isolation on Ecuador if power was not returned to the neoliberal Mahuad administration. Additionally, Mendoza was contacted by senior White House policy makers who threatened to end all bilateral aid and World Bank lending to Ecuador. The next morning, General Mendoza dissolved the new government and ceded power to Vice President Gustavo Noboa.

=== 2002 elections and the FTAA ===
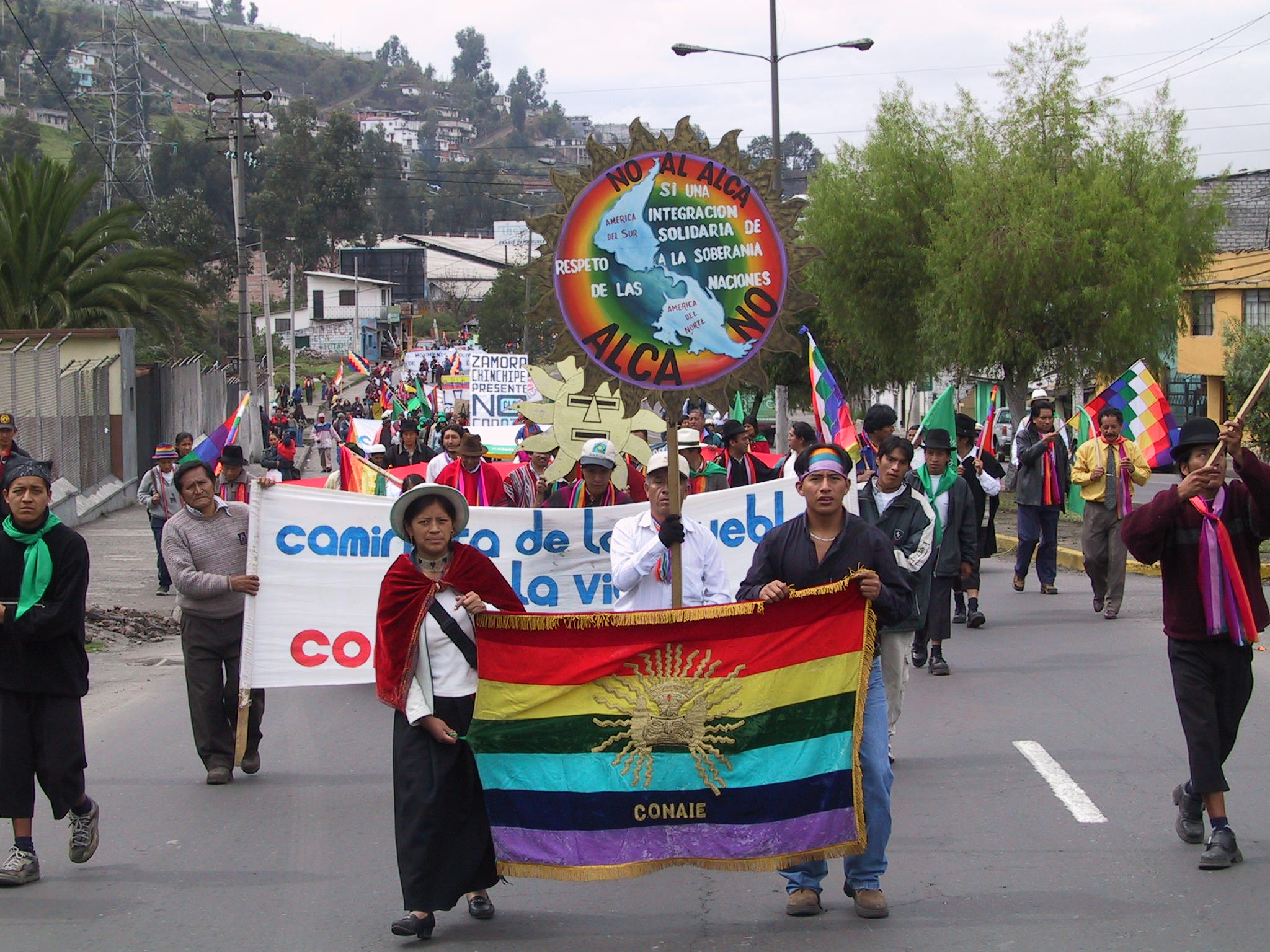
Members of CONAIE marched against the FTAA summit in Quito (October 31, 2002)

In 2002, CONAIE split its resources between political campaigning and a mobilization against the Free Trade Area of the Americas (FTAA) 7th Summit, which was being held in Quito.

In the presidential elections CONAIE backed populist Lucio Gutiérrez, a military man who had supported the 2000 coup. Gutiérrez was not widely trusted, but he was seen as the only alternative to rival candidate Álvaro Noboa, the richest man in Ecuador who embodied popular fears of crony capitalism.

Lucio Gutiérrez won the presidential race with 55% of the final vote, owing much of his victory to support from Pachakutik.

=== 2005 uprising ===
Six months after the election of Gutiérrez, CONAIE proclaimed its official break with the government in response to what CONAIE termed a betrayal of "the mandate given to it by the Ecuadorian people in the last elections." Among other things, Gutiérrez's signing of a Letter of Intent with the International Monetary Fund sparked outrage. (see Indigenous Movement Breaks with President Lucio Guiterrez)

In 2005, CONAIE participated in an uprising which ousted president Lucio Gutiérrez. In an April 2005 Assembly of Peoples, and in their own contentious assembly in May, CONAIE made public calls for the ouster of both Gutiérrez and the entire mainstream political class under the slogan "Que se vayan todos" (They all must go), a phrase popularized by the December 2001 Argentine uprising.

In August 2005 CONAIE called for action among indigenous peoples in the Sucumbios and Orellana provinces to protest political repression, Petrobras' attempt to expand their petroleum extracting activities to the Yasuní National Park, and the general activities of Occidental Petroleum in the Amazon. Hundreds of protestors from the Amazon region took control of airports and oil installations in the two provinces for five days, which has prompted a strong response from Alfredo Palacio's government in Quito. The government called for a state of emergency in the two provinces and the army was sent in to disperse the protestors with tear gas, but in response to the growing crisis the state oil company has temporarily suspended exports of petroleum. Protestors have gone on record as saying that they want oil revenues to be redirected toward society, making way for more jobs and greater expenditures in infrastructure.

=== 2010 and 2014 protests against water privatisation ===
A water bill proposed by the government of Rafael Correa was opposed by Indigenous organisations who charged that the legislation would allow transnational mining corporations to appropriate water (and privatisation of water in general), and that the bill would violate protection of water provided by the 2008 constitution. In April and May 2010 massive nationwide protests condemned Correa's legislation; protestors viewed the water bill as a neoliberal, extractivist policy that violated the tenets of sumak kawsay. CONAIE coordinated a National Mobilization in Defense of Water, Life, and Food Sovereignty, and protests blockaded the congressional building and roads across the country. Police responded with violent repression, but the campaign did result in the delay of the water law pending a referendum in Indigenous communities.

In 2014, the government fast-tracked a new water law that allowed the privatisation of water and permitted extractive activities near freshwater sources. Indigenous organisations responded with a Walk for Water, Life and People's Freedom beginning in June 2014 from the Zamora-Chinchipe province to Quito.

=== 2012 protests ===
In 2012, the Ecuadorian government under Rafael Correa made agreements with China to enable investment of $1.4 billion to develop copper-gold mines in the Amazon rainforest in the Zamora Chinchipe province. Following these agreements, CONAIE organized several weeks of marching and demonstration in 2012 demanding consultation with affected Indigenous people and protection of water. Chinese companies eventually developed the Mirador mine, which exported its first copper in 2019, although Indigenous opposition stopped development of the San Carlos Panantza mine in 2020.

=== 2013 ===
The largest involvement CONAIE has had in recent politics is with large national oil companies who wish to drill and build on indigenous land. On "November 28th, 2013, plain-clothes officers in Quito, Ecuador summarily closed the offices of Fundación Pachamama, a nonprofit that for 16 years has worked in defense of the rights of Amazonian indigenous peoples and the rights of nature. The dissolution, which the government blamed on their “interference in public policy,” was a retaliatory act that sought to repress Fundación Pachamama's legitimate right to disagree with the government's policies, such as the decision to turn over Amazonian indigenous people's land to oil companies."

=== 2015 ===
The 2015 Ecuadorian protests were a series of protests against the government of President Rafael Correa. Protests began in the first week of June, triggered by legislation increasing inheritance and capital gains taxes. By August, an alliance of rural farmworkers, Indigenous federations such as CONAIE, student groups, and labor unions had organised protests involving hundreds of thousands of people with a wide range of grievances, including the controversial tax laws; constitutional amendments removing presidential term limits; expanding oil and mining projects; water, education, and labour policies; a proposed free trade agreement with the European Union; and increasing repression of freedom of speech. On August 15, the government declared a state of exception that allowed the military to crackdown on protests.

Protestors blocked roads and declared a general strike in August. Violence and human rights violations were reported in clashes between militarised police and protestors.

Protestors stated that Correa wanted to follow "the same path as Venezuela's government," creating a "criminal war of classes," while President Correa stated that the protests were aimed at destabilizing the government, and the proposed measures were for combatting inequality.

=== 2019 protests over austerity measures ===
The 2019 Ecuadorian protests were a series of protests and riots against austerity measures including the cancellation of fuel subsidies, adopted by President of Ecuador Lenín Moreno and his administration. Organized protests ceased after indigenous groups and the Ecuadorian government reached a deal to reverse the austerity measures, beginning a collaboration on how to combat overspending and public debt.

=== 2022 uprising ===
A series of protests against the economic policies of Ecuadorian president Guillermo Lasso, triggered by increasing fuel and food prices, began on 13 June 2022. Initiated by and primarily attended by Indigenous activists, in particular the Confederation of Indigenous Nationalities of Ecuador (CONAIE), the protests have since been joined by students and workers who have also been affected by the price increases. Lasso condemned the protests and labelled them as an attempted "coup d'état" against his government.

As a result of the protests, Lasso has declared a state of emergency. As the protests have blocked exits, entries and ports in Quito and Guayaquil, there have been food and fuel shortages across the country as a result. Lasso has been criticized for allowing violent and deadly responses towards protestors. The President narrowly escaped impeachment in a vote in National Assembly on 29 June: 81 MPs voted in favour of impeachment, 42 voted against and 14 abstained; 92 votes were needed to achieve impeachment.

== Leadership ==
CONAIE’s past presidents include:

- Miguel Tankamash (Shuar)
- Luis Macas (Kichwa Saraguro)
- Antonio Vargas (Kichwa Amazónico)
- Leonidas Iza (Kichwa Panzaleo)
- Marlon Santi (Kichwa Sarayaku)
- Humberto Cholango (Kichwa Kayambi)
- Jorge Herrera (Kichwa Panzaleo)
- September 2017 – May 2021: Jaime Vargas Vargas (Ashuar)
- Manuel Castillo
- June 2021 – present: Leonidas Iza

== See also ==
- American Indian Movement
- Anti-globalization
- Indigenous Movements in the Americas
- Indigenous peoples in Ecuador
