= San Carlos Panantza mine =

Copper mine in Zamora-Chinchipe, Ecuador

San Carlos mine
- Location: Zamora-Chinchipe Province, Ecuador
- Products: Copper

The San Carlos Panantza mine is a large copper mine located in the south of Ecuador in Zamora-Chinchipe Province. San Carlos-Panantza is one of the largest copper reserves in Ecuador and in the world having, estimated reserves of 600 million tonnes of ore grading 0.59% copper. The mine is in the Corriente copper belt along with the Mirador mine. It is being developed by ExplorCobres S.A., a subsidiary of the state-owned Chinese company CRCC-Tongguan Investment Co. Ltd which is also developing Mirador.

Operations were halted at San Carlos Panantza by Indigenous Shuar resistance in late 2020. The mine's opposition demands consultation with Indigenous people and protection of water; foreign investment in Ecuador's mining industry has been opposed before, during the 2012 Ecuadorian protests.
