= Cordillera del Cóndor =

Mountain range in western South America, part of the Ecuador-Peru Border

Highest point
- Elevation: 2,950 m (9,680 ft)

Dimensions
- Area: 25,857 km^{2} (9,983 mi^{2})

Geography
- Location within Ecuador
- Location: boundary of Ecuador and Peru
- Range coordinates: 4°0′S 78°30′W

The Cordillera del Cóndor (Condor mountain range) is a mountain range in the eastern Andes that is shared by and part of the international border between Ecuador and Peru.

The range extends approximately 150 kilometres (93 mi) north to south and its maximum elevation reaches approximately 2,900 metres (9,500 ft). The Río Santiago and Cenepa River flow along its eastern slopes on the Peruvian side. For over 160 years, the area of the border was in dispute, and sparked armed conflicts between the two countries in 1941, 1981 and 1995. After the border conflict of 1995, the two countries began diplomatic negotiations, resulting in the 1998 peace treaty that established the exact location of the international border.

The Cordillera del Condor is an area of great interest to biology, possibly having the richest flora in any area of the same size on the South American continent, and is considered by Conservation International to be one of the most important biodiversity areas on the planet. The cordillera has one of the highest concentrations of vascular plant species yet unknown to science. The area is part of the ecoregion of the Eastern Cordillera Real montane forests.

The area is also culturally sensitive and includes territory belonging to the Indigenous Shuar people. The ecological and cultural diversity of the Cordillera is threatened by gold and copper mining.

== Botanical expeditions ==
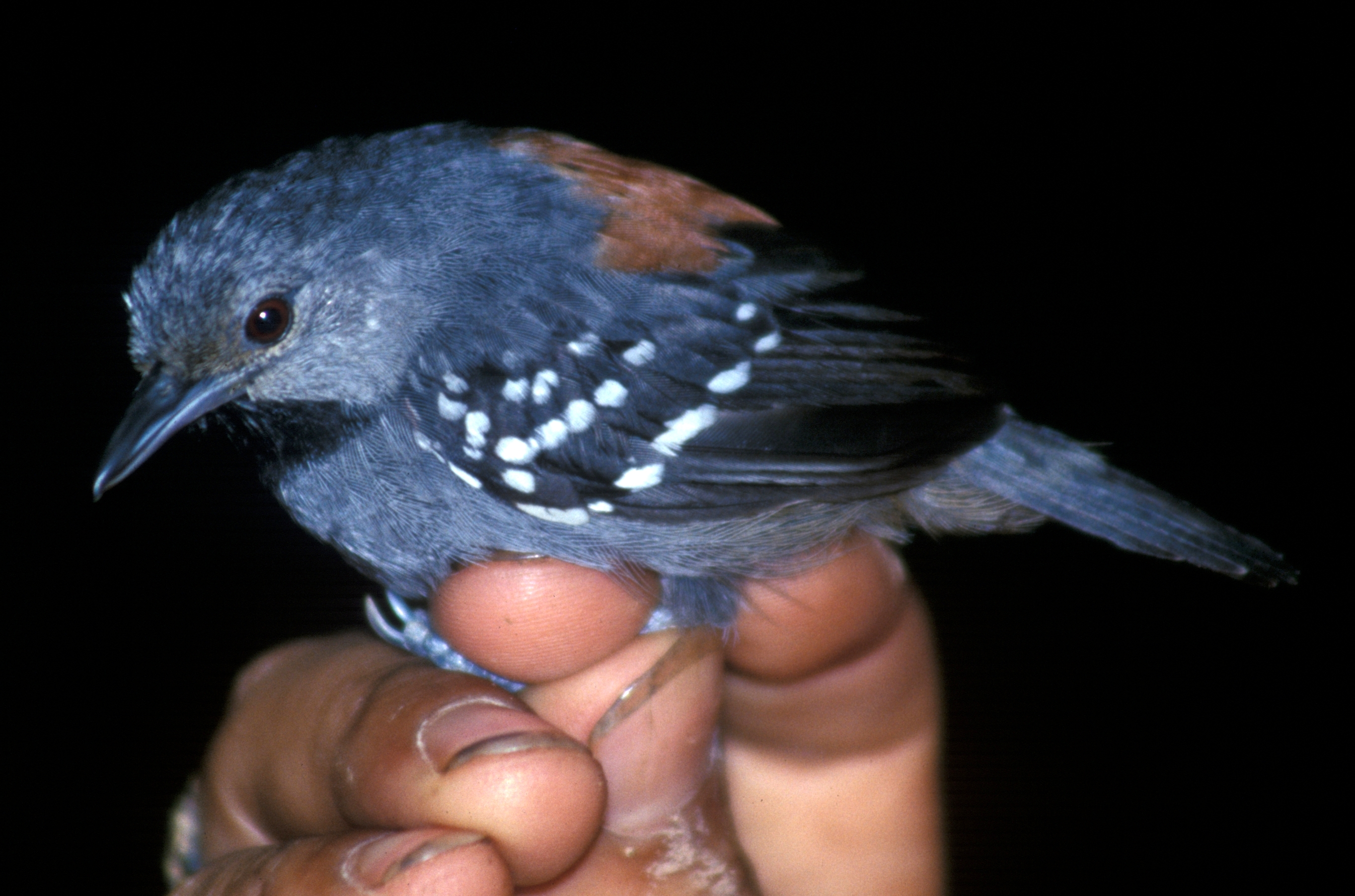
Ornate antwren (Epinecrophylla ornata) from the mountain range, which has a rich population of bird life.

In 1993, Alwyn Howard Gentry and his colleagues, in a trip organized by Conservation International and helicopter support provided by the Ecuadorian Army, were able to collect bromeliads from the prairies for the first time.

Robin Foster and Hamilton Beltrán conducted botanical inventories in 1995 on the Peruvian side of the border, on a second trip sponsored by Conservation International. Numerous collections of orchids from the region were made by Alexander Hirtz and Carlyle Luer. Following the armed conflict in January 1995, exploration of the biological region became impossible. José Eduardo Manzanares and Cave were perhaps the first botanists to visit the area after the signing the Peace Treaty of 1998, with a short visit in May 1998 to collect Bromeliaceae.

With the support of the National Geographic Society, the Missouri Botanical Garden and the National Herbarium of Ecuador, in December 2000 a series of expeditions were launched to make inventories of the flora in the Ecuadorian slopes of the cordillera, visiting places that no biologist had set foot in before, such as the Ijiach Naint hill in the Coangos River Basin. These recent field trips, carried out with the collaboration of the Shuar Federation, yielded a number of plants new to science, not seen in previous trips to other locations in the Cordillera del Condor.

== Mining ==
In 2000, copper rich ore was found in the Cordillera by David Lowell. Despite protest by local Shuar and Saraguro Kichwa communities, as well as environmental agencies (such as MiningWatch and OCMAL), the Ecuadorian government handed out concessions to multiple international mining companies (among which Aurelian and Ecuacorriente - a Chinese joint venture - as well as Corriente Resources of Canada, Kinross of Canada, and Lowell). Mining companies have developed several projects in the area, most notably the Mirador gold and copper mine, which began production in 2019 with its first shipment of copper to China.

The environmental effect of mining here is questionable. Some of the concessions cover protected forests and nature reserves. Besides destroying primary rainforest, and with it the habitat of many unique species, the storage of toxic mine waste in up-river impoundments may contaminate a huge ecosystem downstream.

Human rights violations have also been reported at Mirador. The mine is part of an ecologically and culturally sensitive area that includes territory of the Indigenous Shuar people. Locals report contamination of their rivers and several families being forcibly evicted from their homes. The Carnegie Endowment for International Peace reports that mining companies employed divide and conquer tactics to crush local resistance to the mine by enlisting local elites in side deals with, "perverse social and political effects"

Mining is ongoing.
