= 2012 Ecuadorian protests =

Environmental protests in Ecuador

- Date: March 2012
- Location: Ecuador
- Caused by: Environmental degradation Perceived threat to indigenous livelihoods Mining concessions in the Amazon
- Goals: Laws protecting water resources Consultation with indigenous communities over mining projects

Parties
| Government of Ecuador | Confederation of Indigenous Nationalities of Ecuador (CONAIE) |

Lead figures
| Rafael Correa | Humberto Cholango |

The 2012 Ecuadorian protests were a series of demonstrations by indigenous peoples who oppose the copper mining concessions in the province of Zamora-Chinchipe. On 22 March, the protesters reached the capital Quito to be met with counter protesters and warnings from the government and President Rafael Correa.

== Background ==
The protests commenced in part due to an agreement between Ecuador and Chinese company Ecuacorriente S.A. for a 25-year investment contract of US$1.4 billion (£900m) to develop the Mirador mine, an open-pit copper mine in the southeastern Amazonian region, including the province of Zamora-Chinchipe.

The Confederation of Indigenous Nationalities of Ecuador (CONAIE), the umbrella organisation leading the protest march, claim to represent a third of Ecuador's 14 million population. CONAIE also supported Correa in the 2006 election when he won his first term, as well as many of his programmes; however they later accused him of favouring free market policies in disregard of his original intentions. In the past their protests have led to the removals of presidents Abdalá Bucaram in 1997 and Jamil Mahuad in 2000.

=== Parallels ===
Similarly, in August 2011, protesters in Bolivia began a cross-country march against fellow pink tide President Evo Morales' initiative to build the Villa Tunari – San Ignacio de Moxos Highway through the Isiboro Sécure National Park and Indigenous Territory. CONAIE also sent Morales a letter of concern.

== Goals ==
Humberto Cholango, the head of CONAIE, said that the protest did not seek to oust President Rafael Correa, but only to seek the passing of laws to protect water resources and consultation with indigenous groups over future mining projects. CONAIE also said that many people would be forced off their land. They also claimed the policy would lead to more mining concessions. The protesters also seek Congress' denunciation of what they called the "criminalisation of social protest," the collection of new taxes and for the removal of "some" civil servants.

== Protest march ==
CONAIE, supported by some opposition parties and student and teachers' unions, organised the cross-country march starting from El Pangui, Zamora-Chinchipe. Several hundred indigenous Ecuadorians took part in the first stage in protest against the mining concessions in the Amazon basin, which they said would lead to environmental degradation and threaten their livelihoods. The organisers planned to cross several provinces before ending in Quito, on 22 March after the 700 kilometre march. On 22 March, about 1,000 of the indigenous protesters entered Quito from the south with a giant rainbow flag. CONAIE's Humberto Cholango said that they had not "come to destabilise."

=== Counter-protest ===
Nearly 10,000 Correa supporters were called out outside the presidential palace in Quito on 8 February to show their support for the president. As the protesters reached Quito on 22 March, the government of Ecuador called for guarding against a coup d'état. Correa spoke to his supporters, 500 of whom were indigenous protesters entering Quito from the north:

We will never talk to the corrupt right, with the liars! [The indigenous should not] be used. We know that mining is necessary for modern life. As well as the raw materials, we need the revenue so that we can care for handicapped people, pay for social security, build roads. These are the best negotiated contracts ever in world history. We got as much out of them as was possible.

== Responses ==
Zamora-Chinchipe's governor, Salvador Quishpe, said of the protesters planned expansion route that: "People are very motivated, there will always be more people in each village."

President Rafael Correa alleged that CONAIE sought to destabilise his government, while claiming the protest march would be a "resounding failure." He also claimed the mine would help fund other development projects as roads, schools and hospitals. Meanwhile, he also called for further mobilisations til 22 March saying: "Resist peacefully, on March 8 we will gather in Independence Square and say, 'Here we are and this revolution does not stop anything or anyone!'"

== See also ==
- List of protests in the 21st century
- 2004-2005 Ecuadorean protests
