= Xavier Enderica =

Ecuadorian Athlete, entrepreneur and political figure

Xavier Enderica Salgado
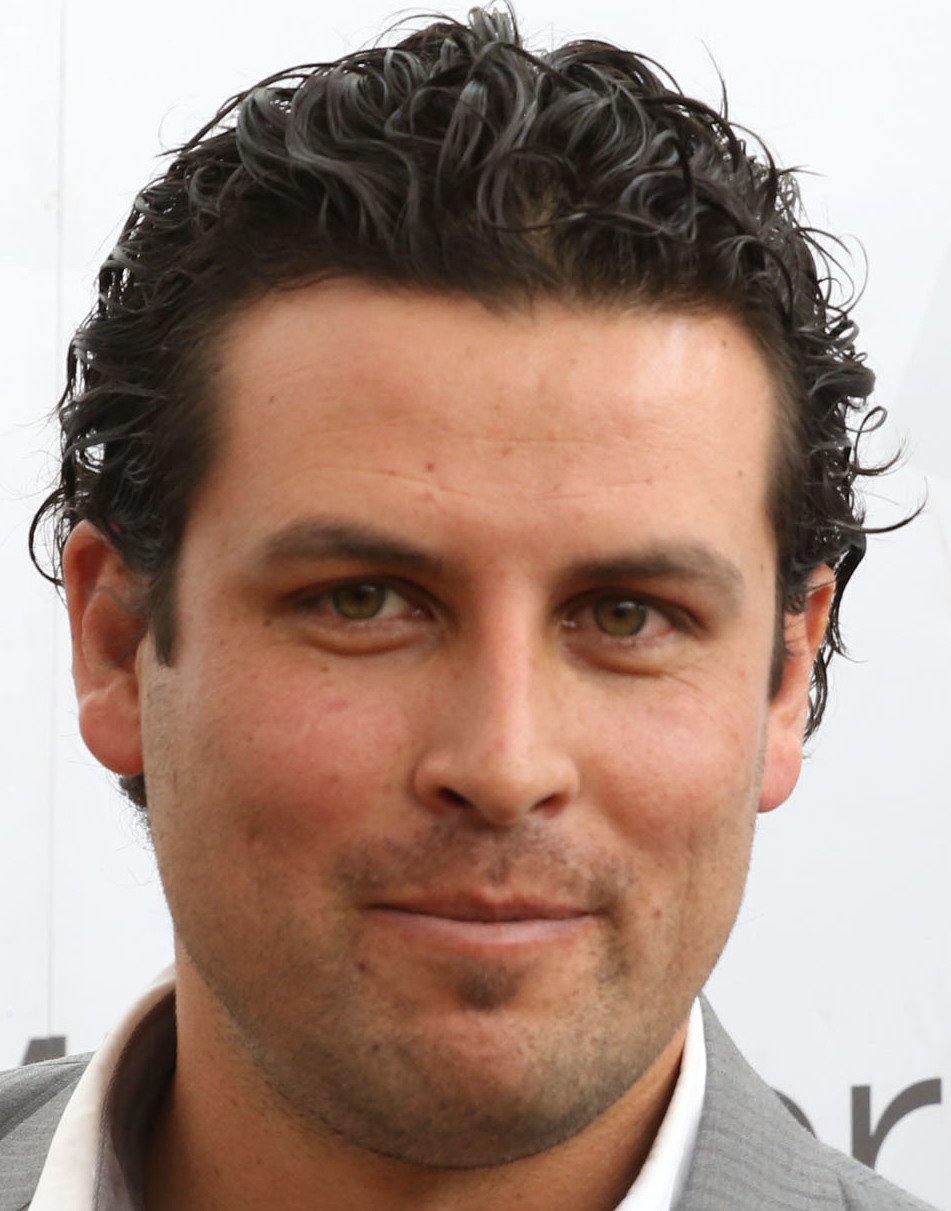
- Born: 1981 (age 44–45); Cuenca, Ecuador
- Education: Universidad Del Pacífico - Ecuador
- Occupation: Entrepreneur
- Title: Bachelors of Science in Business Administration
- Relatives: Esteban Enderica Salgado (brother); Juan Fernando Enderica Salgado (brother)

Governor of Azuay
- In office June 2017 – June 2019
- President: Lenin Moreno
- Preceded by: María Augusta Muñoz Zhunio
- Succeeded by: Oswaldo Larriva Alvarado

Minister of Sports
- In office January 2015 – January 2017
- President: Rafael Correa
- Preceded by: Catalina Ontaneda
- Succeeded by: Pamela Morcillo

Xavier Enderica (born in Cuenca, Ecuador on 11 February 1981) is an Ecuadorian athlete, entrepreneur and political figure.

== Biography ==
He completed his primary education in Colegio Particular Rafael Borja. He holds a Bachelors of Science in Business Administration and Marketing from Universidad Del Pacífico during which time he founded the Escuela de Natación Hermanos Enderica (Enderica Brothers Swimming School). Where his younger brother are Ecuadorian Elite Swimmers, and his older brother coaches.

He began his career as an athlete as a swimmer and later on as a triathlete with over 350 medals in different competitions. He was the first person from Azuay to set a national record. His experience in sports led him to be the president of the Sports Federation for Azuay. From there he jumped into his political career as a coordinator for the 6th Zone in the Ministry of Sports. After which he was nominated as Minister of Sports. During his time at the ministry, he inaugurated the high performance sports center in Cuenca.

In 2017 he was nominated as Governor of Azuay by President Lenin Moreno.
