= Ecuador–Mexico relations =

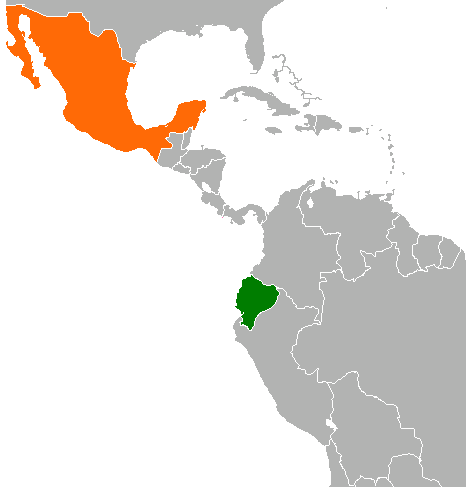

- Ecuador: Mexico

The nations of Ecuador and Mexico first established diplomatic relations in 1830. In April 2024, Mexico severed diplomatic relations due to a police raid on the Mexican Embassy in Quito. Since June 2024, Switzerland serves as the protecting power representing Ecuador's interests in Mexico and vice versa.

Both nations are members of the Community of Latin American and Caribbean States, Latin American Integration Association, Organization of American States, Organization of Ibero-American States and the United Nations.

== History ==
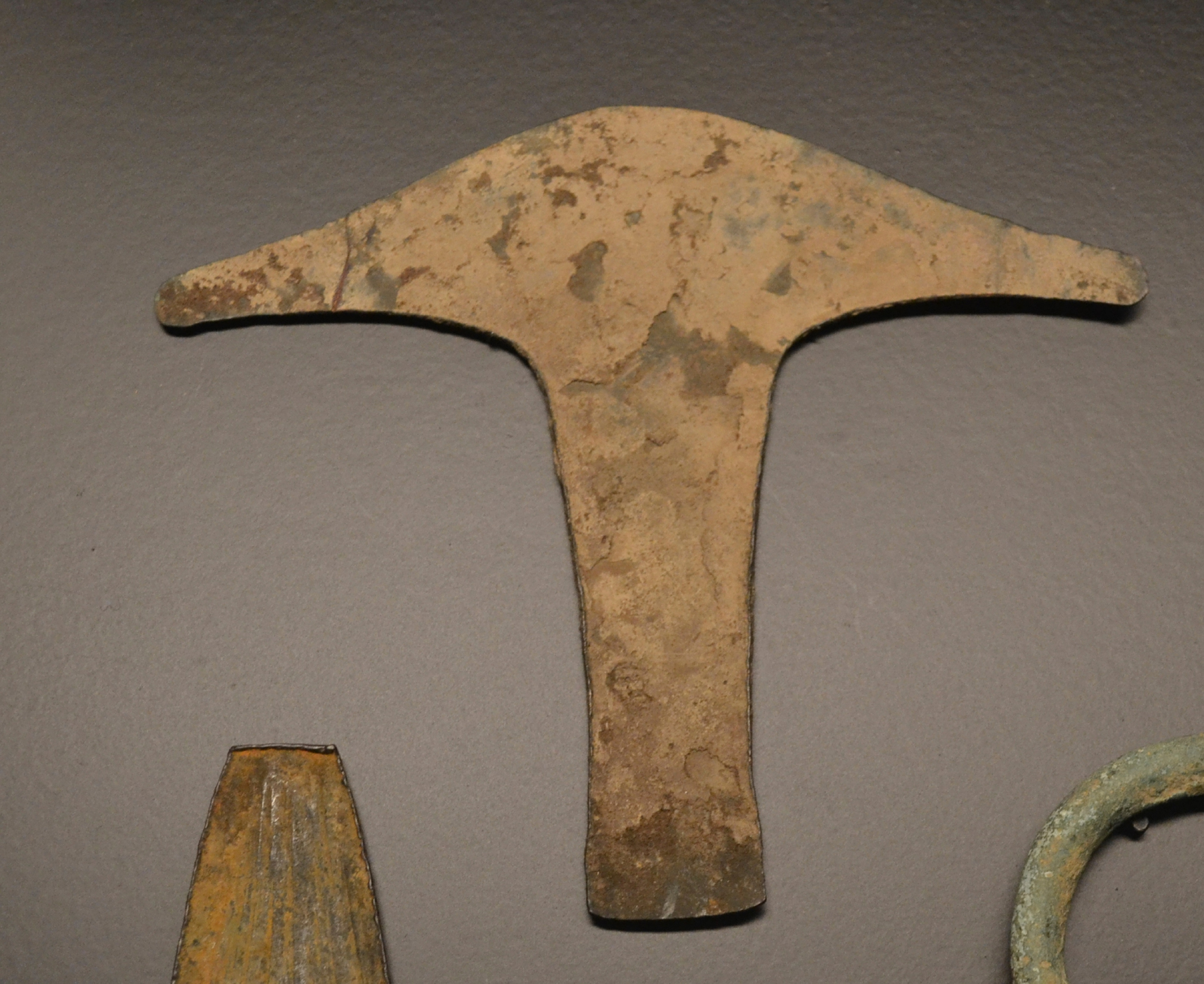
Axe-money from Mexico at the Prehistory Museum of Valencia

Possible encounters between indigenous cultures in both Ecuador and Mexico may have taken place as shown by Axe-monies as proof of economic and cultural exchange between the pre-Columbian cultures of western Mesoamerica and the northern Andes.

Both nations were once part of the Spanish Empire with Ecuador being part initially of the Viceroyalty of Peru and later the Viceroyalty of New Granada and Mexico as part of New Spain. In 1819, Ecuador was part of the Gran Colombia (which included present day Colombia, Ecuador, Panama and Venezuela). After its break up, Mexico recognized and established diplomatic relations with Ecuador in June 1830. In 1837, Mexico opened a consulate in Guayaquil which subsequently became its first diplomatic mission in South America.

In 1941, Ecuadorian President Carlos Alberto Arroyo del Río paid a visit to Mexico and met with President Manuel Ávila Camacho. In the 1970s, relations between the nations began to significantly develop. In 1974, Mexican President Luis Echeverría paid a state visit to Ecuador and met with President Guillermo Rodríguez. The two leaders signed several agreements on economic, scientific and cultural cooperation. Since then, there have been numerous high level visits between leaders of both nations to each other's country.

In December 2018, Ecuadoran President Lenín Moreno arrived to Mexico to attend the inauguration of Mexican President Andrés Manuel López Obrador. In August 2021, Ecuadorian President Guillermo Lasso paid a visit to Mexico and met with President López Obrador and Foreign Minister Marcelo Ebrard.

=== 2024 diplomatic crisis ===
In December 2023, former Ecuadorian Vice-President Jorge Glas entered the Mexican embassy in Quito and requested asylum. Glas had served as vice-president to presidents Rafael Correa and Lenín Moreno and is accused of corruption. The Mexican government did not grant Glas asylum and the Ecuadorian government declared it will not grant him safe conduct out of the country.

On 3 April 2024, Mexican President López Obrador implied that fraud had taken place in Ecuador's 2023 presidential elections. The Ecuadorian Government responded by expelling the Mexican ambassador from Ecuador. On 5 April 2024, Ecuadorian police officers forcibly entered the Mexican embassy in Quito, pushed the Mexican chargé d'affaires Roberto Canseco to the ground and arrested Jorge Glas within the embassy.

In response, President López Obrador instructed the Secretariat of Foreign Affairs to sever diplomatic relations with Ecuador.

== High-level visits ==
Presidential visits from Ecuador to Mexico

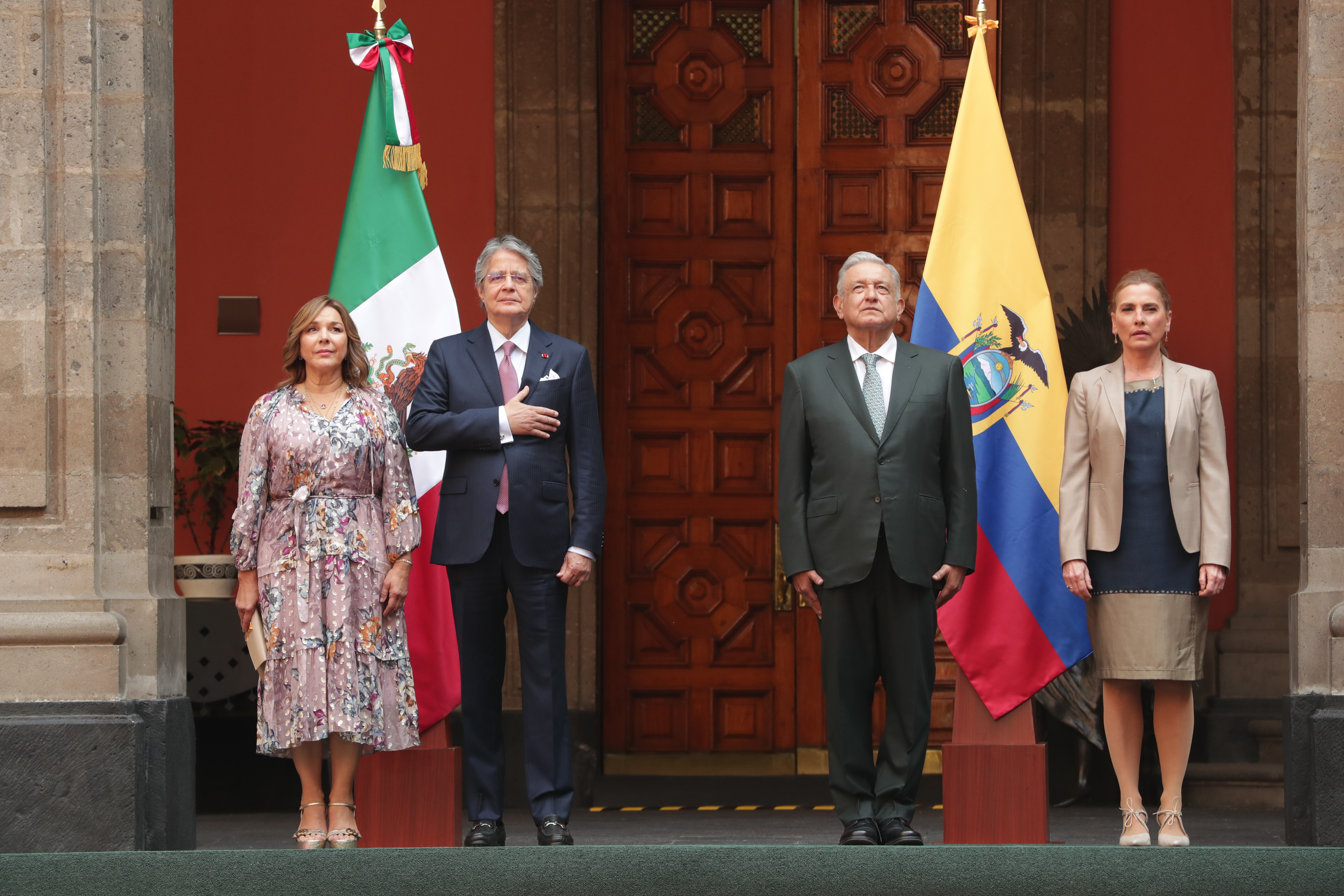
Ecuadorian President Guillermo Lasso with the Mexican President Andrés Manuel López Obrador in Mexico City; November 2022.

- President Carlos Alberto Arroyo del Río (1942)
- President Galo Plaza (1951)
- President León Febres Cordero (1985)
- President Rodrigo Borja Cevallos (1991)
- President Sixto Durán Ballén (1993)
- President Jamil Mahuad (1999)
- President Lucio Gutiérrez (2004)
- President Alfredo Palacio (2006)
- President Rafael Correa (2008, 2010, 2014)
- President Lenín Moreno (2018)
- President Guillermo Lasso (August & September 2021, 2022)

Presidential visits from Mexico to Ecuador

- President Luis Echeverría (1974)
- President Carlos Salinas de Gortari (1990)
- President Vicente Fox (2004)
- President Enrique Peña Nieto (2014, 2016)

== Bilateral agreements ==
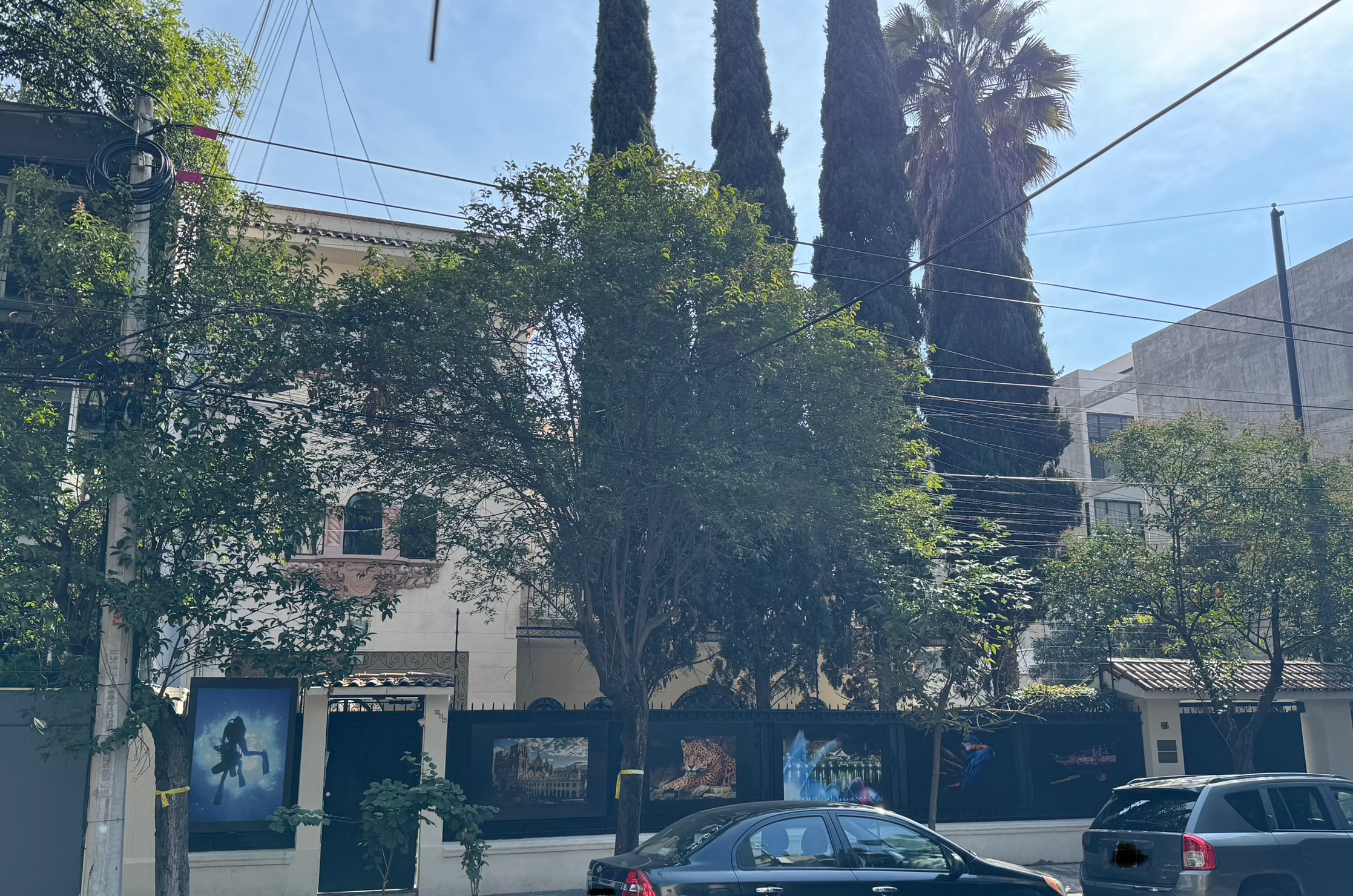
Former Embassy of Ecuador in Mexico City (currently an Interest Section)

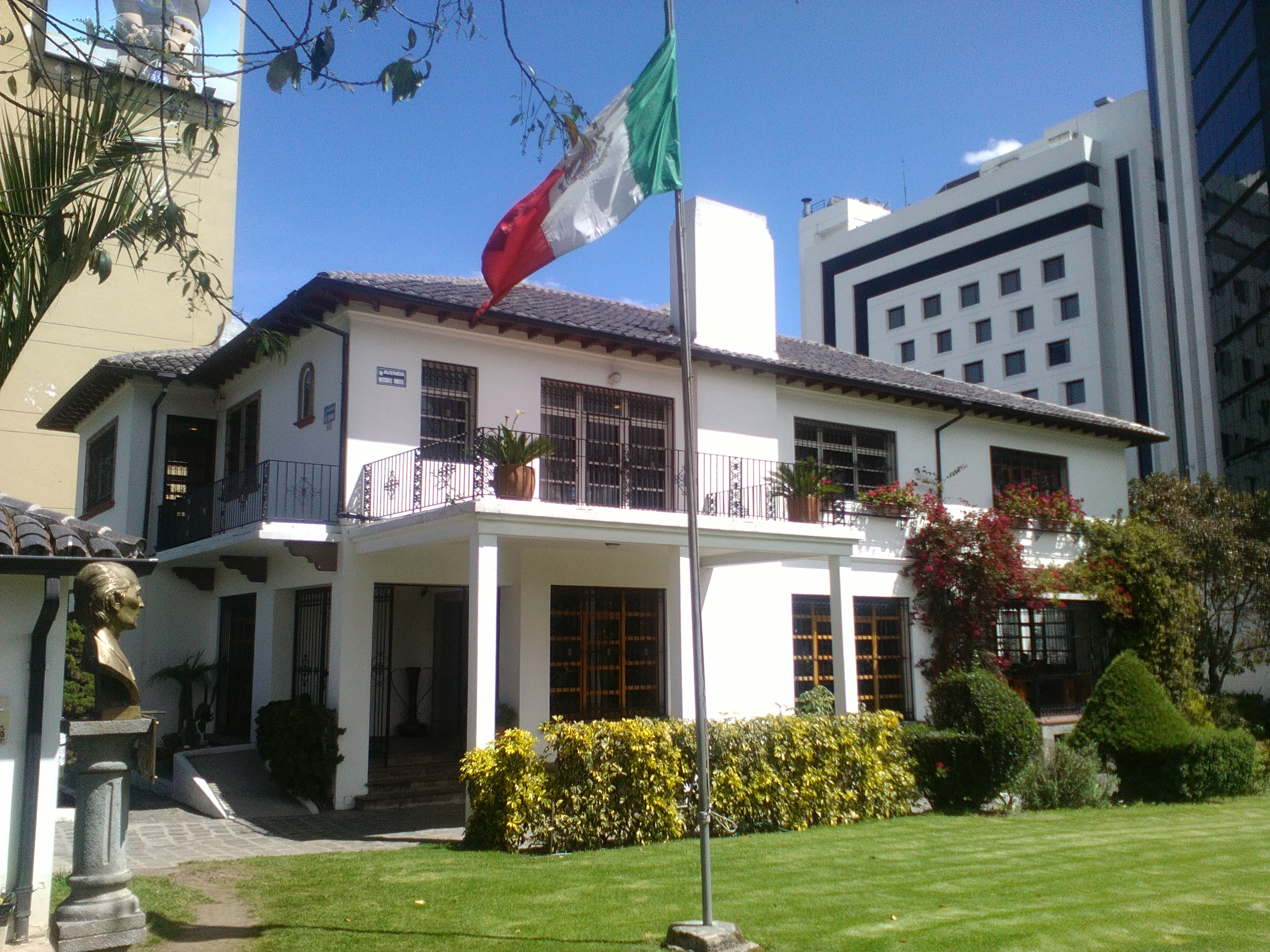
Former Embassy of Mexico in Quito (currently an Interest Section)

Both nations have signed several bilateral agreements such as a Treaty of Friendship, Commerce and Navigation (1888); Cultural Exchange Agreement (1974); Agreement of Cooperation to Combat Drug Trafficking and Drug Dependency (1990); Agreement on Scientific and Technical Cooperation (1992); Tourist Cooperation Agreement (1992); Agreement to Avoid Double Taxation and Prevent Tax Evasion on Income subject to Tax (1992); Agreement on Air Transportation (1995); Agreement on Legal Assistance in Criminal Matters (2004); Extradition Treaty (2006) and an Agreement on Mutual Recognition of Higher Education Studies issued by both nations (2008).

== Trade relations ==
In 2023, two-way trade between both nations totaled US$878 million. Ecuador's main exports to Mexico include: cocoa beans, palm oil, copper ores and their concentrates, electric motor parts and medicines. Mexico's main exports to Ecuador include: medicine, monitors and projectors, motor cars and vehicles, tubes and pipes, and food based products. Mexican multinational companies such as América Móvil, Cemex, FEMSA, Grupo Bimbo, Mabe, Orbia and OXXO (among others) operate in Ecuador.

== See also ==
- Foreign relations of Ecuador
- Foreign relations of Mexico
