= Jorge Glas =

Vice President of Ecuador from 2013 to 2018

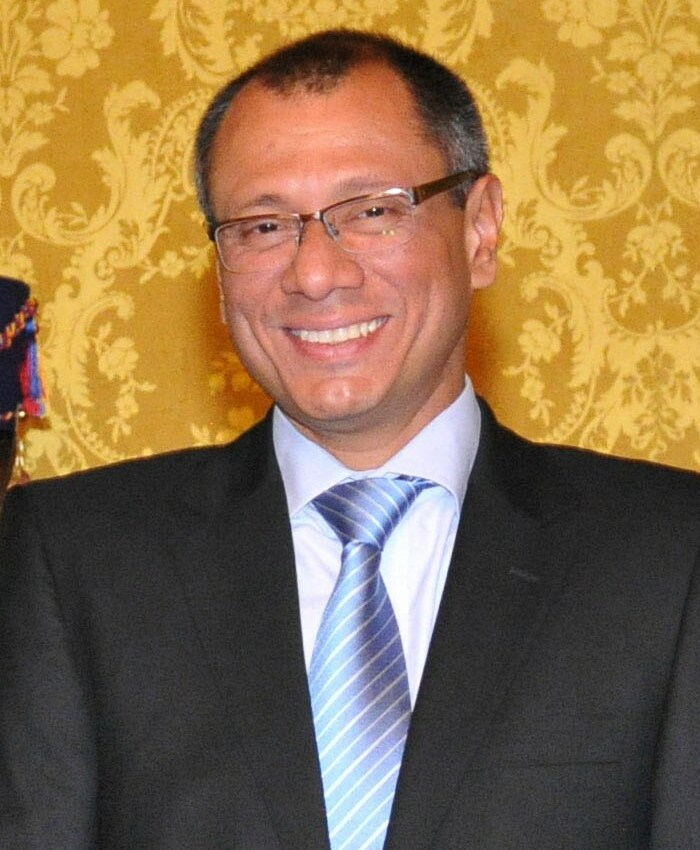
- Glas in 2013

48th Vice President of Ecuador
- In office 24 May 2013 – 3 January 2018 (Note: Suspended from 3 August 2017 until his removal from office. Powers and duties were transferred to María Vicuña.)
- President: Rafael Correa; Lenín Moreno
- Preceded by: Lenín Moreno
- Succeeded by: María Alejandra Vicuña

Coordinating Minister of Strategic Sectors
- In office 5 April 2010 – 10 November 2012
- President: Rafael Correa
- Preceded by: Galo Borja
- Succeeded by: Rafael Poveda

Minister of Telecommunications and Information Society
- In office 14 August 2009 – 3 April 2010
- President: Rafael Correa
- Preceded by: Position created
- Succeeded by: Jaime Guerrero

Personal details
- Born: Jorge David Glas Espinel; 13 September 1969 (age 57) Guayaquil, Ecuador
- Citizenship: Ecuador; Germany
- Party: Union for Hope
- Other political affiliations: PAIS Alliance
- Spouse: Cinthia Díaz Aveiga
- Parent(s): Jorge Glas Viejó; Norma Espinel Aráuz
- Education: ESPOL

Jorge David Glas Espinel (Spanish pronunciation: [ˈxoɾ.xe ðaˈβið ɣlas espiˈnel]; born 13 September 1969) is an Ecuadorian politician and electrical engineer. He served as Vice President of Ecuador from 24 May 2013 to 13 December 2017. Then Ecuadorian president Lenín Moreno suspended Glas of his official duties as vice president on 3 August 2017. In December 2017, Glas was sentenced to six years imprisonment by a Criminal Tribunal of the National Court of Justice, for receiving over $13.5 million in bribes in the Odebrecht scandal. In April 2024 during a raid on the Mexican embassy by Ecuadorian police, Glas was arrested and held in prison, resulting in Mexico severing relations with Ecuador.

== Early life and education ==
Jorge Glas was born 13 September 1969 in Guayaquil. His paternal grandfather was a German Jewish immigrant named Heriberto Glas Cohen who escaped the Nazi regime. For this reason, he holds German citizenship. He has known and been friends with Rafael Correa, the former president of Ecuador, since their time as boy scouts.

On 22 September 2008, Glas graduated in electrical and electronics engineering from the ESPOL. National Assembly member for the Patriotic Society Party, Galo Lara, reported Glas on 3 January 2013 to the police for plagiarism in his thesis and for holding public office while not being qualified to do so. Lara said that Glas during his term as General Manager of the Solidarity Fund needed an academic title of the third degree, which Glas did not have. Glas's thesis was reviewed by Genove Gneco, a professor from the Dominican Republic who found suspected plagiarism in four theses by top governmental officials in his own country, including then-President Danilo Medina. Gneco found 35% of Glas's thesis to be suspected plagiarism. An investigation by a commission set up by ESPOL acquitted Glas of plagiarism. Glas however recognized that he should have cited his sources better.

== Political career ==
Starting in 2007, Glas held several political appointments in the government of Rafael Correa. He was general manager of the now-closed Solidarity Fund between 2007 and 2009. The company was an amalgamation of several public companies of telecommunications and electricity generation and distribution. He was also president of the National Telecommunications Council. Afterwards, Glas was Minister of Telecommunications and later became Coordinating Minister of Strategic Sectors. He directed the merger of Andinatel S.A. and Pacifitel S.A. into the National Corporation of Telecommunications, a corporation of which he became the first chairperson. As Coordinating Minister of Strategic Sectors, he was responsible for building several hydroelectric stations.

In the 2013 Ecuadorian general election, Glas was elected Vice President of Ecuador. He commenced his term as vice president on 24 May 2013. On 4 August 2017, Glas was suspended from his duties as vice president by new president Lenín Moreno.

== Prison sentences ==
On 15 December 2017, Glas was sentenced to six years in prison for taking $13.5 million from Brazilian conglomerate Odebrecht. On 2 January 2018, under Ecuador's Constitution's Article 146, as Glas was unable to exercise his office for 90 days, he was stripped of his office. On 6 January 2018, María Alejandra Vicuña was formally sworn in as Vice President of Ecuador after the National Assembly voted to approve her for the position. In October 2019, The National Supreme Court of Justice reaffirmed his six-year prison sentence. Glas was imprisoned in Latacunga, south of Quito, in 2017. In April 2020, Glas was sentenced to 8 years in prison for aggravated bribery by a Court of the National Court of Justice. In addition, he lost his political rights for 25 years. In January 2021, Ecuador's Superior Court added another sentence of eight years in prison for misuse of public funds in an oil contract.

Glas was granted Habeas corpus on 10 April 2022, which allowed him to be released on parole for 40 days since his legal guarantees had been allegedly violated and also due to the inability to provide in prison the care that he needed for a health condition, which was revoked by a court in the province of Santa Elena and Jorge Glas was imprisoned again. In November 2022, Glas was released again, but could not leave the country during the remainder of his sentences. Then the attorney general's office said in a statement it was insisting on charging Glas with respect to the case involving public funds collected to aid the reconstruction of Manabí Province after a 2016 earthquake. In December 2023 Jorge Glas entered the Mexican embassy in Quito and asked for political asylum on the grounds he was being politically persecuted.

On 5 April 2024, Ecuadorian police raided the Mexican embassy in Quito and arrested Glas. Mexico had granted Glas asylum just prior to the raid. After the raid, Mexico severed diplomatic relations with Ecuador. The next day, Nicaragua broke ties with Ecuador in solidarity with Mexico.

On 9 April 2024, prison authorities said that Glas had been hospitalized in the Guayaquil naval hospital after not eating for 24 hours, adding that his condition was stable.

On 9 October 2024 the U.S. State Department banned Glas from entering the United States on charges of corruption.

On 5 January 2025, Glas was evacuated from La Roca prison in Guayaquil, after an alleged assassination attempt against him. On 30 June 2025, Glas was sentenced to another 13 years in prison for misusing public funds meant for reconstruction following the 2016 Ecuador earthquake. Glas was transferred to the El Encuentro maximum security prison on 11 November 2025.

== See also ==
- Ecuador–Mexico relations

== Notes ==
Political offices
Preceded by Lenín Moreno	Vice President of Ecuador; 2013–2017	Succeeded by María Vicuña
