= María Alejandra Vicuña =

Vice President of Ecuador in 2018

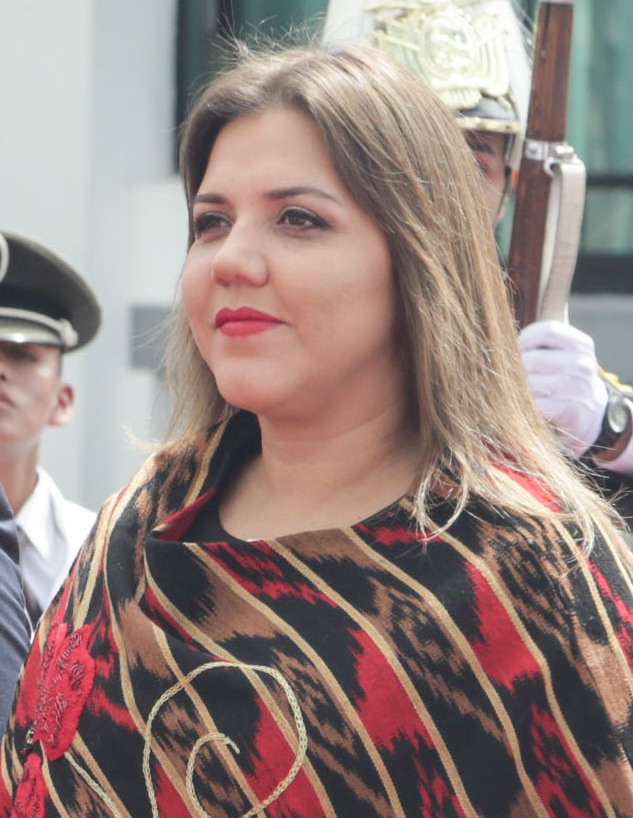
- Vicuña in 2018

49th Vice President of Ecuador
- In office 6 January 2018 – 4 December 2018; Acting: 4 October 2017 – 6 January 2018; Suspended from additional functions 3 December 2018
- President: Lenín Moreno
- Preceded by: Jorge Glas
- Succeeded by: Otto Sonnenholzner

Minister of Urban Development and Housing
- In office 24 May 2017 – 6 January 2018
- President: Lenin Moreno
- Preceded by: Lyne Miranda
- Succeeded by: Adrián Sandoya Unamuno

Personal details
- Born: María Alejandra Vicuña Muñoz; 13 February 1978 (age 47) Guayaquil, Ecuador
- Political party: PAIS Alliance

María Alejandra Vicuña Muñoz (born 13 February 1978) is an Ecuadorian politician who served as the Vice President of Ecuador under President Lenin Moreno between January and December 2018, previously as the Housing and Urban Development Minister of Ecuador.

== Career ==
Vicuña was first elected to serve in the National Assembly in 2009, and was re-elected to serve again in 2013. While serving in the National Assembly, she served as vice president of the largest commission relating to the health and wellbeing of Ecuadorian citizens, and was a founding member of the Commission on Education, Science, Technology, and Communication.

She was named Minister of Urban Development and Housing by President Lenin Moreno in May 2017. Upon the suspension of Vice President Jorge Glas, Vicuña was named Acting Vice President until a resolution on Glas's corruption charges was made.

== Vice President of Ecuador ==
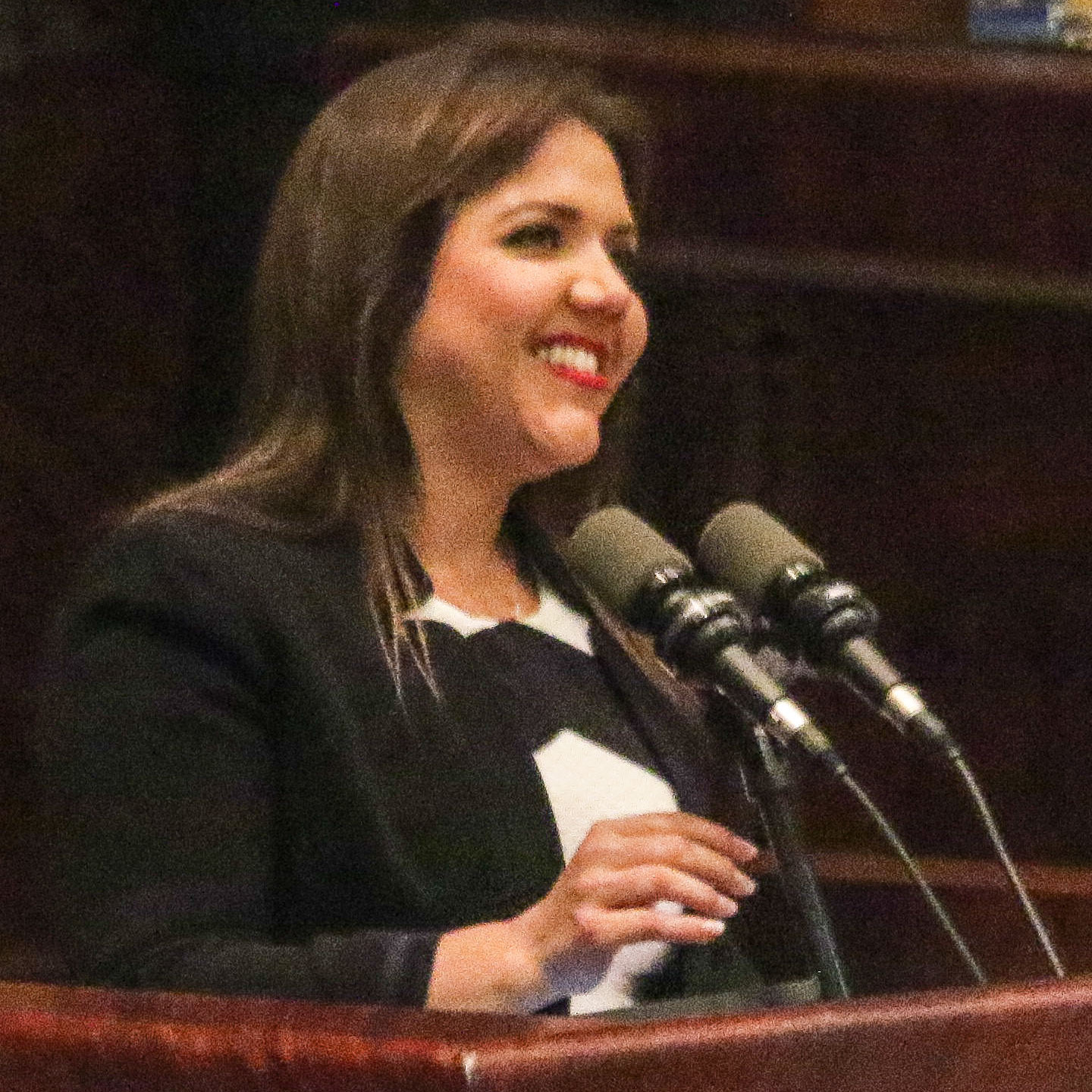
María Vicuña speaks after being sworn in as Vice President of Ecuador before the National Assembly

Glas was convicted of corruption in connection to the Odebrecht bribery scandal in December 2017. The National Assembly then elected a new Vice President from a candidate shortlist chosen by President Moreno.

On 6 January 2018, Vicuña was formally sworn in as Vice President of Ecuador. She was confirmed after 70 assembly members voted for her to take office, 17 lawmakers voting against the nomination, and 19 abstentions. She was the second woman to ever serve as Vice President of Ecuador, after Rosalía Arteaga took office in 1996.

On December 3, 2018, Vicuña was suspended from her duties as vice president after a corruption scandal. On 4 December 2018, Vicuña announced her desire to resign as vice president. On 11 December 2018, Otto Sonnenholzner was elected as Vice President of Ecuador after the National Assembly approved him for the position.

In 2020 she was sentenced to one year in prison for extorting payments from her political advisors in exchange for continued employment. In 2021, this sentence was increased to two years; in October 2022, the prison sentence was reduced to one year, but she was required to pay restitution within six months.

Political offices
Preceded by Jorge Glas	Vice President of Ecuador; 2018; Acting: 2017–2018	Succeeded by Otto Sonnenholzner
Preceded by Lyne Miranda	Minister of Urban Development and Housing of Eduador; 2017–2018	Succeeded by Adrián Sandoya Unamuno
