= Convention on Diplomatic Asylum =

- Type: Multilateral, inter-American
- Signed: 28 March 1954
- Location: Caracas, Venezuela
- Effective: 29 December 1954
- Condition: Deposit of second ratification
- Parties: Argentina, Brazil, Costa Rica, Dominican Republic, Ecuador, El Salvador, Guatemala, Haiti, Mexico, Panama, Paraguay, Peru, Uruguay, Venezuela
- Depositary: Organization of American States
- Languages: English, French, Portuguese, Spanish

Full text
- Convention on Diplomatic Asylum at Wikisource

The Convention on Diplomatic Asylum (Note: French: Convention sur l'asile diplomatique, Portuguese: Convenção sobre Asilo Diplomático, Spanish: Convención sobre Asilo Diplomático.) was signed on 28 March 1954 at the tenth Pan-American Conference, held in Caracas.

The signatories who ratified the convention were Argentina, Brazil, Costa Rica, Dominican Republic, Ecuador, El Salvador, Guatemala, Haiti, Mexico, Panama, Paraguay, Peru, Uruguay and Venezuela. Six other states signed but did not ratify it: Bolivia, Chile, Colombia, Cuba, Honduras and Nicaragua.

The convention followed the precedent established by the case of Víctor Raúl Haya de la Torre – a Peruvian politician who was granted asylum by Colombia in 1949, at their embassy in Lima, where he stayed for five years until being allowed to leave the country.

According to Quintana and Uriburu, the Convention reflected the "strong commitment of the majority of Latin American states to recognizing and strengthening the authority of the asylum-granting state" in response to the Haya de la Torre saga.
