= Ecuadorian Planning Zones =

The planning zones of Ecuador are administrative organization entities made up of joint provinces or metropolitan districts in order to decentralize administrative activities of the Ecuadorian State. The main agency in charge of zone planning is Senplades.

== Planning zones ==
There are nine planning zones in Ecuador:

1. Ecuador Planning Zone 1 : Esmeraldas, Imbabura, Carchi, Sucumbíos
2. Ecuador Planning Zone 2 : Pichincha, Napo, Orellana
3. Ecuador Planning Zone 3 : Cotopaxi, Tungurahua, Chimborazo, Pastaza
4. Ecuador Planning Zone 4 : Manabí, Santo Domingo de los Tsáchilas
5. Ecuador Planning Zone 5 : Santa Elena, Guayas, Bolívar, Los Ríos, Galápagos
6. Ecuador Planning Zone 6 : Cañar, Azuay, Morona Santiago
7. Ecuador Planning Zone 7 : El Oro, Loja, Zamora Chinchipe
8. Ecuador Planning Zone 8: Guayaquil, Samborondón, Durán
9. Ecuador Planning Zone 9: Distrito Metropolitano de Quito
