= Lenín Moreno =

President of Ecuador from 2017 to 2021

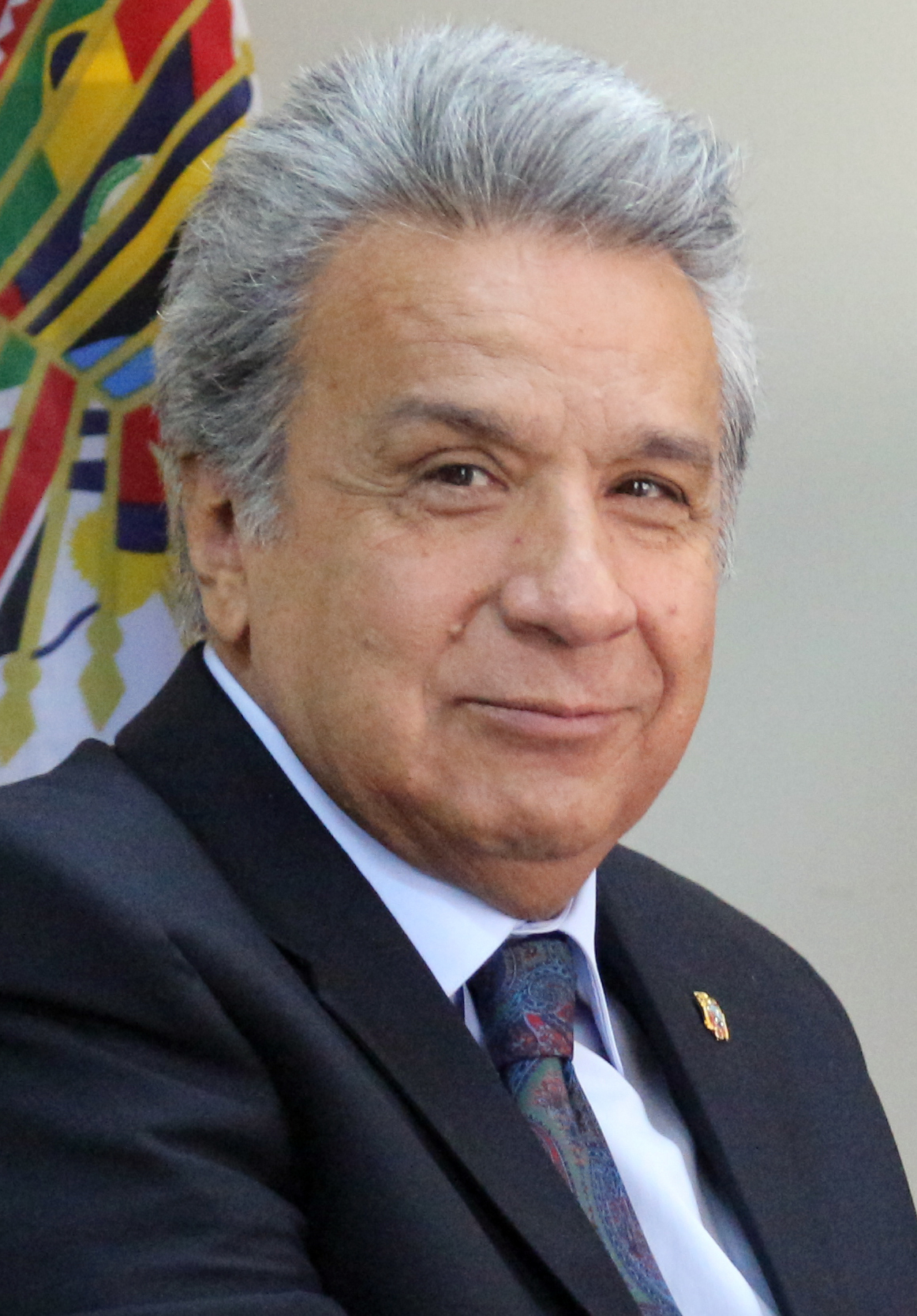
- Moreno in 2018

46th President of Ecuador
- In office 24 May 2017 – 24 May 2021
- Vice President: Jorge Glas (2017–2018); María Vicuña (2018); Otto Sonnenholzner (2018–2020); María Alejandra Muñoz (2020–2021)
- Preceded by: Rafael Correa
- Succeeded by: Guillermo Lasso

47th Vice President of Ecuador
- In office 15 January 2007 – 24 May 2013
- President: Rafael Correa
- Preceded by: Alejandro Serrano
- Succeeded by: Jorge Glas

Acting President of Ecuador
- In office 15 January 2013 – 14 February 2013
- Preceded by: Rafael Correa
- Succeeded by: Rafael Correa

President of the PAIS Alliance
- In office 1 May 2017 – 3 March 2021
- Preceded by: Rafael Correa
- Succeeded by: Patricio Barriga

United Nations Special Envoy on Disability and Accessibility
- In office 19 December 2013 – 30 September 2016
- Secretary General: Ban Ki-moon

Personal details
- Born: Lenín Voltaire Moreno Garcés; 19 March 1953 (age 73) Nuevo Rocafuerte, Ecuador
- Party: Independent (2021–present)
- Other political affiliations: PAIS Alliance (2006–2021)
- Spouse: Rocío González (m. 1974)
- Children: 3
- Education: Central University of Ecuador
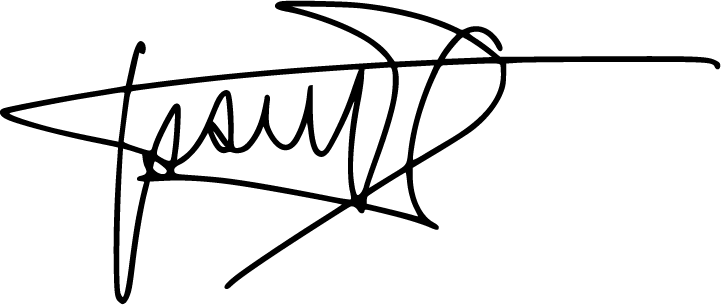
- Signature
- Website: twitter.com/lenin

Lenín Voltaire Moreno Garcés (Note: In this Spanish name, the first or paternal surname is Moreno and the second or maternal family name is Garcés.) (Spanish: [leˈnim bolˈtajɾe moˈɾeno ɣaɾˈses]; (Note: In isolation, Lenín is pronounced [leˈnin].) born 19 March 1953) is an Ecuadorian politician who was the 46th president of Ecuador from 2017 to 2021. He was also vice president from 2007 to 2013, under President Rafael Correa.

He was nominated as the candidate for Correa's PAIS Alliance, a social democratic political party, in the 2017 presidential election and won a narrow victory in Ecuador's second round of voting on 2 April 2017. However, after his election Moreno drastically shifted his political stance, distancing himself from Correa's leftist legacy in both domestic and foreign policy.

After completing a presidential term marked by corruption, violence, and the implementation of a series of neoliberal reforms in his country, Lenín Moreno became extremely unpopular among the Ecuadorian people. By the end of Moreno's presidency he had left office with an approval rating of 9%, the lowest in modern Ecuadorian history, due to his poor administration, lack of achievements, and continuous corruption scandals. He was expelled from PAIS Alliance in March 2021 after the party's crushing defeat in the 2021 elections.

In August 2026, he was sentenced to five years in prison for bribery by the National Court of Justice in the Sinohydro Case. The former president had received bribes to facilitate financing for the Coca Codo Sinclair hydroelectric project. The Court also ordered his “permanent disqualification from holding public office.” He is the first former president of Ecuador to be convicted of bribery.

Moreno was shot in a 1998 robbery attempt and thereafter has used a wheelchair. For his advocacy for people with disabilities, he was nominated for the 2012 Nobel Peace Prize. According to The New York Times, while he was in office from 2017 to 2021, Moreno was the world's only serving head of state to use a wheelchair.

== Early life and education ==
Lenín Moreno was born into a middle-class family in Nuevo Rocafuerte, a small town in the Ecuadorian Amazon, near the Peruvian border. His father, Servio Tulio Moreno, was a teacher who promoted bilingual education and integrated schools for indigenous children and mestizo children and who later became a senator. His parents named him after men they admired; his father liked Vladimir Lenin and his mother Voltaire, although an error in the civil registration turned his middle name into Boltaire (in Spanish the letters v and b correspond to the same phoneme). He moved to Quito with his family when he was three years old.

Moreno studied in Quito at the Instituto Nacional Mejía (Mejia National Institute), the Colegio Nacional Sebastián Benalcázar (Sebastian Benalcazar National School), and the Universidad Central del Ecuador (Central University of Ecuador), where he earned a degree in Public Administration and was honored as the best graduate. He studied psychology.

== Career ==
Moreno began his career in 1976 as the director of the Continental Professional Training Center. He went on to become Director of OMC Publigerencia Andina, sales manager of Satho and marketing manager of Zitro, all located in Ecuador. Then he moved to the public sector, taking an administrative post with the Minister of Government. He worked extensively in the public tourism industry. He founded the Chamber of Tourism of Pichincha, a province in Ecuador, and was executive director of the National Federation of Tourism Chambers and executive director of the Chamber of Tourism of Pichincha, between 1997 and 1999.

Moreno was appointed Special Envoy on Disability and Accessibility by United Nations Secretary-General Ban Ki-moon in December 2013.

== Vice-presidency (2007–2013) ==
Moreno boosted disabled services budget, aiding Ecuadorians with housing and income. Moreno implementing a 4% employment quota. He founded the Manuela Espejo Solidarity Mission, aiding and expanding beyond Ecuador. The mission involved Ecuadorean and Cuban doctors visiting homes, offering free medical checkups. Completing his term in 2013, Moreno was the first VP to do so since 1992.

Moreno left the vice presidency on 24 May 2013 and was succeeded by Jorge Glas.

== Presidency (2017–2021) ==
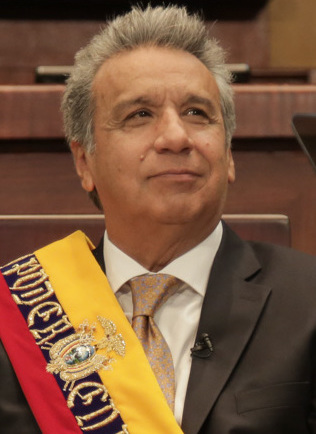
- Lenín Moreno; 24 May 2017 – 24 May 2021
- Vice President: Jorge Glas (2017–2018 (Note: Glas was suspended from powers and duties on 3 August 2017 until his removal from office. Powers and duties were transferred to María Vicuña.)); María Vicuña (2018); Otto Sonnenholzner (2018–2020); María Alejandra Muñoz (2020–2021)
- Election: 2017
- Seat: Carondelet Palace

On 1 October 2016, Moreno was nominated as a candidate for the 2017 presidential election at the conference of Alianza País. The statement of his candidacy was made by President Rafael Correa.

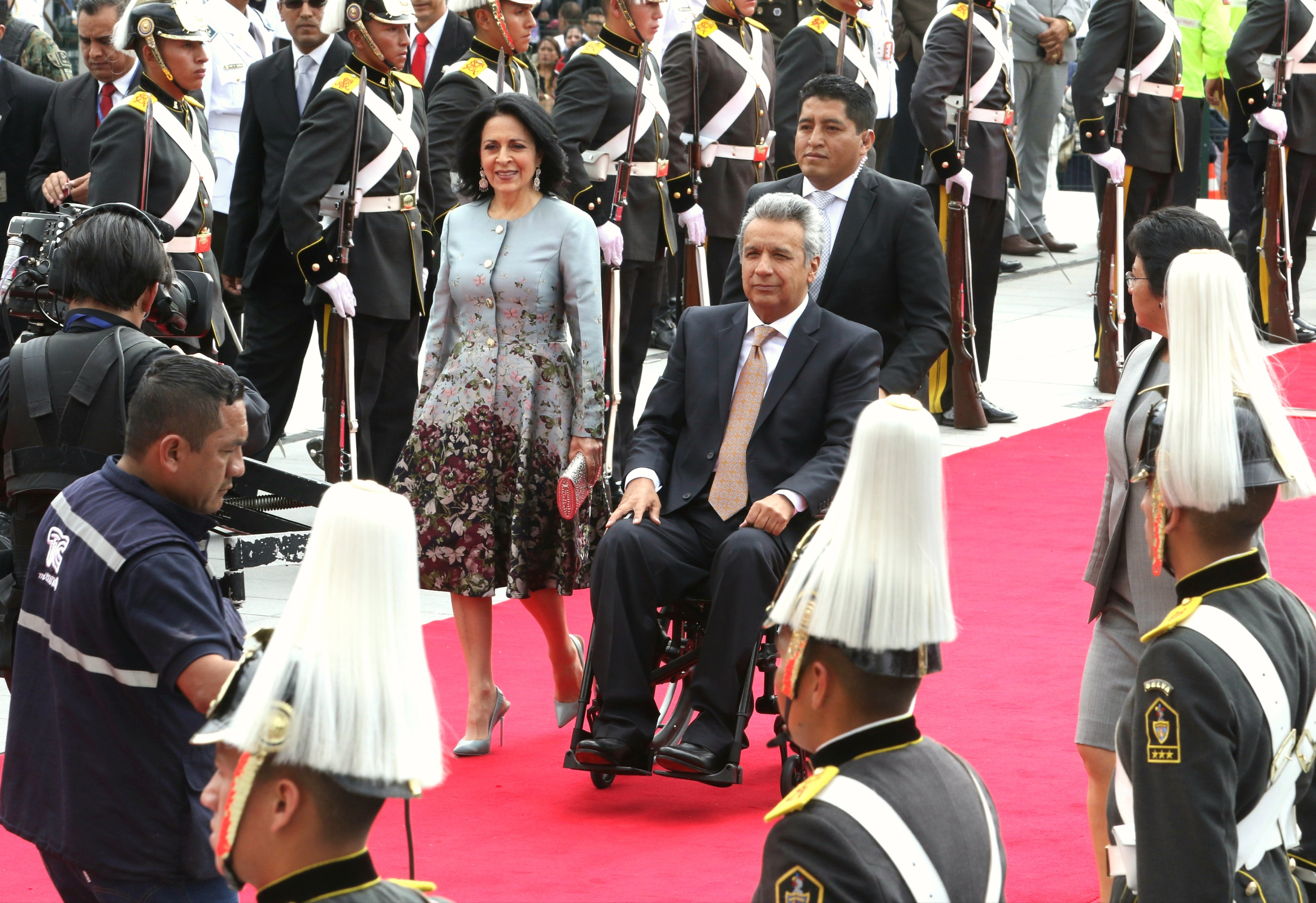
Moreno and Rocío González on the way to the presidential inauguration

On 19 February 2017 election, Moreno won the elections with 39.3% of the vote. However he was short by less than one percentage point of outright victory, as Ecuador requires in its two-round system. On 2 April 2017 runoff, he defeated Guillermo Lasso, with 51.16% of the vote.

=== Presidency ===
Within months of winning the election, Moreno started moving away from his election platform, thus igniting a feud with ex-president Rafael Correa. Later in 2018, through a referendum, Moreno reversed several key pieces of legislation passed by the Correa administration that targeted wealthy individuals and banks. He also reversed a previous referendum allowing indefinite re-election, and established the Consejo de Participación Ciudadana y Control Social Transitorio (CPCCS-T), which has supra-constitutional powers, to "evaluate control authorities and judges", with the aim of removing what remains of Correa's influence.

Since the creation of CPCCS-T, Moreno has used it to oust and replace government officials, provincial judges, the judicial council, and the National Electoral Council (CNE).

Moreno's government adopted a conservative policy: reduction of public spending, trade liberalization, and flexibility of the labour code. The Productive Development Act enshrines an austerity policy, and reduces the development and redistribution policies of the previous mandate. In the area of taxes, the authorities aim to "encourage the return of investors" by granting tax amnesty and proposing measures to reduce tax rates for large companies. In addition, the government waives the right to tax increases in raw material prices and foreign exchange repatriations.

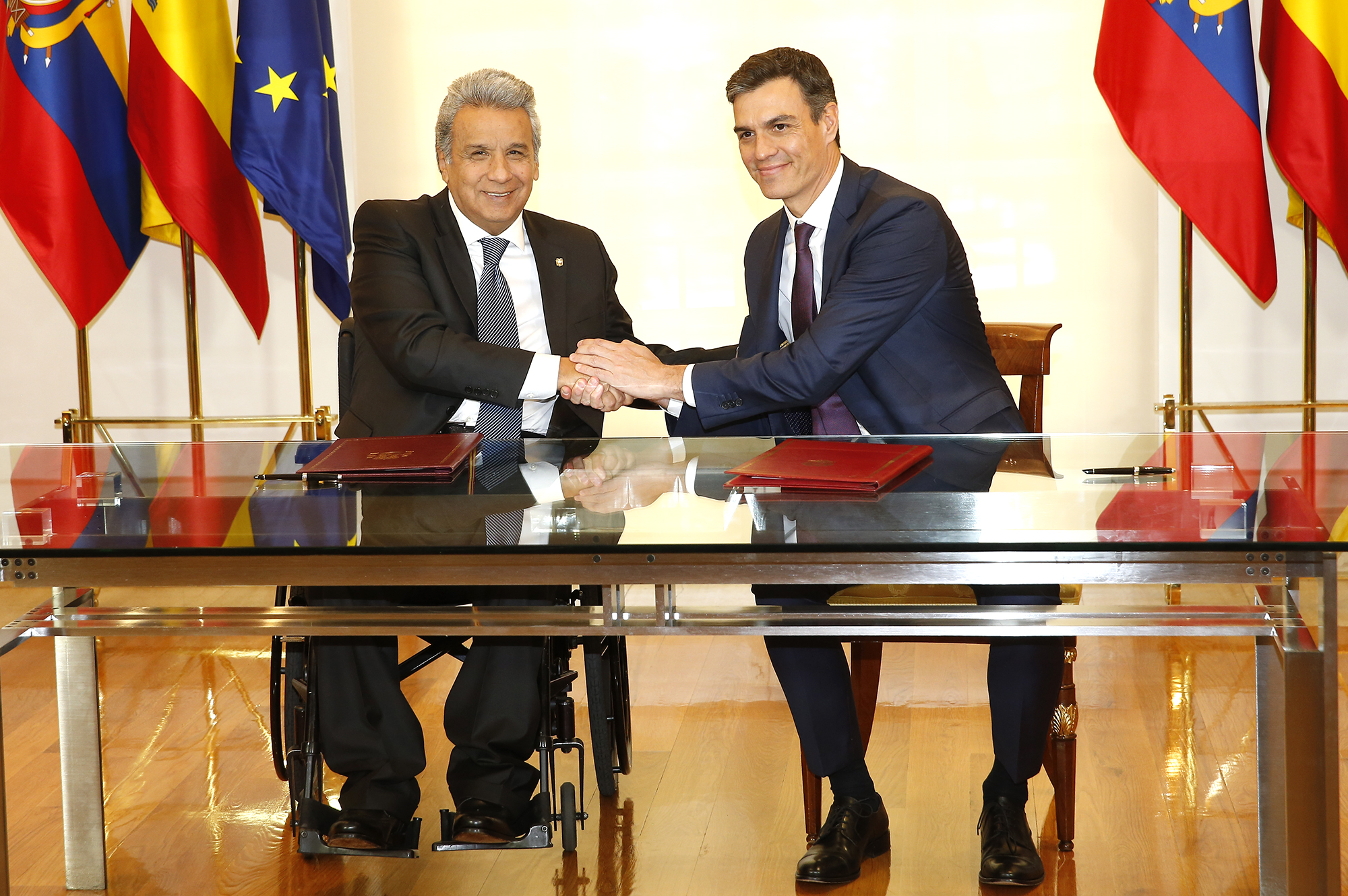
Moreno with Spanish Prime Minister Pedro Sánchez, 26 July 2018.

Moreno's government supported plans for oil drilling in Ecuador's Amazon region.

The Ecuadorian state limits annual public expenditure increases to 3%, confines budget deficits to debt interest repayment, and promotes privatizations with extended subsidies. Additionally, the government adopts international arbitration for foreign investments.

Moreno announced in February 2019 that he had obtained a loan of more than $10 billion from the International Monetary Fund (IMF) and the World Bank, with which the previous government had broken off, "at rates below 5% on average and for terms of up to 30 years".

In June 2019, Moreno's government faced protests from environmentalist, indigenous and self-described patriotic groups after he permitted the US military to use the airbase on Galápagos Islands.

He faced more protests in September 2019, as pro-choice demonstrators protested the fact that Ecuador had failed to pass proposed legislation, which would have relaxed the nation's strict abortion laws to allow for abortion in the case of rape.

On 2 October 2019, Moreno declared the abolition of fuel subsidies, which in turn triggered the 2019 Ecuadorian protests. The government was forced to move from Quito to Guayaquil after effectively losing control of the capital to demonstrators. Seven people were killed and 2,100 were arrested before Moreno signed directive 883, restoring the subsidies, which ended the protests on 13 October.

Moreno has been criticized for inappropriate jokes, and gaffes about child labor and sex.

==== Actions taken during the COVID-19 pandemic ====
When the World Health Organization (WHO) declared the global pandemic of COVID-19 on 11 March 2020, the Ecuadorian government declared a health emergency throughout the country. Preventive measures included home isolation for travelers arriving from countries with a higher number of reported cases, increased control measures, restrictions on mass events, strengthening of biosafety measures for healthcare personnel, the use of technological platforms for telemedicine, online education, and telecommuting, and a prohibition on the export of masks, soaps, and disinfectant gels. Subsequently, on 16 March, a state of emergency was decreed with the purpose of containing the transmission of the coronavirus (COVID-19), a situation that persisted until September.

==== Health crisis during the COVID-19 pandemic ====
The health system crisis in Ecuador during the coronavirus pandemic worsened due to a lack of investment in hospital infrastructure and a reduction in public health spending in previous years. In 2019, 10,000 public sector professionals were laid off, with the majority being healthcare workers, as part of austerity measures imposed by Moreno and recommended by the International Monetary Fund. The lack of adequate equipment, including the inoperability of key medical equipment, hindered the response capacity to the pandemic. These deficiencies in the health system left the population vulnerable, leading to a critical situation where the deceased accumulated in the streets, highlighting the magnitude of the crisis in Ecuador.

Ecuador's health system was extremely overtaxed during the COVID-19 pandemic. The province of Guayas, with Guayaquil as the most affected city, recorded 1,937 cases, representing 70% of the national total of 2,748 cases. The BBC reported that Guayaquil had more COVID-19 deaths than entire countries. Additionally, the number of deaths in the country reached 927.000. The health system proved insufficient to cope with the growing demand, leading to a situation where the bodies of the deceased were left in the streets due to the system's lack of response and capacity.

Video footage of corpses in Guayaquil's streets reflected the critical situation the city was facing. Many funeral homes ceased operations out of fear of contracting the virus, causing delays in the removal of bodies. It was estimated that some of these deaths were not related to the coronavirus, but due to the lack of medical analysis, the causes of death could not be confirmed. The scarcity of resources in low-income neighborhoods led to wakes being held at home, and many families had to wait for more than three days for the bodies to be removed.

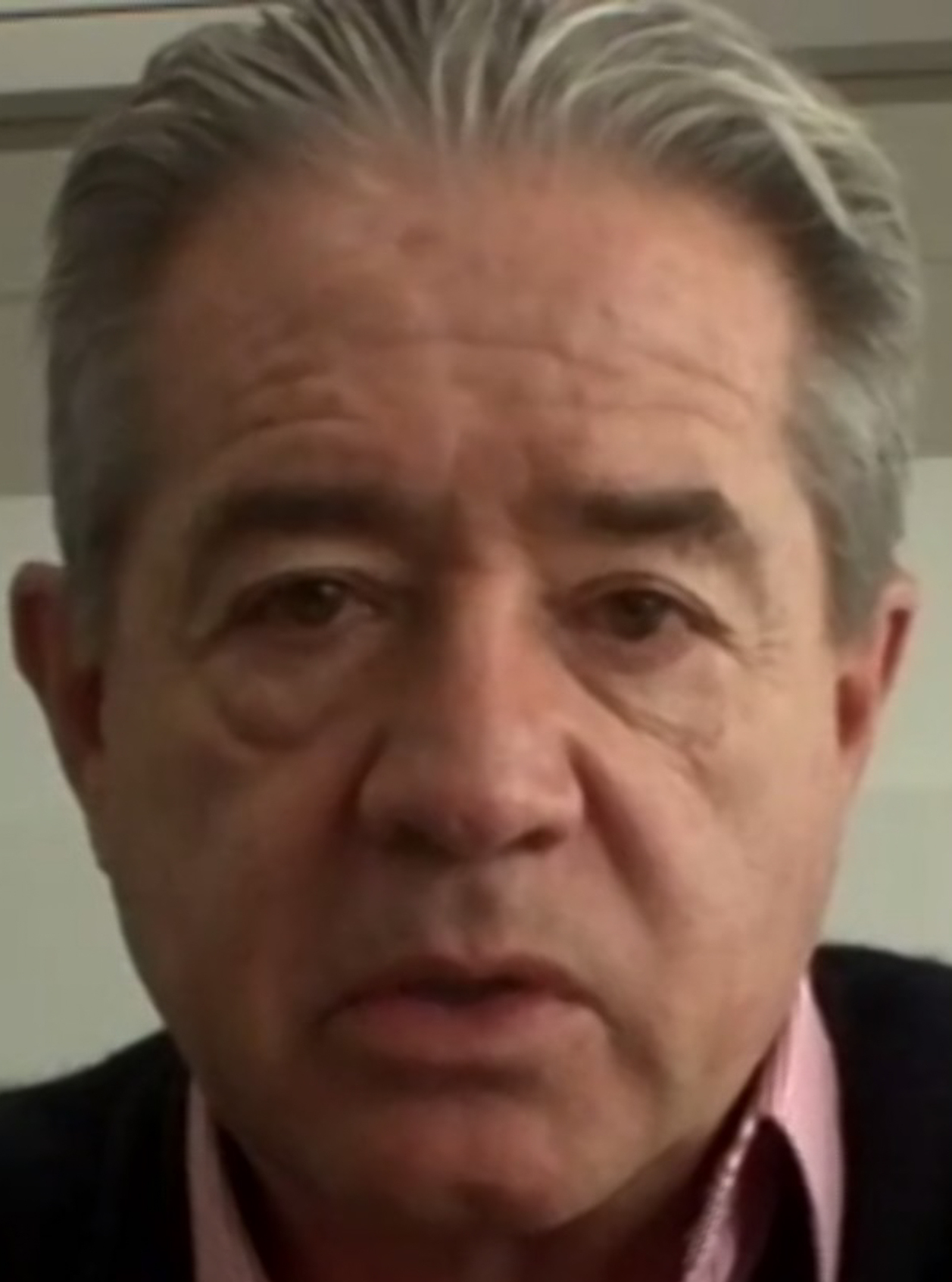
Juan Carlos Zevallos before escaping from Ecuadorian justice

===== Nepotism and irregular management of COVID-19 vaccines =====
Health Minister Juan Carlos Zevallos stirred controversy by prioritizing the vaccination of his relatives against COVID-19 instead of focusing on priority groups. This occurred while Ecuador was facing a severe national emergency with thousands of deaths due to the pandemic, and corpses were piling up in the streets of Guayaquil. It was discovered that doses intended for COVID-19 patients were diverted to vaccinate Zevallos' family members at private centers. Despite the complaints and calls for his resignation, Zevallos received strong support from Moreno. However, due to pressure from the National Assembly, he ultimately resigned from his position.

The Attorney General's Office requested precautionary measures to prevent Zevallos from leaving the country. Despite these measures, it was revealed that Zevallos had allegedly escaped to Miami.

=== Security measures ===
Since Moreno assumed the presidency, Ecuador has experienced a significant increase in insecurity, as the homicide rate has risen from 5.6 per 100,000 inhabitants in 2017 to 20 per 100,000 in 2022. According to security expert Fernando Carrión, this situation results from decisions made by Moreno's government: "The Ministry of Justice, which managed prisons, was eliminated, as well as the coordinating Ministry of Security, the Ministry of the Interior responsible for security, and the National Council for the Control of Narcotic and Psychotropic Substances. All of this was consolidated into a single ministry called the Ministry of Governance, and budgetary resources were substantially reduced." Due to these measures, Ecuador went from being the second safest country in the region to one of the most violent and dangerous in Latin America. In 2023, Paco Moncayo, the then Minister of Security under President Guillermo Lasso, stated, "Moreno dismantled the country's security system."

Following Moreno's budget cuts, one of the bloodiest prison uprisings in Ecuador's history occurred in 2021.

=== Penitentiary crisis ===
The inmate uprising in Ecuador, which left at least 116 dead, worsened the penitentiary crisis in the country. Three massacres were recorded in prisons during that period, resulting in a total of nearly 240 fatalities. Ecuador had 65 prisons with an official capacity of 30,000 people, but the prison population exceeded these figures, reaching around 39,000 individuals, of which nearly a sixth of the inmates in Ecuador’s prisons have not been sentenced. There was a shortage of internal guards, with only 1,500 across the entire country and an additional need for 3,000 according to experts. The major penitentiaries were located in Latacunga, Cuenca, and Guayaquil, with the latter hosting a large prison complex housing one-third of the country's inmates. The penitentiary crisis was compounded by violence generated by gangs linked to international drug trafficking, primarily from Mexico and Colombia, competing for power both inside and outside the prisons. These gangs operated from within the prisons as "central criminal commands." Approximately one-third of the inmates had ties to drug trafficking. Simultaneous uprisings occurred in four prisons in February, resulting in 79 dead inmates. Authorities attempted to regain control of the prisons with the assistance of the military.

=== Allegations of corruption ===
Ina Papers Case. This involves a corruption scandal in which bribery or "kickbacks" and money laundering amounting to 76 million dollars were allegedly managed, involving Moreno and his family in relation to an offshore company named Ina Investment Corporation. According to the investigation, this company was founded by Moreno's brother, Edwin Moreno, in Belize, a tax haven known for its tax benefits for foreign companies.

According to information published on inapapers.org, the name "Ina" was used as it was the last three letters of the names of Moreno's daughters: Karina, Cristina, and Irina. Additionally, the investigation has linked Xavier Macías Carmigniani and María Auxiliadora Patiño, close friends of Moreno and his wife Rocío González, to the offshore company.

It has been discovered that Ina Investment Corporation carried out various transactions, such as the purchase of furniture in Switzerland and the acquisition of an apartment in Spain.

In April 2023, prosecutors requested preventive detention for Lenín and Irina Moreno, Rocío González, and seven other individuals involved in the case.

=== Mueller investigation ===
US Special Counsel Robert Mueller's team had been investigating a meeting between former Donald Trump campaign chairman Paul Manafort and President Moreno in Quito in 2017. Moreno talked with Manafort about removing WikiLeaks founder Julian Assange from the Ecuadorian Embassy in London and his extradition to the United States.

=== Foreign policies ===
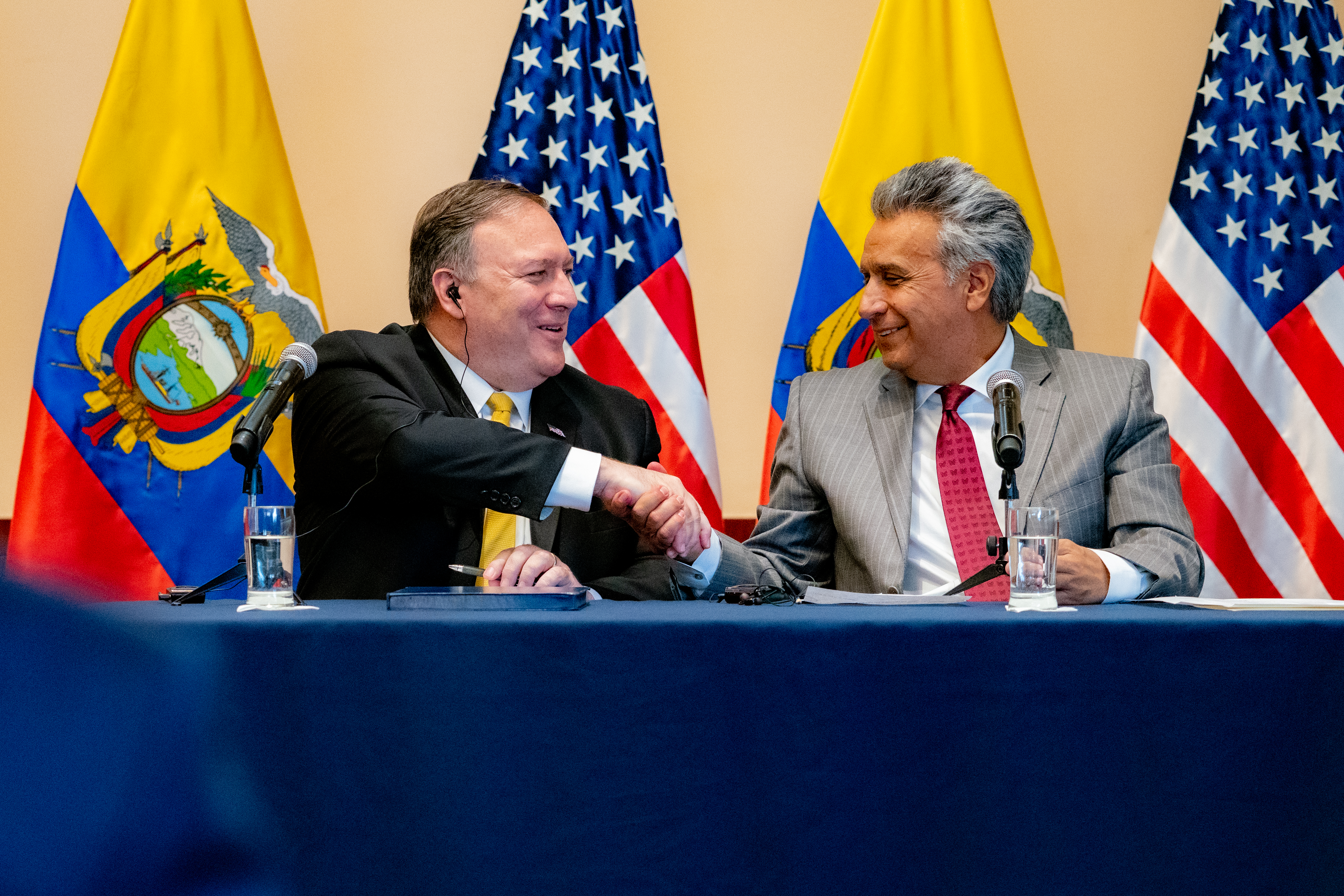
Moreno with U.S. Secretary of State Mike Pompeo, 20 July 2019

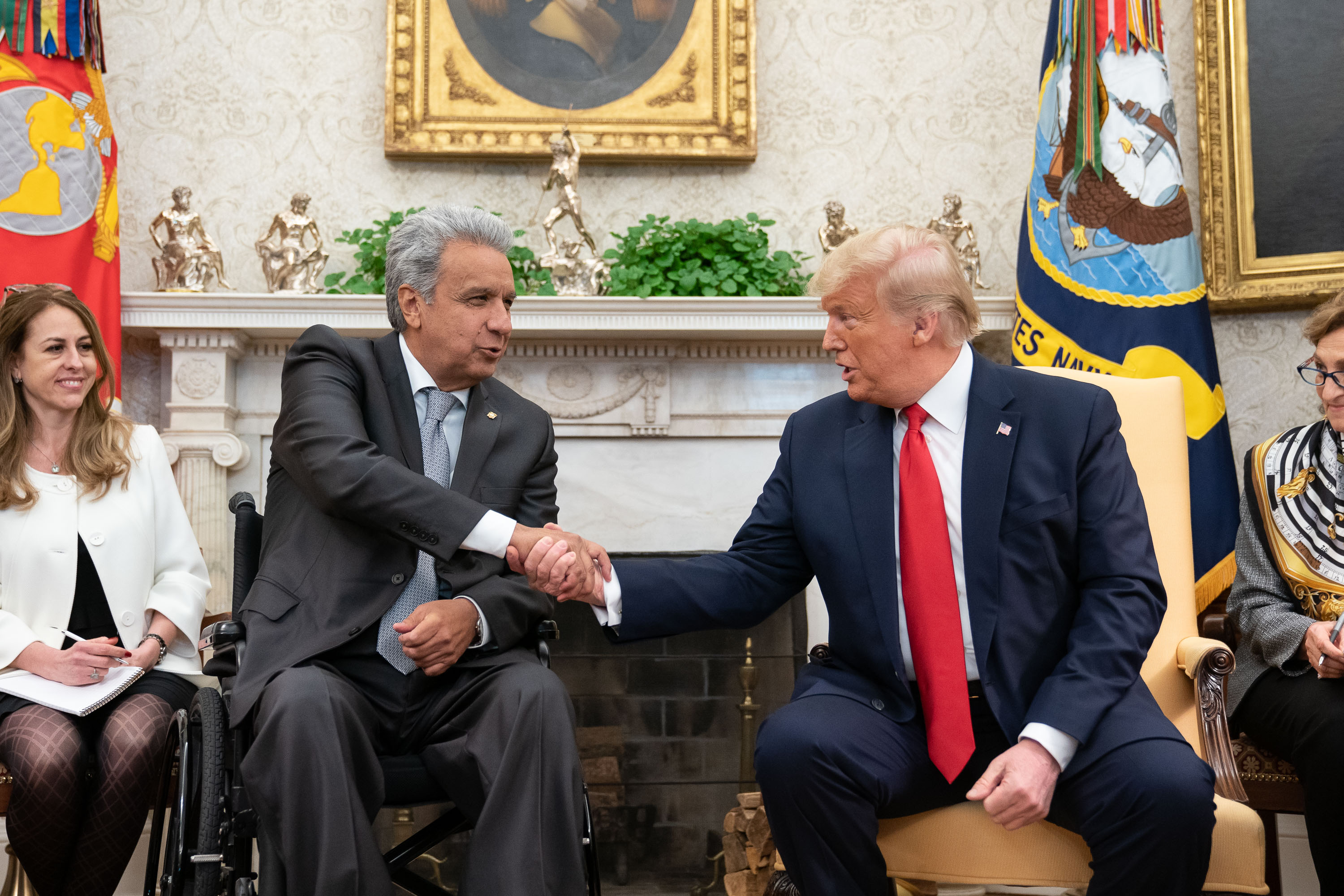
Moreno with U.S. President Donald Trump in February 2020

Following a June 2018 visit by U.S. Vice President Mike Pence, who agreed with President Moreno to improve the US-Ecuador relations which were strained under the presidency of Rafael Correa, Ecuador launched a security effort with the United States, including buying weapons, radar sets, six helicopters and other equipment, as well as cooperation with the U.S. that would include training and intelligence sharing. Pence and Moreno also spoke about Julian Assange.

In August 2018, Ecuador withdrew from ALBA, a regional bloc led by Venezuela and Cuba, in a bid to further distance itself from that country's socialist state and to be more "independent" of organizations that are trying to impose "specific views" on Latin America's social and political issues.

In January 2019, Moreno supported Venezuelan opposition leader Juan Guaidó's claim to the Presidency of Venezuela, thus moving Ecuador away from its previous support of Nicolás Maduro.

In early-2019 the IMF approved a $4.2bn loan for Ecuador. In April 2019 the World Bank approved the Social Safety Net Project for Ecuador.

After imposing new restrictions on Julian Assange, who had been given political asylum in Ecuador's London embassy since 2012, on 11 April 2019, Ecuador revoked his asylum, with Moreno saying Ecuador had "reached its limit on the behaviour of Mr Assange", allowing the Metropolitan Police to arrest him in the embassy.

By mid-2019, he moved Ecuador's diplomatic position closer to the United States as he allowed the United States to use a military airstrip on the Galápagos Islands to monitor drug trafficking and illegal fishing.

==== Shipment of weapons to Bolivia in support of the 2019 coup ====
During the coup d'état that took place in Bolivia in 2019, led by Jeanine Áñez, a shipment of weapons and war ammunition from Ecuador was introduced into Bolivia. This led to an inspection to determine the route of said shipment. According to the commander of the Bolivian Police, Colonel Jhonny Aguilera, statements from authorities in 2019 have been collected, confirming the undertaking of a trip on that date to introduce weaponry. Additionally, it was revealed that the military attaché of Bolivia in Ecuador at that time was responsible for managing the shipment on a C-130 aircraft. Authorities hope to determine the quantity of weaponry and tear gas that arrived in the country, as well as the intended purpose for their use. It is detailed that Ecuador delivered 5,000 hand grenades GL-302, 500 sound and flash grenades for outdoor use, 2,389 long-range projectiles caliber 37 mm, and 560 short-range projectiles caliber 37mm.

=== Approval rating ===
Moreno maintained a majority approval rating throughout his term as vice president. In late March 2012, his management was approved by 91% of Ecuadorians. Moreno enjoyed a popularity rating as high as 77% shortly after his election in 2017. His approval dropped slightly to around 69% by the start of 2018, before dropping to 46% by mid-2018 and further fell to under 27% by mid-2019, in May 2020, it registered 16% approval. After the 2019 Ecuadorian protests and mismanagement of the COVID-19 pandemic, Moreno reached an all-time low popularity, reaching only 5% of approval by early 2021. Moreno left office with an acceptance rate of only 9%, according to a survey by the firm Cedatos. As a result of his sharp shift to the right as president, Moreno has a higher approval rating among those who voted for Guillermo Lasso (20%) than those who voted for Moreno himself (5%), although he is now disapproved of by both groups.

=== Purchase of fake followers on social media ===
Moreno's low popularity ratings led to him buying followers on social media to appear to have popular support, according to an investigation by The New York Times. It was reported that the Ecuadorian president would have been a client of the company Devumi, which had provided him with at least 55,000 fake accounts on the social media platform Twitter. This company offered followers and retweets in support of Moreno and his administration.

== Post-presidency ==
Moreno did not run again for re-election in the 2021 Ecuadorian general election. On 4 March 2021 he was expelled from PAIS Alliance.

On 22 February 2023, Ecuador's attorney general Diana Salazar asked for charges to be brought against Moreno and 36 others over alleged corruption over the construction of one of the country's largest hydroelectric plants, built between 2009 and 2018. Moreno denied any accusations and said that Salazar's decision was a distraction from national issues. On 6 March 2023, a judge approved bribery charges to be brought against Moreno over the hydroelectric plant construction between 2009 and 2018. Moreno, who resides in Paraguay, denied the charges and called them "inhumane and arbitrary."

=== Accusations of robbery ===
Moreno was accused of robbery and investigated for missing pieces from the Presidential Museum. According to National Assembly members, when Moreno left office, only 7,000 pieces out of the original 11,200 remained in the museum located in the government palace. Assemblywoman Pamela Aguirre Zambonino urged the attorney general to investigate the case and not let the accusations be forgotten. The estimated value of the missing museum pieces exceeds 2 million dollars and included objects received as gifts from foreign leaders to Ecuador, as well as other historical items from the country.

=== Commissioner of the OAS (2022–present) ===
At the end of his term, Moreno left Ecuador to reside in the United States with his daughter Irina, who was already living in the country, serving as the Ecuadorian representative to the United Nations. In North America, Moreno became a speaker at the Adam Smith Center for Economic Freedom at Florida International University (FIU). Later, he was appointed by the President of the Organization of American States, Luis Almagro, to serve as Commissioner of this organization in the city of Asunción, Paraguay, where he began to reside upon taking office as OAS Commissioner.

== Notes ==
Political offices
Preceded by Alejandro Serrano	Vice President of Ecuador; 2007–2013	Succeeded by Jorge Glas
Preceded by Rafael Correa	President of Ecuador; 2017–2021	Succeeded by Guillermo Lasso
Party political offices
Preceded by Rafael Correa	President of the PAIS Alliance; 2017–2021	Vacant
Diplomatic posts
Preceded by Position established	United Nations Special Envoy on Disability and Accessibility; 2013–2016	Succeeded by María Soledad Cisternas Reyes
