= Leonidas Iza =

Ecuadorian activist and indigenous leader

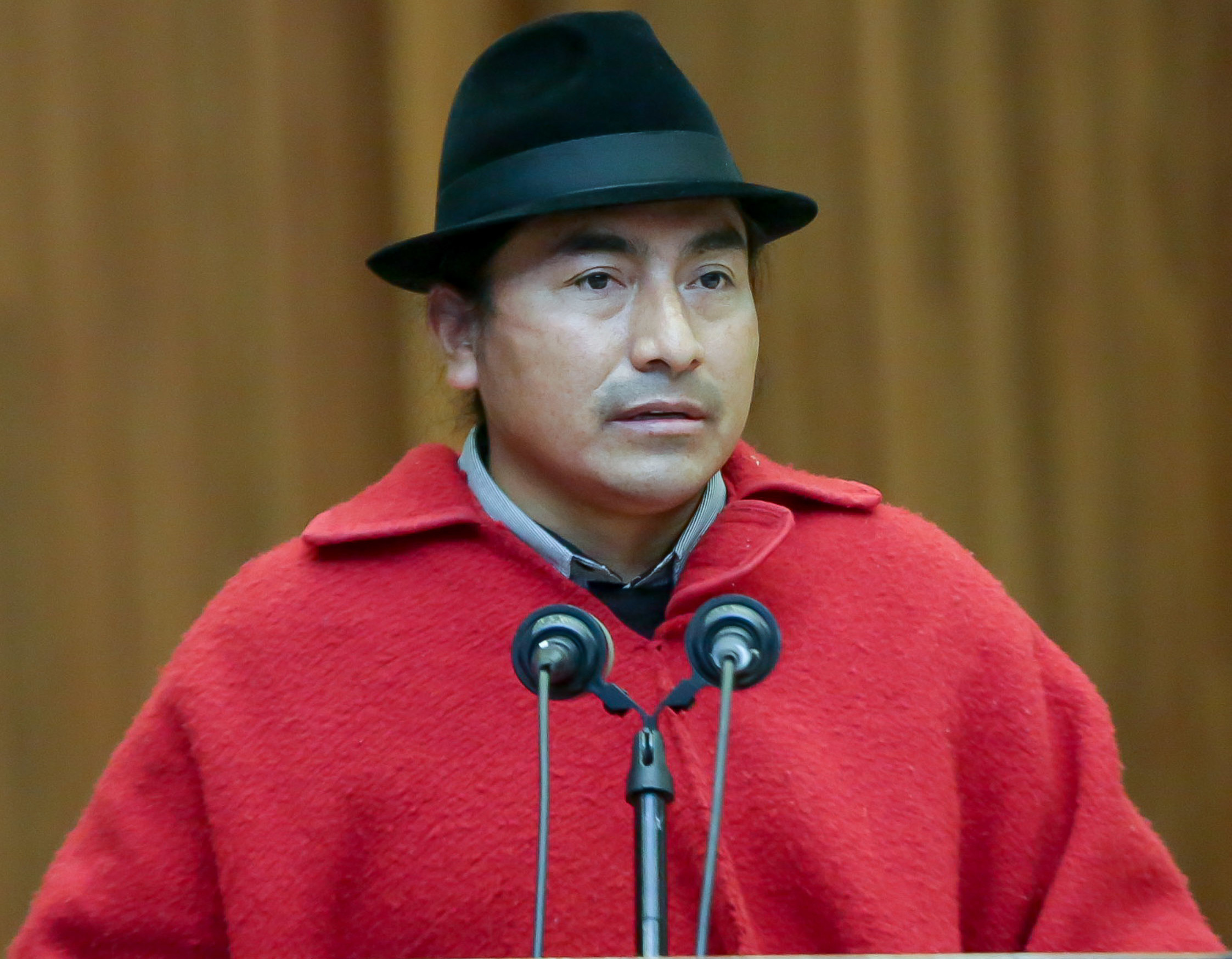
- Born: 1982 (age 43–44)
- Title: President of the Confederation of Indigenous Nationalities of Ecuador

Segundo Leonidas Iza Salazar (born c. 1982) is an Ecuadorian activist and indigenous leader of Kichwa-Panzaleo ancestry who is serving as the president of the Confederation of Indigenous Nationalities of Ecuador (CONAIE) since June 27, 2021. Alongside Jaime Vargas, Iza led the demonstrations held in Ecuador in October 2019 by the CONAIE against the economic measures taken by the then-government of Lenín Moreno. He ran for President of Ecuador in the 2025 general election.

== Biography ==
He was born to José María Iza Viracocha and Rosa Elvira Salazar; the former was a historical indigenous leader. Additionally, he is the cousin of Leonidas Iza Quinatoa, a former congressman and participant in the first indigenous uprising. He studied Environmental Engineering at the Technical University of Cotopaxi. He also claims to have read writings of leftist thinkers, highlighting, among those that have influenced his thinking, Eduardo Galeano's essay entitled The Open Veins of Latin America and the work of José Carlos Mariátegui.

His activity in the indigenous movement as a catechist began at the age of fifteen after reading Galeano's work. He later became president of the community of San Ignacio de Toacaso in Latacunga Canton in 2010, ultimately becoming a member and later leader of the Youth Commission 2013, and of the Provincial Committee of Pachakutik. In 2012, he noted his party's opposition to the 2013 Ecuador presidential election of Auki Tituaña as Guillermo Lasso's running mate.

During the Congress of the Indigenous and Peasant Movement of Cotopaxi (MICC), which was held between September 30 – October 1, 2016, he was elected president of the organization. Representing the Union of Peasant Organizations of North Cotopaxi (Unocan) and with the support of twenty-two other organizations, he managed to beat Manuel Vega (75 votes) and Gerardo Saca (18 votes) by securing a total of 102 votes.

== Presidency of the CONAIE ==
Leonidas Iza is the new president of the Confederation of Indigenous Nationalities of Ecuador (CONAIE). Iza represented the Indigenous and Peasant Movement of Cotopaxi (MICC) and managed to capture votes from some of the delegates from the Coast, the Amazon, and the Highlands. His nomination was confirmed on Sunday, June 27, 2021, on the last day of the VII National Congress of the CONAIE, which was held in the town of Salasaca, in the Province of Tungurahua, Ecuador. Iza achieved 821 votes; María Andrade, 287; and Marco Guatemal, 153.

During the 2022 Ecuadorian protests, initially launched due to rising fuel prices and continued discrimination against the indigenous population, he was arrested by police on June 14 in the Pastocalle Sector, Cotopaxi.

In July 2022 talks broke down between the executive and Iza after the President said that talks were off. The President had meetings with Iza and others with mediation from church leaders – despite an attack on a military convoy in Orellana province. Diana Atamaint (as president of the National Electoral Council), the National Assembly President Virgilio Saquicela and César Córdova of the CPCCS all called on the President for calm and to continue talks.

== 2025 presidential campaign ==
In February 2024, Iza registered as a pre-candidate for the Pachakutik presidential nomination in the 2025 general election. He placed third in the first round, receiving 5.25% of the vote.
