= Cecilia Velasque =

Ecuadorian politician

Cecilia Velasque is an Ecuadorian politician who is the deputy co-ordinator at the Pachakutik Plurinational Unity Movement.

== Life ==
In March 2022 the Pachakutik Plurinational Unity Movement had 25 of its members at the National Assembly. They tow the party line and Velasque revealed that this was an objective. She explained that each of the members know that they would be jettisoned if they decide to take an independent view. Yaku Pérez, who was an important ally left the party to take an independent line. Velasque noted that they could not prevent this. One ex-ally, Jaime Vargas, was separated from the party because he did not tow the party line.

In May 2023 she herself protested at her treatment by the leader of her party, Leonidas Iza.

She sees climate as an important issue. Ecuador has generally prioritised the economy over the environment.
