= 2015 Ecuadorian protests =

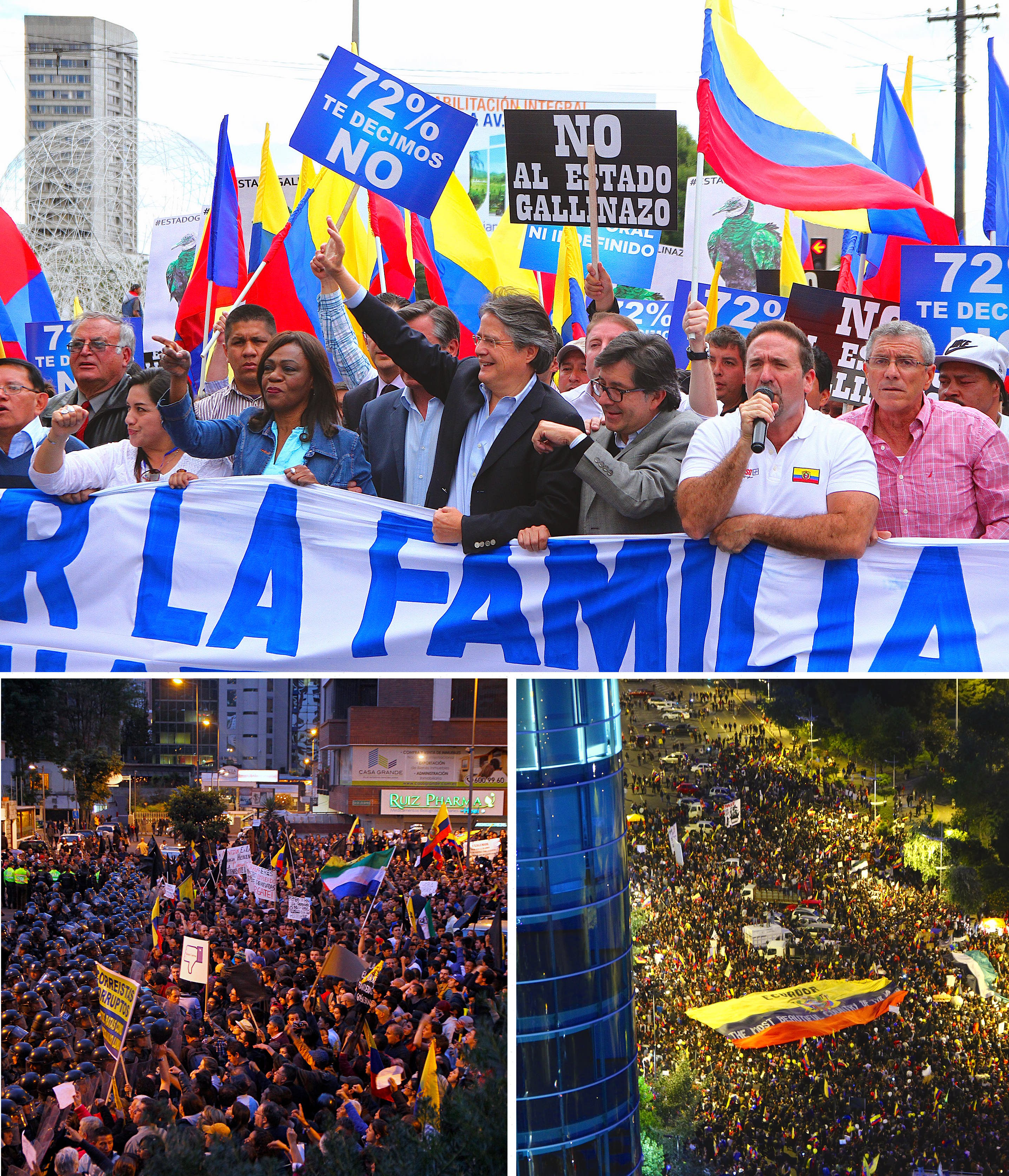
- Clockwise from top: Guillermo Lasso leading protesters in Quito on 24 June. Protests on Shirys Avenue in Quito on 25 June. Protesters and pro-government demonstrators separated by police in Quito on 10 June.
- Date: 8 June 2015 – 16 September 2015
- Location: Ecuador

Parties
Correa opponents: Creating Opportunities; Frente Unitario de los Trabajadores; Confederación de Nacionalidades Indígenas del Ecuador	Government of Ecuador: Alianza País

Lead figures
Creating Opportunities: Guillermo Lasso; Social Christian Party: Jaime Nebot; Frente Unitario de los Trabajadores: Pablo Serrano; Confederación de Nacionalidades Indígenas del Ecuador: Jorge Herrera	Government of Ecuador: Rafael Correa

Number
Hundreds of thousands: 400,000 protesters (25 June)	

The 2015 Ecuadorian protests were a series of protests against the government of President Rafael Correa. Protests began in the first week of June, triggered by legislation increasing inheritance and capital gains taxes. By August, an alliance of rural farmworkers, Indigenous federations such as CONAIE, student groups, and labor unions had organised protests involving hundreds of thousands of people with a wide range of grievances, including the controversial tax laws; constitutional amendments removing presidential term limits; expanding oil and mining projects; water, education, and labour policies; a proposed free trade agreement with the European Union; and increasing repression of freedom of speech. On August 15, the government declared a state of exception that allowed the military to crackdown on protests.

Protestors blocked roads and declared a general strike in August. Violence and human rights violations were reported in clashes between militarised police and protestors.

Protestors stated that Correa wanted to follow "the same path as Venezuela's government," creating a "criminal war of classes," while President Correa stated that the protests were aimed at destabilizing the government, and the proposed measures were for combatting inequality.

== Background ==
Throughout his presidency, Correa has been a controversial figure. Correa describes himself as an advocate of "socialism of the 21st century", though he has also been described as "a left-wing populist". Political science scholars George Philip and Francisco Panizza also claimed that like his allies Morales and Chávez, Correa should be categorized as a populist, because he appealed "directly to the people against their countries' political and economic order, divided the social field into antagonistic camps and promised redistribution and recognition in a newly founded political order."

The Washington Post characterized Correa's ideological approach as having contradictions however, and compared him to other pink tide presidents such as Bolivia's Evo Morales and Venezuela's Hugo Chávez. Though Correa, an economist, did not attack Ecuador's private sector like Chávez and Ecuador's socioeconomic environment flourished with decreased poverty, he did follow Chávez's example of filling the Supreme Court of Ecuador with his allies and attempted to silence critics. Such actions have resulted in Correa being accused of authoritarianism, nepotism, attacking dissidents and curtailing freedom of speech.

Though Correa had brought stability to the poor who supported him, he combatted with other social groups such as the media, the Catholic Church, bankers and indigenous groups, saying that those who protested against him were part of "a wealthy oligarchy", a similar approach to what his ally Nicolás Maduro did to those who opposed him.

=== Economic policies ===
Following years of heavy revenues from high oil prices that Correa experienced during his eight years as president, Ecuador experienced a 50% reduction in oil revenues. The government then cut its 2015 fiscal budget by 4% and initiated controversial economic measures that affected most Ecuadorians; both the middle class and the poor. In March 2015 when constitutional changes were proposed to allow the re-election of the president and government officials indefinitely while other labor and land ownership rules were submitted, protests numbered in thousands occurred in Quito that were organized by indigenous communities, unions and students. In June 2015, when the government proposed bills to tax inheritances up to 77.5% and a 75% tax on real estate capital gains to counter loss in oil revenue, protests in Ecuador became widespread, with protesters demanding Correa out and compared actions by the government to that of the Venezuelan government. According to economists, the proposed policies would damage Ecuador's economy and population since 95% of businesses are family owned.

== Timeline of events ==
Protests began on 8 June 2015 and continued after President Correa temporarily withdrew the proposed tax bills on 15 June, The protests expanded in July through September to include a broader range of issues including constitutional amendments removing presidential term limits; expanding oil and mining projects; water, education, and labour policies; a proposed free trade agreement with the European Union; and increasing repression of freedom of speech.

=== June ===
Near the headquarters of Correa's party, Alianza País, about 1,000 people gathered on June 8, including opposition, pro-government demonstrators, and 100 police on standby. On June 10, thousands of protesters wearing black in "mourning" demonstrated in the capital city of Quito for the second time in a week. Government supporters confronted the protesters leading their own chants under an Alianza País banner. In other parts of the city, opposition and pro-government groups clashed.

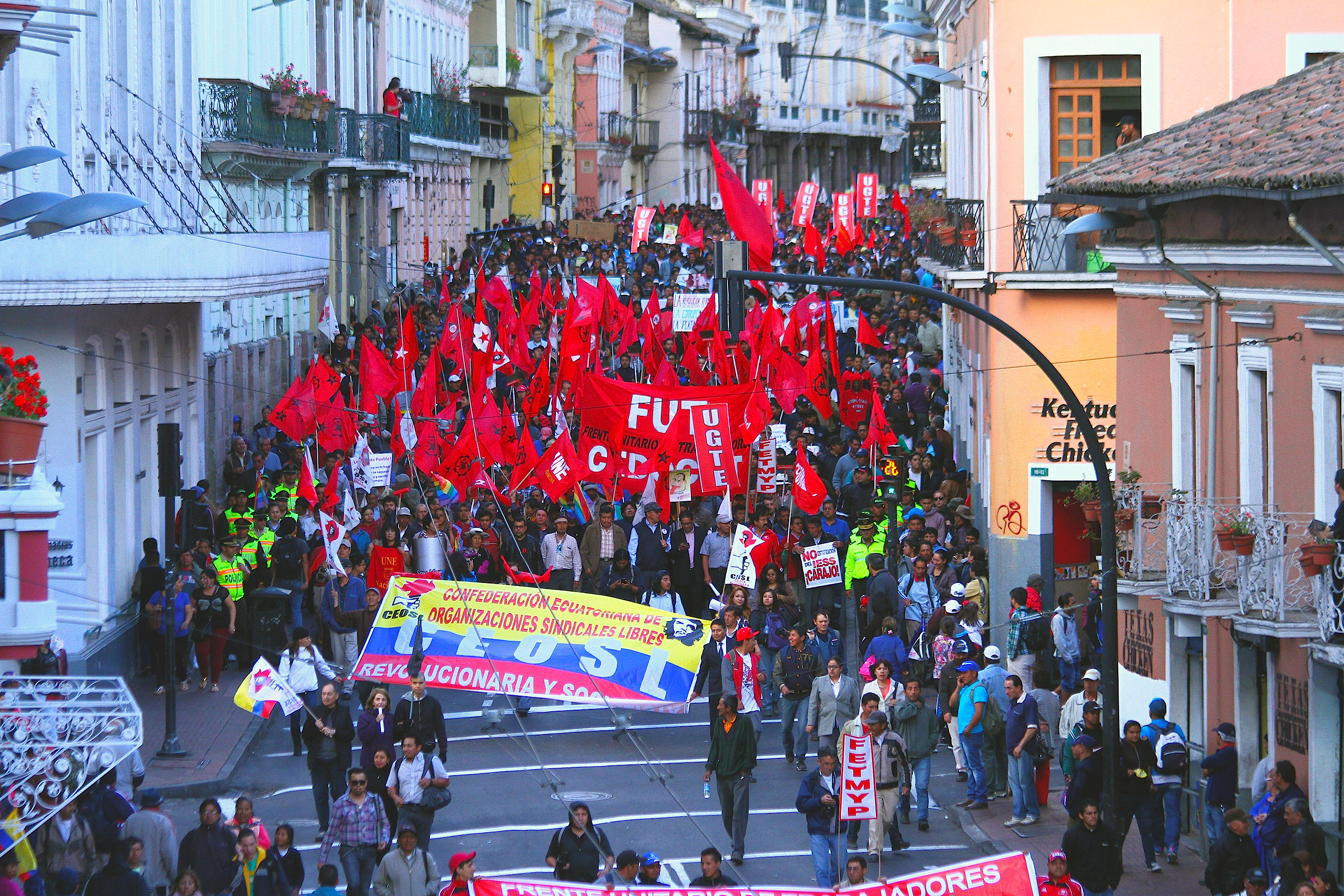
Workers, trade unionists and members of FUT protesting against Correa's policies on 24 June.

On June 24, Guillermo Lasso led a march to the National Assembly of Ecuador to demand the permanent withdrawal of the proposed tax bills. Workers and trade unionists, mainly from the Frente Unitario de los Trabajadores (FUT), demonstrated in Quito denouncing Correa's policies, calling them "anti-popular" and were planning a national strike. Mesías Tatamuez, leader of FUT stated that the protests weren't related to taxes and weren't intended to destabilize of the Ecuadorian government as President Correa had stated. The workers' protests involved the sweeping of streets to represent the "cleansing" of corruption from Ecuador and the burning of an Alianza País flag.

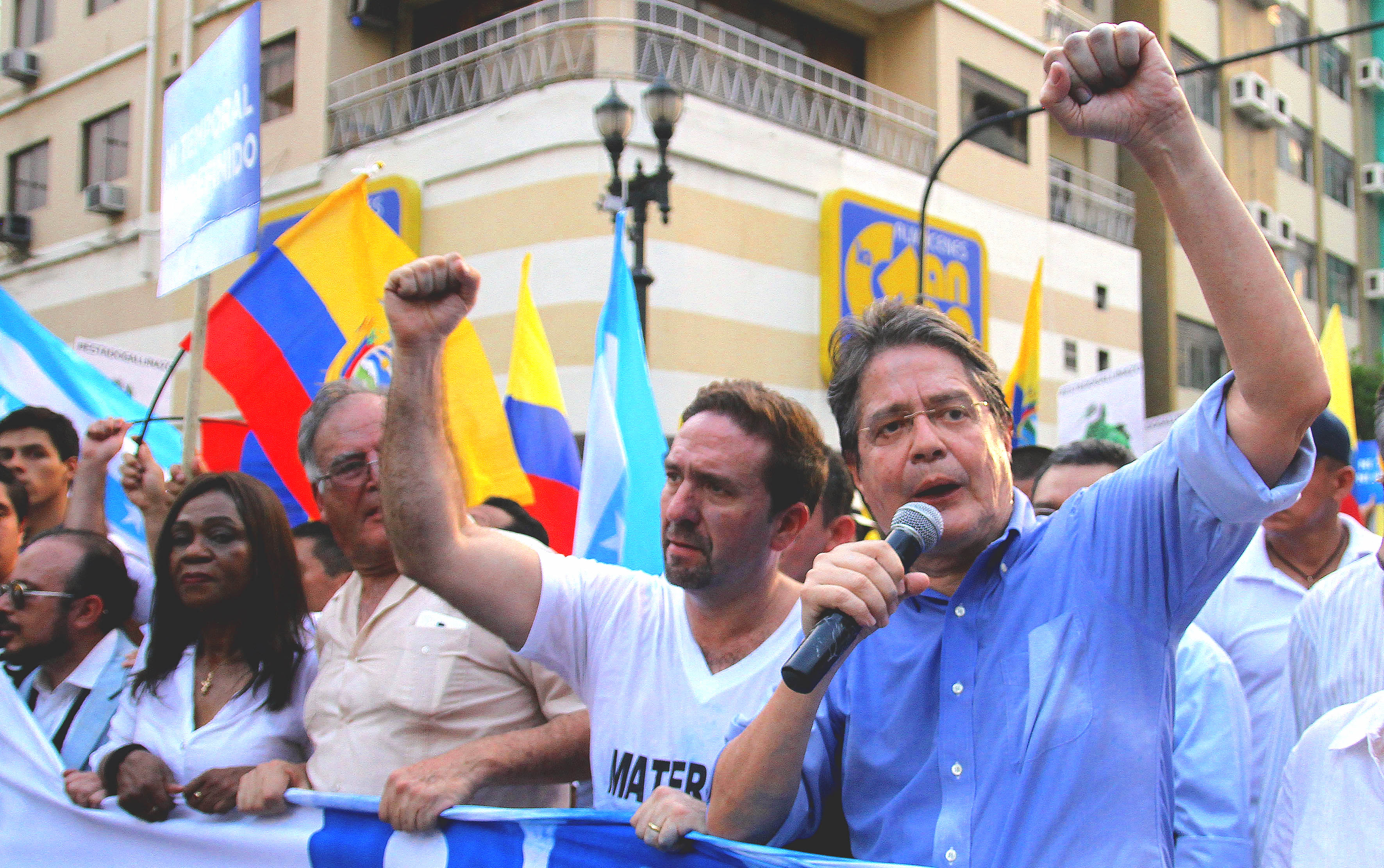
Guillermo Lasso leading a march in Guayaquil on 25 June.

On June 25 in Guayaquil, Mayor Jaime Nebot led a demonstration of about 400,000 people, or about 20% of the city's population. The demonstrators gathered in light blue and white colors of Guayaquil's flag, and Nebot stated that he was not protesting against Correa but the "totalitarian system" he said Correa wanted to impose. Public buildings near the march were decorated by the Ecuadorian government, including a banner denouncing the accumulation of wealth.

In Quito, demonstrators congregated on Shyris Avenue and Mayor Mauricio Rodas denounced the new taxes.

=== July ===
In Quito, Guayaquil, Cuenca and other cities, thousands protested against Correa on July 2, days before Pope Francis' visit to the country. The Ecuadorian government held a countering rally at the president's palace.

Hundreds also protested on July 9 outside of the Alianza País headquarters denouncing the proposed taxes and alleged autocratic and corrupt actions. The protesters waited for Pope Francis to complete his visit to Ecuador before protesting again.

=== August ===
In early August, workers, union leaders and Indigenous leaders blocked roads to Quito and other cities in opposition to the taxes and the proposed constitutional amendment allowing unlimited terms for re-election. They also called for a general strike. Tens of thousands of people demonstrated in Quito, and thousands of Indigenous people marched hundreds of miles to Quito in protests of oil and mining projects. CONAIE and other social movements joining the march called on the government to end police brutality against protestors and release detainees.

On August 15, the government declared a state of exception allowing the military to crackdown on protests. The measure was officially a response to increasing activity of the Cotopaxi volcano, but it applied to the entire country. CONAIE and other groups criticised the measure for its broad application outside the area of the volcano.

Additional marches protesting the constitutional amendments and resource extraction projects took place in September.

== Public opinion ==
According to Cedatos-Gallup International polls from six major cities in Ecuador between 10 and 11 June, 70% of Ecuadorians disapproved of the real estate tax and 72% disapproved of the inheritance tax. Cedatos also observed President Correa's popularity drop from around 60% in recent years to 42% in 2015.

Polls also showed that a clear majority of people favored a popular referendum on the constitutional amendment permitting indefinite re-elections.

== Internet outages ==
While protesters were demonstrating in Quito and Guayaquil, some internet users were unable to connect to a network with explanations ranging from network over-saturation to the use of signal jammers by the Ecuadorian government. The use of peer-to-peer applications increased during the protests due to the network problems with opposition MP Andres Paez recommending the use of the FireChat app. The media also reported Denial-of-service attacks and the creation of fake media accounts to falsify reports. It has also been reported that the Ecuadorian government uses "troll centers" to attack their opposition.

== See also ==
- 2012 Ecuadorian protests
- 2019 Ecuadorian protests
- 2020 Ecuadorian protests
- 2022 Ecuadorian protests
- 2014–15 Venezuelan protests
- 2015 protests in Brazil
- List of protests in the 21st century

== Sources ==
- Philip, George; Panizza, Francisco (2011). The Triumph of Politics: The Return of the Left in Venezuela, Bolivia and Ecuador. Cambridge: Polity Press. ISBN 978-0-7456-4749-4.
