= Jaime Vargas =

Jaime Vargas may refer to:

- Jaime Vargas (ballet dancer), Ballet Master of the Royal Winnipeg Ballet in Canada
- Jaime Vargas Vargas (born 1979), Ecuadorian indigenous leader
- Jaime Vargas (politician), incumbent president of the National Assembly of Panama
