= 2020 Ecuadorian protests =

Mass protests in Ecuador in 2020

2020 Ecuadorian protests (Fuera Moreno!)
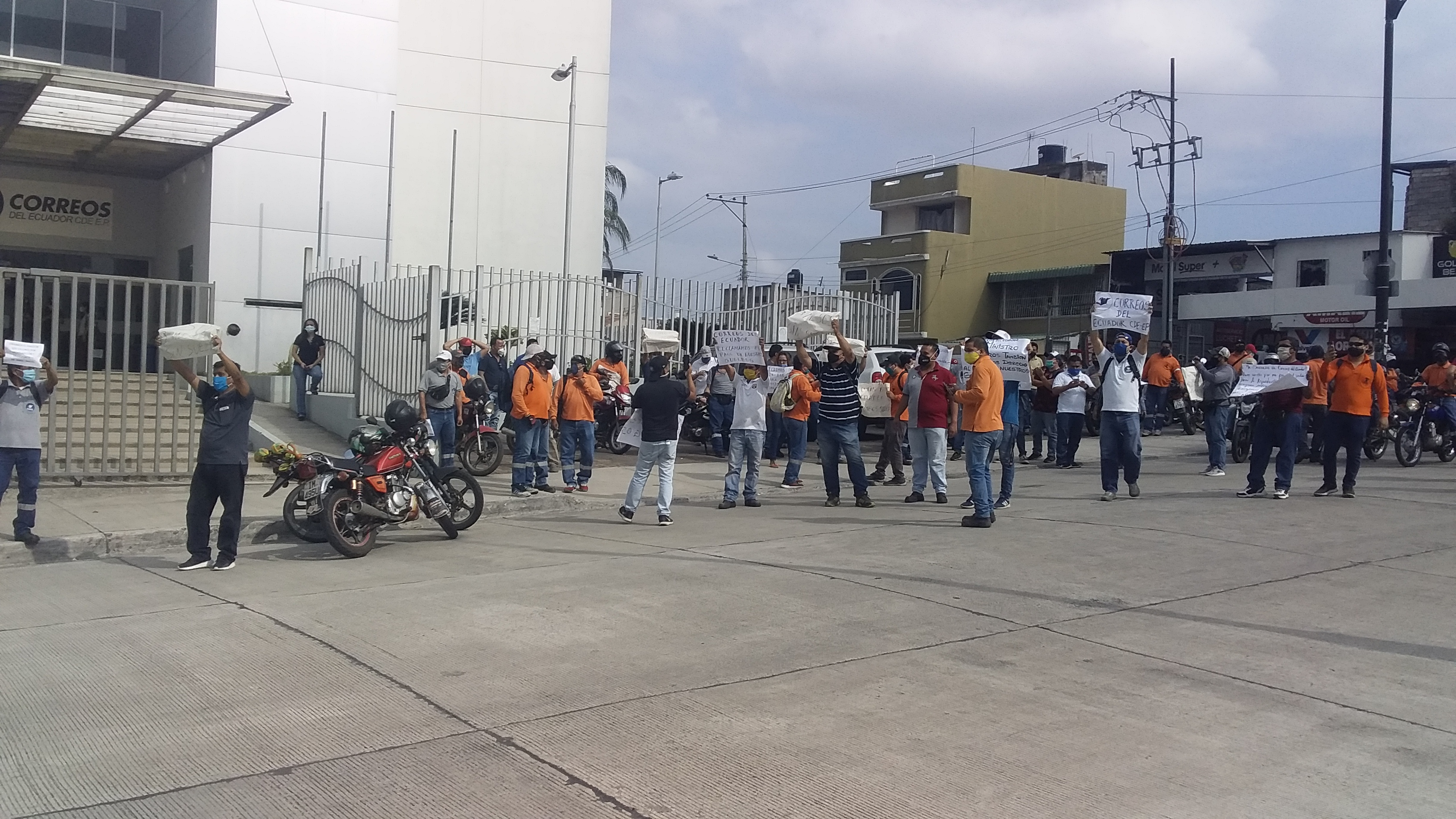
- Date: May 1, 2020 – October 28, 2020
- Location: Ecuador
- Caused by: Worker’s wage and $98 million dollar spending; Handling of COVID-19 pandemic
- Goals: Resignation of President Lenin Moreno; Better handling of COVID-19
- Methods: Demonstrations, Riots
- Result: Protests suppressed by force

Parties
(Ecuador) Protesters	Government of Ecuador; National Police of Ecuador; Armed Forces of Ecuador

The 2020 demonstrations in Ecuador were a series of national mobilizations carried out beginning on May 1, 2020, after the announcement of economic measures by the government of Lenín Moreno and the approval in the second debate of the Organic Law of Humanitarian Support by the National Assembly, adopted due to the serious health and economic crisis generated by the COVID-19 pandemic.

== Background ==
=== October 2019 demonstrations ===
At the beginning of October of the previous year, the organizations of the Unitary Front of Workers (FUT), the Confederation of Indigenous Nationalities (CONAIE), and the Popular Front (FP) called for a national strike that led to the abandonment of the measures to eliminate the gasoline subsidy. Despite this, the government undertook other economic measures that the organizations that called the previous demonstrations did not like, such as the "Tax Simplicity and Progressivity Law".

=== COVID-19 pandemic ===
The management of the COVID-19 pandemic by the Moreno government has been the worst evaluated in the Latin American region according to opinion polls. The hospital crisis that occurred in Guayaquil was news in various international media and the president of El Salvador, Nayib Bukele, exposed the situation as a bad example of pandemic management.

=== Humanitarian Support Law and economic measures ===
During the time of the COVID-19 pandemic and the national quarantine, the Moreno government has carried out several national channels to announce various economic measures to mitigate the crisis caused by the pandemic. After Black Monday, on March 11, Lenín Moreno announced a package of measures that included the targeting of fuel subsidies, this after talking with the International Monetary Fund (IMF) and representatives of different sectors. Days later, on the 16th, the Minister of Economy, Richard Martínez announced the payment of the debt of $324 million for the 24th of the same month, an act that he complied despite the refusal of the National Assembly. In May, Martínez admitted that paid 1,000 million to Credit Suisse and Goldman Sachs in April, declaring that it was seeking to achieve a debt restructuring, that same month a cut in the education budget was announced. On April 16, the sending of the "Organic Law of Humanitarian Support" was announced, which would be approved on May 15 by the Assembly. Rejected by social organizations as they do not consider possible agreements between employees and employers, as well as their opposition to a reduction in working hours that represents a reduction in salary. On May 19, a new package of measures eliminated public companies such as TAME, Correos del Ecuador, Ferrocarriles del Ecuador, Siembra, Real Estate, Public Media and others. Adding to this a new announcement of salary reduction and new taxes that had already been announced.

== Timeline ==
=== May ===
On Labor Day, minor sit-ins under biosecurity measures were held in different places, such as the Plaza de la Iglesia de Santo Domingo in Quito, questioning the passage to the "new normal" and the payment of the debt. Together with them, the Eugenio Espejo Hospital staff mobilized to get more supplies against COVID-19 and respect for their jobs. In turn, a cacerolazo was announced against the Moreno government. Faced with the budget cut to education, student organizations such as the Federation of University Students (FEUE) and that of Secondary Students (FESE) summon a sit-in in the Plaza Indoamérica in Quito that came to maintain biosecurity measures. While the Central University of Ecuador (UCE) announces the suspension of enrolment due to the cut, while a group of private universities makes a claim of unconstitutionality like the Popular Unity Movement. On 11 May, A new mobilization against the budget cut made from student organizations is carried out at the national level. Between 25 and 26 May, doctors and healthcare workers were on strike, demanding democratic reforms and better government wages. Between 18 and 22 May, anti-government remonstrances led by university students were held in-front of the national universities.

=== September ===
On September 16, in Quito, hundreds of people mobilized in the historic center to protest the economic measures and the government's management. On September 18, in Quito, students, teachers and administrative staff of the National Polytechnic School protested against cuts in the budgets of public universities.

=== October ===
On October 12, indigenous groups and social groups protested in Quito, to commemorate and pay tribute to the fatal victims of the October 2019 protests, unsuccessfully trying to demolish the statue of Queen Isabel la Católica.

== See also ==
- 2019 Ecuadorian protests
- 2015 Ecuadorian protests
- 2012 Ecuadorean protests
