= Ecuadorian Revolution of 2005 =

Widespread protest in Ecuador

- Date: March 2005 – April 2005
- Location: Ecuador
- Goals: Regime change
- Methods: Protest march, political demonstration, strike, riot
- Result: Lucio Gutiérrez removed from office; succeeded by Vice President Alfredo Palacio

The Ecuadorian Revolution of 2005 was a widespread protest against corruption, high prices, and the rule of President Lucio Gutiérrez that paralysed Ecuador in 2005. It included mass demonstrations, general strikes and popular rioting and violent clashes. What started as nonviolent anti-government protests in March mushroomed into violent rioting and spread countywide. Protesters demanded the fall of the government and an end to corruption. Political tensions had been rising since the return of former President Abdalá Bucaram to Ecuador and a ruling by the Supreme Court clearing him of corruption charges.

== Revolt ==
Protesters took to the streets in large numbers not seen since 1997. Protestors called for an end to corruption, austerity measures, refunds and the return of subsidies for fuel and basic food stuffs. 10,000-25,000 protesters marched throughout the country on 19–22 April. The military quashed protests, leading to violent scenes.

The government of Lucio Gutiérrez was forced to flee and resign in April 2005.

In August, rioting occurred, halting oil production. Massive street protests demanded wage increases and better lifestyle conditions. Protesters also demonstrated against the oil shutdown.

A wave of social unrest led to a state of emergency in March 2006. In April, hundreds were injured during youth protests and clashes with soldiers amid growing civil disobedience and campaigns.

== See also ==
- 2019 Ecuadorian protests
