= 2019 Ecuadorian protests =

Anti-austerity protests against President Lenín Moreno

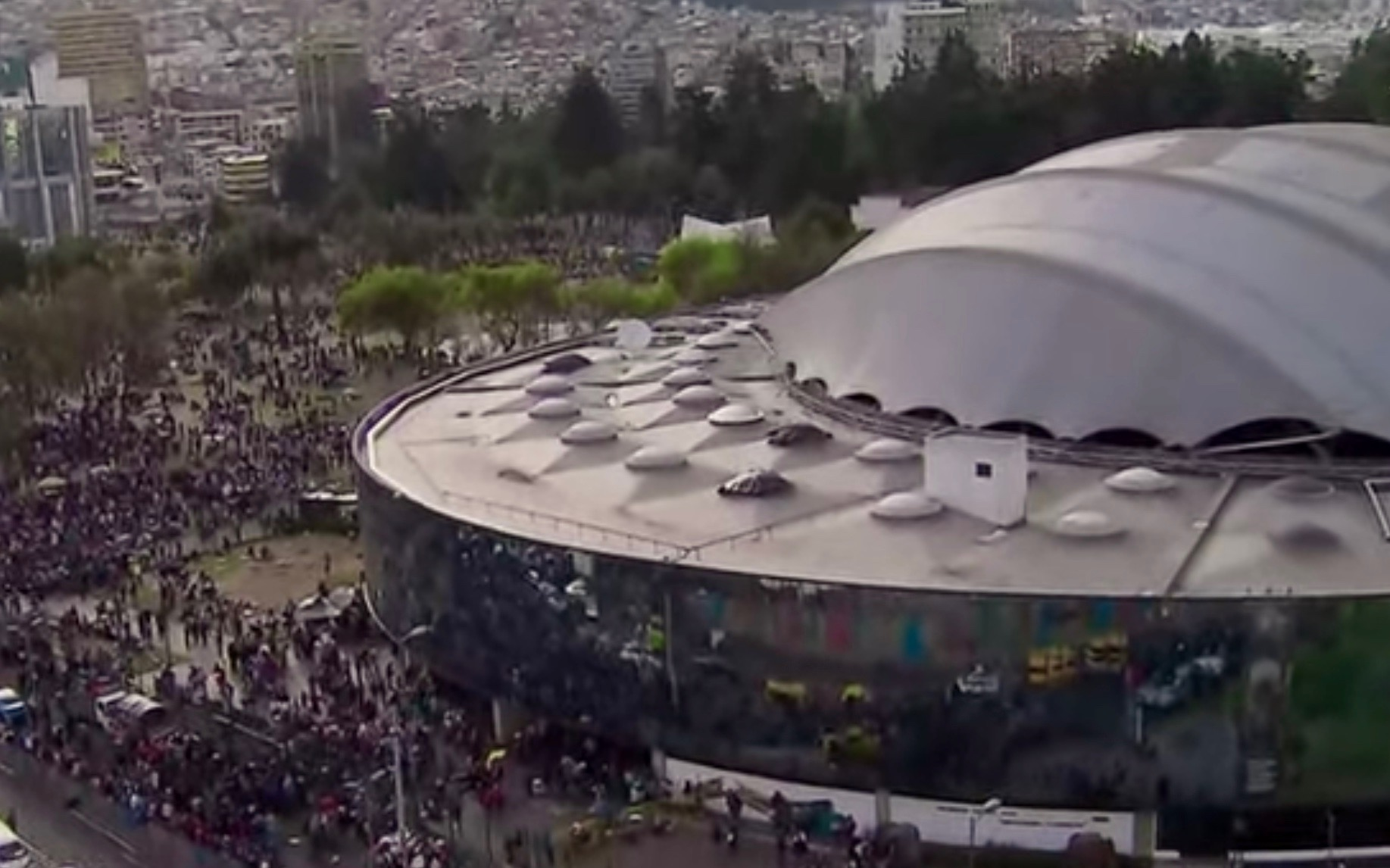
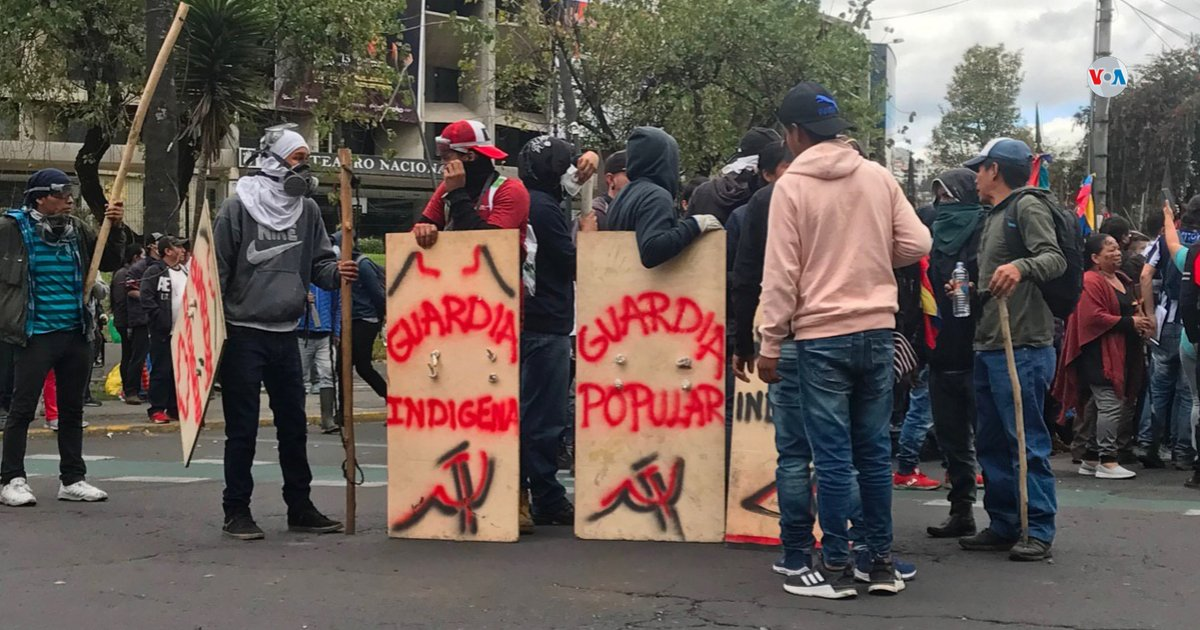
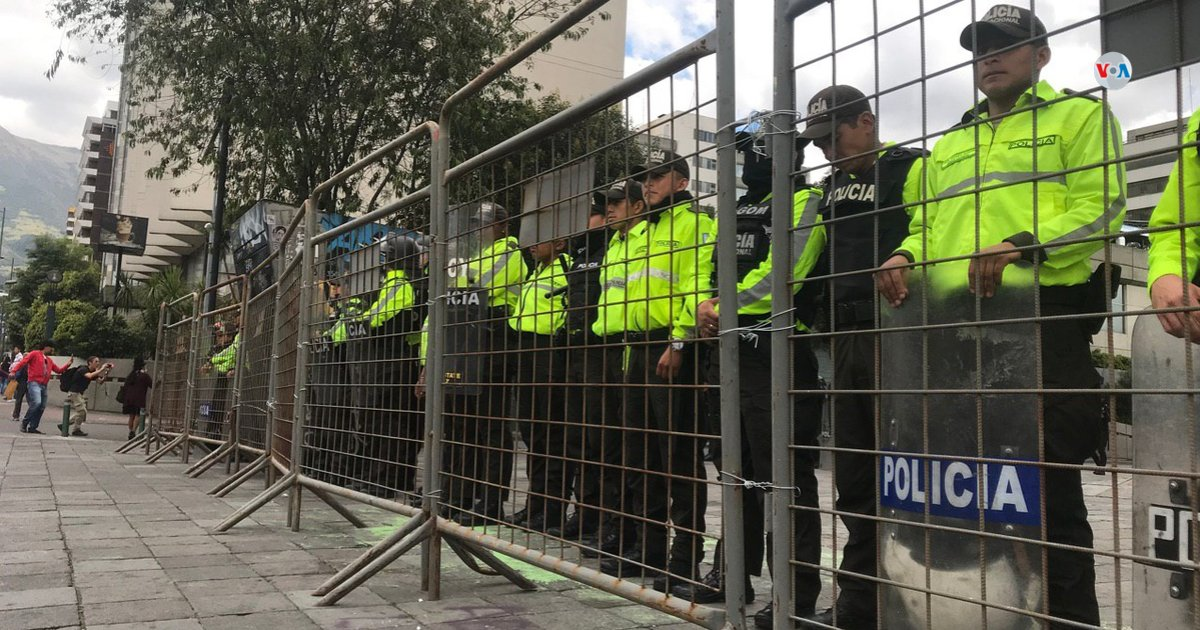
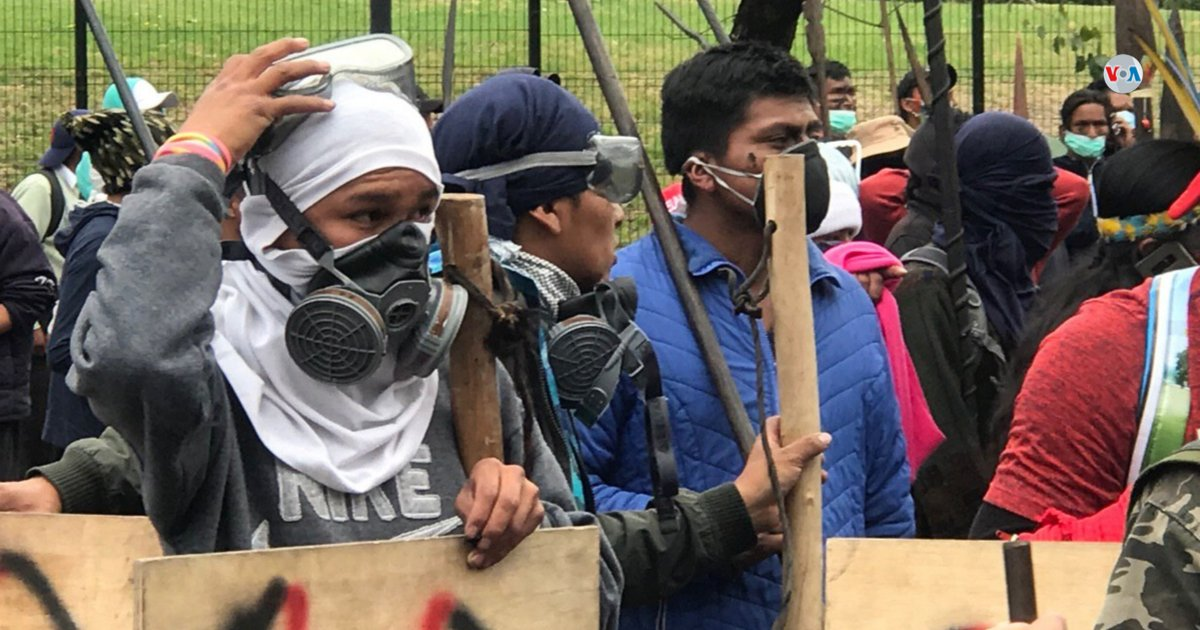
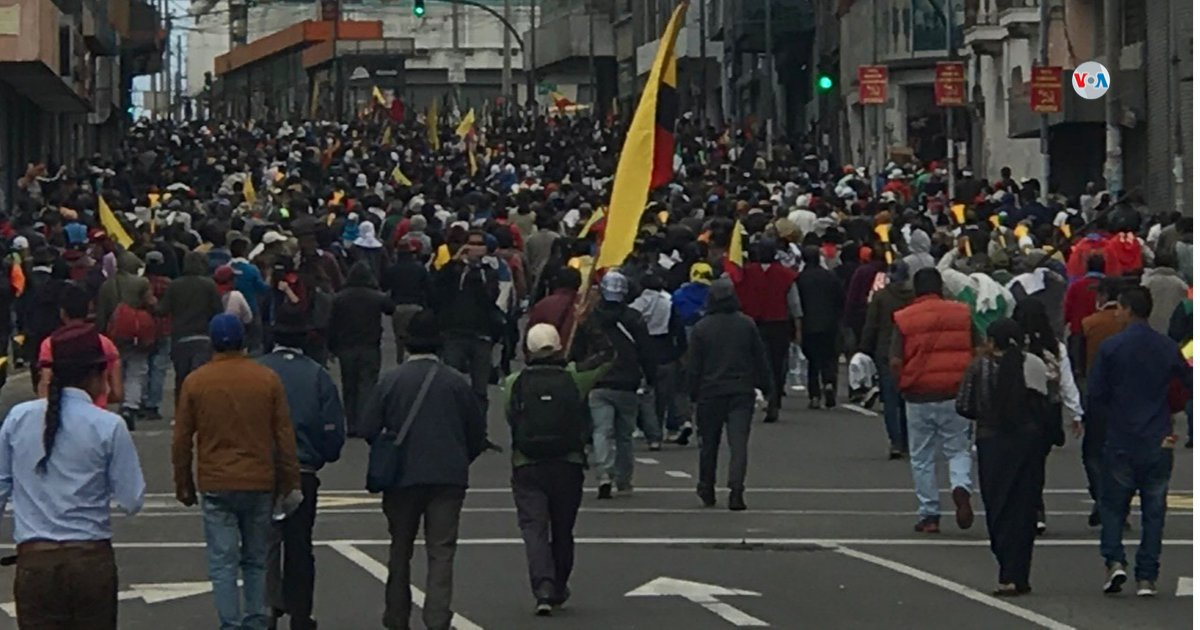
- Graph of the manifestations nationwide. (Top to bottom, left to right): Protesters gathered near the indigenous headquarters at the Casa de la Cultura Ecuatoriana on 10 October. Masked protesters with makeshift shields. National Police of Ecuador gathered near a barrier.
- Date: 3 October 2019 – 14 October 2019
- Location: Ecuador
- Caused by: Austerity measures
- Goals: Return of fuel subsidies; End of austerity measures; Resignation of President Lenín Moreno
- Result: Return of fuel subsidies

Parties
Government of Ecuador: Armed Forces of Ecuador; National Police of Ecuador; PAIS Alliance; Supported by Brazil	(Ecuador) Opposition: Frente Unitario de los Trabajadores (FUT); Confederation of Indigenous Nationalities of Ecuador (CONAIE); Federation of University Students of Ecuador (FEUE); Popular Front; Supported by Venezuela

Lead figures
(Ecuador) Lenín Moreno (Ecuador) Otto Sonnenholzner (Ecuador) María Paula Romo	(Ecuador) Rafael Correa; (Ecuador) Jaime Vargas; (Ecuador) Leonidas Iza

Casualties
- Deaths: 8
- Injuries: 1,340
- Detained: 1,192

The 2019 Ecuadorian protests were a series of protests and riots against austerity measures including the cancellation of fuel subsidies, adopted by President of Ecuador Lenín Moreno and his administration. Organized protests ceased after indigenous groups and the Ecuadorian government reached a deal to reverse the austerity measures, beginning a collaboration on how to combat overspending and public debt.

== Background ==
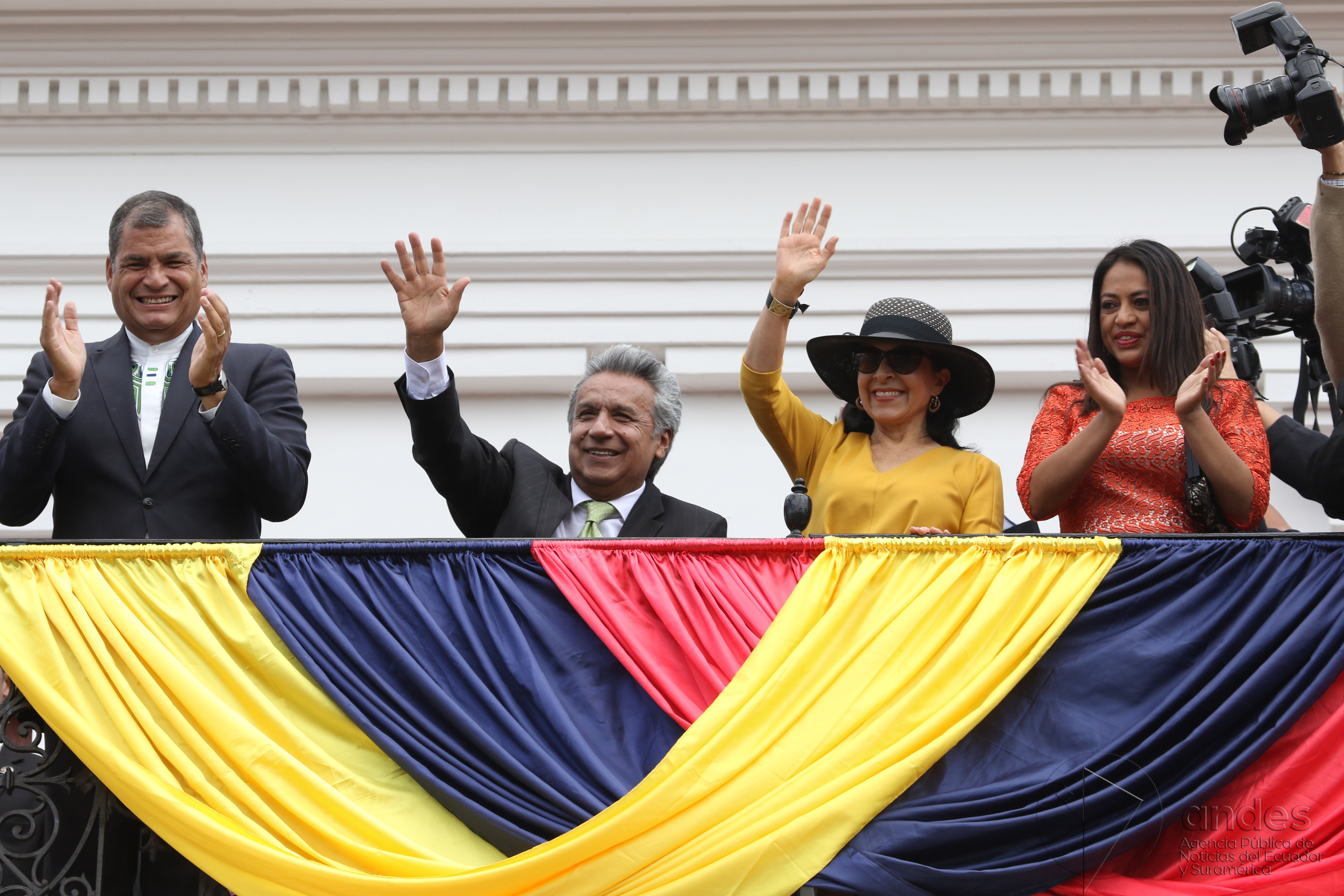
Former President Rafael Correa (left) attends President-elect Lenín Moreno's (middle) 'changing of the guard' ceremony. The two PAIS leaders were considered close allies before Moreno's "De-correaization" efforts started after he assumed the presidency.

Beginning in 2007, President Rafael Correa established The Citizens' Revolution, a movement following left-wing policies, which some analysts described as populist. Correa was able to utilize the 2000s commodities boom to fund his policies, utilizing China's need for raw materials. Through China, Correa accepted loans that had few requirements, as opposed to firm limits set by other lenders. With this funding, Ecuador was able to invest in social welfare programs, reduce poverty and increase the average standard of living in Ecuador, while at the same time growing Ecuador's economy. Such policies resulted in a popular base of support for Correa, who was re-elected to the presidency twice between 2007 and 2013. Correa also utilized his popular support to increase power for himself and his 'citizen's revolution', drawing criticism that such acts were an entrenchment of power.

As the Ecuadorian economy began to decline in 2014, Correa decided not to run for a fourth term and by 2015, protests occurred against Correa following the introduction of austerity measures and an increase of inheritance taxes. Instead, Lenín Moreno, who was at the time a staunch Correa loyalist and had served as his vice-president for over six years, was expected to continue with Correa's legacy and the implementation of 21st century socialism in the country, running on a broadly left-wing platform with significant similarities to Correa's.

In the weeks after his election, Moreno distanced himself from Correa's policies and shifted the left-wing PAIS Alliance's away from the left-wing politics and towards the center. Despite these policy shifts, Moreno continued to identify himself as social democrat. Moreno then led the 2018 Ecuadorian referendum, which reinstated presidential term limits that were removed by Correa, essentially barring Correa from having a fourth presidential term in the future. At the time, Moreno enjoyed an approval rating of 80 percent. Moreno's distancing from his predecessor's policies and his electoral campaign's platform, however, alienated both former President Correa and a large percentage of his own party's supporters. In July 2018, a warrant for Correa's arrest was issued after facing 29 charges for corruption, for acts allegedly performed while he was in office.

Due to increased borrowing by Correa's administration, which he had used to fund his welfare projects, as well as the 2010s oil glut, public debt tripled in a five-year period and with Ecuador eventually coming to use of the Central Bank of Ecuador's reserves for funds. In total, Ecuador was left $64 billion in debt and was losing $10 billion annually. On August 21, 2018, Moreno announced economic austerity measures to reduce public spending and deficit. Moreno stated that the measures aimed to save $1 billion and included a reduction of fuel subsidies, eliminating subsidies for gasoline and diesel, and the removal or merging of several public entities, a move denounced by the groups representing the nation's indigenous groups, as well as trade unions.

By mid-2019, analysts stated that Moreno's overturning of Correa's policies, as well as the implementation of austerity measures and his turn towards centrism cost him political support, with his approval ratings dropping to about 30%. In the months leading up to the protests, other sporadic demonstrations began to occur against Moreno's government as well.

== Events ==
=== Economic measures ===
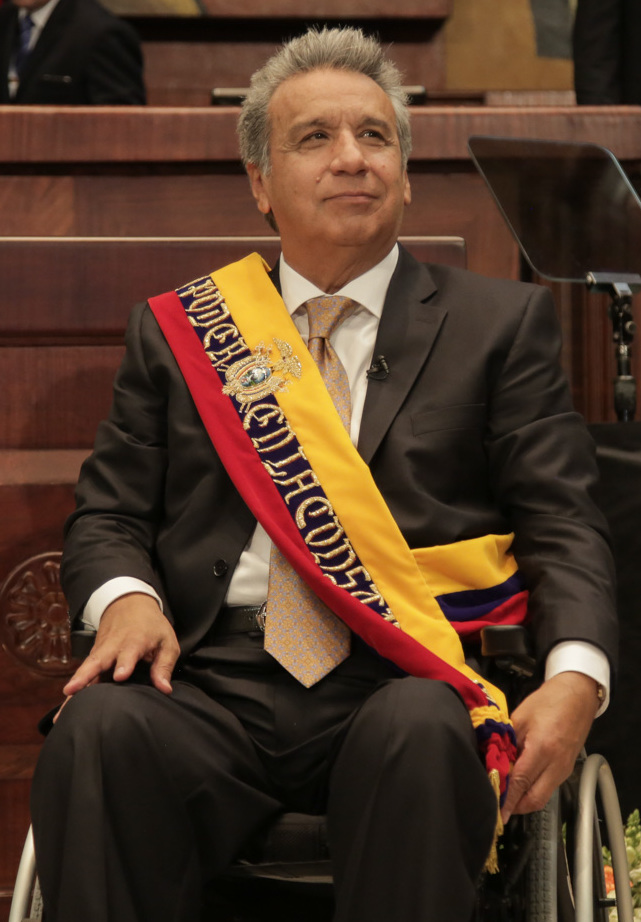
Lenín Moreno during his inauguration in 2017

The night of 1 October 2019, Lenín Moreno announced 6 economic measures and 13 restructuring proposals in order to stimulate the country's economy. It started with a speech declaring that there would not be an increase in taxes, Moreno mentioned he would do the following:

- Lower the price of Diesel and gasoline "extra" (Super) as well as ecopaís.
- Give an additional $15 USD per month as bonuses to 300 000 families.
- Eliminate or reduce extra tariffs for machinery and agricultural and industrial raw materials
- give out 1BN in housing credits starting in November, at a rate of 4.99%
- renovating occasional contracts with 20% less in remunerations
- laying-off 23,000 bureaucrats.

Moreno's government stated that the fuel subsidies had cost the country $1.4 billion annually and had been in place for 40 years. The cut of fuel subsidies resulted in diesel fuel prices doubling and regular fuel prices increasing 30 percent, angering transportation unions and businesses who started the protest movement. Businesses also panicked, leading to speculation, with a range of everyday costs spiking rapidly shortly after the decision. Indigenous groups have further stated that the IMF deal increased austerity and would promote inequality in Ecuador. The end of fuel subsidies was approved as the Decree 883. New prices took effect on October 3.

=== Protests begin ===
On October 2, 2019, the union central Frente Unitario de los Trabajadores (FUT), the Confederation of Indigenous Nationalities of Ecuador (CONAIE), the Popular Front and the student union Federation of University Students of Ecuador (FEUE) announced national protests against the government measures. that same day, the national Federation of Carriers (FENACOTIP) announced the paralysis of labour for October 3, day in which the decree 883 took effect and eliminated gas subsidies.

The protests began on October 3, 2019, as taxi, bus and truck drivers came out in protest against the planned abolition of the fuel subsidies. President Moreno declared a state of emergency the following day on 4 October 2019 four hours before protests began. The protests had crippled the country's transport network with all major roads and bridges blocked in the capital Quito. After reaching a deal with the government, a planned strike was cancelled by the groups.

Indigenous peoples' groups began protests shortly thereafter, along with university students and labour unions. The protesters declared their intention to hold an indefinite general strike, which would last until the government overturned its decision. Moreno refused to discuss a potential reversal, saying that he would "not negotiate with criminals", sparking clashes between the National Police and protesters, who were attempting to break into the Carondelet Palace in Quito. The Armed Forces were deployed by the government on 7 October to force protesters to release over 50 servicemen, who were being held captive by protesting indigenous groups.

=== Relocation of government ===
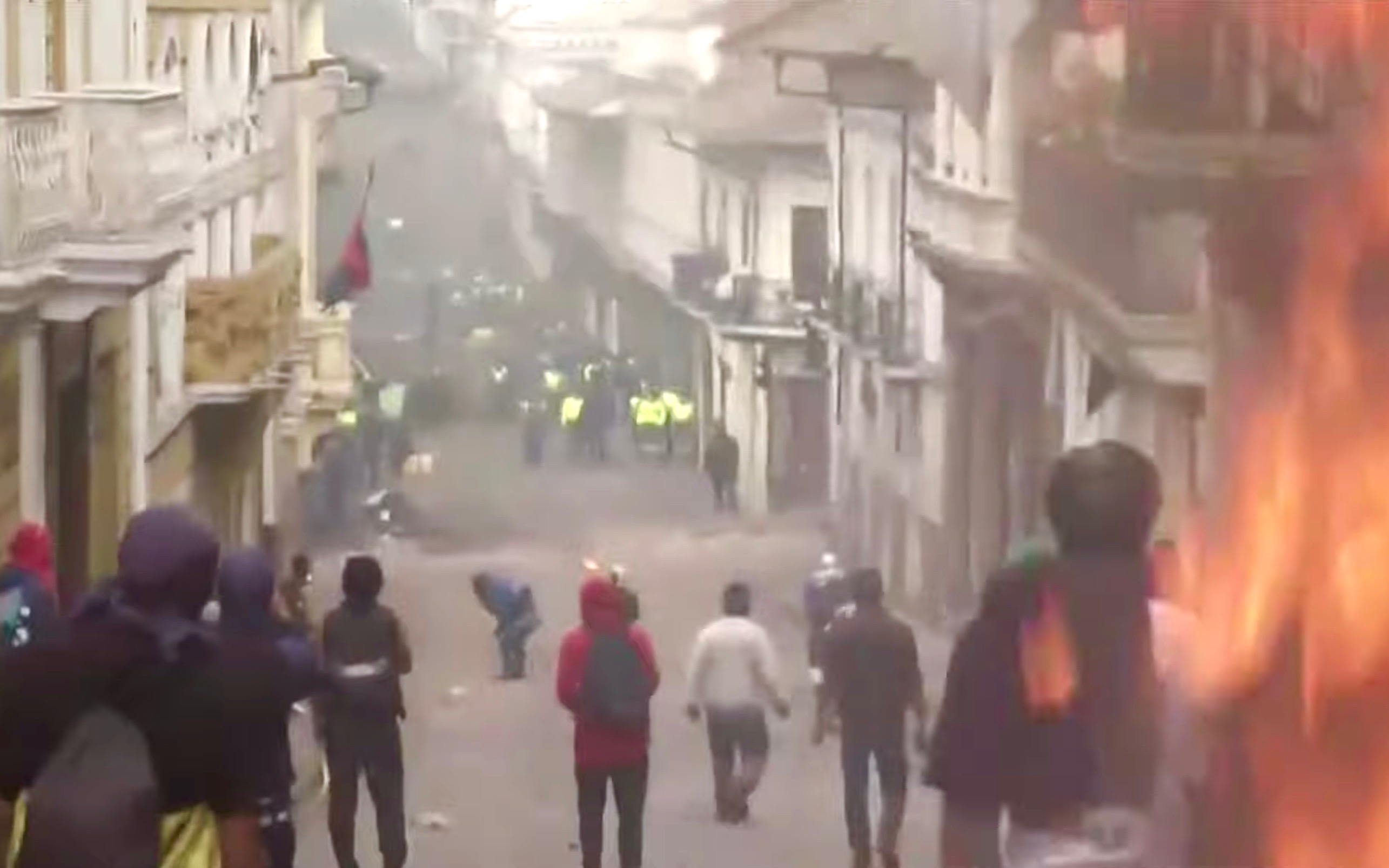
Protesters clashing with authorities on 9 October

On 8 October, President Moreno relocated his government to the coastal city of Guayaquil after anti-government protesters had overrun Quito, including the Carondelet Palace. On the same day, Moreno accused his predecessor Rafael Correa of orchestrating a coup against the government with the aid of Venezuela's Nicolás Maduro. Correa called for early presidential elections from his residence in Belgium and denied plotting a coup against Moreno with the help of Maduro. Correa admitted that he was employed as a consultant by President Maduro at the time.

Later that day, the authorities shut down oil production at the Sacha oil field, which produces 10% of the nation's oil, after it was occupied by protesters. Two more oil fields were captured by protesters shortly thereafter. Demonstrators also captured repeater antennas, forcing State TV and radio offline in parts of the country. Indigenous protesters blocked most of Ecuador's main roads, completely cutting the transport routes to the city of Cuenca. Former president Correa stated that President Moreno was "finished" and called for early elections from his home in Europe. The National Police raided the Pichincha Universal radio station as part of a public prosecutor investigation for allegedly "inciting to discord among citizens".

On 9 October, protesters managed to briefly burst into and occupy the National Assembly, before being driven out by police using tear gas. Violent clashes erupted between demonstrators and police forces as the protests spread further. Moreno declared that he would refuse to resign under any circumstance and imposed a night-time curfew on the nation.

=== National paralysis ===
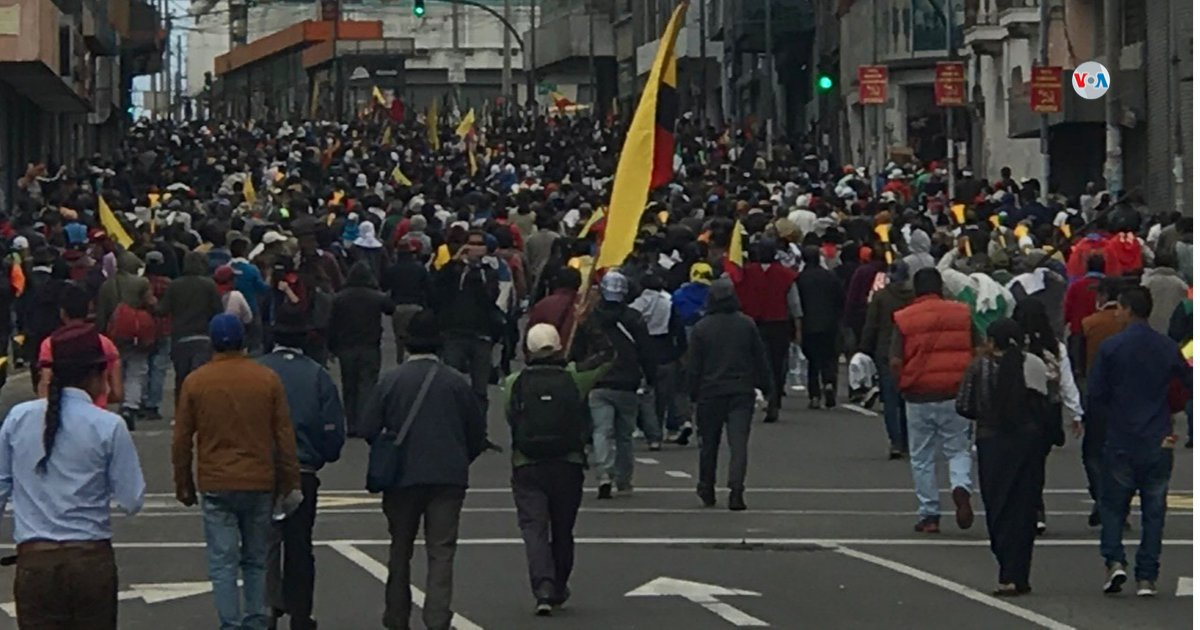
Protests on 11 October

On 10 October, Ecuador remained paralyzed as thousands of demonstrators marched and chanted demands for the return of the fuel subsidy and the resignation of President Moreno. Indigenous groups established headquarters at a cultural center in Quito. Demonstrators captured 10 police officers, making them take off their riot gear and carry the coffin of a dead indigenous protester before releasing them shortly thereafter. At the Casa de la Cultura Ecuatoriana, where protesters made their headquarters, the captured authorities were paraded in public.

While initially peaceful, violence erupted after the demonstrators were met by police, who attempted to disperse them using tear gas. Demonstrators responded by throwing stones, molotov cocktails and tube-launched fireworks at the mounted riot police officers sent to disperse them. The Energy Ministry reported that the country's main oil pipeline had ceased operating after being seized by indigenous protesters.

Indigenous protesters accused the nation's private media of ignoring reports of police brutality and demanded that they broadcast a statement made by the demonstrators on live television. At least three private broadcasters complied and aired the live declaration, in which protest leader Jamie Vargas called for more protests during the weekend and threatened to "radicalise the protests with more force" if the nation's president continued to "play" with the nation's indigenous population.

Seventeen Venezuelans were arrested at the Quito airport. According to military officials, they had maps of planned anti-government marches and information about Moreno's personal security arrangements. On 11 October, fifteen were released due to lack of evidence, while the remaining two were prohibited to exit the country.

=== Call for negotiations ===
CONAIE listed three demands in order to begin dialogue with Moreno: the dismissal of the ministers of government and defense, the repeal of the gas subsidies decree, and finally the request for the government to "take responsibility" for the deaths that occurred during the protests. On 11 October, Moreno announced, "The country must recover its calm, ... Let’s sit down and talk." In a response, CONAIE dropped the demand for the return of oil subsidies as a requirement for dialogue.

By 12 October, CONAIE had announced that they would participate in dialogue with the Ecuadorian government. However, violent protests intensified in Quito, with the national auditor office–which contained evidence surrounding corruption cases–being set ablaze, and two media facilities being attacked by demonstrators: the offices of Teleamazonas and El Comercio. While masked protesters broke into the facilities, press workers were left trapped. By 3:00pm, Moreno had decreed a national curfew and deployed the Ecuadorian army, stating "We are going to restore order in all of Ecuador" and explaining that the violent protesters were not related to organized indigenous groups, such as CONAIE, instead blaming drug traffickers, organised crime, and Correa supporters. In the few streets of Quito that were not blocked, taxi cabs formed a caravan that rolled through the city, honking and displaying anti-Moreno signs.

On 13 October, Ecuador's government stated that it had arrested 30 people accused of being involved in the previous day's burning of the auditor's office. Across the nation's capital, demonstrators set fire to car tires in order to block streets from the entry of Ecuador's military and police forces. CONAIE, the umbrella organization representing indigenous groups nationwide, stated that it would agree to enter into negotiations with Moreno's government after the latter declared a readiness to issue concessions, but added that it would continue to protest, despite the curfew declaration. The nation's military retook control of the park and streets leading to the National Assembly building and the torched auditor's office.

=== Return of fuel subsidies ===
During the late-night hours of 13 October, the Ecuadorian government and CONAIE reached an agreement during a televised negotiation. Both parties agreed to collaborate on new economic measures to combat overspending and debt. The government agreed to end the austerity measures at the center of the controversy and the protesters in turn agreed to end the two-week-long series of demonstrations. President Moreno agreed to withdraw Decree 883, an IMF-backed plan that caused a significant rise in fuel costs.

Following the announcement of the deal, demonstrators were seen celebrating in Quito. After occupying the city center for weeks during the demonstrations, the protesters conducted a community clean-up project, traditionally known as minga, as they left the area. While they returned makeshift barricades they had constructed from materials commandeered from construction sites, city employees removed trash in a concerted effort to restore the area.

On October 14, Moreno signed Decree 894 returning fuel subsidies to previous levels. He also promised to form a special commission, consisting of indigenous leaders and other social organisations, which will be tasked with proposing new measures to curb Ecuador's current budget deficit.

On 16 October 2019, the ombudsman Freddy Carrión announced the creation of a committee of the Defensoría del Pueblo to investigate human rights violations committed during the protests between 2 and 13 October.

On 17 October, the Frente Unitario de los Trabajadores (FUT) denounced the labor reforms announced by Lenín Moreno and called for protests to continue on 30 October.

=== Opposition prosecution ===
The government has blamed the chaos during the protests on former president Rafael Correa and the Citizen Revolution Movement (MRC). Lenín Moreno said that Correa was organizing an indigenous rebellion with the support of Nicolás Maduro, an allegation denied by Correa. Since the protests started on 2 October, various MRC leaders have been arrested.

On 7 October, MRC assemblyman Yofre Poma and Sucumbíos prefect Amado Chávez were arrested, accused of trying to paralyze public services, and a court ordered pre-trial imprisonment for Poma on 9 October.

On 12 October assemblywoman Gabriela Rivadeneira requested protection in the Mexican embassy in Quito, fearing detention for her criticism of the Moreno government. The Mexican Foreign Ministry also reported that opposition legislators Luis Fernando Molina, Soledad Buendía and Carlos Viteri as well as Leónidas Aníbal Moreno Ordóñez from the Pichincha Province, had also taken refuge at the Mexican embassy.

On the morning of 13 October, the police arrested former Durán mayor Alexandra Arce and raided her home as part of an ongoing investigation. Her digital devices were searched for messages in connection to the protests.

After the dialogue session of the government and CONAIE finished, on the morning of 14 October Paola Pabón, Christian González Narváez, and Pablo del Hierro were also arrested in connection to the protests. Hours later the police searched the house of former assemblyman Virgilio Hernández, whose whereabouts were then unknown.

On 22 October Ecuador's state prosecutors' office opened an investigation into Jaime Vargas, head of CONAIE, after Vargas said that CONAIE would create its "own army". CONAIE said Vargas was referring to a "communal guard" to protect its territory in accordance with the Ecuador constitution. The Indigenous group said that its leaders were being persecuted by the government since the anti-austerity protests had stopped. As a result, CONAIE paused talks with the government.

== Reactions ==
=== International ===
==== Governments ====
- Argentina, Brazil, Colombia, Guatemala, Peru, Paraguay – The six governments released a joint statement: "The governments of Argentina, Brazil, Colombia, Guatemala, Peru and Paraguay express their resounding rejection of any destabilizing attempt of legitimately constituted democratic regimes and express their strong support for the actions undertaken by President Lenin Moreno." The governments further added: "Likewise, they reject any action aimed at destabilizing our democracies by the regime of Nicolás Maduro and those who seek to extend the guidelines of their disastrous work of government to the democratic countries of the region."
- Chile – In a joint statement the presidents of Chile and Peru stated: "Presidents Martín Vizcarra and Sebastián Piñera ... reaffirm their support for the Government of President Lenín Moreno ... and strongly reject any attempt to destabilize the Ecuadorian democratic process."
- United States – Michael Kozak, the assistant secretary of state for Western Hemisphere Affairs, stated "Dialogue and respect for rule of law are core democratic values and the best way for the people of Ecuador to enjoy greater economic prosperity" and that the United States deplored "violence as a form of political protest."
- Venezuela – Nicolás Maduro tweeted: "I express my solidarity with the heroic people of Ecuador, children of Manuela Sáenz and the liberator sword of Marshal Antonio José de Sucre and the Libertador Simón Bolívar. Enough packages of the IMF! Enough misery! Strength Ecuador."

==== Solidarity protests ====
During the weekend of 12–13 October 2019, Ecuadorian citizens held demonstrations in support of the protesters in Madrid (Spain) and Paris (France).

== See also ==
- 1998–99 Ecuador financial crisis
- 2010 Ecuador crisis
- 2012 Ecuadorian protests
- 2015 Ecuadorian protests
- 2020 Ecuadorian protests
- Ecuadorean Revolution of 2005
- 2025 Ecuador protests
- List of fuel protests
- The causes of the 2019 Ecuadorian protests were similar to those in the 2008 Icelandic lorry driver protests
