= 2022 Ecuadorian protests =

2022 protests in Ecuador

2022 Ecuador protests National Strike (Paro Nacional)
- Part of 2021–2023 global energy crisis and the economic impact of the Russian invasion of Ukraine
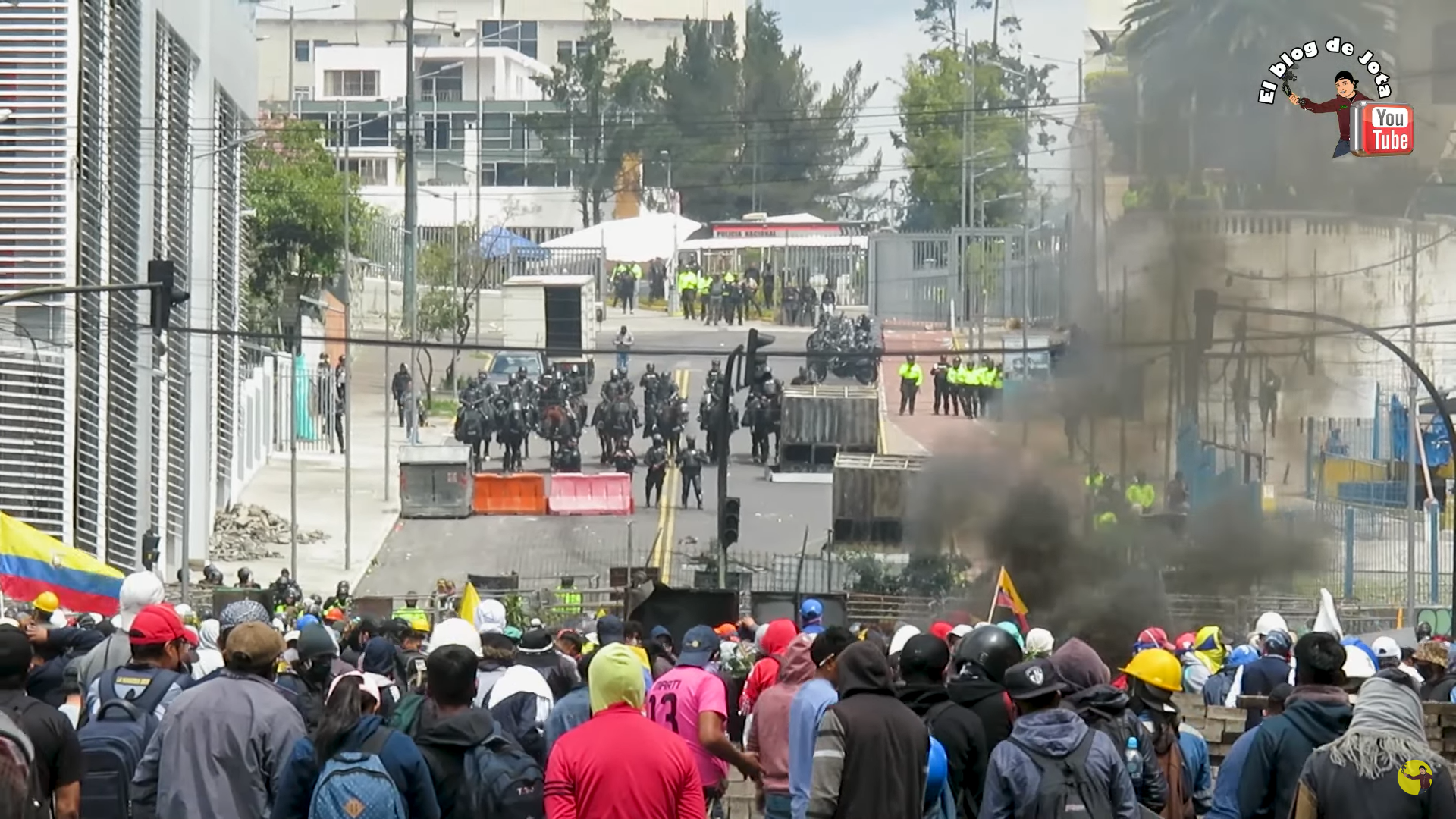
- Protests seen on 25 June 2022
- Date: 13 June 2022 – 30 June 2022
- Caused by: Inflation due to the COVID-19 pandemic and the Russian invasion of Ukraine; Economic policies of Guillermo Lasso
- Goals: Price reductions; Resignation of Guillermo Lasso
- Methods: General strike; March on Quito
- Result: Failed impeachment of Guillermo Lasso; National food and fuel shortages

Parties
Government: Armed Forces of Ecuador; National Police of Ecuador; Municipality of Quito; Municipality of Guayaquil	(Ecuador) Opposition: Confederation of Indigenous Nationalities of Ecuador (CONAIE); Pueblo Montubio del Ecuador; Fenocin; Feine; Frente Popular; FUT; UNE; FEUE; FESE; CUBE; FEI; Fenabe; Anti-governmental protesters

Lead figures
Guillermo Lasso; Alfredo Borrero; Patricio Carrillo; Francisco Jiménez; Luis Lara Jaramillo; Santiago Guarderas; Cynthia Viteri; Fernando Villavicencio	Leonidas Iza; Senaida Yasacama; Gary Espinoza; Eustaquio Tuala; Marlon Vargas

Casualties
- Deaths: 5 protestors
- Injuries: 331 civilians 120+ police officers
- Arrested: 150+

A series of protests against the economic policies of Ecuadorian president Guillermo Lasso, triggered by increasing fuel and food prices, began on 13 June 2022. Initiated by and primarily attended by Indigenous activists, in particular the Confederation of Indigenous Nationalities of Ecuador (CONAIE), the protests have since been joined by students and workers who have also been affected by the price increases. Lasso condemned the protests and labelled them as an attempted "coup d'état" against his government.

As a result of the protests, Lasso has declared a state of emergency. As the protests have blocked exits, entries and ports in Quito and Guayaquil, there have been food and fuel shortages across the country as a result. Lasso has been criticized for allowing violent and deadly responses towards protestors. The President narrowly escaped impeachment in a vote in National Assembly on 29 June: 81 MPs voted in favour of impeachment, 42 voted against and 14 abstained; 92 votes were needed to achieve impeachment.

== Timeline ==
The protest, which stems from the "structural social exclusion of indigenous peoples in Ecuador" and rising prices, is mainly led by the Confederation of Indigenous Nationalities of Ecuador (Conaie), and by student and worker collectives.

The protests began on 13 June 2022 As protests marched towards the country's capital in Quito, they increasingly began to get violent. On 14 June, CONAIE President Leonidas Iza was arrested by the National Police in the Latacunga Canton, which escalated the protests. Despite supporters calling his arrest illegal, an Ecuadorian judge ruled that his arrest was legal, he was released the same day due to substitute measures.

On 15 June, the protests have reached south of Quito and students, mainly from the University of Cuenca, later became involved with the protests. The same day, members of a transportation union in Quito joined in the protests due to rising fuel prices. The following day, protestors began to block roads and entry points to Quito and other cities such as Cuenca, Latacunga, Ambato, Tulcán, Ibarra and Riobamba. Reports of gas shortages near the Amazon River and mountainsides were reported.

On 17 June, the Education Ministry announced closure of in-person classes across the country and shifted to virtual classes due to the violent unrest. That same day, protestors managed to take control of the governments of the Pastaza Province and Morona-Santiago Province after breaching through police barricades while CONAIE filed an official complaint to the Justice Ministry against Lasso's government over Iza's arrest on 14 June. A few hours later, police confrontation towards protestors turned violent in Chimborazo Province where 40 people were injured and twelve were critically wounded. That same night, President Lasso implemented a curfew in Quito and also permitted police officials in the provinces of Pichincha, Cotopaxi and Imbabura to use deadly force.

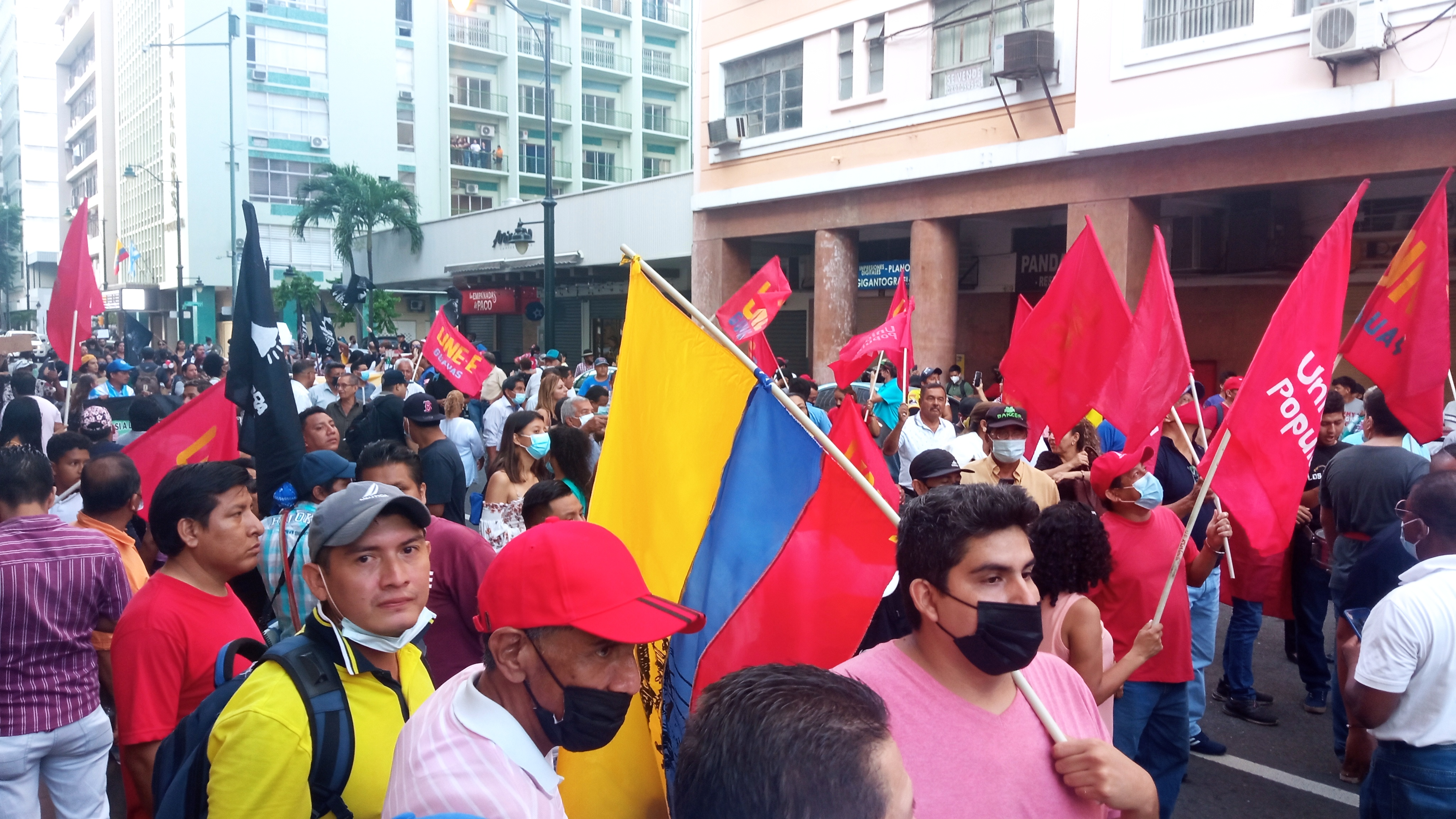
Protestors seen on 16 June 2022

Five days after the protests began on 18 June, President Lasso declared a state of emergency and lifted a restriction of information about the protests on social media. However, hours later, Lasso's government announced a "march of peace" and declared victory over the protests even though Lasso would eventually reverse this statement. Lasso's state of emergency decree was met with criticism within the National Assembly and eventually, assembly members asked to revoke the state of emergency. That same day, CONAIE President Iza had an assassination attempt made on him when visiting Latacunga. During the protests, many Ecuadorian news agency website were hacked by protestors domestically and internationally such as from Germany and the United States. On 19 June, protest indigenous leaders in the Ambato Province said they would cut off the province's water supply should citizens not join in support of the protests, however two days later the water supply would be shut-off due to contamination from burnt oil.

By 20 June, students from the Central University of Ecuador and transportation union members from Cuenca joined the protests and took part in the blockade of Cuenca. That same day, Lasso addressed the nation saying that the protests are aimed at removing him from power and issued a new state of emergency in which he would prohibit meetings in public areas, however welcomed peaceful protests. The National Assembly criticized Lasso's new state of emergency and held a meeting to revoke it. Hours later, when protestors were gathered in Quito, police officials detonated 25 bombs near caravans carrying the protestors which injured two people.

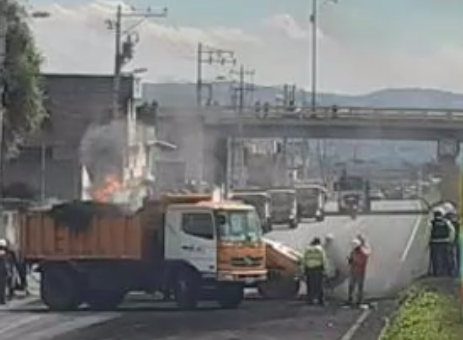
A highway in Quito being blocked by trucks as a result of the protests

On 21 June, protestors blocked food transportation ports in Guayaquil leading to a food shortage. Police investigators and Health Ministry officials launched an investigation against the protestors in Ambato, saying the protestors have contaminated the city's drinking water by pouring burnt oil into the reserves. That same day, the Defense Ministry condemened the protests and said that the "democracy of Ecuador is in serious risk". Police officials began detonating bombs at nearby universities in Guayaquil and Quito as response to student-led protests.

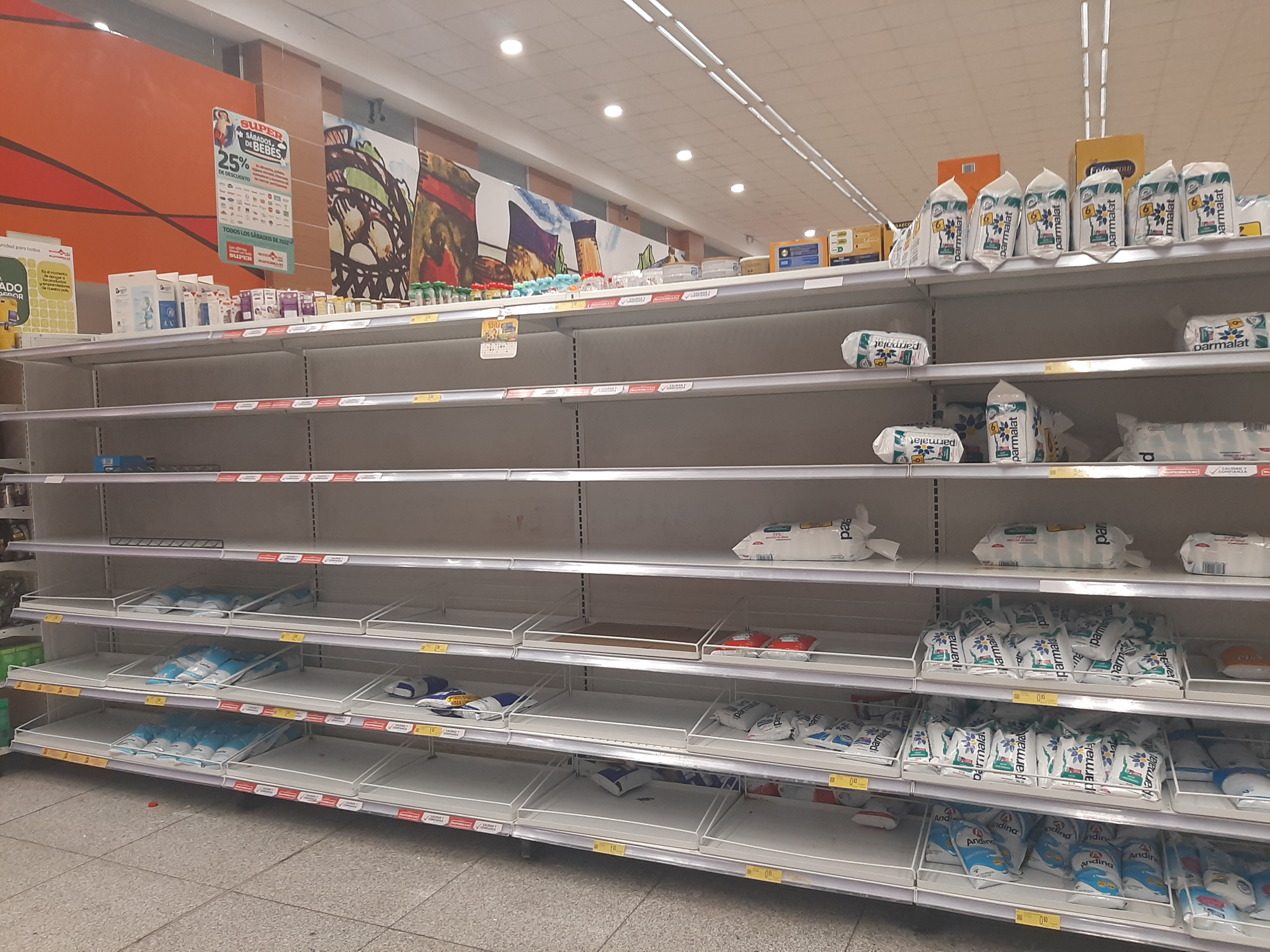
The protests have caused national food shortages

On 22 June, CONAIE officials announced the ratification of their list of demands in order to begin talks with Lasso's government. Government officials acknowledged this and said they would begin the review process of CONAIE's list of demands. Following day, ministry officials began to review who would mediate talks between CONAIE and government officials while extending Lasso's state of emergency declaration. On 23 June, violent clashes between military officials and protestors in San Antonio de Pichincha left 17 soldiers seriously injured, the destruction of three military trucks and the death of one protestor. That same night, counter-protests were held in Quito calling Iza a "terrorist" and accusing former President Rafael Correa as funding the protests.

On 24 June, protestors stormed the Egyptian Embassy in Quito and launched several bombs. That same day, protestors took control of the Cotopaxi Governor's Office and appointed a "Governor of the People" in the province. The following day, protests began to ease in Quito with Iza asking protestors to allow food products to enter the city to feed hungry protestors. Police officials in Quito recorded 3,823 cases of disturbances along with 138 arrests in the city between 13 June to 25 June.

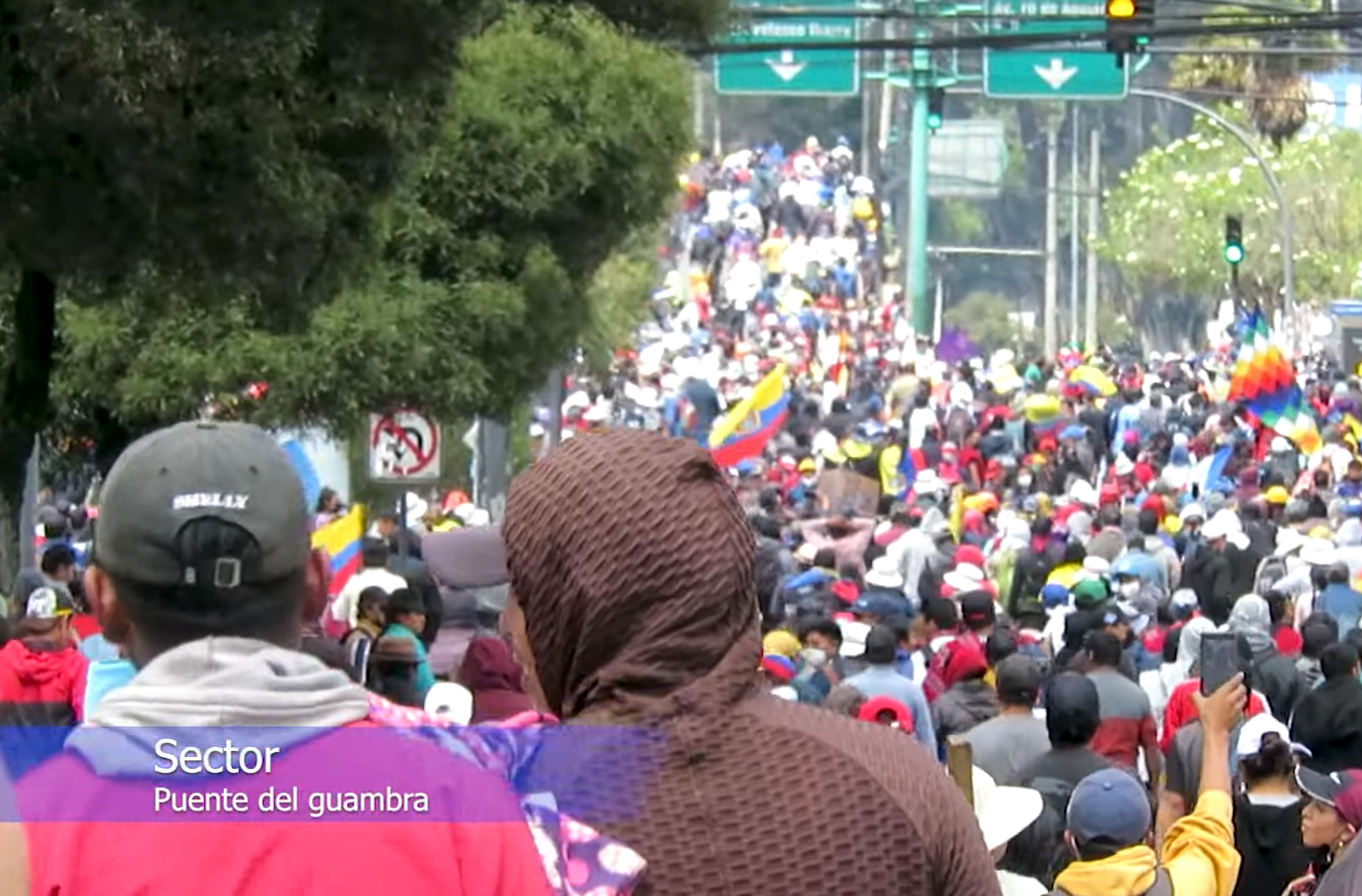
The protests seen on 21 June 2022

On 26 June, Lasso announced the reduction of fuel prices by ten cents. The following day, CONAIE criticized Lasso's fuel price reduction as insufficient and announced they will meet with grassroots organizers on an official response. On 28 June, a violent clash erupted between soldiers and protestors in the Sucumbíos Province over a convey of seventeen fuel tankers resulted in the death of one soldier. Hours later, Lasso denounced Iza and said he would meet with him for official talks to end the protests. In response, CONAIE called Lasso an "authoritarian leader" and said he would be responsible for ending potential talks to end the protests. President of the National Assembly condemned Lasso for not holding the peace talks while insisting that that is the only measure to end the protests. That same night, impeachment debates against Lasso resumed in the National Assembly, however failed as 80 assembly members voted to impeach Lasso, which is less than the 92 necessary votes to oust Lasso from power.

On 29 June, protestors in Morona-Santiago Province attempted to overthrow the provincial governor by detaining the provincial manager. Hours later, Morona Santiago governor Freddy Villamagua announced his resignation as part of a negotiation with protestors to free hostages, such as the provincial manager. That same night, Lasso declared a new state of emergency for the Imbabura, Azuay, Sucumbíos and Orellana provinces.

The protests have been noted for the national food and fuel shortages that it caused and the violent measures taken by protestors. During the protests, protestors have attacked civilians, burned police stations and began looting across the country. Causes for the shortages are due to blockades by the protests which reduced the amount of foods and products travelling in and out of Quito and Guayaquil. Several markets were forced to close due to violent protests and food prices soared as a result. The lack of domestic security which was brought by the previous administration of Lenin Moreno was also cited as a motivator for the protests.

== CONAIE demands ==
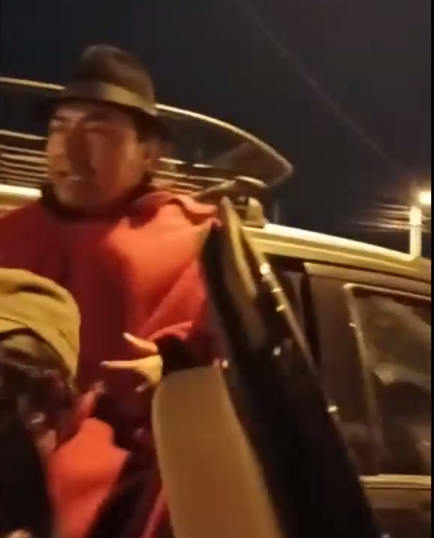
CONAIE leader Leonidas Iza getting arrested on 14 June 2022

The CONAIE released a list of ten demands on 13 June 2022, some of which have been met to varying degrees by the Ecuadorian government:

1. Reduction and freezing of the prices of fuel: diesel at $1.50 and extra and eco gasoline at $2.10. Abolish Decrees 1158, 1183, 1054, and focus instead on the sectors that need more subsidies: agricultural work, farming, transportation and fishing.
2. Economic relief for more than four million families with a moratorium of no less than one year, renegotiation of private debts with a reduction of interest rates, and the suspension of seizure of assets due to non-payment of those debts.
3. Fair prices on everyday food products and no royalty payments for farmers.
4. Policies and public investment to prevent or avoid job insecurity and the demanding of payment of debts to the IESS.
5. Moratorium on the expansion of the mining and oil industries, comprehensive audits and reparations for the sociological and environmental impacts of these industries, and the repeal of Decrees 95 and 151 on mining.
6. Respect for the twenty-one collective rights provided for in Article 57 of the Constitution: bilingual intercultural education, indigenous justice, prior consultation, and organization and self-determination of indigenous communities.
7. Stopping the privatization of public companies.
8. Policies to control prices and speculative pricing on basic necessities.
9. An urgent budget in the face of shortages in hospitals due to a lack of medical personnel and staff. Guaranteed youth access to higher education and the improvement of infrastructure in primary schools, secondary schools, and universities.
10. Security, protection, and generation of effective public policies to curb crime in the country.

== Responses ==
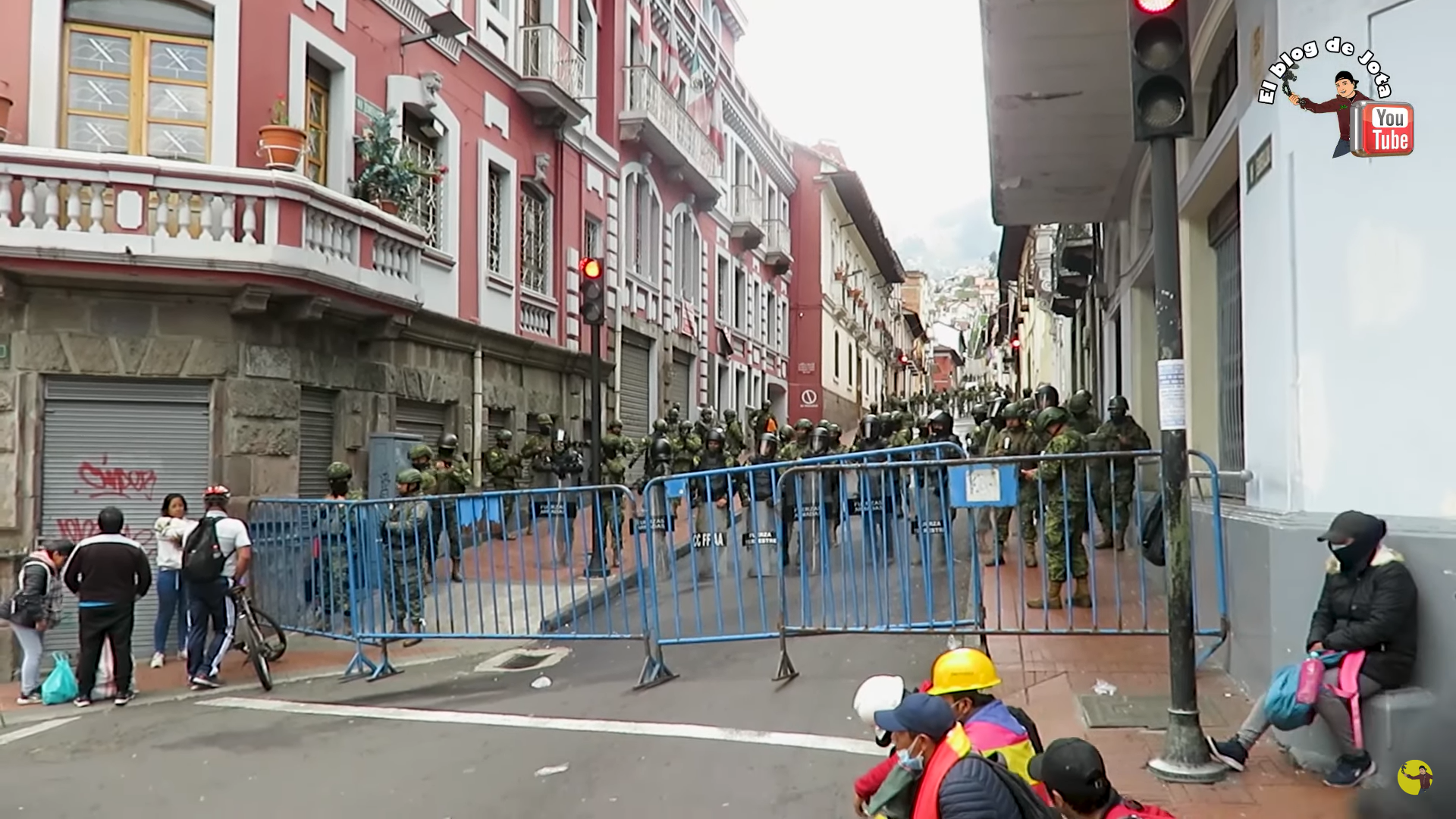
Military officials responding to protests in Quito on 25 June 2022

Amid the protests, the Japanese, German, Canadian, French, and Swiss embassies sent a joint communique in which they expressed their concern for "the continued, violent disturbance in the country, particularly because it affects fundamental human rights of the citizens." As such, they indicated that they recognize "the right to organize peacefully" and they urged both sides to come together for dialogue toward reconciliation and peace.

The ONG, Human Rights International, announced the withdraw of their personnel "after they became victims of physical violence, theft, and illegal detention before urging Leonidas Iza to reach "dialogue and respect for the human rights of those who are not participating in the protests and that violence and acts of vandalism do not serve as a sign of a desire to find a conclusion to this crisis."

On 22 June 2022, the United States Department of State issued a travel advisory to Ecuador over the rise of civil unrest and crime in the country relating to the protests. That same day, Pope Francis called on an end of violence amid the protests from both the government and protestors.

President Lasso issued an approximately six-minute, televised statement on 24 June 2022 in which he described the "violence perpetrated by criminals [who have] infiltrated [the movement]," only after having stated that "the real intention of Mr. Iza is the destabilization of the government." On 25 June, Lasso had announced that the International Monetary Fund had approved a $1 million disbursement of funds to the country in response to the protests.

On 25 June 2022, members of the National Assembly met with motions to begin an impeachment process towards Lasso over his handling of the protests.

== See also ==
- 2019 Ecuadorian protests – similarly triggered by a reduction in fuel subsidies
- 2022 Peruvian protests
- 2022 Sri Lankan protests
- List of protests in the 21st century
- 2023 Ecuadorian political crisis
- 2025 Ecuador protests
