= 2008 Icelandic lorry driver protests =

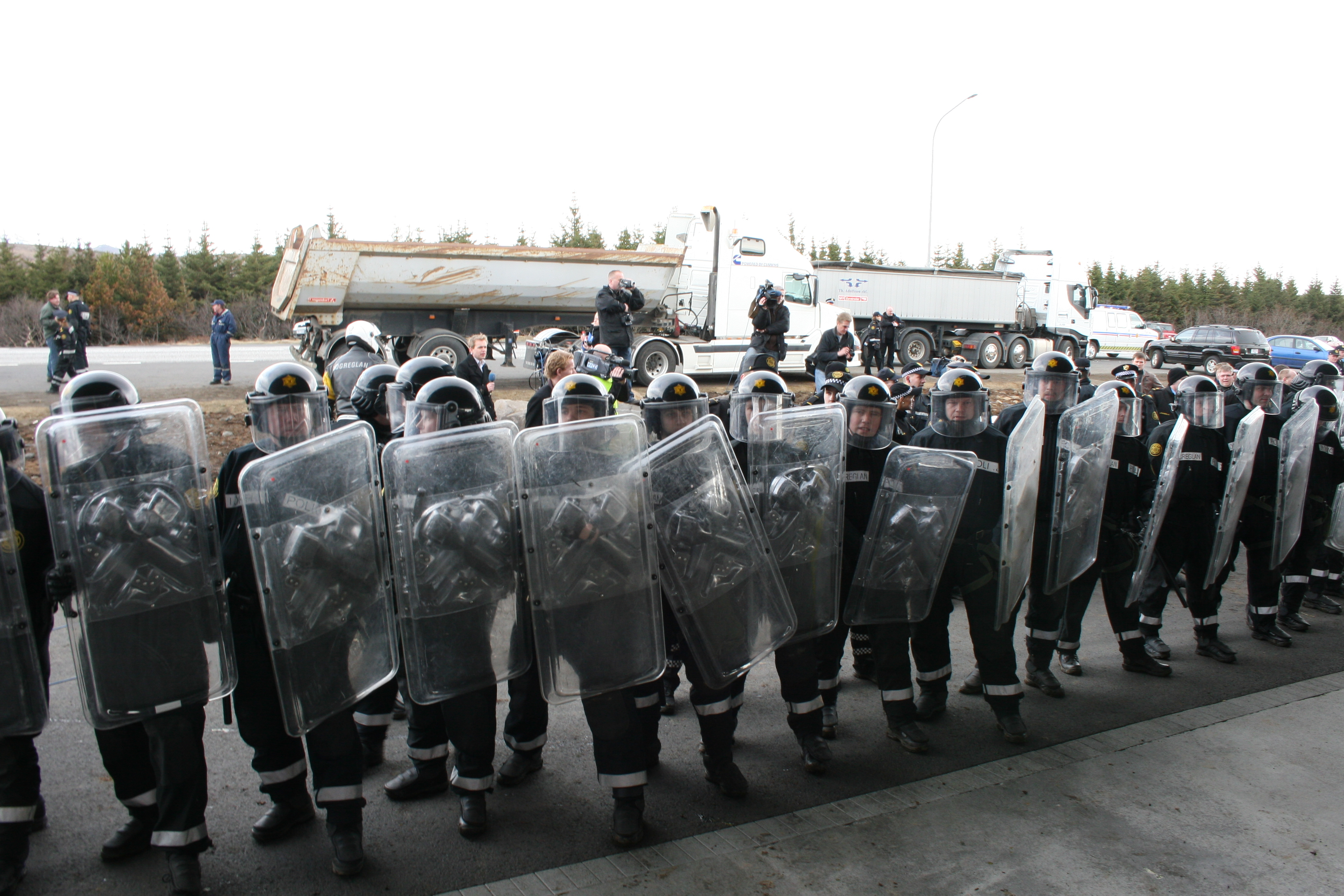
Icelandic police with riot shields on 23 April.

The 2008 Icelandic truck driver protests were protests started by truck drivers in Iceland through March−April 2008. The protest came about due to increasing oil prices and working hours.

== Background ==
In 2008, due to the 2008 Icelandic financial crisis, Icelandic oil prices were increasing rapidly, with one Icelandic reporting that fuel for his 4x4 truck cost as much as 12,000 kronas ($161).

Truck drivers began protesting against these prices, also aiming for lower tariffs on fossil fuels.

== Violence ==
Violence against protesters is very rare in Iceland.

According to a person's iReport footage, somebody from behind the police barricade sprayed a can of fluid into the crowd, possibly CS gas, as one protester is seen rubbing their eyes a few seconds later.

== Aftermath ==
Prime Minister Geir H. Haarde told the Fréttablaðið newspaper, “I am very sorry this happened. It is not in consistency with Icelandic traditions to solve disputes with violence, but I believe it is necessary that police use the resources they have to protect public safety.”
