= Jaime Vargas Vargas =

Ecuadorian indigenous leader

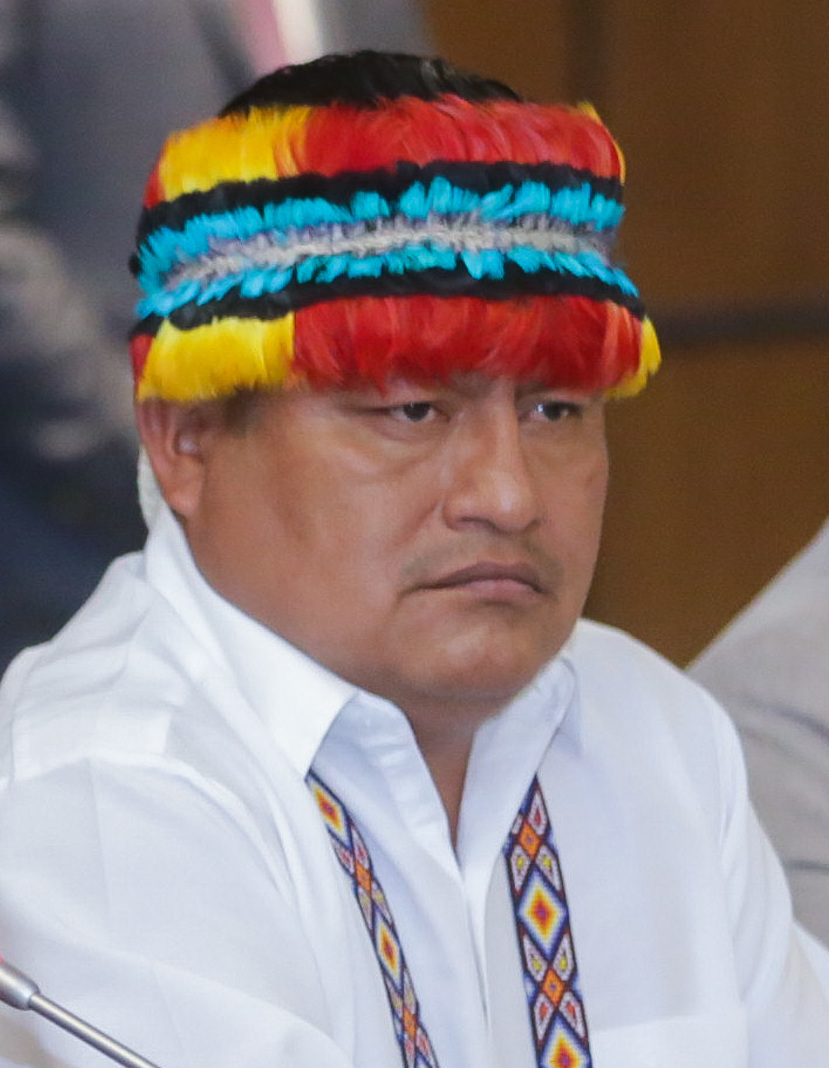
- Born: July 21, 1979 (age 46); Quito, Ecuador

President of the Confederation of Indigenous Nationalities of Ecuador
- In office 16 September 2017 – 12 May 2021
- Preceded by: Jorge Herrera
- Succeeded by: Manuel Castillo

Jaime Vargas Vargas (born 21 July 1979) is an Ecuadorian Achuar indigenous leader. He was the president of the Confederation of Indigenous Nationalities of Ecuador for the 2017–2020 term. He was prominently involved as one of the leaders of the 2019 Ecuadorian protests against austerity measures implemented by the government of Lenín Moreno. His term was extended until 2021, at which point Vargas was deposed for having endorsed Andrés Arauz in the second round of the 2021 Ecuadorian general election.
