= Fernando Martínez Mottola =

Venezuelan politician (died 2025)

Minister of Transport and Communications
- In office 10 January 1992 – 1993
- President: Carlos Andrés Pérez
- Preceded by: Roberto Smith
- Succeeded by: César Quintín Rosales

Personal details
- Died: 26 February 2025
- Occupation: Politician

Fernando Martínez Mottola (died 26 February 2025) was a Venezuelan politician who served as Minister of Transport and Communications during the second presidency of Carlos Andrés Pérez.

== Life and career ==
In 1990, Martínez became the president of CANTV where he directed the privatization of the company, convincing president Carlos Andrés Pérez who until then opposed the idea. He was later appointed Minister of Transport and Communications by Pérez.

In 1991, he declared that in addition to removing La Mancha Negra, a mysterious black substance that oozed from streets in Caracas, he would also remove residents near the Caracas-La Guaira highway as they "were part of the problem creating filters on the road". In 2019, he was one of Juan Guaidó's top advisers and participated as a representative in a negotiation between the government and the opposition in Norway.

=== Publications ===
Miguel Cañas, Paúl Esqueda and Fernando Martínez Mottola, "Situación actual de la Informática y la Microelectrónica en Venezuela" (Present Situation of Informatics and Microelectronics in Venezuela). Published in Telecommunication Review of the Hispano-American Association of Research Centers and Telecommunications Enterprises (AHCIET), Year V, N-27, Nov.-Dec. 1987, pp. 37-46. (In Spanish)

=== Political exile ===
On 26 March 2024, Argentine president Javier Milei confirmed in a press release that Martínez, along with Magalli Meda, Humberto Villalobos, Claudia Macero, Omar González, and Pedro Urruchurtu were being protected as guests in the Argentine ambassador's residence, which underwent a series of two sieges that cut off power. On 29 March, the Argentine government granted political asylum to the group after they formally requested it.

Martínez Mottola died on February 26, 2025.

== See also ==
- List of people who took refuge in a diplomatic mission
