= List of people who took refuge in a diplomatic mission =

Because diplomatic missions, such as embassies, may not be entered by the host country without permission, persons have from time to time taken refuge from a host country's national authorities inside the embassy (or, more rarely, a consulate) of another country.

Name	Reason for seeking refuge	Country (City)	Mission's country	Duration	Resolution
John William, Baron Ripperda, dismissed Prime Minister of Spain	Sought for fraud, embezzlement	Spain (Madrid)	Great Britain	April 13, 1726 – May 25, 1727 (407 days)	Arrested by the Spanish from inside of Ambassador's official residence (in breach of international law)
José Tadeo Monagas, President of Venezuela	March Revolution	Venezuela (Caracas)	France	March 15, 1858 – August 31, 1858 (170 days)	Urrutia Protocol: The Venezuelan government, along with the other signatories (United Kingdom, France, the United States, Brazil, the Netherlands and Spain) agreed to offer safe conduct to Tadeo Monagas, who left to France
José Manuel Balmaceda, President of Chile	Defeated in the Chilean Civil War	Chile (Santiago)	Argentina	August 29, 1891 – September 18, 1891 (20 days)	Committed suicide
Khalid bin Bargash, Sultan of Zanzibar	Defeated in the Anglo-Zanzibar War	Zanzibar (Zanzibar Town)	Germany	August 27, 1896 – October 2, 1896 (36 days)	Evacuated by German Navy to exile in German East Africa
Augusto Roa Bastos, Paraguayan novelist, story-writer and journalist	Political persecution after criticising the military regime	Paraguay (Asunción)	Brazil	1947 – 1947 (40 days)	Negotiated exile in Argentina
Leonardo Argüello Barreto, President of Nicaragua	Ousted by Anastasio Somoza García	Nicaragua (Managua)	Mexico	May 26, 1947 – December 1947 (7 months)	Negotiated exile in Mexico
Víctor Raúl Haya de la Torre, Peruvian political theorist and politician; founder of APRA	APRA was outlawed by the Peruvian military-led dictatorship	Peru (Lima)	Colombia	January 3, 1949 – April 6, 1954 (5 years, 3 months, 3 days)	After heavy international pressure, was finally allowed to leave the country
Jacobo Arbenz Guzmán, President of Guatemala	Ousted by Carlos Castillo Armas	Guatemala (Guatemala City)	Mexico	June 27, 1954 – June 28, 1954 (1 day)	Negotiated exile in Mexico
Imre Nagy, deposed Prime Minister of Hungary	Soviet intervention during Hungarian Revolution of 1956	Hungary (Budapest)	Yugoslavia	November 4, 1956 – November 22, 1956 (18 days)	Received a written guarantee of safe passage, but was nonetheless arrested upon leaving by the new, pro-Soviet government; later executed.
József Mindszenty, Hungarian cardinal	Soviet intervention during Hungarian Revolution of 1956	Hungary (Budapest)	United States	November 4, 1956 – September 28, 1971 (15 years)	Negotiated exile in Austria
Reino Häyhänen, Soviet Lieutenant Colonel	Defection	France (Paris)	United States	November 4, 1956 – May 1957 (6 months)	Moved to the United States
Guillermo Pacanins Acevedo, Governor of the Federal District	1958 Venezuelan coup d'état against the dictatorship of Marcos Pérez Jiménez	Venezuela (Caracas)	Brazil	January 23, 1958 – January 26, 1958 (3 days)	Left to Puerto Rico, then later to mainland United States
Sharif Ali bin al-Hussein, Iraqi prince	coup led by Abd al-Karim Qasim	Iraq (Baghdad)	Saudi Arabia	July 15, 1958 – September 1958 (2 months)	Left to exile in Egypt, later to Lebanon and Britain
Narciso Campos Pontigo, Captain of the Cuban Rural Guard before the Cuban Revolution	Sent to jail after the Cuban revolution	Cuba (Havana)	Brazil	1959 – 1959	Set free by personal order of Raúl Castro; got asylum in the Brazilian embassy, then fled to the United States
Humberto Delgado, General of the Portuguese Air Force and opponent of the Salazar regime	Ran for President in 1958, lost to Américo Tomás in disputed results and was expelled from the military	Portugal (Lisbon)	Brazil	January 12, 1959 – April 20, 1959 (98 days)	Went into exile in Brazil
Olga María Rodríguez Fariñas and her two daughters, Cuban revolutionary who fought in the Cuban Revolution that deposed Fulgencio Batista and led to Fidel Castro's rise to power	Escaping persecution from Fidel Castro, whom Olga and her husband William Alexander Morgan were accused of conspiring against	Cuba (Havana)	Brazil	January 4, 1961 – March 1961 (3 months)	Left the embassy in order to free her husband. Her husband was executed, and she was arrested and imprisoned for 10 years.
José Serra, Brazilian politician; at the time, militant against the Brazilian military dictatorship (1964–1985)	escaping persecution from the Brazilian military government	Brazil (Rio de Janeiro)	Bolivia	April 1964 – July 1964 (3 months)	Was granted safe conduct to leave into exile
Kong Le, Royal Lao Army Major-General	escaped an unsuccessful Coup d'état	Laos (Vientiane)	Indonesia	October 17, 1966 – October 17, 1966 (1 day)	Left into exile to Indonesia
Leon Veillard, Captain in the Haitian Army and one of the leaders of the Tonton Macoute militia	Labeled as a traitor by dictator Papa Doc, who feared he was plotting to overthrow his government and sentenced him and others to die.	Haiti (Port-au-Prince)	Brazil	1967 – 1967	18 colleagues of Veillard were executed, but he received asylum in the Brazilian Embassy and fled to Florida
José Serra, Brazilian politician; at the time, militant against the Brazilian military dictatorship (1964–1985)	escaping persecution from the Brazilian military government	Chile (Santiago)	Italy	1973 – 1973 (6 months)	Was granted safe conduct to leave into exile
Around 800 foreigners and 600 Cambodians, including Dith Pran, Sydney Schanberg, Prince Sisowath Sirik Matak, Princess Mam Manivan Phanivong, and the Cambodian ministers for health and finance.	The French Embassy in Phnom Penh provided temporary refuge following the fall of Phnom Penh.	Cambodia (Phnom Penh)	France	April 17, 1975 – April 30, 1975 (13 days)	Most Cambodians were expelled from the embassy, and many were subsequently executed by the Khmer Rouge. Foreigners and their Cambodian wives were allowed to travel overland to Thailand.
Elena Quinteros, Uruguayan school teacher, detained during the civic-military dictatorship of Uruguay on June 26, 1976 and taken to the torture centre 300 Carlos	Escaped detention	Uruguay (Montevideo)	Venezuela	June 28, 1976 – June 28, 1976	The embassy's personnel attempted to help Quinteros, but she was forcibly taken by Uruguayan policemen and soldiers, and days afterwards she was tortured and killed. The incident prompted Venezuela to break diplomatic relations with Uruguay.
Donald Woods, South African anti-apartheid journalist	Persecution by apartheid government	Lesotho (Maseru)	United Kingdom	January 1978 – January 1978	Fled to London, with the help of the British High Commissioner and government of Lesotho, where he was granted political asylum
The Siberian Seven, Siberian Pentecostals	prevented from emigrating	Soviet Union (Moscow)	United States	June 27, 1978 – June 27, 1983 (5 years (last of them))	Allowed to emigrate to Israel and later the U.S.
Cuban diplomats and civilians, escaped gunfire at the Cuban Embassy	Persecution after the Chilean military coup	Chile (Santiago de Chile)	Sweden	September 11, 1978 – 1978	Safely brought out of Chile. Cuban embassy under Swedish protecting power for 18 years. Ambassador Harald Edelstam later declared persona non grata.
Havana Peruvian embassy crisis	Over 10,000 Cuban citizens	Cuba (Havana)	Peru	April 4, 1980 – 1980	Peru granted diplomatic protection to the Cuban citizens. The incident led to the Mariel boatlift.
Ange-Félix Patassé, Central African opposition leader	opposing Andre Kolingba government	Central African Republic (Bangui)	France	February 27, 1982 – March 3, 1982 (4 days)	Negotiated exile to Togo
Francisco René Bobadilla Palomo, Minister of Agriculture, Livestock and Food under President Fernando Romeo Lucas García	deposed by a military junta headed by Efraín Ríos Montt	Guatemala (Guatemala City)	Brazil	1982 – 1982	Governing junta granted all asylum-seekers safe passage to leave the country
Klaas de Jonge, Dutch anthropologist	Persecution by apartheid government	South Africa (Pretoria)	Netherlands	July 19, 1985 – September 7, 1987 (780 days)	Left as part of a complicated prisoner exchange
Olivia Forsyth, South African apartheid era ex-spy agent	defection to ANC	Angola (Luanda)	United Kingdom	May 2, 1988 – November 16, 1988 (198 days)	Negotiated flight to the United Kingdom
Fang Lizhi and his wife, dissidents in Tiananmen Square protests of 1989	suppression of the Tiananmen Square protests of 1989	China (Beijing)	United States	June 5, 1989 – June 25, 1990 (385 days)	Negotiated flight to the United States
Hou Dejian, dissident in Tiananmen Square protests of 1989	suppression of the Tiananmen Square protests of 1989	China (Beijing)	Australia	June 1989 – August 16, 1989 (72 days)	Negotiated exit and deported back to native Taiwan
Manuel Noriega, military dictator of Panama	United States invasion of Panama	Panama (Panama City)	Holy See	December 24, 1989 – January 3, 1990 (10 days)	Negotiated arrest by United States forces
Michel Aoun, Lebanese Army commander	defeated in Lebanese Civil War	Lebanon (Beirut)	France	October 1990 – August 27, 1991 (10 months)	Left to exile in France
Hailu Yimenu, Derg-era acting prime minister of Ethiopia	Fall of the Derg-regime of Mengistu Haile Mariam	Ethiopia (Addis Ababa)	Italy	May 27, 1991 – 1993 (2 years)	Committed suicide
Tesfaye Gebre Kidan, Derg-era acting president of Ethiopia	Fall of the Derg-regime of Mengistu Haile Mariam	Ethiopia (Addis Ababa)	Italy	May 27, 1991 – June 4, 2004 (13 years, 1 week, 1 day)	Died after an incident at the embassy
Berhanu Bayeh, Derg-era senior Ethiopian official	Fall of the Derg-regime of Mengistu Haile Mariam	Ethiopia (Addis Ababa)	Italy	May 27, 1991 – December 30, 2020 (29 years, 7 months, 3 days)	Sentenced to death in absentia in 2008. Remained in the embassy until granted parole in December 2020.
Addis Tedla	Fall of the Derg-regime of Mengistu Haile Mariam	Ethiopia (Addis Ababa)	Italy	May 27, 1991 – December 30, 2020 (29 years, 7 months, 3 days)	Sentenced to death in absentia in 2008. Remained in the embassy until granted parole in December 2020.
Erich Honecker, General Secretary of the Socialist Unity Party of Germany	Indicted in Germany for the deaths of 192 East Germans who tried to leave the GDR in violation of anti-Republikflucht laws.	Russia (Moscow)	Chile	December 24, 1991 – March 1, 1992 (68 days)	Extradited by the Yeltsin administration back to Germany
Mohammad Najibullah, President of Afghanistan	Afghan Civil War	Afghanistan (Kabul)	United Nations	April 16, 1992 – September 27, 1996 (4 years, 5 months, 11 days)	Tortured and killed by the Taliban
Sylvestre Ntibantunganya, President of Burundi	military coup d'état	Burundi (Bujumbura)	United States	July 23, 1996 – June 1997 (11 months)	Negotiated exit
Abdullah Öcalan, founding member of the Kurdistan Workers' Party	Turkish manhunt	Kenya (Nairobi)	Greece	January 1999 – February 15, 1999 (1 month)	Arrested on the way to the airport and tried and imprisoned in Turkey.
João Bernardo Vieira, President of Guinea-Bissau	Guinea-Bissau Civil War	Guinea-Bissau (Bissau)	Portugal	May 1999 – June 1999 (1 month)	Negotiated exile in Portugal
Henri Konan Bédié, President of Côte d'Ivoire	1999 Ivorian coup d'état	Côte d'Ivoire (Abidjan)	France	December 24, 1999 – December 25, 1999 (1 day)	Briefly took refuge at a French military base, then fled to Togo
Alassane Ouattara, Presidential candidate in Côte d'Ivoire	First Ivorian Civil War	Côte d'Ivoire (Abidjan)	France	September 19, 2002 – November 27, 2002 (69 days)	Negotiated exile in Gabon and France
Henri Konan Bédié, Former president of Côte d'Ivoire	First Ivorian Civil War	Côte d'Ivoire (Abidjan)	Canada	September 2002 – unknown	unknown
44 North Koreans refugees, including children and two former political prisoners, refugees fleeing political repression in North Korea and fearing Chinese collaboration	Political crackdown and impoverishment in North Korea	China (Beijing)	Canada	September 29, 2004 – December 22, 2004 (2 months, 3 weeks, 2 days)	Negotiated transfer with China. First group of 15 people believed to be taken to South Korea, the remaining 29 were sent to an undisclosed, safe third country (likely South Korea).
Lucio Gutiérrez, President of Ecuador	Tried to interfere in the country's Supreme Court amid the Ecuadorian Revolution of 2005; was declared impeached by Congress and replaced by Vice-president Alfredo Palacio	Ecuador (Quito)	Brazil	April 15, 2005 – April 24, 2005 (9 days)	Negotiated exile in Brazil, then went to Peru, then to the United States; returned to Ecuador and disputed the 2009 Ecuadorian general election
Morgan Tsvangirai, candidate for President of Zimbabwe	Violence during the 2008 Zimbabwean presidential election	Zimbabwe (Harare)	Netherlands	June 22, 2008 – June 25, 2008 (3 days)	After negotiations with opponent Robert Mugabe, accepted joining a coalition government and was sworn in as Prime Minister of Zimbabwe
Anwar Ibrahim, de facto Leader of the Opposition Malaysia	Death threats and alleged sodomy charge	Malaysia (Kuala Lumpur)	Turkey	June 29, 2008 – June 30, 2008 (1 day)	Left after assurance of his safety by Malaysian police. Was arrested on 16 July, and released without charges on 17 July. Won the August elections and returned to Parliament as formal leader of the Malaysian opposition.
Andry Rajoelina, deposed mayor of Antananarivo, unilaterally self-proclaimed as president of the Republic of Madagascar on January 31, 2009.	Arrest warrant during the 2009 Malagasy political crisis	Madagascar (Antananarivo)	France	March 6, 2009 – March 16, 2009 (10 days)	Was appointed as president of the caretaker government by Hippolyte Rarison Ramaroson after Marc Ravalomanana resigned and fled the country
Alberto Pizango, Peruvian indigenous leader	Commanded protests against the Peruvian government by indigenous Amazonians who seized control of a natural gas field and a petroleum pipeline	Peru (Lima)	Nicaragua	June 8, 2009 – June 17, 2009 (9 days)	Granted asylum and flown to Nicaragua
Manuel Zelaya, President of Honduras	Declared impeached by Congress for trying to run for reelection, which the Constitution forbade	Honduras (Tegucigalpa)	Brazil	September 21, 2009 – January 28, 2010 (129 days)	Negotiated exile in Dominican Republic
Wang Lijun, former police chief of Chongqing	Conflict with Bo Xilai (Wang Lijun incident)	China (Chengdu)	United States	February 6, 2012 – February 7, 2012 (1 day)	"Left of his own volition" and taken by central government authorities
Amadou Toumani Touré, deposed President of Mali	military coup d'état	Mali (Bamako)	Senegal	April 18, 2012 – August 2012 (4 months)	fled to Senegal
Chen Guangcheng, blind civil rights activist	escape from house arrest	China (Beijing)	United States	April 26, 2012 – May 2, 2012 (6 days)	Left to go to hospital under unclear circumstances. Was later able to go to the U.S with his family.
Roger Pinto, Bolivian Senator; leader of the opposition	Claimed political persecution by Government of President Evo Morales	Bolivia (La Paz)	Brazil	May 28, 2012 – August 23, 2013 (455 days)	Left the embassy in a diplomatic car accompanied by the Brazilian Chargé d'affaires; they drove for 22 hours until arriving in Brazil
Julian Assange, Australian political activist, editor-in-chief of WikiLeaks	To avoid extradition for questioning about alleged rape and sexual abuse in Sweden and to the United States on a now unsealed Grand Jury indictment	United Kingdom (London)	Ecuador	June 19, 2012 – April 11, 2019 (6 years, 9 months, 23 days)	Asylum revoked by Ecuador, arrested by Metropolitan Police
Mohamed Nasheed, former President of the Maldives, who resigned in 2012 claiming to have suffered a coup d'état	Fearing for his life at the hands of the police after ex-Human Rights Minister and a Brigadier General revealed information about assassination plot after Court order issued for police to arrest him	Maldives (Malé)	India	February 13, 2013 – February 23, 2013 (10 days)	Left the Indian High Commission after deal brokered by India
Bosco Ntaganda, former commander in the March 23 Movement	Infighting within the March 23 Movement and possibly vulnerable to Rwandan government	Rwanda (Kigali)	United States	March 18, 2013 – March 22, 2013 (4 days)	Turned over to the International Criminal Court
100 Burundian students	Aggression from the Government of Burundi	Burundi (Bujumbura)	United States	June 25, 2015 – June 25, 2015	Left peacefully at request, relocated to a center run by a religious entity
Ri Ji-u, Kim Uk-il, and Hyon Kwang-song, suspects in assassination of Kim Jong-nam	Investigation into the assassination of Kim Jong-nam	Malaysia (Kuala Lumpur)	North Korea	February 2017 – March 30, 2017 (45 days)	Cleared of wrongdoing by Malaysian police and allowed to return to North Korea
José Fernando Núñez, Justices of the Supreme Tribunal of Justice of Venezuela in exile	Political persecution by the government of Venezuela after their appointment by the National Assembly	Venezuela (Caracas)	Chile	July 29, 2017 – October 19, 2017 (83 days)	Left Venezuela in car to Chile
Luis Manuel Marcano	Political persecution by the government of Venezuela after their appointment by the National Assembly	Venezuela (Caracas)	Chile	July 29, 2017 – October 19, 2017 (83 days)	Left Venezuela in car to Chile
Ramón Linares	Political persecution by the government of Venezuela after their appointment by the National Assembly	Venezuela (Caracas)	Chile	July 29, 2017 – October 19, 2017 (83 days)	Left Venezuela in car to Chile
Elenis del Valle Rodríguez Martínez	Political persecution by the government of Venezuela after their appointment by the National Assembly	Venezuela (Caracas)	Chile	July 29, 2017 – October 19, 2017 (83 days)	Left Venezuela in car to Chile
Zuleima Gonzales	Political persecution by the government of Venezuela after their appointment by the National Assembly	Venezuela (Caracas)	Chile	July 29, 2017 – October 19, 2017 (83 days)	Left Venezuela in car to Chile
Beatriz Ruiz	Political persecution by the government of Venezuela after their appointment by the National Assembly	Venezuela (Caracas)	Chile	July 29, 2017 – October 19, 2017 (83 days)	Left Venezuela in car to Chile
Freddy Guevara, vice-president of the National Assembly of Venezuela and National Coordinator of Popular Will party	Political persecution by the government of Venezuela for leading protests against the regime	Venezuela (Caracas)	Chile	November 4, 2017 – September 9, 2020 (2 years, 10 months, and 5 days)	Left the embassy after being pardoned by Nicolás Maduro. Was afterwards arrested in 2021
Leopoldo López, Opposition leader, founder of Popular Will and Sakharov Prize recipient	Freed from house arrest during the 2019 Venezuelan uprising	Venezuela (Caracas)	Spain	April 30, 2019 – October 25, 2020 (1 year, 5 months, 3 weeks, 4 days)	Fled to Madrid, Spain
Mariela Magallanes, deputies of the National Assembly of Venezuela	Political persecution by the Venezuelan government after the 2019 Venezuelan uprising	Venezuela (Caracas)	Italy	May 8, 2019 – November 30, 2019 (6 months, 3 weeks and 1 day)	Fled to Italy
Américo de Grazia	Political persecution by the Venezuelan government after the 2019 Venezuelan uprising	Venezuela (Caracas)	Italy	May 8, 2019 – November 30, 2019 (6 months, 3 weeks and 1 day)	Fled to Italy
Richard Blanco	Political persecution by the Venezuelan government after the 2019 Venezuelan uprising	Venezuela (Caracas)	Argentina	May 9, 2019 – June 17, 2019 (39 days)	Fled to Colombia
Franco Casella	Political persecution by the Venezuelan government after the 2019 Venezuelan uprising	Venezuela (Caracas)	Mexico	May 14, 2019 – September 20, 2019 (4 months, 6 days)	Fled to Spain
Félix César Navarro	2019 Bolivian political crisis	Bolivia (La Paz)	Mexico	December 23, 2019 – February 1, 2020 (40 days)	Fled to Mexico via Peru
Pedro Damián Dorado	2019 Bolivian political crisis	Bolivia (La Paz)	Mexico	December 23, 2019 – February 1, 2020 (40 days)	Fled to Mexico via Peru
Héctor Arce	2019 Bolivian political crisis	Bolivia (La Paz)	Mexico	December 23, 2019 – November 3, 2020 (10 months, 1 week, and 4 days)	Left embassy after the 2020 Bolivian general election
José Hugo Moldiz	2019 Bolivian political crisis	Bolivia (La Paz)	Mexico	December 23, 2019 – November 3, 2020 (10 months, 1 week, and 4 days)	Left embassy after the 2020 Bolivian general election
Javier Zavaleta	2019 Bolivian political crisis	Bolivia (La Paz)	Mexico	December 23, 2019 – November 4, 2020 (10 months, 1 week, and 5 days)	Left embassy after the 2020 Bolivian general election
Wilma Alanoca	2019 Bolivian political crisis	Bolivia (La Paz)	Mexico	December 23, 2019 – November 5, 2020 (10 months, 1 week, and 6 days)	Left embassy after the 2020 Bolivian general election
Juan Ramón Quintana	2019 Bolivian political crisis	Bolivia (La Paz)	Mexico	December 23, 2019 – November 8, 2020 (10 months, 2 weeks, and 2 days)	Left embassy after the 2020 Bolivian general election
Nicolás Laguna	2019 Bolivian political crisis	Bolivia (La Paz)	Mexico	December 23, 2019 – November 2020 (10 months, 2 weeks, and 4 days)	Left embassy after the 2020 Bolivian general election
Víctor Hugo Vásquez	2019 Bolivian political crisis	Bolivia (La Paz)	Mexico	December 23, 2019 – November 2020 (10 months, 2 weeks, and 4 days)	Left embassy after the 2020 Bolivian general election
Simeon Boikov, pro-Russian influencer	Prosecution and conviction in absentia for assault	Australia (Sydney)	Russia	December 15, 2022 – Ongoing (3 years, 11 months and 1 week)	Ongoing
Jorge Glas, former Vice President of Ecuador	Alleged political persecution in Ecuador after being convicted twice for corruption.	Ecuador (Quito)	Mexico	December 18, 2023 – April 5, 2024 (3 months, 2 weeks and 4 days)	Arrested by the Ecuadorian police from inside the Mexico's embassy (in breach of international law). Mexico broke relations with and sued Ecuador at the International Court of Justice.
Ricardo Martinelli, former president of Panama	Conviction for money laundering	Panama (Panama City)	Nicaragua	February 7, 2024 – May 11, 2025 (1 year, 3 months, 4 days)	Fled to Colombia after being granted safe passage by Panama
Fernando Martínez Mottola	Political persecution by the Venezuelan government following the ban of opposition candidate María Corina Machado in the 2024 Venezuelan presidential election	Venezuela (Caracas)	Argentina	March 25, 2024 – December 19, 2024 (8 months, 3 weeks and 3 days)	Left the embassy and surrendered to Venezuelan authorities
Magalli Meda, Claudia Macero, Humberto Villalobos, Pedro Urruchurtu, and Omar González	Political persecution by the Venezuelan government following the ban of opposition candidate María Corina Machado in the 2024 Venezuelan presidential election	Venezuela (Caracas)	Argentina	May 6, 2025 (1 year, 1 month, 11 days)	Fled to the United States, aided by the United States government
Nadine Heredia, former First Lady of Peru and president of the Peruvian Nationalist Party	Sought for money laundering with a 15-year sentence	Peru (Lima)	Brazil	April 15, 2025 – April 16, 2025 (1 day)	Granted safe passage to Brazil by the Peruvian government
Betssy Chávez, former Prime Minister of Peru	Sought for her involvement in the 2022 coup attempt	Peru (Lima)	Mexico	November 3, 2025 – Ongoing (1 year, 2 weeks and 5 days)	Ongoing

== See also ==
- List of people granted asylum
