= JIAAC =

JIAAC can refer to:

- Junta de Investigación de Accidentes de Aviación Civil (Argentina)
- Junta Investigadora de Accidentes de Aviación Civil (Venezuela)
