= John Pollock (author) =

English Christian writer

John Charles Pollock (1924 – 6 January 2012) was a Christian author. He was the official biographer of Billy Graham and lived with his wife in rural North Devon, England.

== Writings ==
One of his earliest books, A Cambridge Movement, was a history of the Cambridge Inter-Collegiate Christian Union.

One of his best known books is The Apostle, A Life of Paul. This book presents Paul the Apostle and his life as taken from his journeys in Biblical times. The story takes the modern day reader back into history. It portrays Paul as he deals with personal issues while trying to deal with his conversion to Christianity. He wrote extensively on William Wilberforce, including a full-length biography (1977) which has never been out of print. He also wrote about John Newton, composer of the hymn Amazing Grace, and was a board member of the John Newton Project.

His other biographies cover many other renowned Christian individuals, including Hudson and Maria Taylor (1965), L. Nelson Bell (1971), D.L. Moody (1972 & 1983) Lord Shaftesbury (1985), and John Wesley (1989); and groups, such as The Siberian Seven (1979) and The Cambridge Seven (1985). In the 1990s, Pollock also wrote biographies of several Victorian military figures, including Gordon of Khartoum, Lord Kitchener and Henry Havelock.

== Personal life ==
Pollock was born in London and was educated at Trinity College, Cambridge. He taught teaching history and divinity for two years at Wellington College. He was then rector of a country parish until he became a full-time writer in 1958.

John and his wife Anne were keen walkers and did not fuss about bad weather; they were frequently to be seen pacing along the Devon lanes in the rain, seemingly impervious to the cold of Exmoor. This strength of resolve was a hallmark of John Pollock's life which was filled with managing woodlands, writing, gardening, family history, music and travelling.

John Pollock was taken ill on a walking holiday in Scotland and died after a short illness on 6 January 2012.

== Selected works ==
- Pollock, J. C. (1950). Candidate for Truth. London: Church Book Room Press.
- —————— (1953). A Cambridge Movement. London: John Murray.
- —————— (1955). The Cambridge Seven: A Call to Christian Service. London: Inter-Varsity Fellowship.
- Pollock, John (1962). Hudson Taylor and Maria: Pioneers in China. London: Hodder & Stoughton.
- —————— (1963). Moody Without Sankey. London: Hodder & Stoughton.
- —————— (1966). Billy Graham: The Authorised Biography. New York: Graw-Hill.
- —————— (1969). The Apostle: A Life of Paul. New York: Doubleday.
- —————— (1971). Wilberforce. Oxford: Lion Books.
- —————— (1971). A Foreign Devil in China: The Story of Dr. L. Nelson Bell. Minneapolis: World Wide Publications.
- —————— (1972). Moody: A Biographical Portrait of the Pacesetter in Modern Mass Evangelism. Grand Rapids: Zondervan.
- —————— (1973). George Whitefield and The Great Awakening. London: Hodder & Stoughton.
- —————— (1979). The Master: A Life of Jesus. Wheaton: Victor Books.
- —————— (1979). The Siberian Seven. London: Hodder & Stoughton.
- —————— (1981). Amazing Grace: John Newton's Story. New York: HarperCollins.
- —————— (1985). To All the Nations: The Billy Graham Story. San Francisco: Harper & Row.
- —————— (1985). Shaftesbury: The Poor Man's Earl. London: Hodder & Stoughton.
- —————— (1988). A Fistful of Heroes: Christians at the Forefront of Change. London: Marshall Pickering.
- —————— (1989). John Wesley: Servant of God. London: Hodder & Stoughton.
- —————— (1990). On Fire for God: Great Missionary Pioneers. New York: HarperCollins.
- —————— (1993). Gordon: The Man Behind the Legend. London: Constable.
- —————— (1996). The Way to Glory: Major General Sir Henry Havelock, the Christian Soldier. Fearn: Christian Focus.
- —————— (1998). Kitchener: The Road to Omdurman. London: Constable.
- —————— (2001). Kitchener: Comprising The Road to Omdurman and Saviour of the Nation. London: Constable.
- —————— (2007). Abolition! Newton, the ex-Slave Trader, and Wilberforce, the Little Liberator. DayOne Publications.
