= National Institute of Civil Aviation =

- Instituto Nacional de Aeronáutica Civil (INAC)
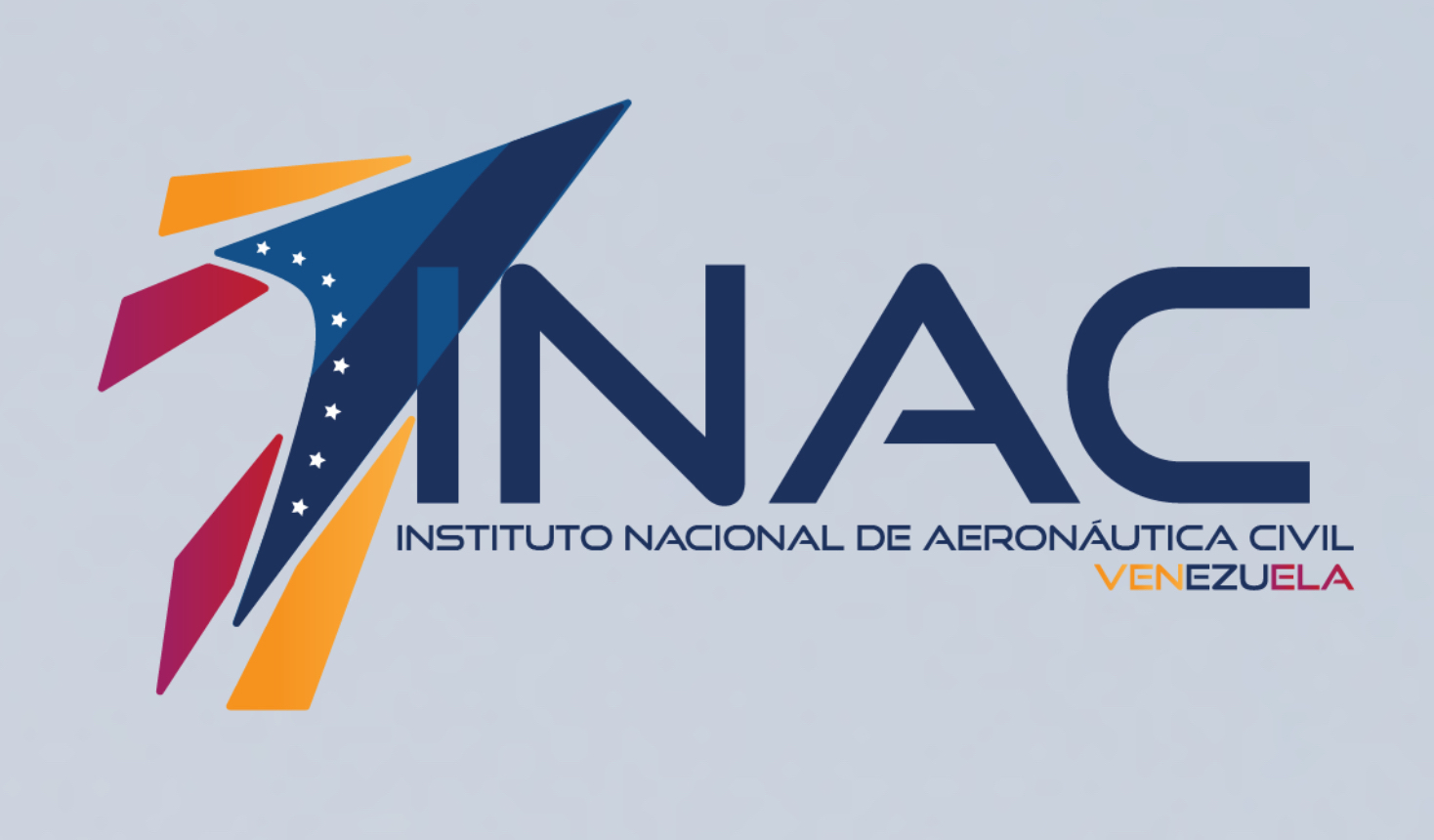

Agency overview
- Formed: 28 September 2001
- Headquarters: Caracas
- Website: https://www.inac.gob.ve

The National Institute of Civil Aviation (spanish: Instituto Nacional de Aeronáutica Civil, INAC) is a Venezuelan civil aviation agency. Its headquarters were in the Torre Británica in Caracas, Miranda, and it had offices in the Edificio Sede IAIM on the property of Simón Bolívar International Airport in Maiquetía, Vargas.

The National Institute of Civil Aviation is responsible for regulating, overseeing, and supervising civil aviation activities, which includes ensuring the fulfillment of the rights and duties of public air transportation service users, maintaining constant surveillance of operational safety and civil aviation protection (including air navigation services), and developing air commerce policies for national airspace.

The investigation of serious aviation accidents and incidents was instead the responsibility of the Junta Investigadora de Accidentes de Aviación Civil (JIAAC), a separate agency.

As of 2012, the departments of the Ministry of Aquatic and Air Transport serve as the civil aviation authority and as the accident investigation authority.

== History ==
INAC was established by Decree No. 1,446 with Fuerza y Rango de Ley. The decree was published in the Gaceta Oficial No. 38.226 on September 28, 2001. Later, it was renamed to Instituto Nacional de Aeronáutica Civil (INAC) on 12 December 2005 in accordance with the Law for the Creation of the National Institute of Civil Aeronautics, published in Official Gazette No. 38,333.
