= Ministry of Aquatic and Air Transport (Venezuela) =

Ministry of the government of Venezuela

The Ministry of Aquatic and Air Transport (Spanish: Ministerio del Poder Popular para Transporte Acuático y Aéreo, "Ministry of the Popular Power of Aquatic and Air Transport", MPPTAA or MTAA) is a ministry of the Government of Venezuela. Its head office is on the 12th floor of the Torre Pequiven in Chacao Municipality, Caracas.

The ministry includes the Directorate General for the Prevention and Investigation of Aeronautical Accidents (Spanish: Dirección General para la Prevención e Investigación de Accidentes Aeronáuticos, DGPIAA), which investigates air accidents and incidents, and the Directorate General for the Prevention and Investigation of Aquatic Accidents (Spanish: Dirección General para la Prevención e Investigación de Accidentes Acuáticos), which investigates marine accidents and incidents.

The ministry also includes Conviasa and Simón Bolívar International Airport.

== History ==
Previously the National Institute of Civil Aviation served as the civil aviation agency, and the Civil Aviation Accident Investigation Board (Spanish: Junta Investigadora de Accidentes de Aviación Civil) investigated air accidents and incidents.

In November 2011 Hugo Chávez, President of Venezuela, announced that the Ministry of Transport and Communications would be divided into two ministries, the MPPTAA and the Ministry of Ground Transport.
