= Ministry of Public Works and Housing (Venezuela) =

Government ministry of Venezuela

The Ministry of Public Works and Housing (Spanish: Ministerio del Poder Popular para las Obras Públicas y Vivienda, MOPVI) was a ministry of the Venezuelan government until June 2010.

The creation of the Ministry of Infrastructure was proposed in 1999. The ministry was formed from the merger of the Ministry of Transport and Communications and the Ministry of Urban Development. It was established as per the Official Gazette of the Bolivarian Republic of Venezuela No. 36,775 of August 30, 1999, and amended by Gazette No. 36,850 of December 14, 1999. It was later amended by Decree No. 3,125 in the Gazette No. 38,024 of September 16, 2004. At that point, the Ministry of Housing and Habitat was created and the Infrastructure ministry lost responsibility for housing. In June 2010 the Venezuelan government divided the agency into two new agencies, the Ministerio del Poder Popular para Transporte y Comunicaciones and the Ministerio del Poder Popular para Vivienda y Hábitat.

The Ministry was known as the Ministerio del Poder Popular para la Infraestructura (Ministry of Popular Power for Infrastructure) from January 2007 to March 2009, and was previously the Ministerio para la Infraestructura (Ministry for Infrastructure, Minfra).

== Ministers ==
Ministros de Obras Públicas y Vivienda de Venezuela
#	Name	Period	President
1	Luis Reyes Reyes	1999	Hugo Chávez
2	Julio Montes	1999	Hugo Chávez
3	Alberto Esqueda	1999 - 2001	Hugo Chávez
4	Liliana Verenzuela	2001 - 2002	Hugo Chávez
5	Diosdado Cabello	2002 - 2003	Hugo Chávez
6	Ramón Carrizales	2003 - 2006	Hugo Chávez
7	José David Cabello	2006 - 2008	Hugo Chávez
8	Isidro Rondón	2008	Hugo Chávez
9	Diosdado Cabello	2008 - 2010	Hugo Chávez
10	Ricardo Molina	2010-2013	Hugo Chávez
11	Manuel Salvador Quevedo Fernández	2013-2017	Nicolás Maduro

== Subordinate agencies ==
Subordinate agencies included:

- Conviasa
- Junta Investigadora de Accidentes de Aviación Civil
- Junta de Investigación de Accidentes Aéreos
