= La Mancha Negra =

Unidentified black substance in Venezuela

La Mancha Negra (The Black Stain) is a mysterious black substance that has oozed from roads in Caracas, Venezuela, first appearing in 1986. Since the appearance of La Mancha Negra, it has caused multiple car accidents and claimed many lives. Determining the cause of the substance has proven difficult and there are still no definitive explanations, despite almost two decades of study and millions of dollars spent identifying it. One report stated that it "was a mixture of used engine oil and highly corrosive brake fluid" but was not able to ascertain its origin. The most accepted theory is that La Mancha Negra is the result of countless leaky, old cars spraying their fluids over the roadway.

== History ==
In 1986, La Mancha Negra first appeared as a smudge 50-yards long. It was noticed by workers as they patched the 30-year-old asphalt on a highway between Caracas and its airport. Initially, concerns for the blob were low but it soon spread. As much as 8 miles of highway were soon covered with the unknown material that contracted and expanded with the weather. It was found to grow when conditions were hot and wet but shrink when it was cold and dry. It seemed to prefer tunnels and the uphill slopes outside the airport. Gummy in texture, the blob rendered the roadway extraordinarily unsafe, causing vehicles to crash into one another or run off the road. In 1991, a group of experts were consulted by President Carlos Andrés Pérez regarding the problem but could not pinpoint the cause of the substance. 1,800 deaths were then attributed to La Mancha Negra in the five years before 1992 and by that time, the stain had spread throughout the city of Caracas.

The Venezuelan government stepped in, stating that it devoted "millions of dollars" to investigating the problem, even consulting experts in the U.S., Canada, and Europe. In 1994, the Ministry of Transport and Communications attempted to wash away La Mancha Negra believing it was paste consisting of oil and dust and even suspended work when it rained believing it would wash away the substance. They tried spraying the stain away with pressurized water, but this did not work. They tried scrubbing it away with detergents to no avail. They even repeatedly scraped away the top layer of the roads, resurfacing it, only to watch La Mancha Negra reappear. Finally, the government poured tons of pulverized limestone over the stain to "dry it up". This seemed to work for a while, but created a different problem; the roads then became so dusty that drivers and local residents complained that the air was unbreathable.

In January 1996, the roads became slick with the substance once more, due to the lack of maintenance, low rainfall and the poor condition of vehicles in Caracas. Special cleaning equipment was brought in from Germany, and the phenomenon seemed to have abated for several years thereafter. However, La Mancha Negra reappeared in 2001 on several roads in Caracas, including Baralt, Nueva Granada, Fuerzas Armadas, Sucre, and Urdaneta Avenues.

== Analysis ==
=== Composition ===
La Mancha Negra has been described as an inch-thick, greasy, black blob that has the consistency of chewed bubble gum, though Venezuelans describe the roads it covers as "slick as ice". A team of the Venezuelan Ministry of Transport and Communications believed La Mancha Negra was composed of dust, oil, and various organic and synthetic materials. In 2001, The Sunday Telegraph stated that one report showed it "was a mixture of used engine oil and highly corrosive brake fluid", but concluded that "After 14 years of study, no one knows what the stuff is, where it comes from, or how to get rid of it".

=== Causes ===
Various theories have been put forward to explain the phenomenon, but no one has established its exact nature.

Originally, some believed that raw sewage from nearby slums was running downhill, under the asphalt, and causing a chemical reaction that broke the roads down. Venezuelan engineer and official Fernando Martínez Mottola stated in 1991 that he would not only remove La Mancha Negra but also the residents near the Caracas-La Guaira highway since "they were part of the problem by creating leaks in the road".

Another theory was that La Mancha Negra was oil that seeped from sub-standard asphalt, with Venezuelans believing someone laid flawed asphalt that would leak oil when temperatures rose. However, the Ministry of Transport and Communications stated that the composition of the asphalt did not have anything to do with the formation of the substance.

The most accepted theory is that La Mancha Negra is the result of countless leaky, old cars spraying their fluids over the roadway. Professor Giannetto, a commissioner of the Ministry of Transport and Communications, believed that La Mancha Negra was an accumulation of dust and oil released from cars that formed a paste on the roads. In 1996, The Wall Street Journal reported that "due to the cheap gasoline prices in the country, Venezuelans would drive dated gas guzzlers, stating 'Locals call the highway "la mancha negra," or the black stain, because it literally shines with the oil drippings of thousands of big cars that labor up an incline into the city each day.' Water-tank trucks periodically spray down the road in vain attempts to wash away some of the oil slick that causes hundreds of accidents a year".

==== Politicization ====
Under the Carlos Andrés Pérez presidency in 1992 during a time of political turmoil, allegations were made that his political opponents were spreading oil on the roads to tarnish his reputation as a leader. In 2001, following Hugo Chávez's Bolivarian Revolution, the substance was used as a political tool once more, with chavista mayor Freddy Bernal stating that the opposition had hired homeless Venezuelans to spread it from plastic bags during the night.
