= Diplomatic mission =

Representatives of one state in another

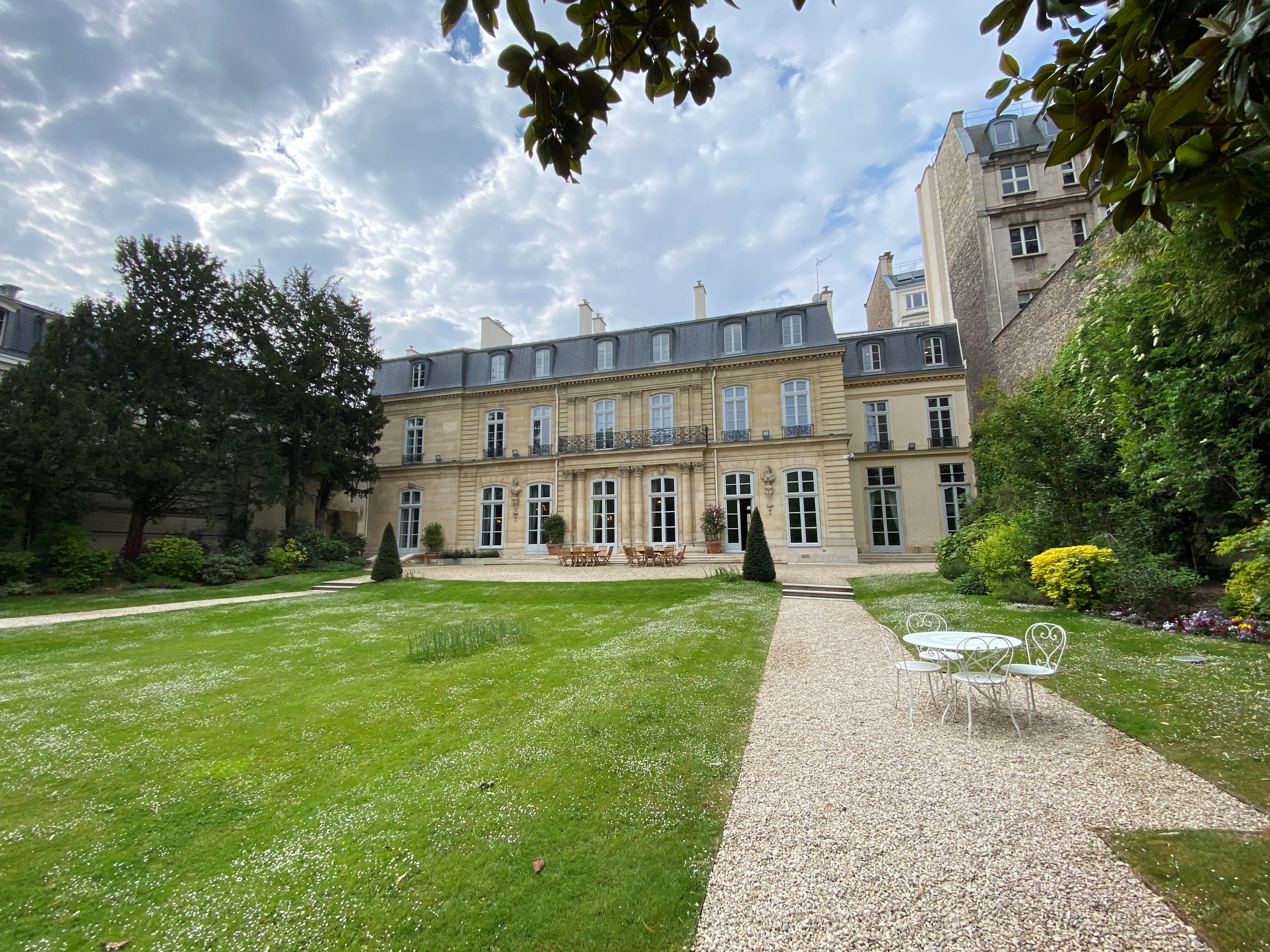
The garden façade of the Hôtel de Besenval in Paris, the Embassy of the Swiss Confederation and the residence of the Swiss ambassador to France.

A diplomatic mission or foreign mission is a group of people from a state or organization present in another state to represent the sending state or organization officially in the receiving or host state. In practice, the phrase usually denotes an embassy or high commission, which is the main office of a country's diplomatic representatives to another country; it is usually, but not necessarily, based in the receiving state's capital city.

Consulates, on the other hand, are smaller diplomatic missions that are normally located in major cities of the receiving state (but can be located in the capital, typically when the sending country has no embassy in the receiving state). In addition to being a diplomatic mission to the country in which it is located, an embassy may also be a non-resident permanent mission to one or more other countries.

The term embassy is sometimes used interchangeably with chancery, the physical office or site of a diplomatic mission. Consequently, the terms "embassy residence" and "embassy office" are used to distinguish between the ambassador's residence and the chancery.

== Terminology ==
A country may have several different types of diplomatic missions in another country.

Consulate
Diplomatic mission that is similar to a consulate general but may not provide a full range of services.
Consulate-general
Diplomatic mission located in a major city, usually other than the capital, that provides a full range of consular services.
Embassy
A diplomatic mission, usually located in the capital of another country, that provides a full range of services, including consular services.
High commission
Embassy of a Commonwealth country located in another Commonwealth nation.
Permanent mission
Diplomatic mission to a major international organization.
Honorary Consul
A single person, not a diplomat or consular officer (civil servant), representing another country on an honorary basis with only a limited range of services. Not necessarily a citizen of the country they represent, but in most cases a citizen of the host country.
Legation
Diplomatic representative office of a lower rank than an embassy. Whereas an embassy was headed by an ambassador, a legation was headed by a minister. Ambassadors outranked ministers and had precedence at official events. Legations were originally the most common form of diplomatic mission, but they fell out of favor after World War II and were upgraded to embassies.

The head of an embassy is known as an ambassador or high commissioner. The term embassy is commonly used also as a section of a building in which the work of the diplomatic mission is carried out, but strictly speaking, it is the diplomatic delegation itself that is the embassy, while the office space and the diplomatic work done is called the chancery. Therefore, the embassy operates in the chancery.

The members of a diplomatic mission can reside within or outside the building that holds the mission's chancery, and their private residences enjoy the same rights as the premises of the mission as regards inviolability and protection. All missions to the United Nations are known simply as permanent missions, while EU member states' missions to the European Union are known as permanent representations, and the head of such a mission is typically both a permanent representative and an ambassador. European Union missions abroad are known as EU delegations. Some countries have a more particular nomenclature for their missions and staff: a Vatican mission is headed by a nuncio (Latin for "envoy") and consequently known as an apostolic nunciature. Under the rule of Muammar Gaddafi, Libya's missions used the name people's bureau, headed by a secretary.

Missions between Commonwealth countries are known as high commissions, and their heads are high commissioners. Generally speaking, ambassadors and high commissioners are regarded as equivalent in status and function, and embassies and high commissions are both deemed to be diplomatic missions. In the past, a diplomatic mission headed by a lower-ranking official (an envoy or minister resident) was known as a legation. Since the ranks of envoy and minister resident are effectively obsolete, the designation of legation is no longer among the diplomatic ranks used in diplomacy and international relations.

A consulate is similar to, but not the same as, a diplomatic office, with a focus on dealing with individual persons and businesses, as defined by the Vienna Convention on Consular Relations. A consulate or consulate general is generally a representative of the embassy in locales outside of the capital city. For instance, the Philippines has its embassy to the United States in the latter's capital, Washington, D.C., but also maintains seven consulates-general in major US cities. The person in charge of a consulate or consulate-general is known as a consul or consul-general, respectively. Similar services may also be provided at the embassy (to serve the region of the capital) in what is normally called a consular section.

In cases of dispute, it is common for a country to recall its head of mission as a sign of its displeasure. This is less drastic than cutting diplomatic relations completely, and the mission will continue operating more or less normally, but it will now be headed by a chargé d'affaires (usually the deputy chief of mission) who may have limited powers. A chargé d'affaires ad interim also heads the mission during the interim between the end of one chief of mission's term and the beginning of another.

== Extraterritoriality ==
Contrary to popular belief, diplomatic missions sometimes do not enjoy full extraterritorial status and are generally not sovereign territory of the represented state. The sending state can give embassies sovereign status, but this only happens with a minority of countries. Rather, the premises of an embassy remain under the jurisdiction of the host state while being afforded special privileges (such as immunity from most local laws) by the Vienna Convention on Diplomatic Relations. Diplomats themselves still retain full diplomatic immunity, and (as an adherent to the Vienna Convention) the authorities of the host country may not enter the premises of the mission (which means the head of mission's residence) without permission of the represented country. However consent may be assumed in cases of fire or other disaster requiring prompt protective action. International rules designate an attack on an embassy as an attack on the country it represents. The term 'extraterritoriality' is often applied to diplomatic missions, but normally only in this broader sense.

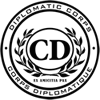
Seal of a diplomatic corps.

As the host country's authorities may not enter the representing country's embassy without permission, embassies are sometimes used by refugees escaping from either the host country or a third country. For example, North Korean nationals, who would be arrested and deported from China upon discovery, have sought sanctuary at various third-country embassies in China. Once inside the embassy, diplomatic channels can be used to solve the issue and send the refugees to another country. See the list of people who took refuge in a diplomatic mission for a list of some notable cases.

Notable violations of embassy extraterritoriality include repeated invasions of the British Embassy in Beijing (1967), the hostage crisis at the American embassy in Tehran, Iran (1979–1981), and the hostage crisis at the Japanese ambassador's residence in Lima, Peru (1996–1997).

== Role ==
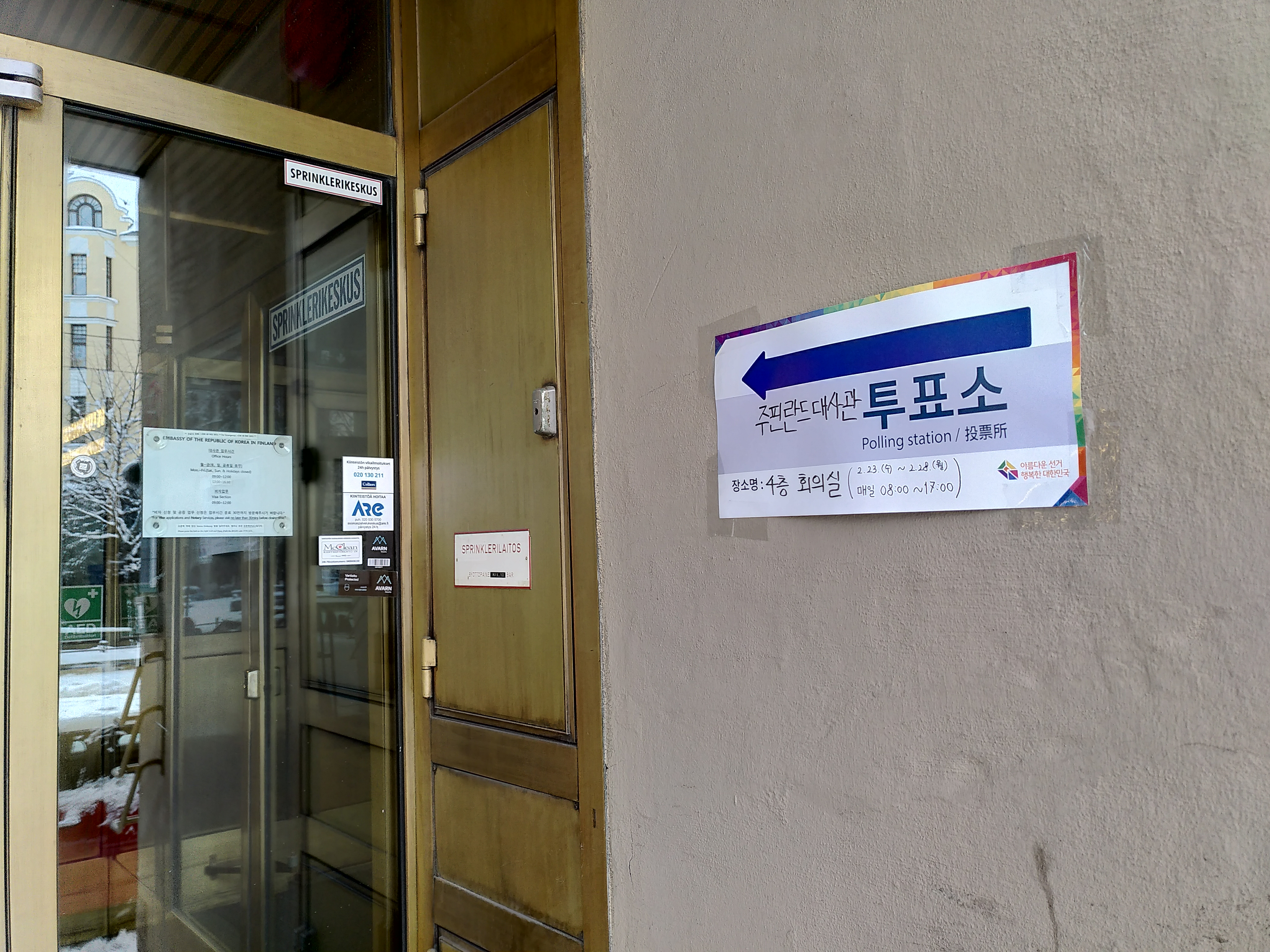
The Embassy of the Republic of Korea in Helsinki functioning as a polling station.

The basic role of a diplomatic mission is to represent and safeguard the interests of the home country and its citizens in the host country. According to the 1961 Vienna Convention on Diplomatic Relations, which establishes the framework of diplomacy among sovereign states:

The functions of a diplomatic mission consist, inter alia, in representing the sending State in the receiving State; protecting in the receiving State the interests of the sending State and of its nationals, within the limits permitted by international law; negotiating with the Government of the receiving State; ascertaining by all lawful means conditions and developments in the receiving State, and reporting thereon to the Government of the sending State; promoting friendly relations between the sending State and the receiving State, and developing their economic, cultural and scientific relations.

Diplomatic missions between members of the Commonwealth of Nations are not called embassies, but high commissions, for Commonwealth nations share a special diplomatic relationship. It is generally expected that an embassy of a Commonwealth country in a non-Commonwealth country will do its best to provide diplomatic services to citizens from other Commonwealth countries if the citizens' country does not have an embassy in that country. Canadian and Australian nationals enjoy even greater cooperation between their respective consular services, as outlined in the Canada-Australia Consular Services Sharing Agreement. The same kind of procedure is also followed multilaterally by the member states of the European Union (EU). European citizens in need of consular help in a country without diplomatic or consular representation of their own country may turn to any consular or diplomatic mission of another EU member state (art. 23 TFEU).

== Multiple missions in a city ==
Some cities may host more than one mission from the same country.

In Rome, many states maintain separate missions to both Italy and the Holy See. It is not customary for these missions to share premises or personnel. At present, only Iraq and the United States' embassies to Italy each share premises with their respective missions to the Holy See. Nevertheless, separate ambassadors are appointed: one servicing U.S. relations with Italy, another servicing the U.S.'s relations with the Holy See — one servicing Iraq's relations with Italy, another servicing Iraq's relations to the Holy See. In the case of the UN's Food Agencies, the sending country's ambassador to the Italian Republic is usually accredited ex officio as permanent representative. The United States is an outlier, maintaining a separate, designated mission to the UN agencies, led by its own ambassador, but is located in the same compound that houses the U.S.'s embassies to Italy and the Holy See.

Several cities host both embassies/consulates and permanent representatives to international organizations, such as New York City (United Nations), Washington, D.C. (Organization of American States), Jakarta (ASEAN) and Brussels (European Union and North Atlantic Treaty Organization). In some cases, an embassy or consulate is divided between multiple locations in the same city. For example, the Bangladeshi Deputy High Commission in Kolkata has two locations: one at Park Circus and another, opened later, at Mirza Ghalib Street, to reduce overcrowding.

== Non-diplomatic offices ==
Governments of states not recognized by the receiving state and of territories that make no claim to be sovereign states may set up offices abroad that do not have official diplomatic status as defined by the Vienna Convention. Examples are the Taipei Economic and Cultural Representative Offices that represent the government of the Republic of China; Somaliland's Representative Offices in London, Addis Ababa, Rome, Taipei, and Washington, D.C.; the Hong Kong and Macau economic and trade offices that represent the governments of those two territories. Such offices assume some of the non-diplomatic functions of diplomatic posts, such as promoting trade interests and providing assistance to their citizens and residents. They are nevertheless not diplomatic missions; their personnel are not diplomats and do not have diplomatic visas, although there may be legislation providing for personal immunities and tax privileges, as in the case of the Hong Kong offices in London and Toronto or the Macau office in Lisbon, for example.

== Gallery ==
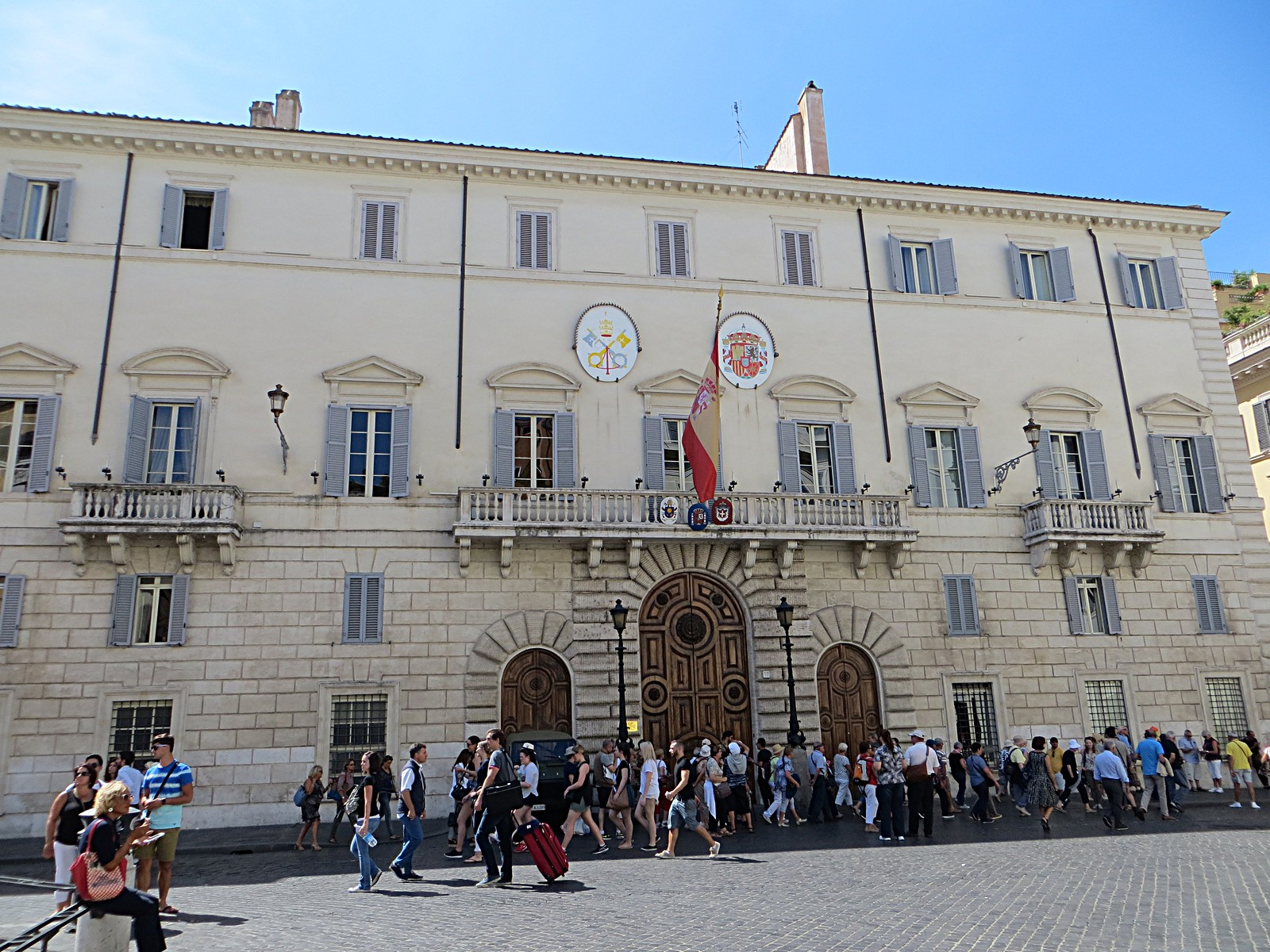
Spanish embassy to the Holy See and the Sovereign Military Order of Malta in Rome, Italy.

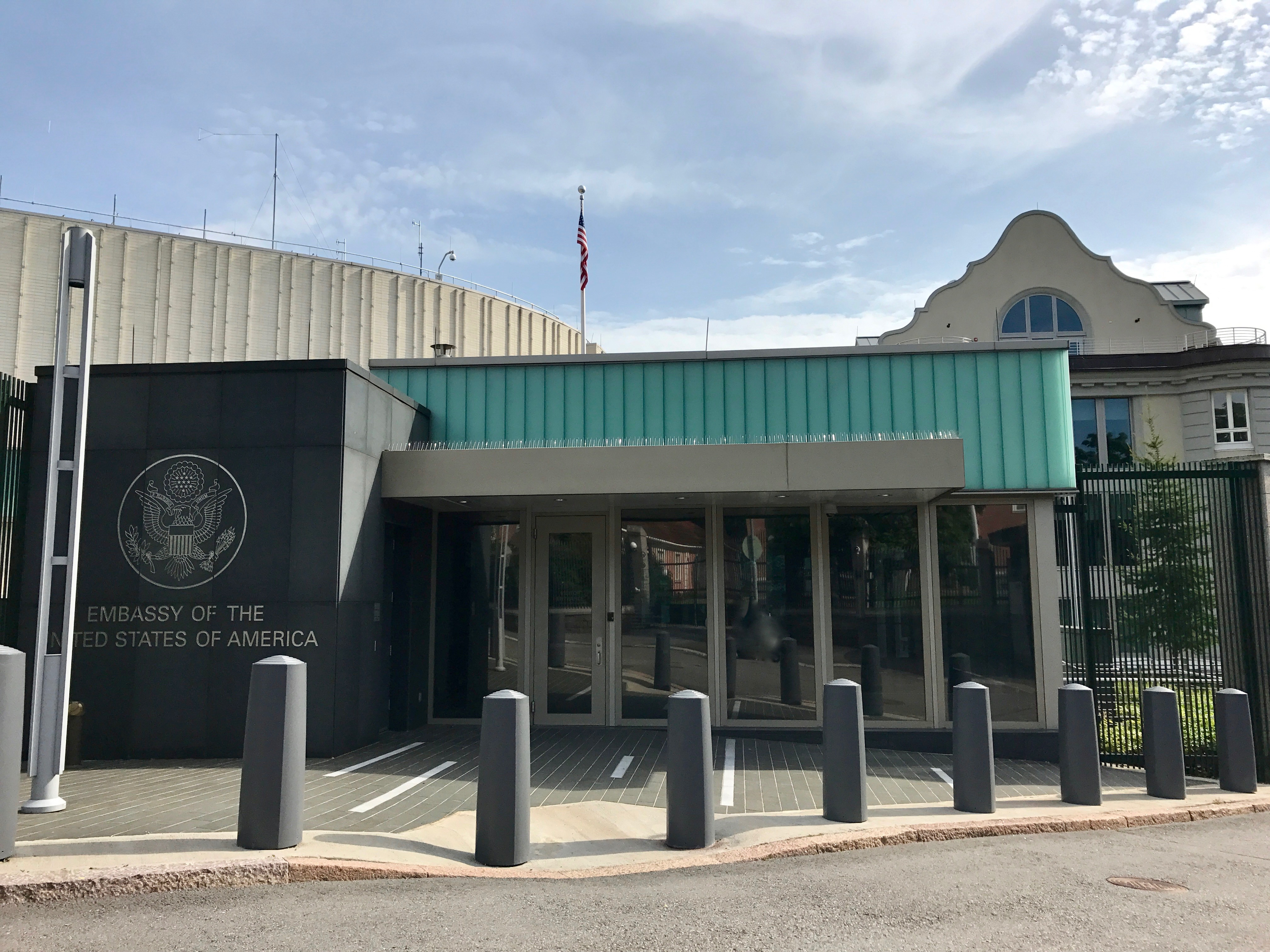
Embassy of the United States in Helsinki, Finland.

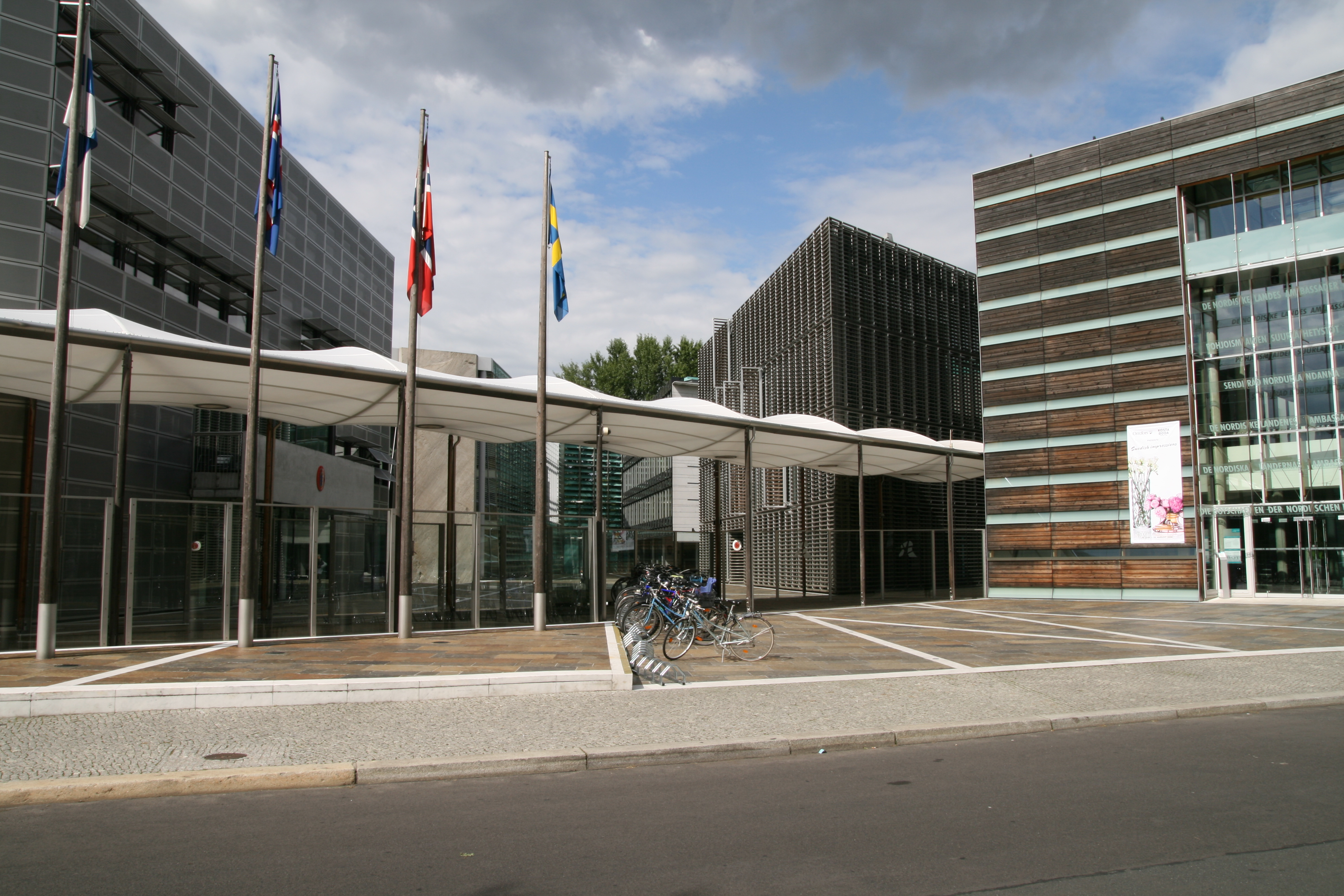
The embassies of Denmark, Finland, Iceland, Norway, and Sweden in a joint compound of Nordic Embassies in Berlin, Germany.

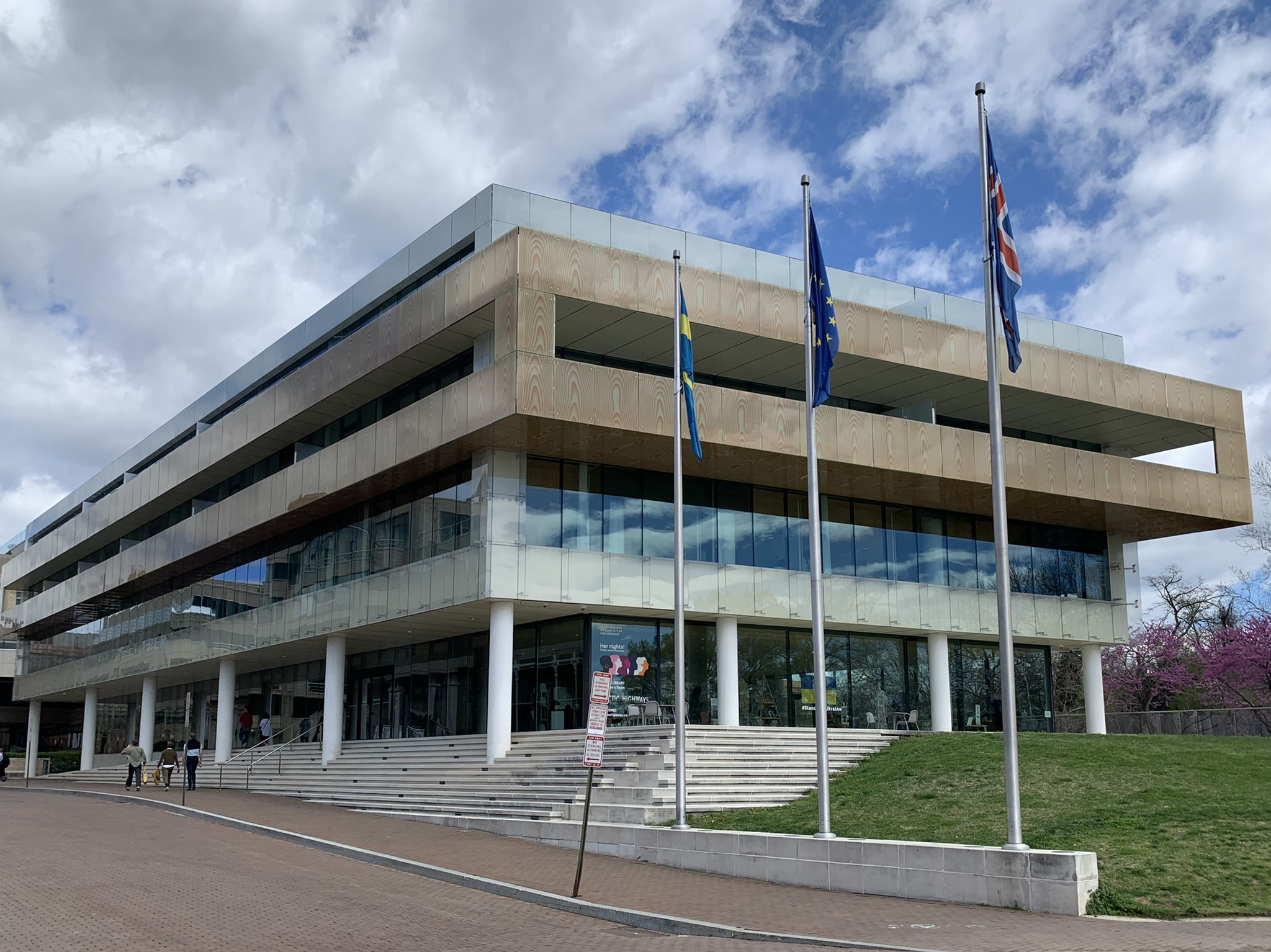
House of Sweden featuring Swedish as well as Icelandic and Liechtenstein diplomatic missions to the United States.

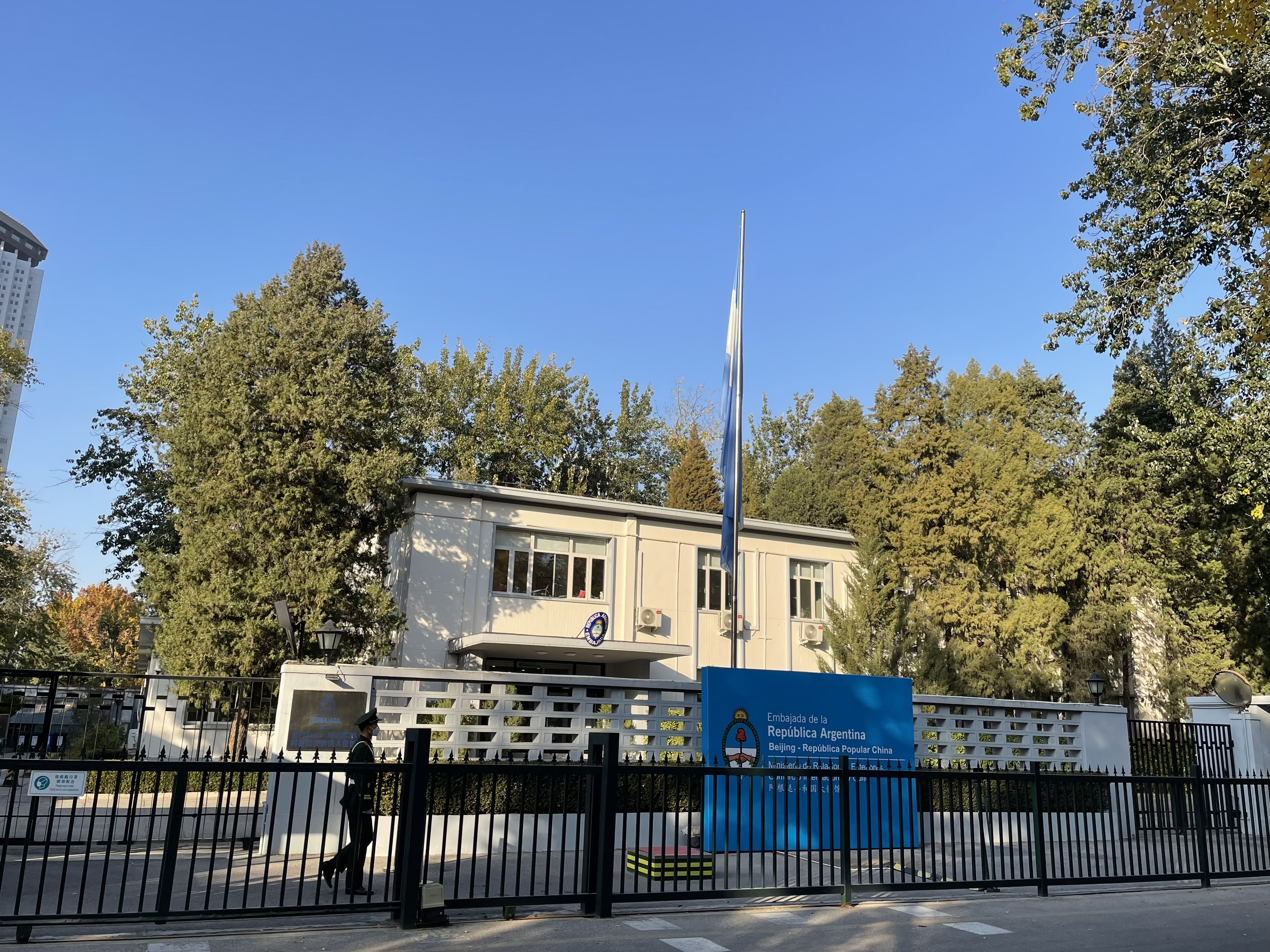
Embassy of Argentina, Beijing, China.

== See also ==
- Culinary diplomacy
- Chancery
- Diplomacy
- Embassy chapel
- Embassy Row, Washington, D.C.
- Global relations
- List of attacks on diplomatic missions
- List of countries by number of diplomatic missions
- Lists of diplomatic missions
- List of people who took refuge in a diplomatic mission
- Paradiplomacy
