= Ministry of Ground Transport (Venezuela) =

Government ministry of Venezuela

The Ministry of Ground Transport (Ministerio del Poder Popular para Transporte Terrestre, MPPTT, "Ministry of the Popular Power of Ground Transport") is a government ministry of Venezuela. The ministry has its headquarters in the Torre MTT in Chacao, Caracas, Miranda.

Agencies of the ministry include the railways agency Instituto de Ferrocarriles del Estado and various metro systems including the Caracas Metro.

== History ==
In November 2011 Hugo Chávez, President of Venezuela, announced that the Ministry of Transport and Communications would be divided into two ministries, the Ministry of Aquatic and Air Transport and the Ministry of Ground Transport.
