= Siberian Seven =

The Siberian Seven refers to seven out of twenty‑nine members of two families of persecuted Pentecostals in the Soviet Union who took up residency at the U.S. Embassy in Moscow on June 27, 1978. These seven members represented the Vashchenko and Chmykhalov families, both originally from Chernogorsk, Siberia. The seven stayed at the embassy for five years, until being granted exit visas and permission to emigrate on June 26, 1983, before all 29 members were allowed to leave to Israel on a tourist visa. Sixteen members of the families eventually settled in the United States.

== See also ==
- List of people who took refuge in a diplomatic mission
