= Paul Esqueda =

American engineering and business academic

- Born: Paul D. Esqueda
- Citizenship: Venezuelan, American
- Occupations: Engineer, academic administrator
- Spouse: Mireya Esqueda
- Parent(s): Jose Esqueda (father); Elba Isabel Esqueda (mother)

Academic background
- Education: University of North London (Eng.); Pennsylvania State University (M.Sc., Ph.D.)

Academic work
- Discipline: Engineering
- Institutions: Penn State Berks; Institute for Advanced Studies in Administration (IESA); Engineering Research Institute (Caracas); Venezuelan Institute of Scientific Research (IVIC)

Paul D. Esqueda (born 26 June 1948) is a Venezuelan-American engineer and academic administrator. He is a Professor Emeritus of Engineering at Penn State Berks and a member of the International Faculty at IESA, Caracas.His research initially focused on solid state devices and integrated circuits and later on shifted to project management, negotiations, and operations management.

== Education ==
Esqueda earned an Engineering Degree from the University of North London, England. He received both his M.Sc. and Ph.D. in Electrical Engineering from Penn State University.

== Early life and Education ==
Esqueda attended elementary school at Grupo Escolar República del Paraguay in Los Teques. He continued to middle school at Escuela 24 de Julio in Catia, Caracas. He was encouraged by his parents to enroll in vocational school at Escuela Tecnica Industrial in Caracas where he completed high school and earned his diploma as an electronic technician. While at VoTech he was recruited by the Venezuelan Institute of Scientific Research (IVIC) as part of the technical staff to provide support to the operations of the Nuclear Reactor RV-1. During his first year at IVIC, Esqueda was awarded a scholarship to continue engineering studies at the Polytechnic of North London, England. Esqueda earned an Engineering Degree from the University of North London, England. He subsequently received a Master of Science degree and a Doctor of Philosophy degree in Electrical engineering from Pennsylvania State University. He completed his doctorate in 1978.

== Career ==
=== Engineering research ===
Esqueda worked at the Venezuelan Institute for Scientific Research, where he held research and laboratory leadership positions in electrical engineering and technology. His research included semiconductor devices and electronic materials, and he co-authored technical papers published in scientific journals.

From 1984 to 1993, he served as president and founder of the Institute for Engineering Research in Caracas, Venezuela. He also served on the board of directors of the International Institute for Advanced Studies during the early 1990s.

=== Academic administration ===
Esqueda joined the faculty of the Institute for Advanced Studies in Administration in Caracas and served as dean of the institution from 1997 to 2001.

In 2003, Esqueda joined Penn State Berks as head of its Division of Engineering, Business and Computing, a position he held until 2006. He subsequently served as senior associate dean for academic affairs and professor of engineering from 2006 to 2020.

From 2003 to 2008, he served as a consultant to the European Union on its Latin American Scholarship Program.

Esqueda served as president and director of Unikemia, a professional and executive development organization operating in Europe and Latin America, from 2015 to 2020.

He is a Professor Emeritus at Penn State University, a member ofthe International Faculty at IESA, a member of the faculty team delivering NASA’s Leadership Development Program in Science and Engineering and has taught negotiation in IESA’s Advanced Management Program PAG for the past five years.

== Selected publications ==
- "Developing a global logistic hub: a teaching case in multiparty collaboration and negotiation", Journal of International Procurement Management, Vol. 5, No. 4, 2012.
- Oswaldo Lorenzo, Paul Esqueda and Janelle Larson. "Safety and Ethics in the Global Workplace: Asymmetries in Culture and Infrastructure", Journal of Business Ethics, Vol. 92, Issue 1, 2010, p. 87.
- Paul Esqueda and Mary Lou D’Allegro. "High Marks", Quality Progress, Vol. 43, No. 5, p. 28, May 2010.
- Rich Young and Paul Esqueda “Supply Chain Vulnerability: Considerations for the Case of Latin America” No. 34, Academia (the Latin American Business Review) of the Latin American Council of Management Schools (CLADEA), 2005.
- Paul Esqueda and Denise Ogden “Adjusting International Agreements in Light of Change: a Case of an Assisted Renegotiation,” Journal of the International Academy for Case Studies, Volume 16, Number 1, 2010 (Complete Case) and Volume 16, Number 2, 2010 (Instructors’ Notes)
- Paul Esqueda and Denise Ogden “Power Play in a Buyer-Seller Agreement: a Case of Extreme Competition” Journal of the International Academy for Case Studies, Volume 11, Number 1, 2005(Complete Case), Volume 11, Number 2, 2005 (Instructors’ Notes).
- B. Sanchez, C. Baena and Paul Esqueda “Competitiveness of the Venezuelan Oil Industry” published by the Economic Commission for Latin America and the Caribbean (ECLAC), No. 71 of its Productive Development Series, October 2000. (In Spanish)
- Paul Esqueda, M. Octavio and R. Callarotti, “Inductive Contactless Measurement of the Conductivity of Thin Films", Thin Solid Films, Vol. 89, No. 1, pp. 33-38, 1982.
- Paul Esqueda and M. B. Das, “Dependence of Minority Carrier Bulk Generation in Silicon MOS Structures on HCl Concentration in the Oxidizing Ambient”, Solid State Electronics, vol. 23, pp. 741–746, Jul. 1980.
- Paul Esqueda and M. B. Das, “Characterization of Surface States in HCl-Grown Oxides Using MOS Transient Currents”, Solid State Electronics, Vol. 23, pp. 365–375, April 1980.
- M. B. Das y Paul Esqueda, “A Two Layer Microwave JFET Structure for Improved Characteristics”, IEEE Trans. on Electron Devices, ED-24, 757, 1977.
- Paul Esqueda y H. K. Henish, “Threshold Switching Characteristics”, Journal of Non-Crystalline Solids, 22, 97, 1976.

== See also ==
- April 2026 Venezuela Update with Dr. Paul Esqueda
