= Siege of the Argentine Embassy and ambassador's residence in Venezuela =

2024 diplomatic incident between Argentina and Venezuela

Siege of the Argentine Embassy in Venezuela
- Part of 2024 Venezuelan political crisis
| Date | 31 July – 1 September 2024; 7 – 8 September 2024; 23 November 2024 – 6 May 2025 |
| Location | Caracas, Venezuela |
| Result | Release and exile of the Venezuelan opposition staff members: Venezuelan government unilaterally revokes Brazil's permission to guard the Argentine embassy, Brazil's foreign ministry rejects the revocation.; Many countries in the Americas condemn the actions of Nicolás Maduro's government.; Venezuelan security forces temporarily withdrawn. |

Parties involved
| Argentina | Venezuela |

Commanders and leaders
| Javier Milei; Patricia Bullrich; Diana Mondino (until October 31st); Gerardo Werthein; Edmundo González; María Corina Machado | Nicolás Maduro; Diosdado Cabello; Yván Gil |

The siege of the Argentine Embassy in Venezuela was a blockade of the Argentine Embassy and ambassador's residence in Caracas. Movement into and out of the compound was restricted between July 30 to September 1, 2024, on September 7–8, 2024, and from November 23, 2024, to May 6, 2025. The siege was ordered by the government of Nicolás Maduro and is part of the Venezuelan post-electoral crisis. The cause of the siege was the entry of indicted Venezuelan opposition staff members into the ambassador's residence, where they are taking shelter.

The events have received condemnation from Brazil, Chile, Costa Rica, the United States, Canada, Guatemala, Paraguay, Peru and Uruguay, who expressed solidarity with Argentina.

== Background ==
Friction arose between Argentina's libertarian government and Venezuela's socialist government after Argentine president Javier Milei became a leader of those alleging that Maduro stole the July 2024 presidential election.

In March 2024, after opposition candidate María Corina Machado's campaign manager Magalli Meda was indicted in Venezuela for allegedly propagating destabilising political violence, she and five others sought refuge and political asylum at the Argentine Embassy in Venezuela and were permitted to stay at the ambassador's residence. Shortly after, electricity was cut to the building.

On July 28, 2024, presidential elections were held in Venezuela, to elect a new president for a constitutional term of 6 years. The presidential elections were neither free nor fair, and took place in a context in which the government of Nicolás Maduro controls the government and represses political opposition.

On the same day, the National Electoral Council declared Nicolás Maduro the winner with 51.95% of the votes, while Edmundo Gonzales would come in second with 43.18% of the votes. Both María Corina Machado and Edmundo González rejected the NEC results and claimed victory. González, in an act accompanied by Machado, said: "Venezuelans and the entire world know what happened... Our fight continues and we will not rest until the will of the Venezuelan people is respected." Meanwhile, Venezuelans opposed to Nicolás Maduro went out to protest in several localities of the country.

== Sieges ==
On July 30, Pedro Urruchurtu, a political asylum seeker, reported a siege was taking place. Since the embassy accepted six political dissidents linked to opposition leader María Corina Machado as asylum seekers, the embassy's electricity supply was cut off.

In August 2024, Venezuela's top prosecutor (Tarek William Saab) began a criminal investigation against Venezuelan opposition leaders Edmundo González and María Corina Machado for calling on troops to oppose Maduro. On September 2, an arrest warrant was issued for González for the alleged crimes of "usurpation of functions, falsification of public documents, instigation to disobey the law, conspiracy and association". After the election, González had sought refuge secretly in the Dutch Embassy through September 5, after which he spent several days in the Spanish embassy in Caracas, was granted asylum, and left on a Spanish Armed Forces flight on September 7, 2024.

When Venezuelan President Nicolás Maduro announced his decision to "immediately and unilaterally" revoke Brazil's permission to guard the embassy, which it had held since August 1, "patrols by Venezuelan intelligence services and security forces surrounding the official building in Caracas" were again reported, this time in a formal complaint by the Argentine Foreign Ministry.

On September 8, 2024, shortly after presidential candidate Edmundo González arrived in Spain, electricity was restored and the second siege ended.

On November 23, 2024, Pedro Urruchurtu, a political asylum seeker at the embassy, reported shortly before 7:00 p.m. VET that hooded officers from the Directorate of Strategic and Tactical Actions of the Bolivarian National Police Corps (DAET) and the Bolivarian National Intelligence Service had appeared in the vicinity of the Argentine embassy in Caracas with long guns and had surrounded the diplomatic headquarters. After more than 5 hours of siege, Urruchurtu confirmed that the security agents, as part of their siege, had just cut off the electricity service to the ambassador's residence. He also confirmed that the agents had cut off access on the street, and that drones that "block the mobile signal" had flown over.

=== Extraction of asylum seekers ===
As of February 2025, the siege of the Argentine embassy in Caracas remains unresolved, with at least five political asylum seekers, Magalli Meda, Pedro Urruchurtu, Omar González, Claudia Macero, and Humberto Villalobos, are still trapped inside. Reports indicate that the Venezuelan government has maintained a heavy security presence around the embassy, restricting access to food, water, and medical supplies.

On February 18, 2025, sources confirmed that the power generator used by the asylum seekers had failed, leaving them completely without electricity, water, or communication. Diplomatic efforts by Argentina, Brazil, Canada, and the European Union have called for Venezuela to allow safe passage for those inside, but no agreement has been reached. The United Nations High Commissioner for Refugees (UNHCR) has expressed concern over the deteriorating conditions and urged the Venezuelan government to comply with international protections for asylum seekers.

Meanwhile, opposition leaders and international human rights organizations have condemned the prolonged siege, labeling it a violation of diplomatic norms and human rights. Negotiations between Venezuelan authorities and foreign diplomats are ongoing, but there is growing fear that the situation could escalate further if no resolution is reached soon.

On May 6, 2025, United States Secretary of State Marco Rubio confirmed that the asylum seekers who were at the Argentine embassy in Venezuela were released and are in US territory.

=== United States intervention in Venezuela ===
After the 2026 United States intervention in Venezuela, the government of Brazil announced on 11 January 2026 to hand back the representation to Argentina.

Argentine president Javier Milei indicated that the embassy will remain closed until all Argentine political prisoners held in Venezuela are released.

== See also ==
- 2024 Venezuelan political crisis
- Argentina-Venezuela relations
