= Ministry of Transport and Communications (Venezuela) =

Government ministry of Venezuela

The Ministry of Transport and Communications (Spanish: Ministerio del Poder Popular para el Transporte y Comunicaciones "Ministry of Popular Power for Transportation and Communications", MTC) of Venezuela was created in June 2010, to cover transport and communications in Venezuela. Its creation saw the disappearance of the Ministry of Public Works and Housing (Ministerio del Poder Popular para las Obras Públicas y Vivienda), split into this ministry and the Ministerio del Poder Popular para Vivienda y Hábitat. Its headquarters were in the Torre MTC in Chacao, Caracas, Miranda. In November 2011 Hugo Chávez, President of Venezuela, announced that the MTC would be divided into two ministries, the Ministry of Aquatic and Air Transport and the Ministry of Ground Transport.

== Responsibilities ==
Among other responsibilities the ministry covered the air accident investigation body (Junta Investigadora de Accidentes de Aviación Civil), Simón Bolívar International Airport (Venezuela) and the airline Conviasa; and the railways agency Instituto de Ferrocarriles del Estado and various metro systems including the Caracas Metro. Conviasa, the airport, and the new air accident investigation body are now under the Ministry of Aquatic and Air Transport (Ministerio del Poder Popular para Transporte Acuático y Aéreo).

== Ministers ==
Ministros de Transporte y Comunicaciones de Venezuela
#	Name	Period	President
1	José Cecilio Castro	1887 - 1888	Hermógenes López
1	Víctor Rodríguez	1899	Cipriano Castro
2	Juan Otáñez Maucó	1899 - 1902	Cipriano Castro
3	Rafael María Carabaño	1902 - 1903	Cipriano Castro
4	Ricardo Castillo Chapellín	1903	Cipriano Castro
5	Alejandro Rivas Vásquez	1903 - 1904	Cipriano Castro
6	Ricardo Castillo Chapellín	1904 - 1906	Cipriano Castro
7	Luis Mata Illas	1906	Cipriano Castro
8	Juan Casanova	1906 - 1908	Cipriano Castro
1	Antonio Díaz	1935 - 1936	Eleazar López Contreras
2	Tomás Pacaninis	1936 - 1938	Eleazar López Contreras
3	Enrique Jorge Aguerrevere	1938 - 1941	Eleazar López Contreras
1	Manuel Silveira	1941 - 1945	Isaías Medina Angarita
1	Luis Lander	1945 - 1946	Rómulo Betancourt
2	Eduardo Mier y Terán	1946 - 1947	Rómulo Betancourt
3	Edgar Pardo Stolk	1947 - 1948	Rómulo Betancourt
1	Edgar Pardo Stolk	1948	Rómulo Gallegos
1	Luis Eduardo Chataing	1952 - 1953	Marcos Pérez Jiménez
2	Julio Bacalao Lara	1953 - 1956	Marcos Pérez Jiménez
3	Oscar Rodríguez Gragirena	1956 - 1958	Marcos Pérez Jiménez
4	Oscar Mazzei	1958	Marcos Pérez Jiménez
1	Santiago Hernández Ron	1959 - 1960	Rómulo Betancourt
2	Rafael De León Álvarez	1960 - 1962	Rómulo Betancourt
3	Leopoldo Sucre Figarella	1962 - 1964	Rómulo Betancourt
1	Leopoldo Sucre Figarella	1964 - 1969	Raúl Leoni
1	José Curiel	1969 - 1974	Rafael Caldera
1	Jesús Vivas Casanova	1977 - 1979	Carlos Andrés Pérez
2	José Ignacio Álvarez Maldonado	1979	Carlos Andrés Pérez
1	Orlando Orozco	1979 - 1982	Luis Herrera Campins
2	María Cristina Maldonado	1982 - 1984	Luis Herrera Campins
1	Juan Pedro del Moral	1984 - 1988	Jaime Lusinchi
2	Vicente Pérez Cayena	1988 - 1989	Jaime Lusinchi
1	Gustavo José Rada	1989	Carlos Andrés Pérez
2	Augusto Faría Viso	1989 - 1990	Carlos Andrés Pérez
3	Roberto Smith Perera	1990 - 1992	Carlos Andrés Pérez
4	Fernando Martínez Mottola	1992 - 1993	Carlos Andrés Pérez
1	José Domingo Santander	1993 - 1994	Ramón José Velásquez
1	César Quintín Rosales	1994	Rafael Caldera
2	Ciro Zaa Álvarez	1994 - 1996	Rafael Caldera
3	Moisés Orozco Graterol	1996 - 1998	Rafael Caldera
4	Julio César Martí Espina	1998 - 1999	Rafael Caldera
1	Francisco Garcés	2010 - 2011	Hugo Chávez
