= Magalli Meda =

Venezuelan political activist

Magalli Meda is a Venezuelan political activist who in 2024 served as head of the national campaign of Venezuelan opposition leader María Corina Machado.

== Asylum ==
On March 20, 2024, a day before the start of the process of running for the presidential elections of 2024, the Attorney General Tarek William Saab appointed by the National Constituent Assembly ordered the arrest of Magalli Meda and that of eight other leaders of Machado's campaign, accusing them of planning "destabilizing actions".

On March 26, 2024, the Argentine government confirmed that President Javier Milei confirmed Magalli Meda, Pedro Urruchurtu, Humberto Villalobos, Claudia Macero, Omar González and Fernando Martínez Mottola had been received at the residence of the Argentine embassy in Caracas as guests. The next day, the embassy was withdrawn from the electric service. On March 29, the Argentine government officially granted diplomatic asylum to the leaders.

In May 2025, he left Venezuela through an internationally supported operation ("Operation Guacamaya"), spending approximately 18 months in exile and participating in the international political agenda of the opposition.

On the night between November 18 and 19, 2026, she returned to Venezuela, landing at Maiquetía airport.

== See also ==
- 2024 Venezuelan political crisis
- Argentina-Venezuela relations
- Siege of the Argentine Embassy and Ambassador's Residence in Venezuela
