= Government of Venezuela =

National government

Bolivarian Government of Venezuela Gobierno Bolivariano de Venezuela
- Federal presidential republic
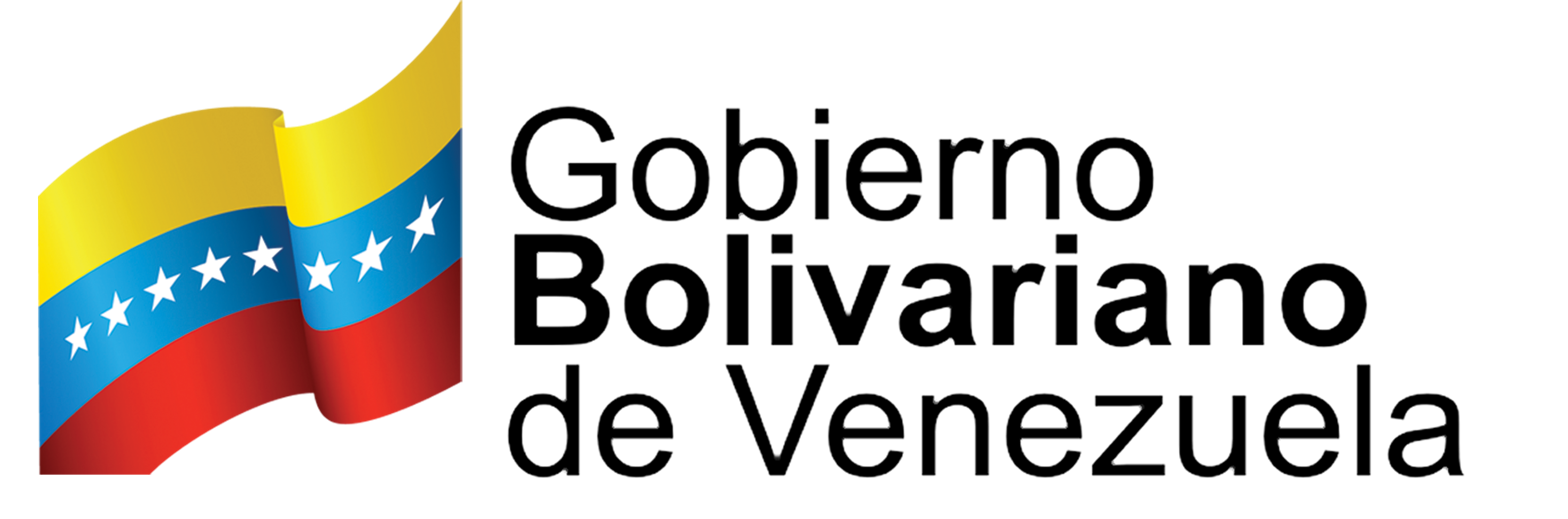
- Emblem of the Government of Venezuela
- Founding document: Constitution of Venezuela
- Country: Venezuela

Additional constitutional branches
- Citizen Power: Republican Moral Council
- Electoral Power: National Electoral Council

Legislative branch
- Legislature: National Assembly
- Assembly members: 285
- Meeting place: Palacio Federal Legislativo

Executive branch
- Leader: President of Venezuela
- Headquarters: Miraflores Palace

Judicial branch
- Court: Supreme Tribunal of Justice
- President: Caryslia Rodríguez
- Seat: Caracas

Venezuela is a federal presidential republic. The chief executive is the President of Venezuela, who is both head of state and head of government. Executive power is exercised by the President. Legislative power is vested in the National Assembly of Venezuela. Supreme judicial power is exercised by the Supreme Tribunal of Justice.

== Legislative power ==
Legislation can be initiated by the executive branch, the legislative branch (either a committee of the National Assembly or three members of the latter), the judicial branch, the citizen branch (ombudsman, public prosecutor, and controller general) or a public petition signed by no fewer than 0.1% of registered voters.

The voting age is 18, and voting is not compulsory.

== Executive power ==
The president is elected by a plurality vote with direct and universal suffrage for a six-year term. A president may be re-elected perpetually (only in consecutive terms) as of 15 February 2009. The president appoints the Vice President.

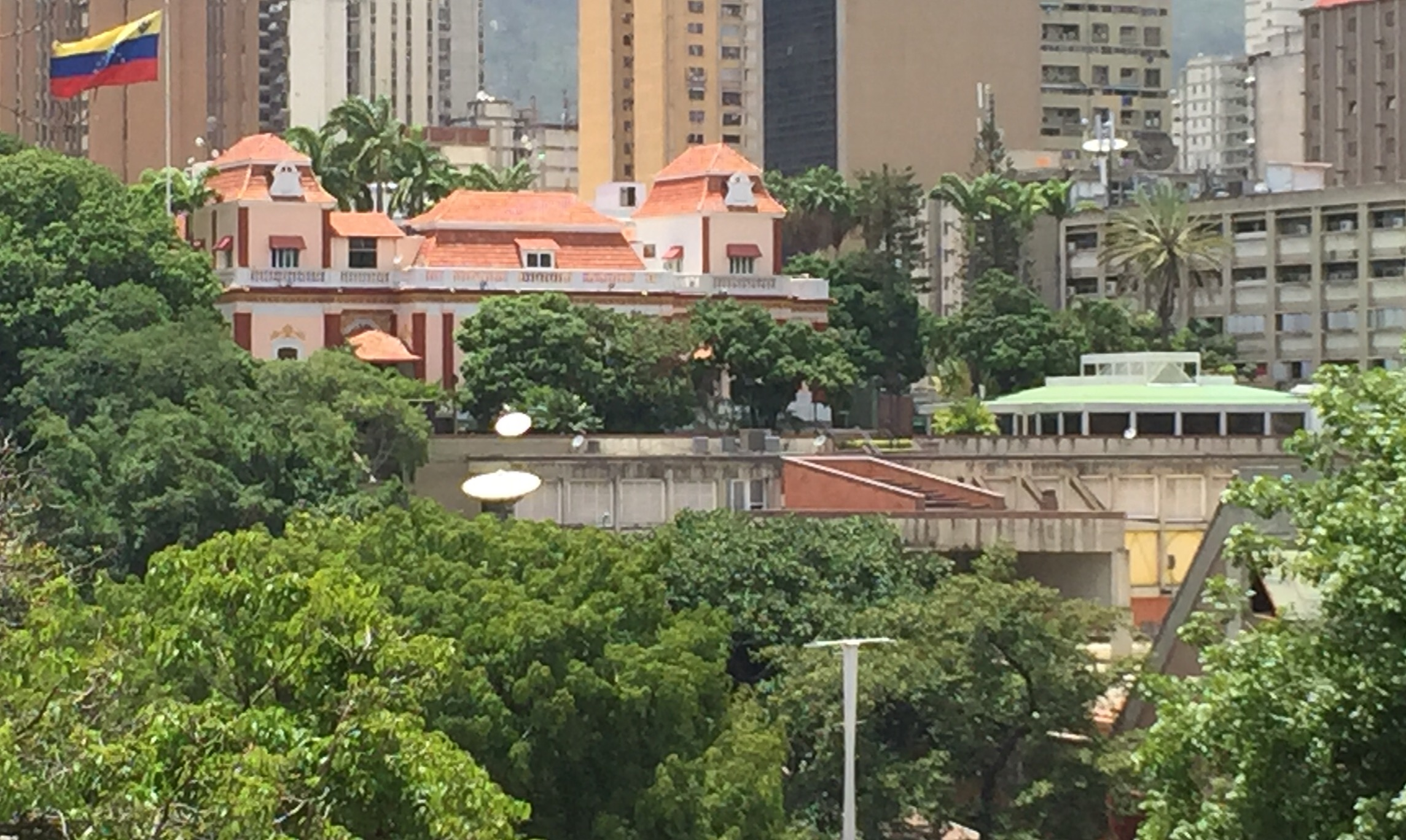
The Miraflores Palace is the seat of the Venezuelan Government, where the official office of the President of Venezuela is located.

The president decides the size and composition of the cabinet and makes appointments to it with the involvement of the National Assembly.

There are currently 33 ministries and one state ministry. Each of these entities is headed by a minister.

Cabinet of Venezuela
Office	Creation date, name change or merger	Ref
Office of the Presidency and Monitoring of Government Management	2012	
Ministry of Internal Relations, Justice and Peace	2013	
Ministry of Foreign Affairs	1810	
Ministry of Economy and Finance	2017	
Ministry of Defense	1810	
Ministry of Tourism and Foreign Trade	2019	
Ministry of Agriculture and Land	2016	
Ministry of Fisheries and Aquaculture	2016	
Ministry of Urban Agriculture	2016	
Ministry of Education	1881	
Ministry of Health	1936	
Ministry of the Social Work Process	2014	
Ministry of Housing and Habitat	2005	
Ministry of Ecosocialism and Water	2015	
Ministry of Petroleum	2017	
Ministry of Planning	2013	
Ministry of University Education	2014	
Ministry of Science, Technology and Innovation	2019	
Ministry of Communication and Information	2002	
Ministry of Communes and Social Protection	2009	
Ministry of Food	2004	
Ministry of Culture	2005	
Ministry of Youth and Sports	2014	
Ministry of Indigenous Peoples	2007	
Ministry of Women and Gender Equality	2009	
Ministry of the Prison Service	2011	
Ministry of Public Works	2017	
Ministry of Land Transportation	2017	
Ministry of Electric Power	2009	
Ministry of Ecological Mining Development	2016	
Ministry of Water Attention	2018	
Ministry of Industries and National Production	2018	
Ministry of Commerce	2018	

State Ministries:

Office	Creation date, name change or merger	Ref
Ministry of State for the New Peace Frontier	2015	

Former ministries include the Venezuelan Ministry of Infrastructure, which became the "Ministry of Public Works and Housing" and was split into the Ministry of Transport and Communications and the Ministry of Housing & Habitat in June 2010. The Ministry of Popular Economy became the "Ministry of Communal Economy" in 2007, and was merged into the Ministry of Communes and Social Protection on 3 March 2009, along with the Ministry of Participation and Social Protection. In February 2010 the Ministry of Planning and Development was merged with the Ministry of Finance to form the Ministry of Planning and Finance.

== Legislative branch ==
The National Assembly has 277 seats. Members are elected by popular vote to serve five-year terms. Each member may be re-elected for a maximum of ten additional terms. Three Assembly seats are by law reserved for the indigenous peoples of Venezuela. National Assembly elections were last held on 6 December 2015. When the National Assembly is not in session, its delegated committee acts on matters relating to the executive and in oversight functions. At various times throughout its history, Venezuela has had unicameral and bicameral legislative bodies.

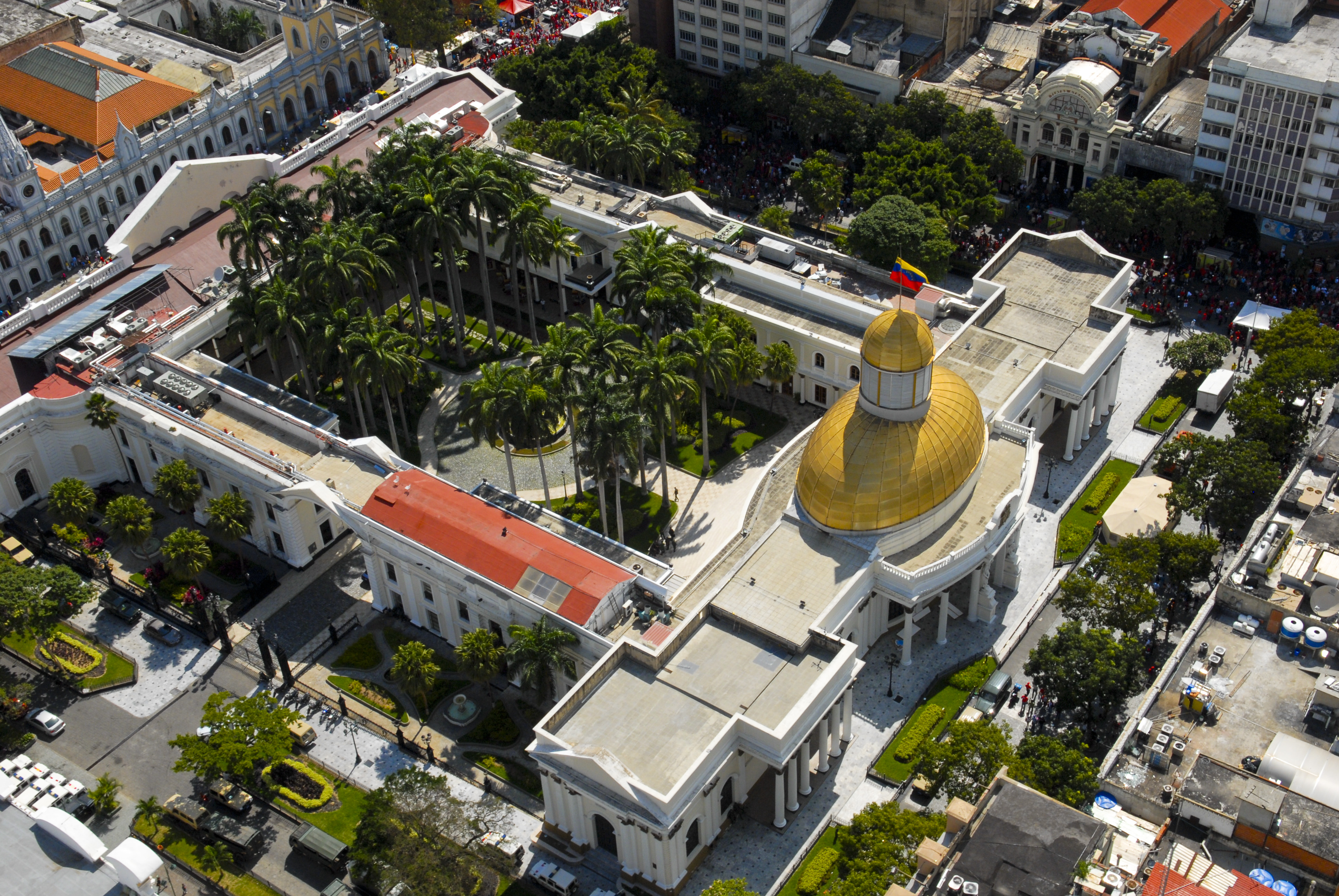
National Assembly of Venezuela

1. Venezuelan Congress, first one convened in 1811, replaced by the legislature of Gran Colombia
2. Assembly organized by Simon Bolivar, convened once to ratify a decision
3. Legislature of Gran Colombia
4. Unicameral Congress of Venezuela first convened under the 1830 constitution
5. Transitional Congress, convened mainly for the purpose of writing a new constitution
6. Bicameral Congress, consisting of a Senate (the formerly unicameral Congress) and the Chamber of Deputies
7. Unicameral National Assembly of 1999
8. Transitional legislative committee
9. Unicameral National Assembly, the current legislative body

== Judicial branch ==
The judicial branch is headed by the Supreme Tribunal of Justice, which may meet either in specialized chambers (of which there are six) or in plenary session. The 32 justices are appointed by the National Assembly and serve 12-year terms. The judicial branch also consists of lower courts, including district courts, municipal courts, and courts of the first instance.

== Citizens branch ==
The citizens branch consists of three components – the prosecutor general ("fiscal general"), the Defender of the People (an ombudsman), and the comptroller general. These officials of state, in addition to fulfilling their specific functions, also act collectively as the "Republican Moral Council" to submit to the Supreme Tribunal actions they believe are illegal, particularly those which violate the Constitution. The holders of the "citizen power" offices are appointed for seven-year terms by the National Assembly.

== Electoral branch ==
The fifth of the five branches of government under Article 136 the 1999 Venezuelan constitution is headed by the National Electoral Council, which is responsible for organizing elections at all levels. Its members are elected to seven-year terms by the National Assembly.

== See also ==
- Politics of Venezuela
