= Civil Aviation Accident Investigation Board =

The Civil Aviation Accident Investigation Board (JIAAC Spanish: Junta Investigadora de Accidentes de Aviación Civil) was the civil aviation accident investigation agency of Venezuela. The JIAAC had its headquarters in Chacao, Caracas, Miranda State. Before its closure, it was an organization under the Ministry of Transport and Communications. It was originally the Air Accident Investigation Committee (CIAA, Spanish: Comité de Investigación de Accidentes Aéreos). Previously the JIAAC was an independent authority of the Ministry of Public Works and Housing. That Ministry was known as the Ministry of Popular Power for Infrastructure (Spanish: Ministerio del Poder Popular para la Infraestructura) from January 2007 to March 2009, and was previously the Ministry for Infrastructure (Spanish: Ministerio para la Infraestructura Minfra). Lorllys Ramos Acevedo was the final director of the JIAAC.

Now Venezuela has the Directorate General for the Prevention and Investigation of Aeronautical Accidents (Spanish: Dirección General para la Prevención e Investigación de Accidentes Aeronáuticos), under the Ministry of Aquatic and Air Transport.

== See also ==
- Conviasa Flight 2350
- Santa Bárbara Airlines Flight 518
- West Caribbean Airways Flight 708
