= List of first women lawyers and judges in South America =

List of women who were first to achieve certain legal milestones in South America

This is a list of the first women lawyer(s) and judge(s) in South America. It includes the year in which the women were admitted to practice law (in parentheses). Also included are the first women in their country to achieve a certain distinction such as obtaining a law degree.

KEY

- FRA = Administrative division of France
- GBR = British overseas territory of the United Kingdom

== Argentina ==
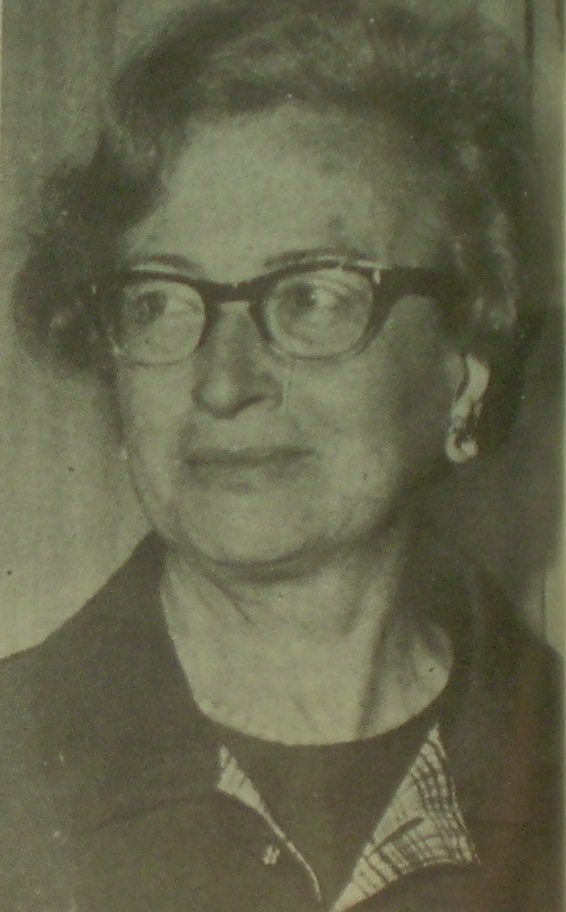
Margarita Argúas: First female Minister of the Supreme Court of Justice of the Nation (1970)

=== Lawyers ===
- María Angélica Barreda (1909) and Celia Tapias (1910): First female lawyers respectively in Argentina. Barreda was the first female law graduate in Argentina.
- María Romilda Servini: First female lawyer to work as a prosecutor in Argentina's criminal justice system (1974). She later became the first judge (and female) to return two minors appropriated during the civil-military dictatorship (1976-1983).
- Rosa Chiquichano (1999): First female lawyer of Tehuelche (Mapuche) origin in Argentina. She was also the first Mapuche female lawyer in the Chubut Province, Argentina.
- Karina Miguel (c. 2003): First Roma (female) lawyer in Argentina
- Jordana Duarte Martinelli (2020): First Guarani female lawyer in Argentina
- María Gabriela San Martín: First female lawyer elected to the Council of the Judiciary in Argentina (2020)
- Antonela Guevara (2023): First Selkʼnam (female) lawyer in Tierra del Fuego [Argentina and Chile]
- Mariel Tschieder: First female to serve as the President of the Argentine Federation of Bar Associations (FACA) (2024)

=== General Defender and Attorney General ===
- Stella Maris Martínez: First female to serve as the General Defender of the Nation of Argentina (2006)
- Alejandra Gils Carbó: First female to serve as the Attorney General of Argentina (2012)

=== Judicial officers ===
- Maria Luisa Anastasi de Walger: First female judge in Argentina (1955)
- Margarita Argúas (1925): First female appointed as the Minister (Judge) of the Supreme Court of Argentina (1970)
- Alicia Oliveira: First female to serve as a Judge of the Juvenile Correctional Court of the Federal Capital in Argentina (1973)
- Elsa Kelly: First female judge of the International Tribunal for the Law of the Sea (2011)
- Silvia Fernandez de Gurmendi: First Argentinian female appointed as the President of the International Criminal Court (2015)
- Verónica Gómez: First Argentinian female to serve as a Judge of the Inter-American Court of Human Rights (2016)
- Inés Weinberg de Roca: First Argentinian (female) to serve as a Judge of the United Nations Appeals Tribunal and its President (2009)

== Bolivia ==
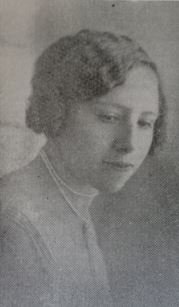
Esilda Villa: First female lawyer in Bolivia (1929)

- Esilda Villa (1929): First female lawyer in Bolivia
- Nelly Sfeir Gonzalez: First president of reconstituted Union Femenina Universitaria (Union of Women University Students). A licensed lawyer in Bolivia, she was also a law student activist and protest organizer that demanded the vote for women (1952).
- Graciela Lara de Penaranda: First female lawyer to receive a doctorate in Altos Estudios Militares (DAEM) [HIgher Military Studies] (1966)
- María Josefa Saavedra: First female appointed as a Minister (Judge) of the Supreme Court of Justice of Bolivia (1972)
- Elizabeth Iñiguez de Salinas and Silvia Salame Farjat: First females to serve as titular magistrates of the Plurinational Constitutional Tribunal (1999; formerly the Constitutional Court of Bolivia when established in 1998). In 2004, Iñiguez de Salinas later became the first female President of the same court.
- Maria Antonieta Pizza Bilbao: First female to serve as the President of the National Bar Association of Bolivia (2000)
- Elena Lowenthal: First female appointed as the Vocal (District Judges) for the Superior Court of Bolivia (2002)
- Amalia Morales: First Aymara female to become a judge in Bolivia (2010)
- Cristina Mamani: First indigenous (Aymara) female elected as a judge in Bolivia (2011)
- Abigail Salas: First female candidate for the Attorney General of Bolivia (2012). Salas was unsuccessful, as she was disqualified from the race.
- María Cristina Diaz Sosa: First female to serve as President of the Supreme Court of Justice of Bolivia (2019)
- Paola Verónica Prudencio: First female elected as the President of the Plurinational Constitutional Tribunal of Bolivia (2025)

== Brazil ==
=== Law Degree ===
- Maria Coelho da Silva Sobrinha, Maria Fragoso e Delmira Secundina da Costa and Maria Augusta C. Meira Vasconcelos: First females to obtain law degrees in Brazil (1888-1898)

=== Lawyers ===
- Esperança Garcia: First female (an enslaved Black woman) to act as an attorney in Brazil (1770)
- Myrthes Gomes de Campos (1906): First female lawyer in Brazil (though she practiced the profession of lawyer beginning in 1899)
- Maria José Saraiva: First female lawyer to present a case before a Jury Court in Brazil
- Iracema Tavares Dias Nardi and Zuleika Sucupira Kenworthy: First females to hold the position of prosecutor in Brazil and Latin America respectively (Nardi in 1935 in Mina Gerais; Kenworthy in São Paulo in 1948)
- Joenia Wapichana (1997): First indigenous (Wapishana) female lawyer in Brazil. She was also the first female lawyer to argue a case before the Supreme Court of Brazil.
- Adriana Pinheiro: First Kanamari (Ticuna) female lawyer in Brazil
- Vercilene Dias (2016): First Quilombola female to become a lawyer in Brazil and earn a Masters in Law (2022)
- Patrícia Vanzolini: First female in the history of the Brazilian Bar Association to be elected President (2022)
- Milady France (2023): First Borari (Munduruku) female lawyer in Brazil

=== Attorney General and Prosecutor General ===
- Grace Mendonça: First female appointed as the Attorney General of Brazil (2017)
- Raquel Dodge (1986): First female appointed as the Prosecutor General of Brazil (2017)
- Geovana Scatolino Silva: First female to hold the position of federal corregerator-general of the Public Prosecutor's Office (Brazil) (2018-2019)

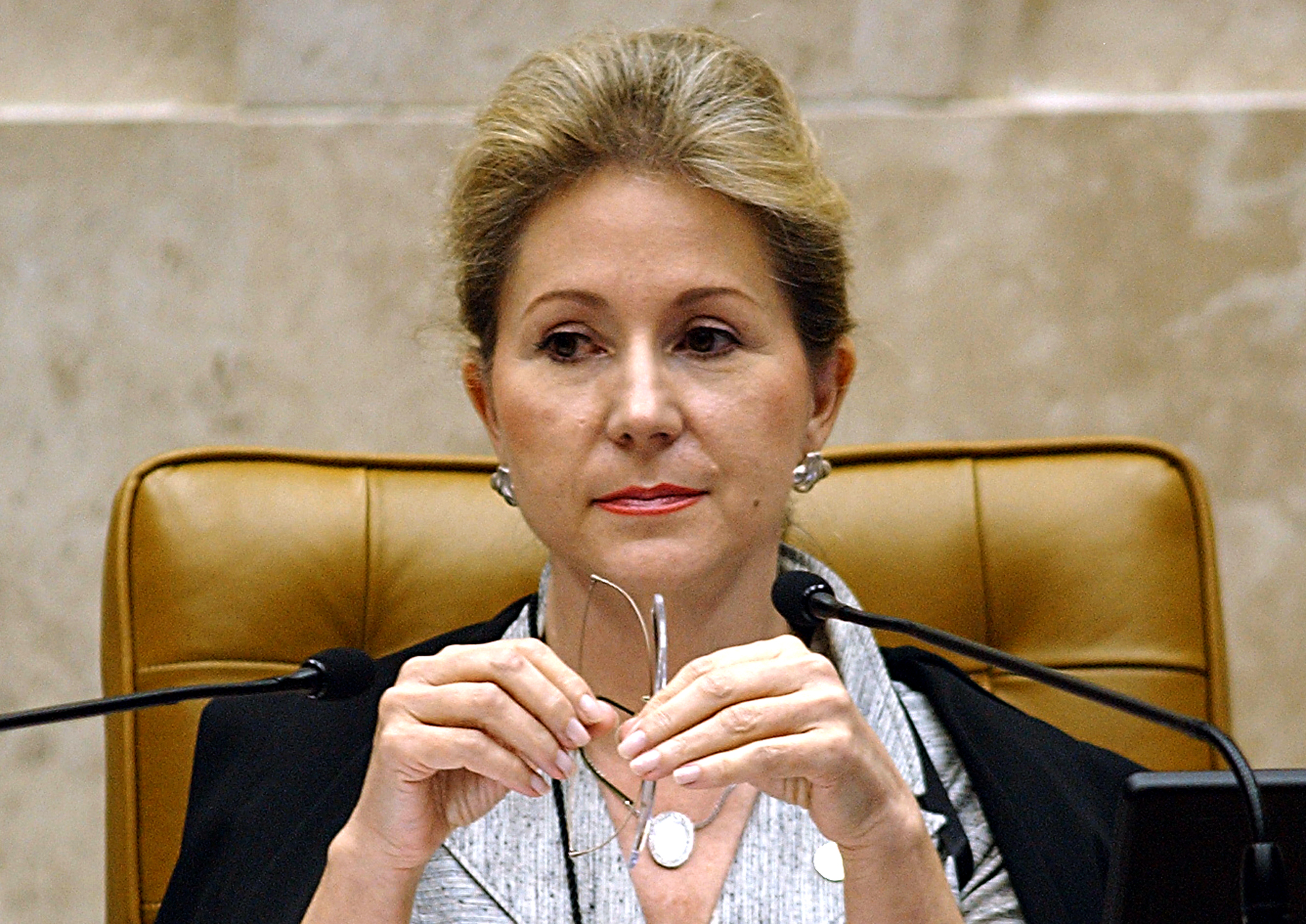
Ellen Gracie Northfleet was Brazil's first woman appointed to the Supreme Court (2000) and the first female Chief Justice (2006)

=== Judicial officers ===
- Ellen Gracie Northfleet: first woman to be appointed justice of the Supreme Court of Brazil (2000) and Brazil's first female Chief Justice (2006)
- Auri Moura Costa: First female municipal judge in Brazil (1939). She was also the first female to serve as a Judge of Law (1968).
- Thereza Grisólia Tang and Ana Maria da Silveira: First female judges in Brazil (1954)
- Sônia Taciana Sanches Goulart: First female to serve as a Labor judge in Brazil (1960)
- Mary de Aguiar Silva: First female Black judge appointed in Brazil (1962)
- Maria Rita Soares de Andrade: First female appointed as a federal judge in Brazil (1967). She was also the first female lawyer in the states of Bahia and Sergipe.
- Maria Thereza de Andrade Braga Haynes: First female to serve as a Judge of the Justice of the Federal District and Territories (1974) and its President (1988)
- Lydia Dias Fernandes: First female judge to serve as a President of a Court of Justice in Brazil (Court of Justice of Pará; 1979–1981)
- Ana Maria Goffi Flaquer Scartezzini, Anna Maria Pimentel, Lúcia Valle Figueiredo Collarile and Diva Prestes Marcondes Malerbi: First females to serve as Judges of the then newly created Federal Regional Court of the Third Region of Brazil (1989). Pimentel was the first female to serve as the court's President (2003).
- Cnea Cimini Moreira de Oliveira: First female to serve as a Minister of the Supreme Labor Court of Brazil (1990-1999)
- Eliana Calmon: First female to serve as a Minister of the Superior Court of Justice of Brazil (1999-2013)
- Sylvia Steiner: First Brazilian (female) to serve as a Judge of the International Criminal Court (2003)
- Maria Elizabeth Guimarães Teixeira Rocha: First female to serve as a Minister of the Superior Military Court of Brazil (2007) and well as its President (2014)
- Nancy Andrighi: First female elected as the General Corrector (Electoral General Attorney) of the Superior Electoral Court of Brazil (2011)
- Carmen Lúcia Antunes Rocha: First female Minister to serve as President of the Superior Electoral Court of Brazil (2012)
- Carla Santillo: First female to serve as the President of the State Audit Court of Brazil (2015)
- Laurita Hilário Vaz: First female to serve as the President of the Superior Court of Justice of Brazil (2016)
- Martha Halfeld Furtado de Mendonca Schmidt: First Brazilian (female) to serve as a Judge of the United Nations Appeals Tribunal (2016)
- Cristina Peduzzi: First female Minister to serve as the President of the Superior Labor Court of Brazil (2020)
- Edilene Lôbo: First Black female to serve as a Minister of the Superior Electoral Court of Brazil (2023)

== Chile ==
- Matilde Throup (1892): First female to earn a law degree (1891) and become a lawyer in Chile
- Claudina Acuña Montenegro (1923): First female judge in Chile (1925)
- Adriana Olguin: First female elected as a counselor to the Chilean Bar Association (1955)
- Mónica Maldonado Croquevielle: First female to serve as the Judicial Prosecutor of the Supreme Court of Chile (1960)
- Fannie Leibovich Guberman: First female to serve as a Minister (Judge) and President of a Court of Appeals in Chile (upon her appointment as a Minister and later the President of the Court of Appeals of Valparaíso in 1971 and 1972 respectively)
- Luz Bulnes Aldunate: First female to serve as a Judge of the Constitutional Court of Chile (1989)
- Raquel Camposano Echegaray: First female to join the Supreme Court of Chile (1997)
- María Antonia Morales Villagrán: First female appointed as a Minister (Judge) of the Supreme Court of Chile (2001)
- Cecilia Medina: First (Chilean) female to serve as the President of the Inter-American Court of Human Rights (2008)
- Olga Feliú: First female to serve as the President of the Chilean Bar Association (2011)
- Solange Huerta: First female to serve as the Chief Prosecutor of any Prosecutor's Office in Chile (2012)
- Marisol Peña: First female to serve as the President of the Constitutional Court of Chile (2013)
- María Teresa Infante Caffi: First Chilean (female) to serve as a Judge of the International Tribunal for the Law of the Sea (2020)
- María Paz Constanza Jaramillo Loaiza: First female lawyer sworn in by the Court of First Instance and Guarantee of Rapa Nui (2021) [Chile's Easter Island]
- Andrea Muñoz Sánchez: First female to serve as the surrogate President of the Supreme Court of Chile (2021)
- Antonela Guevara (2023): First Selkʼnam (female) lawyer in Tierra del Fuego [Argentina and Chile]
- Joanna Heskia: First Chilean (female) lawyer to become a member of the International Criminal Court (2023)

== Colombia ==
- Rosa Rojas Castro (1942): First female lawyer and judge (1943) in Colombia
- Berta Zapata Casas (1947): First female magistrate of the Supreme Court of Justice of Colombia. She is also the first female lawyer to graduate from the University of Antioquia and the first female President of the Superior Court of Medellín. [Antioquia Department, Colombia]
- Fabiola Aguirre: First female magistrate in Colombia (1952)
- Teresa Bocanegra: First female prosecutor in Colombia (1958)
- Rosa Aydée Anzola Linares: First female to serve as a Counselor of the Council of State (Colombia) (1978)
- Fanny González Franco (1958): First female appointed as a Justice of the Supreme Court of Justice of Colombia (1984). During the 1960s, she became the first female to serve as a Minister of the Superior Court of Pereira [Risaralda Department, Colombia]. She was also the first female to study law at the Pontifical Bolivarian University.
- Eva Marina Pulido de Barón: First female appointed as a magistrate of the Criminal Chamber of the Supreme Court of Justice of Colombia (2002)
- Clara Inés Vargas Hernández: First female to serve as a Judge of the Constitutional Court of Colombia (2001) and its President (2003)
- María del Rosario González de Lemus: First female appointed as the President of the Criminal Chamber of the Supreme Court of Justice of Colombia (2010)
- Viviane Morales Hoyos: First female appointed as the Attorney General of the Nation of Colombia (2011-2012)
- Ruth Marina Díaz Rueda: First female justice appointed as President of the Supreme Court of Justice of Colombia (2013). She was also the first female magistrate of the Court of San Gil, Colombia (1993).
- Belkis Florentina Izquierdo Torres: First indigenous (Arhuaco) female to serve as an Auxiliary Magistrate of the Superior Council of the Judiciary of Colombia (2014)
- Aura Benilda Tegría Cristancho: First U’wa female lawyer in Colombia
- Dayana Bisbicus: First Awa-Kwaiker female lawyer in Colombia
- Iris Marín Ortiz: First female to serve as the Ombudsman for Colombia (2024)
- Lucy Cruz de Quiñones: First female to serve as President of the Colombian Academy of Jurisprudence (2025)

== Ecuador ==
- Obdulia Luna (1928): First female lawyer in Ecuador
- Fanny León Cordero: First female judge in Ecuador (1947)
- Mariana Yépez Andrade (1971): First female appointed as a prosecutor (c. 1975) in Ecuador. She is also the first female to serve as a Judge of the Superior Court of Justice in Quito (1975-1978). She is also the first female Attorney General of Ecuador (1999).
- Nina Pacari: First Kichwa-Otavalo Sarance female lawyer in Ecuador
- Mariana Yumbay: First indigenous (Waranka) female judge in Ecuador (2012)
- Beliza Coro Guairacaja (2012): First Puruhá female lawyer in Ecuador
- Ruth Seni Pinoargote: First female to serve as the President of a Superior Court of Justice in Ecuador [Portoviejo, Manabí Province], as well as the first female Minister (Judge) of the Constitutional Court of Ecuador
- Wendy Molina Andrade: First female to serve as the Vice-President of the Constitutional Court of Ecuador (c. 2013)
- María Paulina Aguirre: First female judge to serve as President of the National Court of Justice of Ecuador (2018)

== Falkland Islands (GBR) ==
See Women in law in the United Kingdom

== French Guiana (FRA) ==
- Hélène Sirder (1978): First female Guyanese lawyer in French Guiana. She became the first female Bâtonnière of the Guyane Bar Association in 1992.
- Constance Rézaire-Loupec (c. 1970): First female magistrate in French Guiana (1978)
- Marie-Laure Rainsart Piazza and Béatrice Bugeon–Almendros: First females to serve as the President of French Guiana's Court of Appeal of Cayenne (successively beginning in 2017)
- Elisabeth Rolin: First (female) Vice-President of French Guiana’s Administrative Court of Cayenne (2024)

== Guyana ==
- Iris de Freitas Brazao (1929): First female lawyer in the Anglophone Caribbean, as well as the first female prosecutor of a murder trial in the same region. Brazao practiced law in Guyana when it was known as British Guiana.
- Ena Luckhoo: First Indian female lawyer in Guyana
- Norma Jackson: First female magistrate when Guyana was known as British Guiana (c. 1958)
- Désirée Bernard (1964): First female judge in Guyana (upon her appointment as a Judge of the High Court of Guyana in 1980). She is also the first female appointed as a Justice of Appeal in the Court of Appeal of the Supreme Court of Guyana (1992), Chief Justice (1996), Chancellor of the Judiciary of Guyana and the Caribbean (2001) and Judge of the Caribbean Court of Justice (2005). In 1976, she became the first female President of the Organization of Commonwealth Caribbean Bar Associations (OCCBA).
- Claudette La Bennett: First female to serve as a Chief Magistrate in Guyana (1990)
- Pearlene Roach: First female to serve as President of the Guyana Bar Association (c. 1995)
- Claudette Singh (1973), Rosalie Robertson (1983), and Roxane George-Wiltshire (1990): First females appointed as Senior Counsels in Guyana (2017). Singh was the first female Deputy Solicitor General of Guyana whereas George-Wiltshire was the first female to serve as Guyana's Director of Public Prosecutions.
- Shalimar Ali-Hack: First Muslim female appointed as a Senior Counsel in Guyana (2019). She is also Guyana's first Muslim female attorney (1990), as well as the first Muslim female to serve as the Director of Public Prosecutions.

== Paraguay ==
- Serafina Dávalos (1907): First female lawyer and judge in Paraguay (she became a member of the Superior Court of Justice of Paraguay in 1910)
- Myriam Peña Candia: First female prosecutor (1977) and Judge of the Court of First Instance in Paraguay (1980). In 2021, she became the first Paraguayan (female) to run for the position of Judge of the Inter-American Court of Human Rights.
- Amparo Maura Samaniego de Paciello: First female to serve as the President of the Paraguayan Bar Association
- Alicia Beatriz Pucheta de Correa: First female to serve as a Minister (Judge) of the Supreme Court of Paraguay, as well as its President (2007-2008; 2016–2017)
- María Salomé González de Ohta: First South American and Paraguayan (female) to practice law in Japan (2008)
- Luciana Ferreira Barboza (2018): First Yshyr female lawyer in Paraguay
- Sandra Quiñónez: First female appointed as the Attorney General of Paraguay (2018)

== Peru ==
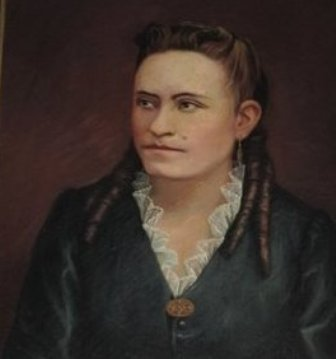
Trinidad María Enríquez: First female to earn a law degree in Peru (1907)

- Trinidad María Enríquez (1878): First Peruvian woman to earn a law degree. Enriquez was denied the ability to practice law and fought her case until her death in 1891. [Peru]
- Miguelina Acosta Cárdenas and Rosa Perez Liendo (c. 1920): First female lawyers in Peru
- Marcela Montenegro Cannon (1966): First female appointed as a Judge of Lands of Peru (1976)
- Blanca Nélida Colán: First female to serve as the Prosecutor of the Nation of Peru (1992)
- Elcira Vásquez (1963): First female appointed as the Supreme Vocal for the Supreme Court of Justice of Peru (1993)
- Beatriz Merino: First female to serve as the Public Defender (Ombudsman) of Peru (2005-2011). She was also the first Peruvian woman to graduate from Harvard Law School in 1977.
- Delia Revoredo de Mur: First female appointed as a Judge of the Constitutional Court of Peru (2000)
- Mónica Feria Tinta: First Peruvian-born and Latin American (female) lawyer called to the Bar of England and Wales
- Rosa Ledesma Alcántara: First female elected as President of the National Board of Deans of the Bar Associations of Peru (2014)
- Luz del Carmen Ibáñez Carranza: First Peruvian (female) elected as a Judge of the International Criminal Court (2017)
- Susana Távara Espinoza: First female to serve as the Secretary General of the Constitutional Court of Peru (2019)
- Marianella Leonor Ledesma Narváez: First female to serve as the President of the Constitutional Court of Peru (2020)
- Elvia Barrios Alvarado: First female to serve as the President of the Supreme Court and of the Judicial Power of Peru (2021)

== South Georgia and Sandwich Islands (GBR) ==
See Women in law in the United Kingdom

== Suriname ==
- Martha Henriëtte Kreps (1958): First female lawyer in Suriname. She was preceded by an unknown woman who became the first female to pass the bar exam in Suriname in 1933, but supposedly did not practice.
- Rosemarie Currie: First female notary in Suriname (c. 1970s)
- Héloïse Rozenblad: First female prosecutor in Suriname (1980). She was also the first female to serve as the Attorney General of the High Court of Justice of Suriname (appointed 1997).
- Cynthia Valstein-Montnor (c. 1956): First female judge in Suriname (upon becoming a member of the High Court of Justice of Suriname in 1998). She became the first female to serve as the Vice-President of the High Court of Justice in 2010.
- Samantha Gadjradj: First female to serve as the Dean of the Surinamese Bar Association (2019)
- Gloria Karg-Stirling: First female to serve as the President of the newly formed Constitutional Court of Suriname (2020)
- Anoeradha Akkal-Ramautar, Rinette Djokarto, and Maya Fokké-Manohar: First females to serve as members of the newly formed Constitutional Court of Suriname (2020)

== Uruguay ==
- Clothilde Luisi (1911): First female lawyer in Uruguay
- Sofía Álvarez Vignoli: First female (a lawyer) elected as Senator in Uruguay (1942)
- Hilda Moltedo de Espínola: First female to serve as a Judge of the Administrative Litigation Court of Uruguay (1979)
- Sara Fons de Genta (c. 1955): First female appointed as the Minister (Judge) of the Supreme Court of Justice of Uruguay during the Uruguayan Dictatorship (1981-1985)
- Jacinta Balbela (1945): First female appointed as the Minister (Judge) of the Supreme Court of Justice of Uruguay upon the return to democracy (1985-1989). In 1987, she became the first female to serve as the President of the Supreme Court of Justice of Uruguay.
- María Elsa Martín de Aramburu: First female to serve as the President of the Uruguayan Bar Association (c. 1986)
- María Elisa Martirena: First female to serve as the Acting Court Prosecutor and Attorney General of the Nation of Uruguay (1997)
- Edith Wieder: First Jewish (female) to serve as President of the Uruguayan Bar Association (2002-2004)
- Graciela Gatti: First Uruguayan female to serve as the President of the International Residual Mechanism for Criminal Tribunals (Mechanism) (2022)
- Sandra Boragno: First female to serve as the State Attorney for Administrative Litigation of Uruguay (2022)

== Venezuela ==
- Luisa Amelia Perez Perozo: First female lawyer in Venezuela
- Panchita Soublette Saluzzo: First female judge in Venezuela
- Josefina Calcano de Temeltas: First female appointed as a Justice of the Supreme Court of Venezuela (c. 1979)
- Cecilia Sosa (1967): First female appointed as the President of the Supreme Court of Justice of Venezuela (1996-2000)
- Dilia Parra Guillén: First (female) Ombudsman for Venezuela (1999)
- Luisa Ortega Díaz: First female appointed as the Prosecutor General (or Attorney General) of Venezuela (2007-2017)

== See also ==
- Justice ministry
- List of first women lawyers and judges by nationality
- List of first women lawyers and judges in Africa
- List of first women lawyers and judges in Asia
- List of first women lawyers and judges in Europe
- List of first women lawyers and judges in North America
- List of first women lawyers and judges in Oceania
- List of first women lawyers and judges in the United States
- List of the first women holders of political offices in South America
