= Politics of Ecuador =

The politics of Ecuador are multi-party. The central government polity is a quadrennially elected presidential, unicameral representative democracy. The President of Ecuador is head of state and head of the army on a multi-party system, and leads a cabinet with further executive power. Legislative power is not limited to the National Assembly, as it may to a lesser degree be exercised by the executive which consists of the President convening an appointed executive cabinet. Subsequent acts of the National Assembly are supreme over Executive Orders where sufficient votes have been cast by the legislators. The judiciary is independent of the executive and the legislature. Ecuador is also considered a constitutional republic.

The Constitution of Ecuador provides for a four-year term of office for the President, Vice-President, and members of the National Assembly with concurrent elections. Presidents and legislators may be re-elected immediately. Citizens must be at least 16 years of age to vote: suffrage is universal and compulsory for literate persons aged 18 to 65 and optional for 16 and 17 years of age and other eligible voters.

Ecuador has been characterized as a fragile democracy, with democratic backsliding under the presidencies of Rafael Correa (2007–2017) and Daniel Noboa (2023–). The Economist Intelligence Unit rated Ecuador a "hybrid regime" in 2022.

== Political conditions ==
Ecuador's political parties have historically been small, loose organizations that depended more on populist, often charismatic, leaders to retain support than on programs or ideology. Frequent internal splits have produced extreme factionalism. However, a pattern has emerged in which administrations from the center-left alternate with those from the center-right. Although Ecuador's political elite is highly factionalized along regional, ideological, and personal lines, a strong desire for consensus on major issues often leads to compromise. Opposition forces in Congress are loosely organized, but historically they often unite to block the administration's initiatives and to remove cabinet ministers.

Constitutional changes enacted by a specially elected National Constitutional Assembly in 1998 took effect on 10 August 1998. The new constitution strengthens the executive branch by eliminating mid-term congressional elections and by circumscribing Congress' power to challenge cabinet ministers. Party discipline is traditionally weak, and routinely many deputies switch allegiance during each Congress. However, after the new Constitution took effect, the Congress passed a Code of Ethics which imposes penalties on members who defy their party leadership on key votes.

Beginning with the 1996 election, the more indigenous, less Spanish-rooted, ethnic groups abandoned their traditional policy of shunning the official political system and participated actively. The indigenous population has established itself as a significant force in Ecuadorian politics, as shown by the selection of indigenous representative Nina Pacari, who led the indigenous political party, Pachakutik, as Second Vice-President of the 1998 Congress.

== Judicial branch ==
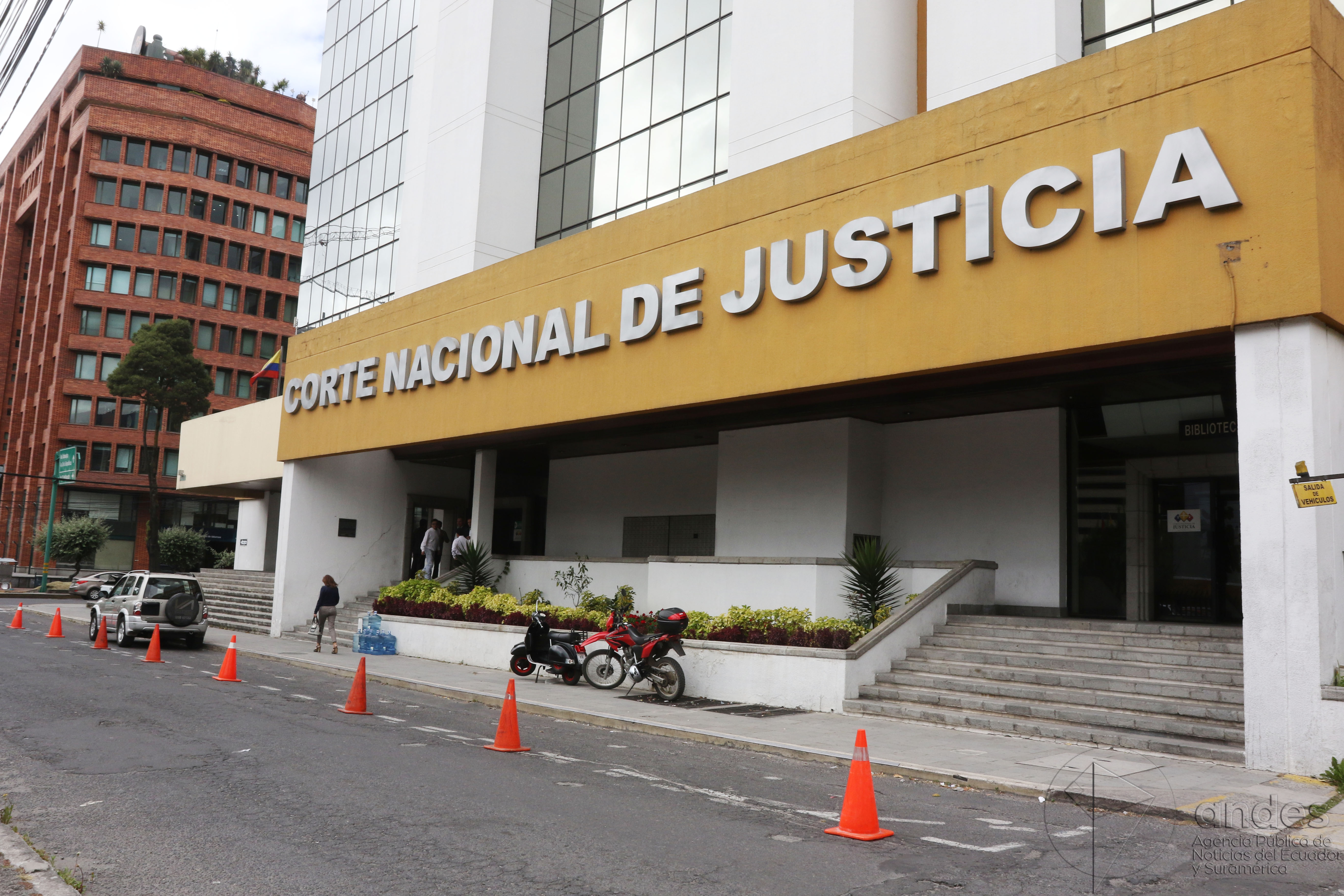
National Justice Court

State Attorney General's Office Building

=== The former Supreme Court of Ecuador ===
New justices of the Supreme Court of Ecuador were elected by the sitting members of the court. A bare majority of Congress, acting in a special session called by former President Lucio Gutiérrez in December 2004, ousted 27 of the 31 justices and replaced them with new members chosen by Congress; notwithstanding, the lack of any provisions permitting impeachment of Supreme Court justices by Congress and the specific provisions giving the Court the power to select new members. Earlier, in November 2004, Congress replaced the majority of judges on the country's Electoral Court and Constitutional Court by a similar process.

==== List of presidents ====
President	Períod
José Fernández Salvador López	1830–1834
José María de Arteta y Calisto	1835
Joaquín Gutiérrez Restrepo	1836
Fidel Quijano Valencia	1837
Víctor Félix de Sanmiguel Cacho	1838
José María de Arteta y Calisto	1839–1840
Joaquín Gutiérrez Restrepo	1841
Víctor Félix de Sanmiguel Cacho	1842
José María de Arteta y Calisto	1843
Joaquín Gutiérrez Restrepo	1844
Luis De Saá	1845
Víctor Félix de Sanmiguel Cacho	1846–1847
Salvador Ortega Estacio	1848
Pedro José de Arteta y Calisto	1849
Miguel Alvarado	1850
Pedro José de Arteta y Calisto	1851
Pablo Vásconez Román	1852
Antonio Bustamante del Mazo	1853
Miguel Alvarado	1854
Ramón Borja	1855
Carlos Tamayo	1856
Antonio Bustamante del Mazo	1857
Nicolás Espinosa	1858
Manuel Carrión	1859
Ramón Miño	1860
Pedro José de Arteta y Calisto	1861
Ramón Miño	1862
Antonio Gómez de la Torre	1863
Carlos Tamayo	1864
Pedro José de Arteta y Calisto	1865
Ramón Miño	1866
Antonio Muñoz	1867
Luis A. Salazar	1868
Manuel Checa	1869
Pablo Herrera González	1869
Ramón Miño	1870
Nicolás Martínez	1871
Rafael Carvajal Guzmán	1872
Luis A. Salazar	1873
Rafael Quevedo	1874
Pablo Herrera González	1875
Pedro Fermín Cevallos	1876
Julio Castro	1877
Antonio Muñoz	1878
Antonio Portilla	1879
Francisco A. Arboleda	1880
Vicente Nieto	1881
León Espinosa de los Monteros	1882
Vicente Nieto	1883–1885
Pedro Fermín Cevallos	1886
Pedro J. Cevallos y Fernández Salvador	1886
Alejandro Ribadeneira Salazar	1887
Julio Castro	1888
Antonio Robalino	1889
Luis A. Salazar	1890
Julio Castro	1891
Antonio Portilla	1892
José Modesto Espinosa	1893
Vicente Nieto	1894
José Modesto Espinosa	1895
Francisco J. Montalvo	1896
León Espinosa de los Monteros	1897
Vicente Nieto	1898
Manuel Montalvo	1899
José María Borja	1900
Belisario Albán Mestanza	1901
Leopoldo Pino	1902
Manuel Benigno Cueva Betancourt	1903
Belisario Albán Mestanza	1904
Leopoldo Pino	1905
Belisario Albán Mestanza	1906
Manuel Montalvo	1907
Pacífico Villagómez	1908
Alejandro Cárdenas	1909
Belisario Albán Mestanza	1910
Pacífico Villagómez	1911
Belisario Albán Mestanza	1912
Alejandro Cárdenas	1913
Francisco Andrade Marín	1914
Leopoldo Pino	1915
Manuel Eduardo Escudero	1916
Alejandro Cárdenas	1917
Leopoldo Pino	1918
Alejandro Cárdenas	1919
Belisario Albán Mestanza	1920
Leopoldo Pino	1921
Modesto A. Peñaherrera	1922
José María Ayora Cueva	1923
Manuel Eduardo Escudero Viteri	1924
Leopoldo Pino	1925
José Luis Román	1925
Modesto A. Peñaherrera	1926
José María Ayora Cueva	1927
Manuel Eduardo Escudero Viteri	1928
Manuel R. Balarezo	1929
Francisco Pérez Borja	1930
Pablo N. Roldán	1931
Manuel Eduardo Escudero Viteri	1932
Manuel María Borrero González	1932
José Antonio Baquero de la Calle	1933
Camilo Octavio Andrade López	1934
Vicente Enríquez Andrade	1935
Alejandro Ribadeneira Salazar	1936
Camilo Octavio Andrade López	1937
Benjamín Terán Coronel	1939
Camilo Octavio Andrade López	1940
Belisario Ponce Borja	1941
Celio Enrique Salvador Quintana	1942
Leoncio Patiño Carrión	1943
Aurelio A. Bayas Argudo	1944
Belisario Ponce Borja	1945
José María Suárez M.	1946
Belisario Ponce Borja	1947
Alejandro Ribadeneira Salazar	1948
Camilo Gallegos Toledo	1949
José María Villagómez Román	1950
Benjamín Cevallos Arízaga	1951
Luis F. Madera Negrete	1952
Manuel Elicio Flor Torres	1953
Alfonso Mora Bowen	1954
Camilo Gallegos Toledo	1955
José María Villagómez Román	1956
Benjamín Cevallos Arízaga	1957
Luis Eladio Benítez Jara	1958
Manuel Elicio Flor Torres	1959
Benjamín Cevallos Arízaga	1960
Camilo Gallegos Toledo	1961
José María Villagómez Román	1962
Francisco Montero Carrión	1963
Francisco Ochoa Ortiz	1964
Julio Tobar Donoso	1965
Francisco Páez Romero	1965
Arturo del Pozo Saltos	1966
Francisco Ochoa Ortiz	1967
Julio Tobar Donoso	1968
Benjamín Cevallos Arízaga	1968
Ricardo Cornejo Rosales	1969
César Durango Montenegro	1970
Rafael Terán Varea	1971
Miguel Aguirre Sánchez	1972
Tomás Valdiviezo Alba	1973
Carlos A. Jaramillo Andrade	1974–1975
Luis Jaramillo Pérez	1976
César Durango Montenegro	1977
Gonzalo Karolys Martínez	1978–1979
Armando Pareja Andrade	1979–1981
Gonzalo Zambrano Palacios	1981–1983
Carlos Pozo Montesdeoca	1983–1984
Gonzalo Córdova Galarza	1984–1986
Germán Carrión Arciniegas	1986–1987
Juan Agustín Quinde Burneo	1987–1988
Ramiro Larrea Santos	1988–1990
Walter Guerrero Vivanco	1990–1993
Francisco Acosta Yépez	1993–1995
Miguel Macías Hurtado	1995
Carlos Solórzano Constantine	1995–1997
Héctor Romero Parducci	1997–2000
Galo Pico Mantilla	2000–2002
Armando Bermeo Castillo	2002–2004
Hugo Quintana Coello	2004
Ramón Rodríguez Noboa	2004–2005
Guillermo Castro Dáger	2005
Jaime Velasco Dávila	2005–2008
Roberto Gómez Mera	2008

=== Reorganization of Court (2008) ===
After the adoption of a new Constitution in 2008, the judicial branch of the country was completely renewed to provide a cooperative leadership by having a judicial and an administrative head. As such, the bodies of Ecuador's judicial branch now consisted of the National Court of Justice, provincial courts (created by the National Court), tribunals and judges, National Council of the Judicature, Public Defendants' Office, and State Attorneys' Office. The 2008 Constitution also led to the creation of the Constitutional Court of Ecuador.

==== National Court of Justice ====
The National Court of Justice seats 21 judges elected for a period of 9 years. They are elected by the Judiciary Council based on a merits contest held by that office. They are the final stage of any judicial process serving as a Court of Cassation and create binding precedent based on Triple Reiterative Rulings from the Chambers of the Court. The President of the Court is elected among the members of the Court for a Period of three years, representing the Judicial Branch before the State.

===== List of presidents =====
President	Period
José Vicente Troya Jaramillo	2008–2011
Carlos Ramírez Romero	2011–2012
Carlos Ramírez Romero	2012–2015
Carlos Ramírez Romero	2015–2018
Paulina Aguirre Suárez	2018–present

==== Judiciary Council ====
The administrative branch of the judicial power consists of the Judiciary Council. The Council is formed by 9 Vocals who are elected by the Branch of Transparency and Social Control, which is formed by the Control Authorities of the State. The Vocals are elected also by a merits contest and it shall be formed by six experts in law and 3 experts in management, economics and other related areas. However, after the National Referendum that took place on 5 May 2011 led to the passing of a proposition impulsed by the government, the Judiciary Council changed its formation by making a constitutional amendment. Currently, a Tri-Party Commission is serving as a Transitional Council with delegates from the Legislative, Executive and Transparency Branch, in order to reform the broken judicial system of the country.

=== Constitutional Court of Ecuador ===
The Constitutional Court of Ecuador does not exercise legal revision, but rather constitutional control of situations where constitutional rights are violated. Also they are the sole body in the State to interpret what the Constitution says.

==== List of presidents ====
President	Períod
Patricio Pazmiño Freire	2008–2015
Alfredo Ruiz Guzmán	2015–2018
Hernán Salgado Pesántes	2019–2024
Daniel Noboa	2025–present

As of 2025, the court has the following members:

- Jhoel Escudero Soliz
- Karla Andrade Quevedo
- Jorge Benavides Ordoñez
- Alejandra Cárdenas Reyes
- Raul Llasag Fernández
- Alí Lozada Prado
- Richard Ortiz Ortiz
- Claudia Salgado Levy
- Jose Luis Terán Suarez

== Executive branch ==
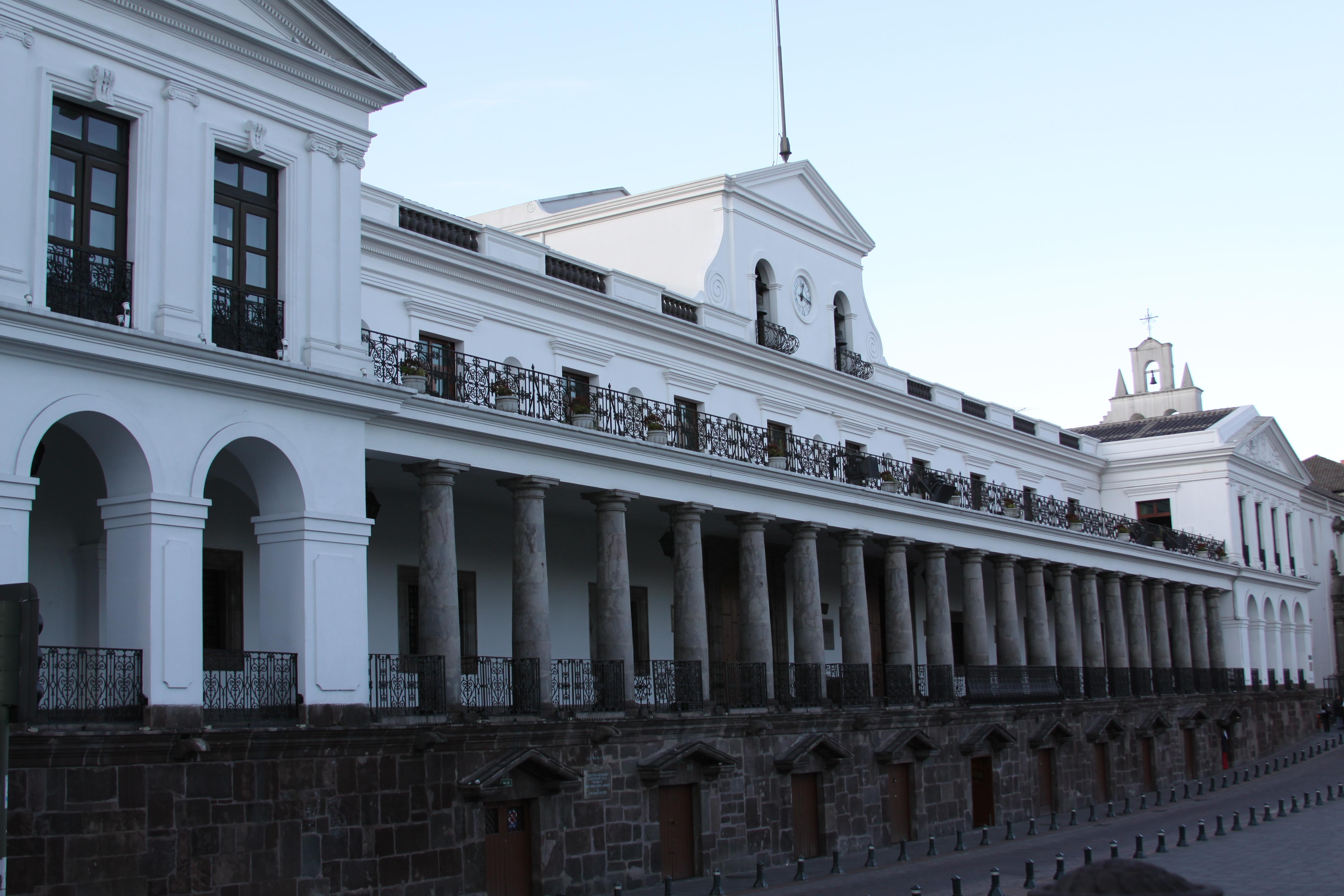
Carondelet Palace, seats the executive power.

=== Structure ===
The executive branch includes 28 ministries. Provincial governors and councilors, like mayors, aldermen and parish boards, are directly elected. Congress meets throughout the year except for recess in July and December. There are 20 seven-member congressional committees.

=== Presidency ===
The President and Vice-President are elected on the same ticket by popular vote for a four-year term.

==== Controversy surrounding Lucio Gutiérrez ====
On 20 April 2005, by an act of Congress, Lucio Gutiérrez was dramatically removed from office. The last election was held on 20 October 2002 and a runoff election on 24 November 2002 (with the next one to be held in 2006 per the four-year term limits).

Former Vice-President Alfredo Palacio assumed the presidency on 20 April 2005 after Congress removed Lucio Gutiérrez amid escalating street protests precipitated by growing criticism of Gutiérrez's Supreme Court appointments.

==== Presidency of Rafael Correa ====
A presidential election was held on 15 October and 26 November 2006. Rafael Correa defeated Álvaro Noboa in a run-off election, or second and final round. Correa won with 56.8% of the vote. There was an attempted coup against President Rafael Correa in 2010. The Economist described Correa as "a left-wing populist", while The Washington Post has characterized Correa's ideological approach as being "economically populist, socially conservative, [and] quasi-authoritarian".

Rafael Correa's three consecutive terms (from 2007 to 2017) were followed by Lenín Moreno's four years as president (2017–21).

==== Current officeholders ====
The 11 April 2021 election run-off vote ended in a win for conservative former banker, Guillermo Lasso, taking 52.4% of the vote compared to 47.6% of left-wing economist Andrés Arauz, supported by exiled former president, Rafael Correa. Previously, President-elect Lasso finished second in the 2013 and 2017 presidential elections. On 24 May 2021, Guillermo Lasso was sworn in as the new President of Ecuador, becoming the country's first right-wing leader in 14 years.

On 15 October 2023, center-right candidate Daniel Noboa won the run-off of the premature presidential election with 52.3% of the vote against leftist candidate Luisa González. On 23 November 2023, Daniel Noboa was sworn in as Ecuador’s new president. In April 2025, President Daniel Noboa won the run-off round of Ecuador's presidential election, with Maria Jose Pinto as vice president, meaning he will now serve a full four-year term.

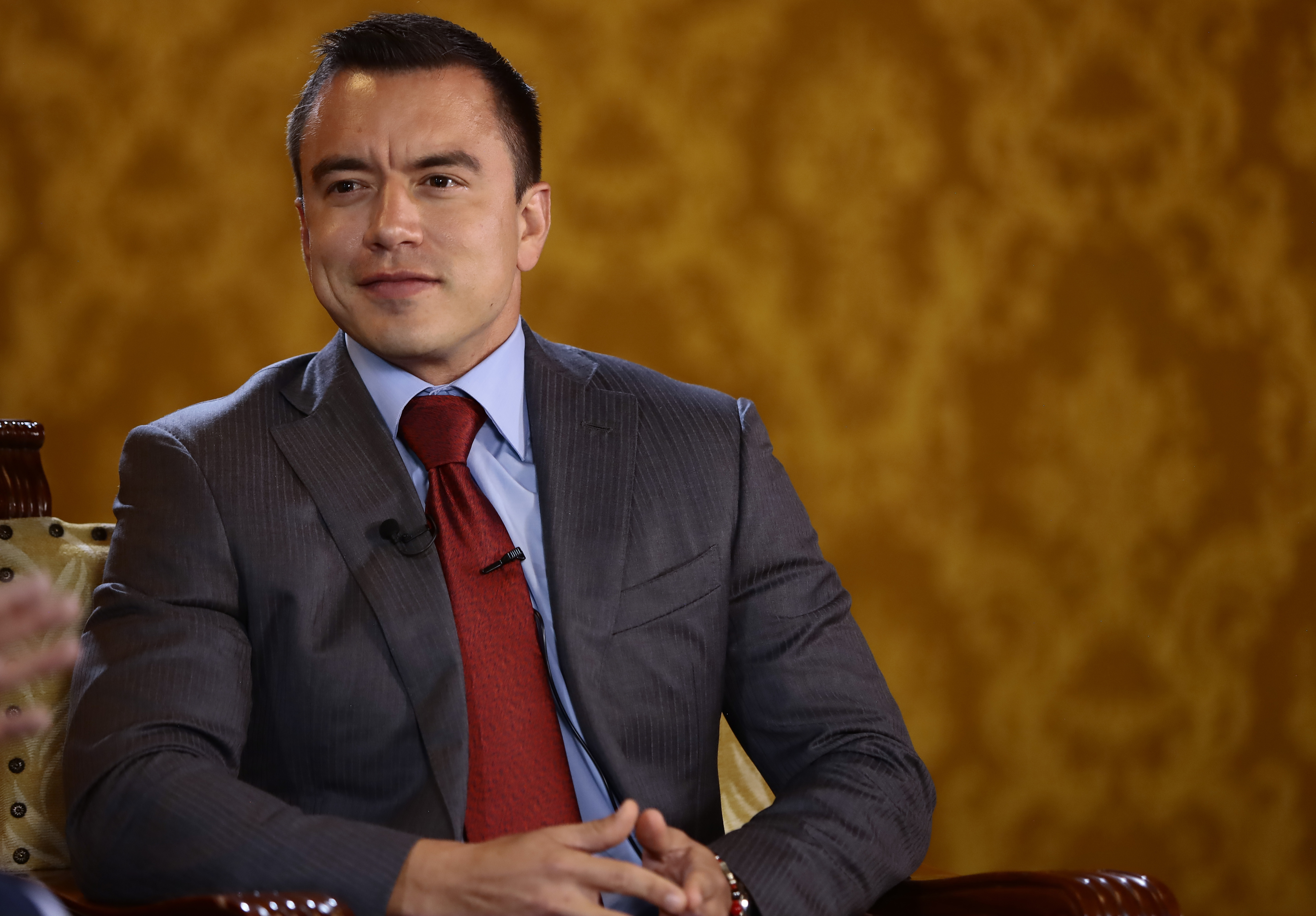
President of Ecuador since 2023 , Daniel Noboa

Main office-holders
Office	Name	Party	Since
President	Daniel Noboa	National Democratic Action (Ecuador)	23 November 2023
Vice President	Maria Jose Pinto	National Democratic Action (Ecuador)	24 May 2025

== Legislative branch ==
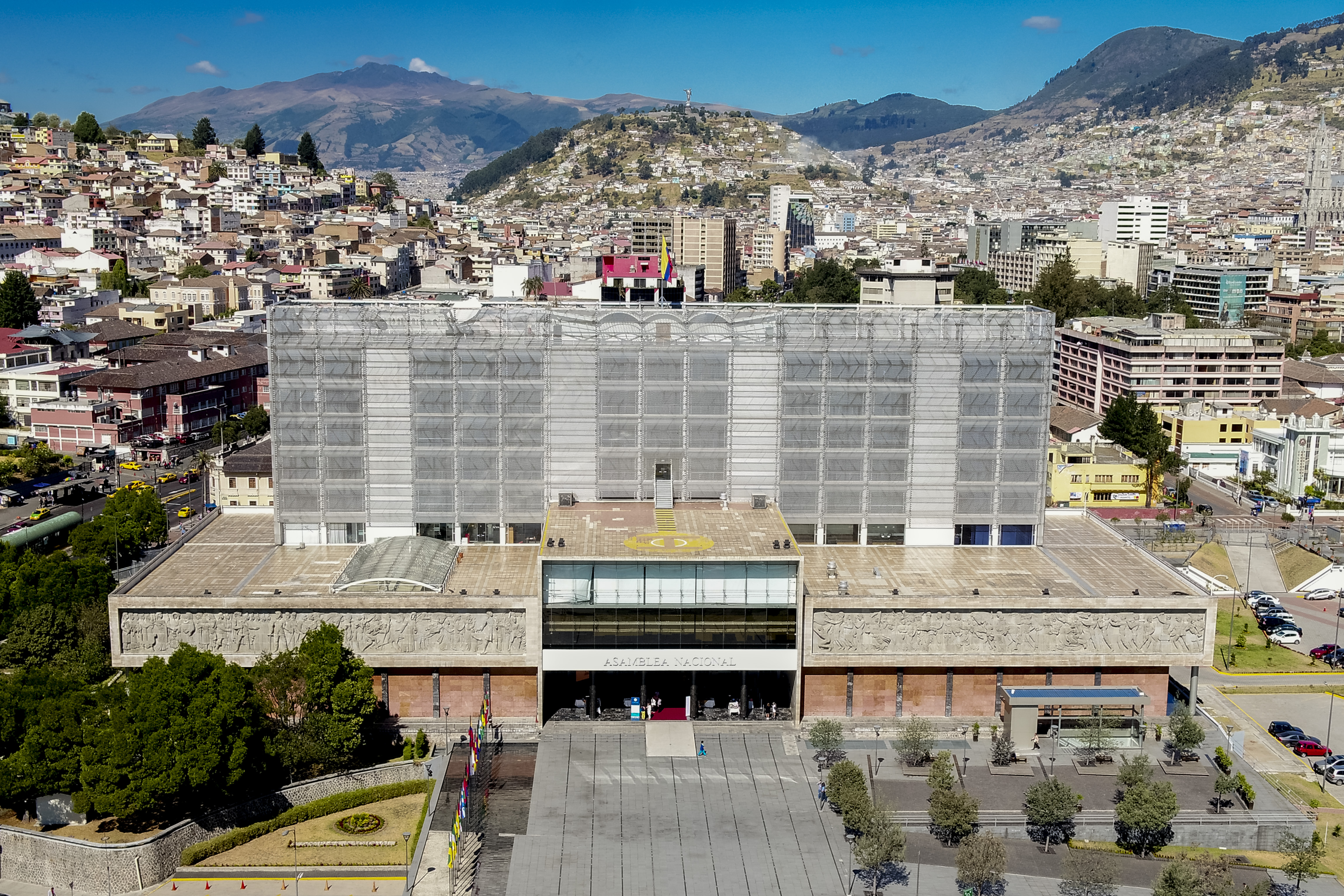
National Assembly

Ecuador has a unicameral National Assembly (Asamblea Nacional in Spanish), and it has 137 primary (seat-holding) members (all of whom are elected by popular vote to serve four-year terms). It is based on provincial constituencies, but it also has members coming from a national list and it has members representing the emigrant community.

=== History ===
On 29 November 2007, the Ecuadorian Constituent Assembly dismissed Congress on charges of corruption and then assumed legislative powers for itself. The Constituent Assembly then proposed a new National Assembly, which is the current institution.

== Administrative divisions ==
Ecuador is divided into 24 provinces: Azuay, Bolívar, Cañar, Carchi, Chimborazo, Cotopaxi, El Oro, Esmeraldas, Galápagos Islands, Guayas, Imbabura, Loja, Los Ríos, Manabí, Morona-Santiago, Napo, Orellana, Pastaza, Pichincha, Santa Elena, Santo Domingo de los Tsáchilas, Sucumbíos, Tungurahua, Zamora-Chinchipe Santa Elena Province.

== Legal system ==
Ecuador's legal system is based on the civil law system. Ecuador recently accepted compulsory International Court of Justice jurisdiction.

== Female representation in the Assembly ==
In 1979, there was no female representation. By 1984, there was only 4.2% of female representation with three deputies. In 1986, the number was reduced to one female parliamentarian.

Between 1988 and 1996, the average percentage of female representation was around of 5%. The following trends occurred:

- 1998: 13%
- 2003: 18%
- 2006: 26%
- 2007: 35%
- 2009: 29%
- 2013: 42%

In 2017, the leadership was led by three women: Gabriela Rivadeneira (President), Rosana Alvarado (First Vice-President) and Marcela Aguiñaga (Second Vice-President).

== International organization participation ==
Ecuador or Ecuadorian organizations participate in the following international organizations:

- Bolivarian Alliance for the Americas (ALBA)
- Andean Community of Nations (CAN)
- Community of Latin American and Caribbean States (CELAC)
- Economic Commission for Latin America and the Caribbean (ECLAC)
- Food and Agriculture Organization (FAO)
- Group of Eleven (G-11), Group of 77 (G-77)
- Inter-American Development Bank (IADB)
- International Atomic Energy Agency (IAEA)
- International Bank for Reconstruction and Development (World Bank)
- International Civil Aviation Organization (ICAO)
- International Criminal Court (ICC)
- International Chamber of Commerce (ICC)
- International Red Cross
- International Development Association (IDA)
- International Fund for Agricultural Development (IFAD)
- International Finance Corporation (IFC)
- International Hydrographic Organization (IHO)
- International Labour Organization (ILO)
- IMF
- International Maritime Organization (IMO)
- International Telecommunications Satellite Organization (Intelsat)
- Interpol
- IOC
- International Organization for Migration (IOM)
- International Organization for Standardization (ISO)
- International Telecommunication Union (ITU)
- International Trade Union Confederation (ITUC)
- Latin American Economic System (LAES)
- Latin American Integration Association (LAIA)
- Non-Aligned Movement (NAM)
- OAS
- Agency for the Prohibition of Nuclear Weapons in Latin America and the Caribbean (OPANAL)
- Organisation for the Prohibition of Chemical Weapons (OPCW)
- Permanent Court of Arbitration (PCA), RG
- UNASUR (headquarters)
- United Nations
- United Nations Conference on Trade and Development (UNCTAD)
- United Nations Educational, Scientific, and Cultural Organization (UNESCO)
- United Nations Industrial Development Organization (UNIDO)
- Universal Postal Union (UPU)
- World Federation of Trade Unions (WFTU)
- World Health Organization (WHO)
- World Intellectual Property Organization (WIPO)
- World Meteorological Organization (WMO)
- World Tourism Organization (WToO)
- World Trade Organization (WTO)

== See also ==
- Frente Único de Lucha Campesina (1978)
- List of heads of state of Ecuador
- 1830 Constitution of Ecuador
- 2008 Constitution of Ecuador
- Censorship in Ecuador
- 2025 Ecuador protests
