= Paulina Aguirre =

Paulina Aguirre may refer to:

- Paulina Aguirre (politician) (born 1958), Ecuadorian politician
- Paulina Aguirre (musician) (fl. 1995-present), Ecuadorian singer-songwriter
