= María Angélica Barreda =

Argentine lawyer (1887–1963)

Maria Angélica Barreda
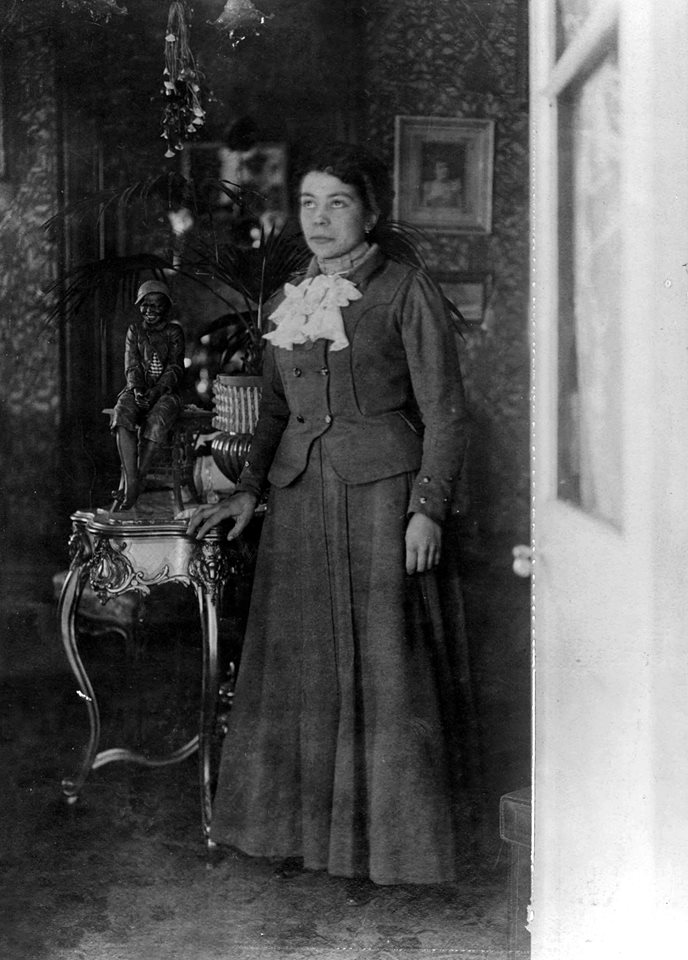
- Barreda in 1910
- Born: 15 May 1887; La Plata, Argentina
- Died: 21 July 1963 (aged 76); La Plata, Argentina
- Citizenship: Argentina
- Occupation: Lawyer

María Angélica Barreda (15 May 1887 – 21 July 1963) was an Argentine lawyer. She became in 1910 the first woman admitted to practice law in Argentina. She graduated from the National University of La Plata, receiving her degree on 28 December 1909.

in 2023, at the University of Buenos Aires, commemorative plaques were erected to remember two significant female lawyers in Argentina: Dr. María Angélica Barreda, the first woman lawyer in Argentina, graduated from the UNLP, and Dr. Celia Tapias, the first woman lawyer to graduate from the UBA. She was of African descent.
