= Obdulia Luna =

First Ecuadorian woman to obtain a law degree

Obdulia Romelia Luna Luna (? – 1980) was the first Ecuadorian woman to obtain a law degree. She graduated on June 15, 1928, at the university of Guayaquil. She worked as secretary of the first Chamber of the Superior Court of Justice of Guayaquil.
