= Maria Rita Soares de Andrade =

Brazilian judge

Federal Judge (Portuguese: Juíza Federal)
- In office 1967 – April 1974
- Appointed by: Humberto de Alencar Castelo Branco

Personal details
- Born: March 4, 1904 Aracaju, Sergipe, Brazil
- Died: April 1998 Rio de Janeiro, Rio de Janeiro, Brazil
- Education: Federal University of Bahia

Maria Rita Soares de Andrade (3 April 1904 – April 1998) was a Brazilian lawyer and judge, who became Brazil's first female federal judge in 1967. She was also the first woman to enter the Order of Attorneys of Brazil (Portuguese: Ordem dos Advogados do Brasil).

Andrade was appointed to the bench in 1967, sitting in the fourth federal judicial division (Portuguese: 4ª Vara Federal) of Rio de Janeiro state, and served until her mandated retirement in April 1974. She also served as a state and federal prosecutor.

Andrade was born and grew up in Aracaju, attending public schools until university. She studied law at the Federal University of Bahia, graduating in 1926. She was the only woman in her class and the third to complete a law degree at the university.

Andrade was active in feminist causes while at university and shortly thereafter. She founded the Sergipe chapter of the Women's University Union (Portuguese: União Universitária Feminina), later known as the Brazilian Association of University Women (Portuguese: Associação Brasileira de Mulheres Universitárias).
