= Rosa Rojas Castro =

- Born: 29 June 1919; Tocaima, Colombia
- Died: 22 October 1959 (aged 40); Bogotá, Colombia
- Other names: Rosita Rojas Castro
- Occupation: attorney
- Years active: 1943–1959

Rosa Rojas Castro (29 June 1919 – 22 October 1959) was the first Colombian woman to obtain a doctorate and first woman lawyer in the country. She is remembered as a pioneer who opened higher education and professional careers to women.

== Biography ==
Rosa Rojas Castro was born on 29 June 1919 in Tocaima, in the Cundinamarca Department, located in central Colombia. After earning a bachelor's degree in literature at the Alice Block Institute in Bogotá in 1937, she enrolled in legal courses at the Universidad Externado de Colombia. When she completed her doctorate in law and political science on 14 June 1942, she became the first woman in the country to earn a university degree. Though she completed the requirements to become a lawyer, a lawsuit was filed challenging her right to practice law, using the argument that if women had no political identity, they could not act on behalf of the public. Her professors served as her legal team and successfully argued that women could hold public office, confirming that she was the first woman lawyer in the country. On 1 July 1943, she was appointed to serve as the Third Judge of the Bogotá Circuit of the Superior Court.

The controversy over Rojas' appointment was carried in local newspapers and on the radio, galvanizing professional women to form the Unión Femenina de Colombia (UFC) (Women's Union of Colombia) in 1944 to fight for equal rights and opportunity for women. She worked in the Penal Courts from 1943 to 1947 and simultaneously taught at the Universidad Javeriana until 1945. Then in 1947, she was appointed as the Judge of First Instance for the Criminal Court of Facatativá, where she served until her death on 22 October 1959 from encephalitis. She is remembered as one of the pioneering women who opened higher education and professional careers to women in Colombia.
