= Censorship in Ecuador =

Censorship in Ecuador refers to all actions which can be considered as suppression in speech in Ecuador. In the Freedom of the Press Report 2016 by Freedom House, the press in Ecuador is classified as "not free". The 2016 World Press Freedom Index by Reporters Without Borders placed Ecuador in the "noticeable problems" category for press freedom, ranking the country 109 out of 180.

== Law ==
Ecuador’s Organic Law on Communications was passed in June 2013. The law recognizes a right to communication. Media companies are required to collect and store user information. “Media lynching”, which appears to extend to any accusation of corruption or investigation of a public official—even those that are supported with evidence, is prohibited. Websites bear “ultimate responsibility” for all content they host, including content authored by third parties. The law creates a new media regulator to prohibit the dissemination of “unbalanced” information and bans non-degreed journalists from publishing, effectively outlawing much investigative reporting and citizen journalism. Human rights organizations fear that the new law will stifle critical voices in the media, due to its vague wording, arbitrary sanctions, and the threat of civil and criminal penalties.

The government also created the Superintendence of Information and Communication (SUPERCOM) and the Council for the Regulation and Development of Information and Communication (CORDICOM), which "imposed a range of vaguely worded content restrictions".

Online, standard defamation laws apply to content posted. Attempts to censor statements made in times of heightened political sensitivity have been reported, as have alleged instances of censorship via the overly broad application of copyright to content critical of the government. Lawsuits have been filed against digital news sites for comments critical of the government. In order to utilize the services provided by cybercafes, the national secretary of telecommunications, SENATEL, requires that users register with the following information: full name, phone number, passport number, voting certificate number, email address, and home address.

Though originally the constitution allowed freedom of speech and in the press, a 2014 amendment regarded communication in Ecuador as a "public service", potentially allowing the government to become more involved in what is disseminated in the media.

== Areas of censorship ==
=== Media ===
Since the establishment of the Organic Law on Communications in 2013, "Ecuador’s media regulator, known as SUPERCOM, has issued sanctions in more than 300 cases against media outlets". SUPERCOM and CORDICOM also persecuted numerous figures in the media for not following "vaguely worded content restrictions". Media organizations were punished by the government for not disseminating "accomplishments made by (the) administration", for not using original government titles and for not publishing in formats enforced by the government. Media outlets are also susceptible to low advertising profits due to laws prohibiting how many advertisements are placed in non-official outlets and because advertisers fear reprisals by the government for providing advertisement funds to independent outlets.

In 2015, a 49% stake of El Tiempo was purchased by a public newspaper that often praised President Correa.

Lenín Moreno’s four years as president (2017-21) defused much of the tension between the government and privately owned media after Rafael Correa’s three consecutive terms (from 2007 to 2017).

=== Internet ===
In its Freedom on the Net 2016 report, Freedom House gives Ecuador a "freedom on the net status" of "partly free".

There is no widespread blocking or filtering of websites in Ecuador and access to blogs and social media platforms such as Facebook, Twitter, and YouTube is generally free and open. Diverse sources of national and international information are available via the Internet. Anonymous communication, encrypted communications, and the use of security tools is not prohibited.

There were no government restrictions on access to the Internet or credible reports that the government monitored e-mail or Internet chat rooms. However, on 11 July 2012 the government passed a new telecommunications regulation, requiring that Internet service providers fulfill all information requests from the superintendent of telecommunications, allowing access to client addresses and information without a judicial order.

Self-censorship of comments critical of the government is encouraged. In January 2013, for example, President Correa called for the National Secretary of Intelligence (SENAIN) to investigate two Twitter users who had published disparaging comments about him, an announcement which sent a warning to others not to post comments critical of the president. After receiving criticism from the government, news site La Hora indefinitely suspended the reader comments section on its website. At the president’s request, the comments section was shut down completely. Print and digital news outlet El Comercio faced similar pressure related to its readers’ comments and the comments section was ultimately disabled after President Correa sent a letter of complaint. While there are no official constraints on organizing protests over the Internet, warnings from the president stating that the act of protesting will be interpreted as "an attempt to destabilize the government" have undoubtedly discouraged some from organizing and participating in protests.

=== Non-governmental associations ===
Fundamedios, an Ecuadorian non-governmental association (NGO), was notified by the government in 2015 that it was making proceedings to dissolve the NGO for allegedly becoming "a political actor instead of an impartial observer of the country’s communications environment". The move was later reversed.
