= Trinidad María Enríquez =

Peruvian teacher (1846–1891)

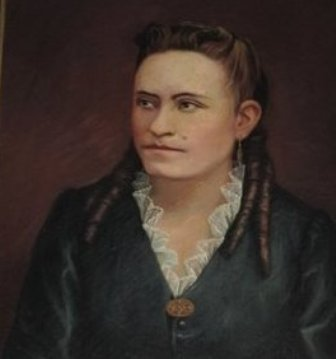
- Born: Trinidad Josefa María Enríquez Ladrón de Guevara; 5 June 1846; Cusco, Peru
- Died: 20 April 1891 (aged 44); Lima, Peru
- Other name: Trinidad María Enríquez Ladrón de Guevara
- Occupations: women's rights and education activist
- Years active: 1860–1891
- Known for: first woman to earn a university degree

Trinidad María Enríquez (5 June 1846 – 20 April 1891) was a Peruvian teacher and student. After completing the only education available to her, she founded a school to teach other girls and complete the necessary requirements to enter university. Appealing to the president, she was granted the right to attend if an examination proved she was adequately prepared. Passing her review, Enríquez completed courses at the National University of Saint Anthony the Abbot in Cuzco, where she became the first Peruvian woman to earn a university degree in 1878. Though she graduated, she was denied a license to practice law and fought her case through the legislature and court systems until her death in 1891.

== Early life ==
Trinidad María Josefa Enríquez Ladrón de Guevara was born on 5 June 1846 in Cusco to Cecilia Ladrón de Guevara y Castilla and Marcelino Enríquez. Her parents were well to do and on her mother's side of the family, she descended from Túpac Amaru per historian Horacio Villanueva Urteaga. She enrolled at El Colegio de señoritas "Educandas" (The Educandas Preparatory School for Girls) and excelled at her studies. At the time, there were no higher education opportunities for women and there were no schools offering a complete high school education for the final two years of study. Custom decreed that women were destined to become wives and mothers. The only training offered was restricted to upper class women and focused on preparing them with light reading, sewing and music to take their place in society.

== Career ==
By the age of eleven, Enríquez was teaching geography courses at Educandas. She founded a women's school, known as the Colegio Superior para Mujeres (High School for Women), on 1 June 1870. Included in her curricula were courses to prepare her to take the university entrance examinations, like analytical reading, arithmetic, Castilian grammar and lexicography, hygiene, and universal history, among others. Enríquez based the courses she offered on the requirements needed to attain entrance to university. Society was divided upon whether such education was necessary for women and after three years, she was forced to close the school.

Wanting to pursue higher education and become a lawyer, Enríquez applied for the university, after obtaining a governmental decree allowing her to take the entrance examinations. The decree, issued on 3 October 1874 required that her independent study for two years at her own school be validated, and if found acceptable, authorized her to enter any national university. From 20 to 29 April 1875, she was examined by a jury to determine her preparedness. The evaluations were published and much commented upon in the regional newspapers, but Enríquez was given high marks in the tests and allowed to enter university. She enrolled in the National University of Saint Anthony the Abbot in Cuzco and graduated in 1878 with a bachelor's degree in jurisprudence, as the first woman university graduate in the country.

Forbidden by law to receive a license as an attorney, Enríquez appealed to the Peruvian Congress and the Judiciary. Though Mariano Felipe Paz Soldán, the Minister of Justice and Instruction was in favor of allowing women to enter the profession, others were not. The advent of the War of the Pacific in 1879, prevented the legislature from considering her request. On 5 October 1881, President Nicolás de Piérola issued a presidential authorization to allow Enríquez admission to the bar. She rejected the exception, on the basis that the law should allow any woman equal access to become a lawyer. After the war ended, the legislature took up Enríquez request again and after consulting with the Superior Courts of Justice in Lima denied her request in 1886.

In 1870, Enríquez had founded the Artisan Society of Cusco, which operated a night school for workers, teaching them to read and write and educating them about their rights under the law. She also founded and edited the journal La voz del Cusco (The Voice of Cusco), which was focused on issues effecting women and workers. The final decision of the courts on Lima was issued in 1891, by prosecutor Ricardo Espinoza, who denied the license on the basis that women lacked the physical strength and mental capacity to serve as professionals and that by granting them the rights to do so, they would become masculine.

== Death and legacy ==
Enríquez died on 20 April 1891 in Lima, from brain fever and was buried at the Cementerio de la Almudena in Cusco. Enríquez's persistence to enter university inspired other women and by 1908 a dozen other women had been allowed to enter university; however, the law faculty did not enroll another woman until 1913, when Rosa Pérez Liendo was allowed to begin her studies. In 1914, her portrait was hung in the main hall of the National University of Saint Anthony the Abbot. In 2005, Tania Gutiérrez Samanez published a biography Trinidad María Enríquez detailing her life and Trinidad María Enríquez, una abogada en los Andes (Trinidad María Enríquez, an attorney in the Andes) was published by Carlos Ramos Núñez and Martín Baigorria Castillo.
