= Esilda Villa =

Bolivian lawyer

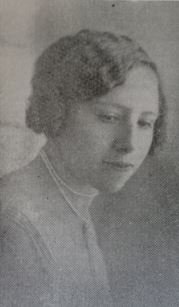
- Born: Esilda Villa Laguna Michel; 18 December 1909; Sucre, Bolivia
- Died: 11 May 1947 (aged 37); Oruro, Bolivia
- Other names: Esilda Villa Laguna
- Occupation: attorney
- Years active: 1929–1947

Esilda Villa (18 December 1909 – 11 May 1947) was the first woman to become a lawyer in Bolivia and was instrumental in the women's movement in the early twentieth century in her country. After passing her examination in 1928, she was refused a license to practice because women were not citizens at that time and could not complete the mandatory military service. International pressure was brought to bear and she finally earned her license in 1929. Ten years later when she passed examination to become a trial lawyer, the Supreme Court again refused to issue a license on the basis that women were incapable of practicing law. She successfully earned her license within a month and practiced until her untimely death from a traffic accident.

== Early life ==
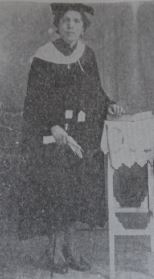
Esilda Villa Laguna Michel, 1st woman lawyer in Bolivia

Esilda Villa Laguna Michel was born on 18 December 1909 in Sucre, Bolivia to Adela Michel and Eduardo Villa Laguna. At the age of four, she entered primary school in the city of Potosí. Because of her excellent performance, she was able to skip her final year of primary schooling and at 12 years old, moved to Oruro, enrolling in the secondary school, Liceo "Pantaleón Dalence" de Señoritas (Pantaleón Dalence Women's Lyceum) graduating with a specialization in science and letters. Though she wanted to study law, there was no law school in Oruro which would accept women, so joining with other graduates of her generation, they founded the Facultad Libre de Derecho (Free Faculty of Rights). After studying for two years, on 2 June 1928, she appeared before the Superior Court of the District of Oruro, to take the examination for Procuradora de Causas. (Note: There is no English equivalent for this legal representative in the English court system. In cases assigned to a procurador, the duties include serving as a liaison for the lawyer, client and court by filing documents, collecting court orders and monitoring the case status. They are fully qualified in the law, not the equivalent of a paralegal, but do not defend or represent clients directly, instead facilitating the work of the attorney of record as a court intermediary. They are not employed directly by the court, serving solely as intermediaries.) Having never before had a woman apply, the court examined Villa and confirmed that she met the requirements.

When the Superior Court subsequently applied to the Government Prosecutor's Office for her certification as a procuradora, the application was denied on the basis that as a woman, she was not a citizen and could not be licensed without having completed her mandatory military service. In a Ministerial Resolution dated 10 October 1928 they refused to grant Villa a license. The action by the Ministry, began a long campaign by Villa for the advancement of women's rights in Bolivia. She brought numerous petitions before the Senate of Bolivia arguing not only for the political rights of women, but their civic right to engage in professions. Simultaneously, she appeared at the military barracks and demanded to be enrolled as a conscript. When the commandant refused, she demanded that he provide her with a certificate of disability, which allowed men to enter professions without fulfillment of military service. Her battle was carried in major newspapers throughout South America in Argentina, Chile, Cuba and Peru, among others, and she was often ridiculed for her masculine behavior in the humor section. One edition of the Chilean El Mercurio speculated whether she had a beard. The international attention, including a petition presented on her behalf to the General Assembly of the Pan American Union by the Inter-American Commission of Women, pressured the Prosecutor's Office to reverse their decision and grant her the title of procuradora on 2 March 1929.

== Career ==
News of Villa becoming the first woman lawyer of Bolivia was published in feminist journals and carried in the Bulletin of the Pan American Union. Over the next ten years, she worked with the attorneys and inmates in the Public Prison. During the Chaco War (1932–1935), she trained as a nurse and provided aid on the battlefield to the wounded. On 2 January 1938, Villa returned to the Superior Court in Oruro to request her examination as a trial lawyer (abogado). Again, she passed the examination, but when she applied for her new license, Villa was advised that under Article 15 of the Law of Judicial Organization confirmed by the Supreme Court of Bolivia, women, as well as people who were deaf or unable to speak were barred from becoming trial lawyers. Once again, she fought the ruling and was finally awarded her license on 22 January 1938.

Villa was involved in the founding of the children's wing of the Public Hospital and established a first aid room at the Escuela "María Quiroz". She campaigned for housing for the children of prison inmates who had no relatives to care for them and drafted legal opinions on the rights of children. In 1936, at the First Feminist Congress of Bolivia, held in Cochabamba, she delivered two papers, one which advocated for paternity investigations to confirm support for children by their fathers and another which argued that the law should protect children. She favored legal protection for single mothers allowing them to serve as guardians of their own children, child support by absent fathers, and access to education and health care. In July 1946, when the coups d'état overthrew the presidency of Gualberto Villarroel, Villa heard an announcement on the radio pleading for medical supplies for people wounded in the rebellion. She organized supplies and medical aid to be shipped to citizens in La Paz over the Bolivian Railway system.

== Death and legacy ==
Villa died on 11 May 1947, in a car accident when returning from the dedication of a monument to the victims who died in the revolt of 20 November 1944, in Oruro and a tribute in her honor was held at the La Paz Cathedral.
