= Celia Tapias =

Argentine lawyer

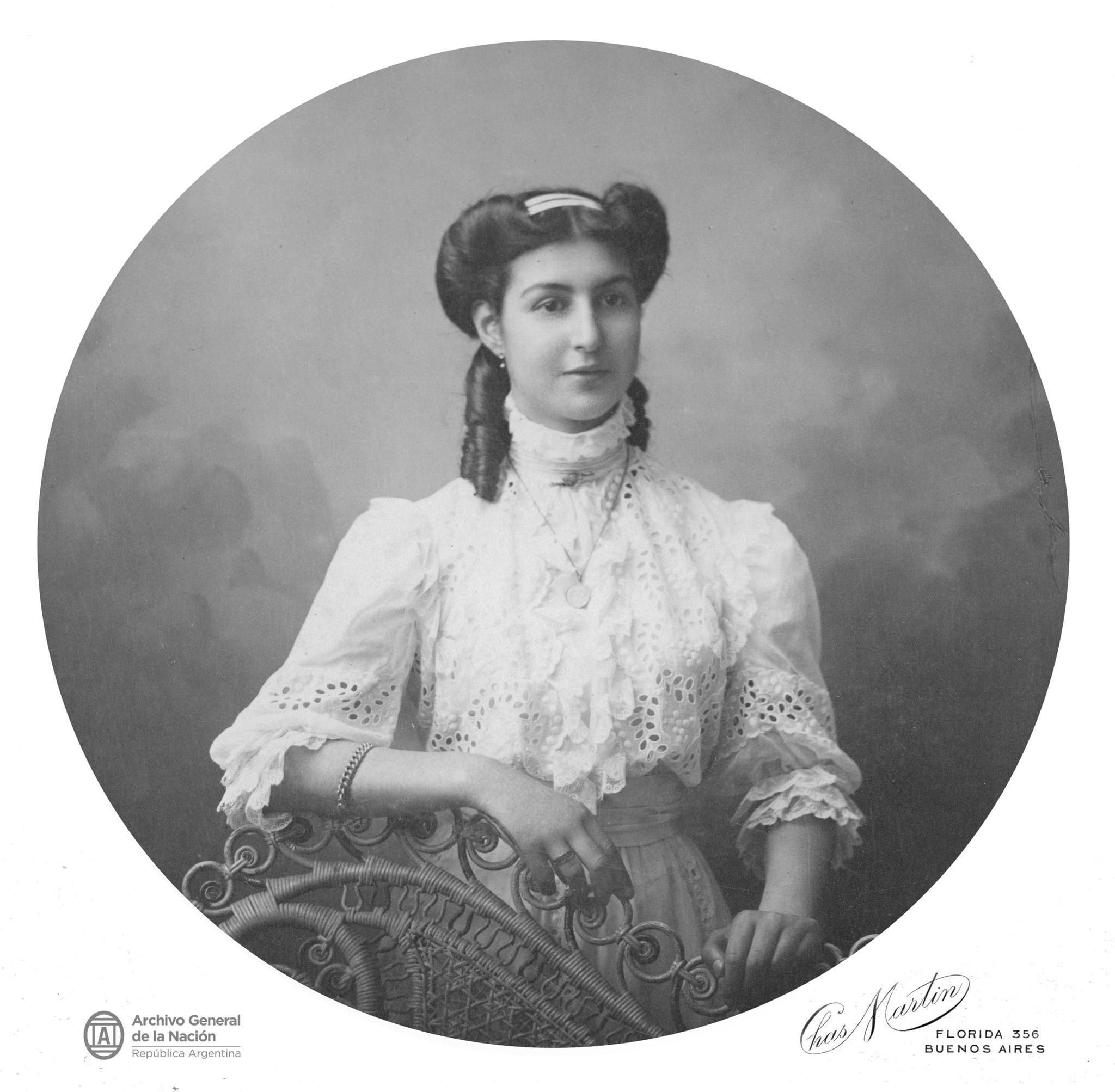
- Tapias in 1906
- Born: 21 December 1885; Buenos Aires, Argentina
- Died: 28 November 1964 (aged 78); Buenos Aires, Argentina
- Education: University of Buenos Aires
- Occupation: Lawyer

Celia Tapias (born in the city of Buenos Aires on 21 December 1885, died there on 28 November 1964) was the first female lawyer to practice law in the City of Buenos Aires and the second in her country.

== Life and work ==
She attended the baccalaureate classes in Buenos Aires, and after her graduation in 1904, she entered the Faculty of Law of the University of Buenos Aires (UBA). In 1910, she obtained the title of lawyer and on 12 August 1911, she went earned a doctorate with a thesis on Tutela dativa, becoming the first lawyer in the city of Buenos Aires.

She was a disciple of Alfredo Palacios, the lawyer who was the first socialist legislator in America. Tapias practiced her profession throughout her life, an activity that she complemented with teaching literature in normal schools 8 and 9 in the city of Buenos Aires.

in 2023, at the University of Buenos Aires, commemorative plaques were erected to remember two significant female lawyers in Argentina: Dr. María Angélica Barreda, the first woman lawyer in Argentina, graduated from the National University of La Plata (UNLP) and Dr. Celia Tapias, the first woman lawyer to graduate from the UBA. The plaques were located in the central hall of the headquarters on Avenue Corrientes.

== Notes ==
Before Celia Tapias, two other women started their law studies at the university, but one died and the other dropped out, making Tapias the first to graduate as a lawyer.
