= Frente Único de Lucha Campesina =

Frente Único de Lucha Campesina (FULC) was a coalition of popular movements in Ecuador, formed to campaign for the abolishment of Ley de Fomento Agropecuario and Ley de Seguridad Nacional, as well as demanding effective implementation of land reform. FULC consisted of FENOC, FEI and ECUARUNARI. FULC was founded on April 8, 1978, at a joint congress of the three organizations in Columbe.

FULC also demanded punishment of the culprits of killings of agricultural workers. Prior to the launching of FULC, in 1977, military forces had massacred agricultural workers at the Azatra sugar cane estate in the Cuenca.

In October 1980 the movement organized a National Peasant-Indigenous March, condemning the agricultural policies of the regime.

FULC later took the name Frente Único de Lucha Campesina e Indígena (FULCI).
