= Myrthes Gomes de Campos =

Brazilian lawyer

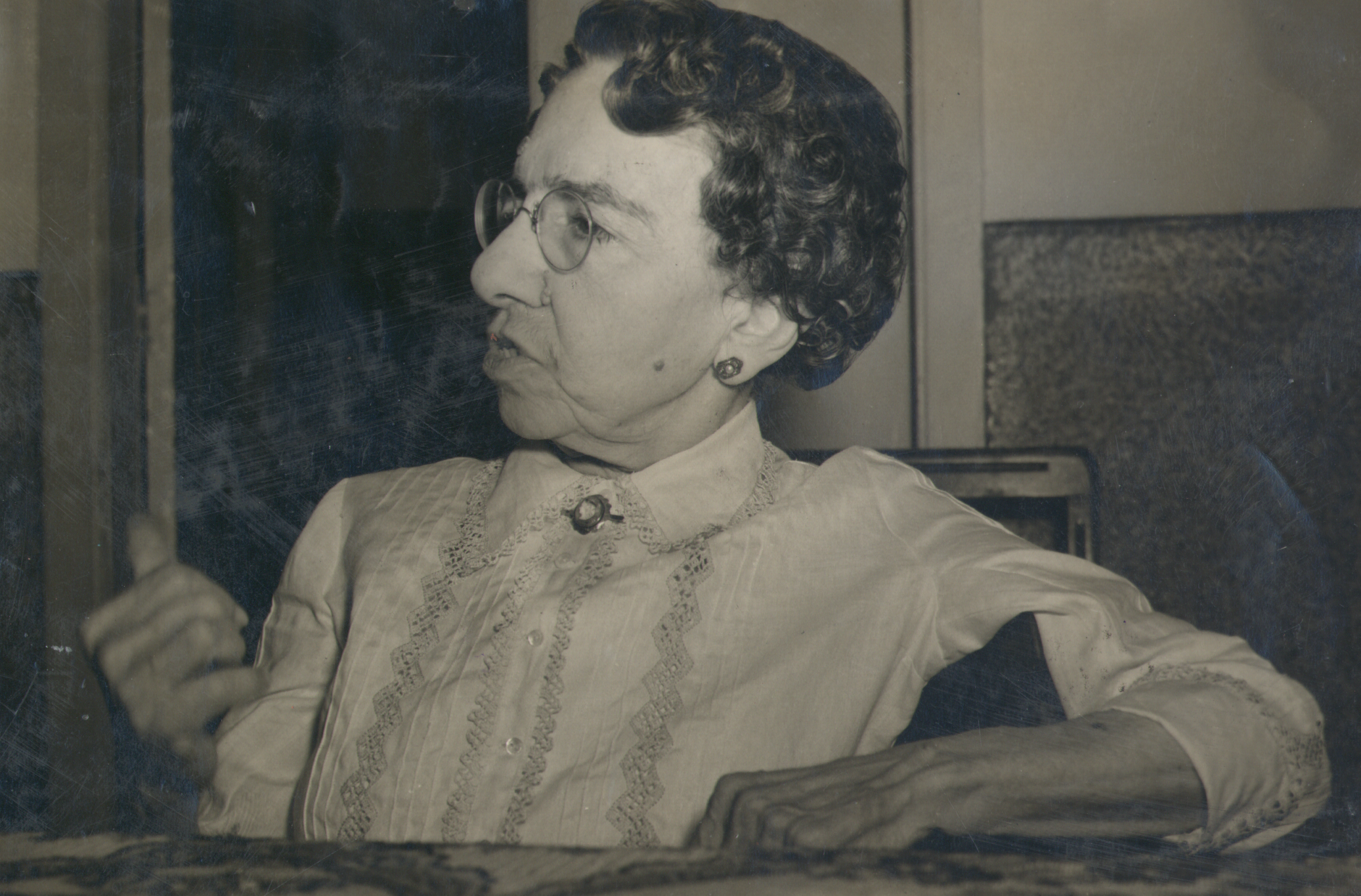
Myrthes de Campos.

Myrthes Gomes de Campos (1875-1965) was the first female lawyer in Brazil. She completed law school in 1898, and in 1906 she was admitted to the Instituto dos Advogados do Brasil (Institute of Brazilian Lawyers) and allowed to practice law.

== See also ==
- List of first women lawyers by nationality
