= Paulina Aguirre (politician) =

Ecuadorian jurist and lawyer

Paulina Aguirre Suárez
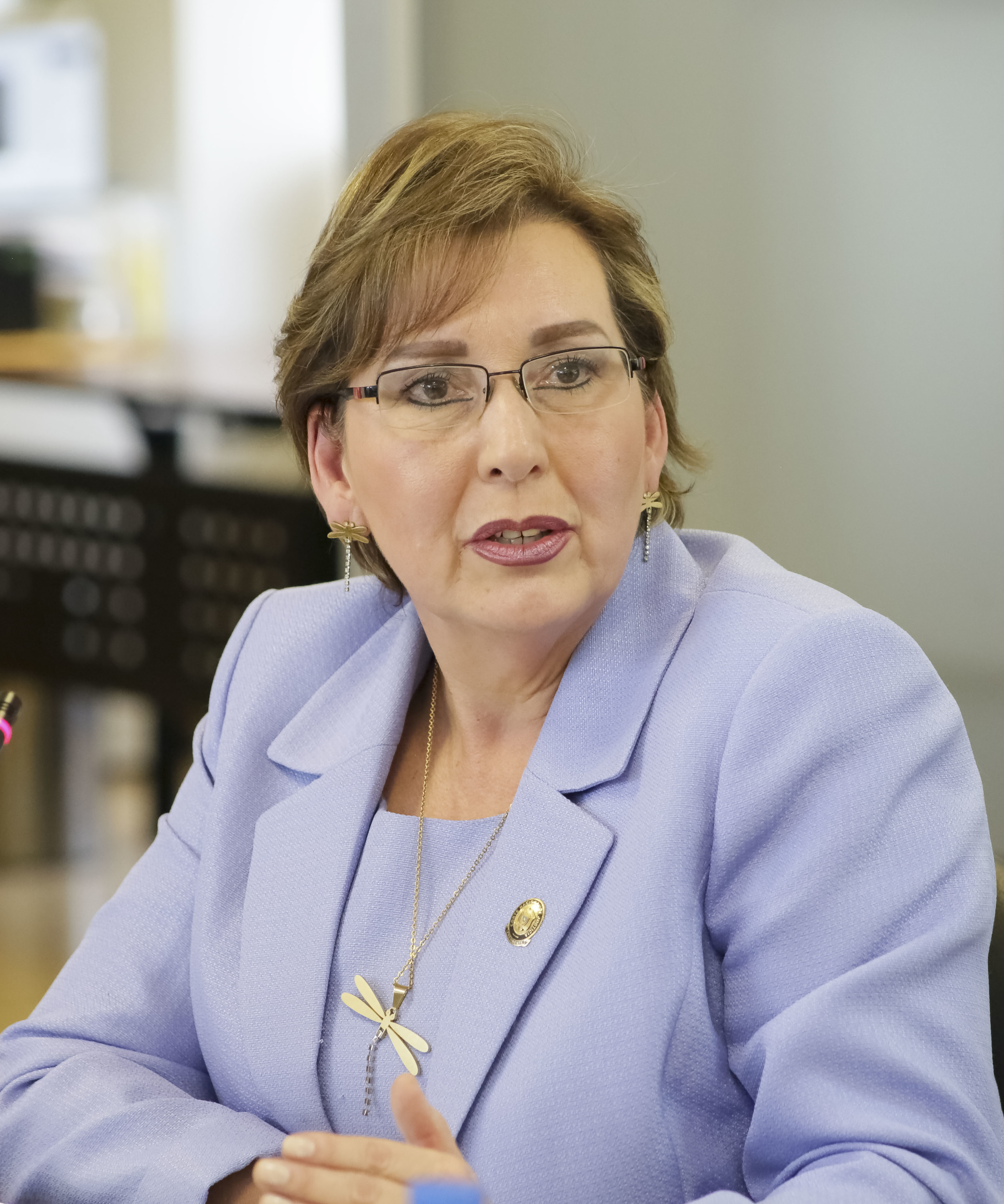
- Born: April 29, 1958 (age 68); Loja, Ecuador
- Education: National University of Loja
- Occupations: Judge, lawyer
- Office: President of the National Court of Justice
- Term: 26 January 2018 – 26 January 2021

Maria Paulina Aguirre Suárez (born 29 April 1958, in Loja, Ecuador) is an Ecuadorian judge and lawyer, who became president of the National Court of Justice on 26 January 2018. At the time, she had 30 years of judicial experience and was the first woman to hold the position. Her election was by unanimous decision of the 21 magistrates in the plenary session of the court.

== Early life and education ==
Suárez holds a doctorate of jurisprudence and a degree in law and social, political, and economic sciences from the National University of Loja. She is also studied as a Senior Specialist in Administrative Law at Simón Bolívar Andean University, and holds a postgraduate degree in Procedural Law, Specialist in Civil Procedural Law, and Master in Procedural Law with a mention in Civil Law from the Universidad Tecnológica Indoamérica.

== Career ==
Her positions before becoming President of the National court of Justice of the Republic include:

- rapporteur secretary of the Second Chamber of the Superior Court of Quito,
- secretary of the presidency of the Superior Court of Quito,
- judge of tenancy of Quito,
- Labor judge of Pichincha,
- minister and president of the First Labor Chamber, Childhood and Adolescence of the Superior Court of Quito,
- judge and president of the First Labor Court, Childhood and Adolescence of the Provincial Court of Pichincha
- president of the Labor Chamber of the National Court of Justice

Aguirre Suárez also served as executive director of the International Judicial Academy, and president of the Association of Judges of Ecuador.

She was appointed to the 2018–2021 term, replacing Carlos Ramírez.

At the end of her term, the National Court of Justice (CNJ) had resolved 6,964 cases.

Preceded by Carlos Ramírez	President of the National Court of Justice; 26 January 2018–26 January 2018	Succeeded by Iván Saquicela
