= Liberal Era (Ecuador) =

Overview of the history of Ecuador, 1895–1925

Republic of Ecuador República del Ecuador
- 1895–1925
- Flag (1900–1925) Coat of arms
- Motto: "Dios, patria y libertad"
- Anthem: Salve, Oh Patria
- Capital: Quito
- Government: Liberal presidential republic
- President
  - 1895–1901: Eloy Alfaro
  - 1901–1905: Leónidas Plaza
  - 1905–1906: Lizardo García
  - 1906–1911: Eloy Alfaro
  - 1911: Carlos Freile Zaldumbide
  - 1911: Emilio Estrada
  - 1911–1912: Carlos Freile Zaldumbide
  - 1912: Francisco Andrade Marín
  - 1912: Alfredo Baquerizo
  - 1912–1916: Leónidas Plaza
  - 1916–1920: Alfredo Baquerizo
  - 1920–1924: José Luis Tamayo
  - 1924–1925: Gonzalo Córdova
- Vice President
  - See list: See list (from Manuel Benigno Cueva to Alfredo Baquerizo)
- Legislature: National Congress
- History
  - Established: 5 June 1895
  - Disestablished: 9 July 1925
Preceded by	Succeeded by
Ecuador	Ecuador
- Today part of: Ecuador; Colombia; Peru

The Liberal Era (1895–1925) was a period during which Ecuador was governed by the Liberal Party. It began with the Liberal Revolution of 1895, led by Eloy Alfaro, who assumed office as Supreme Chief. The era ended in 1925 with the July Revolution, a military coup that removed the Liberals from power in response to a severe economic crisis.

Alfaro's administration sought to reduce the influence of the Catholic Church by reversing many of the privileges it had received during the conservative governments of President Gabriel García Moreno (1861–1875). Major reforms included the separation of church and state, the secularization of public education, and the legalization of civil marriage and divorce.

Catholic officials and their Conservative allies resisted these changes through political opposition, public denunciations, and armed uprisings.

== Liberal Era ==
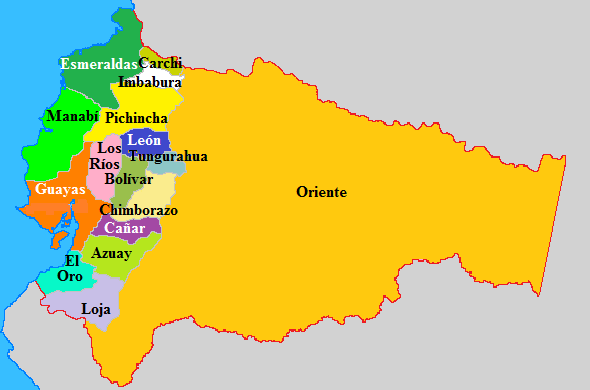
Ecuador in 1911

=== Early reforms ===
After the initial reforms of the Liberal Era in Ecuador, the Liberal Party achieved few subsequent accomplishments of comparable scale. In the Sierra, the entrenched system of debt peonage known as concertaje came under government regulation, though enforcement was weak. Imprisonment for debt, a key feature of the system, was formally abolished in 1918 under President Alfredo Baquerizo Moreno.

Limited social benefits for indigenous Ecuadorians and the coastal Montubio working class were overshadowed by major crises in the early 1920s. A severe economic downturn, triggered by the collapse of the global cacao market on which Ecuador's economy depended, caused widespread hardship. This was compounded by the government's violent repression of the emerging labor movement, most notably in the massacre of striking workers in Guayaquil on 15 November 1922.

=== Alfaro and the Civil Wars ===
The Liberal period was marked by political instability and frequent reliance on military interventions. The Liberal Revolution of 1895 began with a coup, and Eloy Alfaro returned to power in 1906 through another.

During Alfaro's first year as president, beginning in June 1895, Ecuador was engulfed in civil war. Clergy incited followers to rebel against the "atheistic alfaristas," a pejorative term for Alfaro's anticlerical supporters, while some clergymen themselves became victims of reprisals. Foreign-born bishops Pedro Schumacher of Portoviejo and Arsenio Andrade of Riobamba played key roles in organising resistance. The conflict was ultimately defused by Archbishop and historian Federico González Suárez, who persuaded the clergy to withdraw from direct political opposition, preventing a prolonged conflict.

=== Liberal rivalries ===
For nearly two decades, Alfaro and General Leónidas Plaza y Gutiérrez y Caviedes led rival factions of the Liberal Party, dividing radicals from moderates. Plaza was elected president in 1901 and served until 1905. In 1906, shortly after Plaza's chosen successor Lizardo García took office, Alfaro launched a coup d'état and returned to the presidency.

Alfaro was overthrown on 11 August 1911 after attempting to prevent his hand-picked successor Emilio Estrada from assuming office, citing Estrada's poor health. Estrada died of a heart attack on 21 December 1911, only months into his presidency. His death triggered renewed conflict between Alfaro and Plaza.

Alfaro returned from exile in Panama to lead a rebellion from Guayaquil against the interim government in Quito, commanded by Plaza. The rebellion collapsed within weeks. Alfaro was captured and transported to Quito via the railway he had helped build. On 28 January 1912, a mob stormed the prison, killing Alfaro and six of his commanders. Their bodies were dragged through the streets and publicly burned in an event known as the "Barbaric Bonfire." This led to the Concha Revolution in Esmeraldas Province (1913–1916), which was eventually suppressed by government forces.

=== Constitutional stability ===
Following the civil unrest, Plaza began a second presidential term on 1 September 1912. His administration initiated a rare period of constitutional stability with four consecutive transfers of power: Alfredo Baquerizo Moreno (1916–1920), José Luis Tamayo (1920–1924), and Gonzalo Córdova (1924–1925).

=== Rise of La Argolla ===
During this later phase of Liberal rule, political power was concentrated in a plutocracy of coastal banking and agricultural elites known as La Argolla ("the ring"), centred on the Commercial and Agricultural Bank of Guayaquil, led by Francisco Urbina Jado. The bank extended large loans to the state, issued its own currency, and became a dominant political force. According to historian Óscar Efren Reyes, its influence was so extensive that "candidates for president and his ministers, senators, and deputies had to have the prior approval of the bank."

Many of the bank's loans supported members of the Association of Agriculturists of Ecuador, a group of cacao growers that also received government subsidies. These funds, intended to promote an international cacao cartel, were reportedly diverted to private enrichment.

=== Economic crisis ===
La Argolla supported Liberal governments, but its financial practices contributed to economic decline. The Commercial and Agricultural Bank and others financed government deficits by issuing fiat money, fuelling inflation. The cacao industry was simultaneously devastated by plant diseases such as Witches’ Broom and Monilia pod rot, while competition from British colonies in Africa reduced Ecuador's market share. Declining global demand and prices during the Great Depression further weakened the economy.

The crisis hit the working class and rural poor especially hard. A general strike in Guayaquil on 15 November 1922 ended with the killing of hundreds of demonstrators by government troops, while a peasant rebellion in the Sierra in 1923 was also suppressed by the military.

=== July Revolution ===
President Gonzalo Córdova, closely associated with La Argolla, took office in 1924 following a disputed election. Popular unrest, continuing economic hardship, and Córdova's poor health created the conditions for the bloodless coup of 9 July 1925.

Unlike earlier interventions led by individual caudillos, the coup was carried out by the "League of Young Officers," a collective of reform-minded military leaders. Their agenda included establishing a central bank, implementing a progressive income tax, and replacing the Liberal–Conservative rivalry with new social and economic reforms. This marked the end of three decades of Liberal dominance in Ecuadorian politics.
