= 1912 in Ecuador =

- Decades: 1890s; 1900s; 1910s; 1920s; 1930s
- See also: Other events in 1912 · Timeline of Ecuadorian history

Events in the year 1912 in Ecuador.

== Incumbents ==
- President: Carlos Freile Zaldumbide until March 6, Francisco Andrade Marín until August 10, Alfredo Baquerizo until September 1, Leónidas Plaza

== Events ==
- January 4 - former President Eloy Alfaro returned to Ecuador and attempted another coup but was defeated, arrested and jailed by General and former President Leonidas Plaza.
- January 28 - a group of pro-Catholic soldiers supported by a mob, broke into the prison where Alfaro and his colleagues were detained and dragged them along the cobbled streets of the city center. This sparks the Concha Revolution.
- Ecuadorian presidential election, 1912

== Deaths ==
- January 28 - Eloy Alfaro, former President
