= 1901 Ecuadorian presidential election =

- 1901
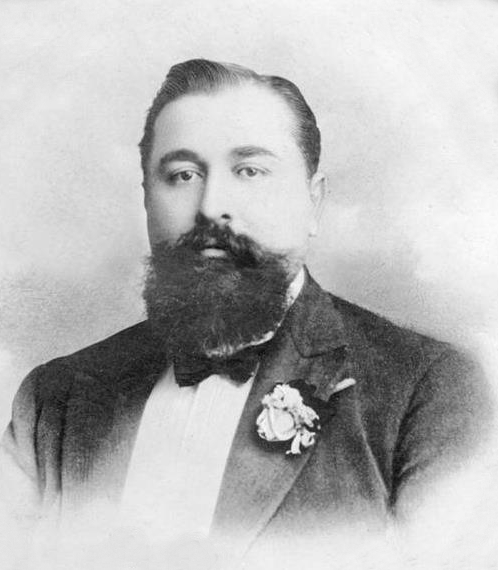

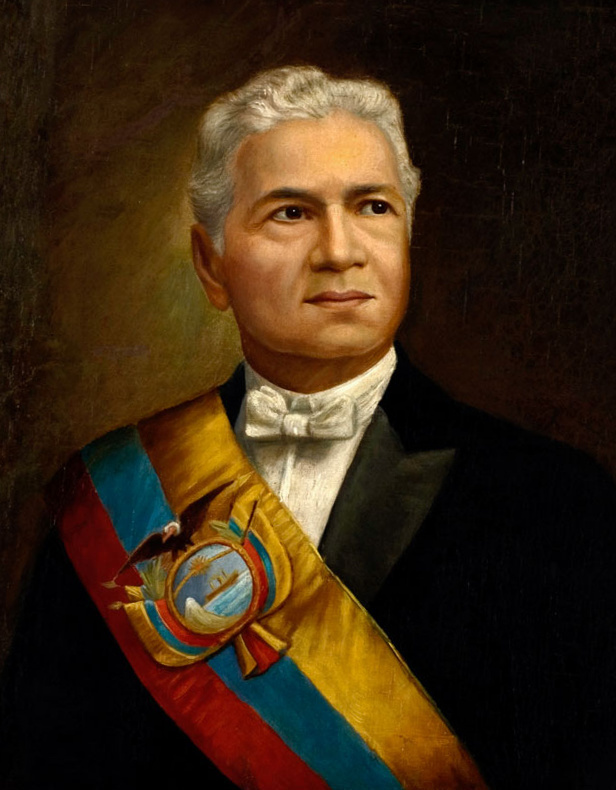
Nominee	Leónidas Plaza	Lizardo García
Party	Liberal	Liberal
Popular vote	65,781	7,915
Percentage	88.80%	10.69%
President before election
Eloy Alfaro
Elected President
Leónidas Plaza
Liberal

Presidential elections were held in Ecuador in 1901. The result was a victory for Leónidas Plaza, who received 89% of the vote.

== Results ==
Candidate	Party	Votes	%
Leónidas Plaza	Liberal Party	65,781	88.80
Lizardo García	Moderate Liberal	7,915	10.69
Manuel Franco	Radical Liberal	182	0.25
Other candidates		196	0.26
Total		74,074	100.00
Source: Nohlen, TSE
