= 1912 Ecuadorian presidential election =

- 1912
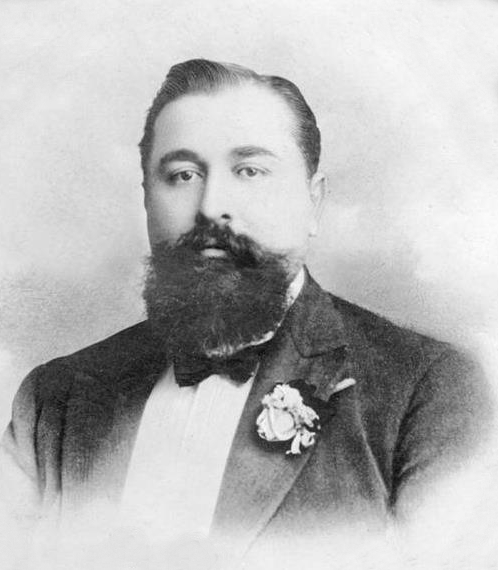
Nominee	Leónidas Plaza	Carlos R. Tobar
Party	Liberal	PC
Popular vote	62,374	754
Percentage	97.72%	1.18%
President before election
Francisco Andrade Marín
Elected President
Leónidas Plaza
Liberal

Presidential elections were held in Ecuador in 1912. The result was a victory for Leónidas Plaza, who received 98% of the vote.

== Results ==
Candidate	Party	Votes	%
Leónidas Plaza	Liberal Party	62,374	97.72
Carlos R. Tobar	Conservative Party	754	1.18
Gonzalo Córdova	Liberal Party	507	0.79
Other candidates		195	0.31
Total		63,830	100.00
Source: Nohlen, TSE
