= 1911 in Ecuador =

- Decades: 1890s; 1900s; 1910s; 1920s; 1930s
- See also: Other events in 1911 · Timeline of Ecuadorian history

Events in the year 1911 in Ecuador.

== Incumbents ==
- President: Eloy Alfaro until August 12, Carlos Freile Zaldumbide until September 1, Emilio Estrada Carmona until December 21, Carlos Freile Zaldumbide

== Events ==
- President Alfaro is removed from office. After a failed attempt to regain office, he is captured near Guayaquil and sent to Quito on a railroad built during his term in office. He is later exiled to Panama.

== Deaths ==
- October 9 - Antonio Borrero, President 1875-1876
- December - Emilio Estrada Carmona, President
