= Liberal Revolution of 1895 =

Process of political and economic transformation in Ecuador

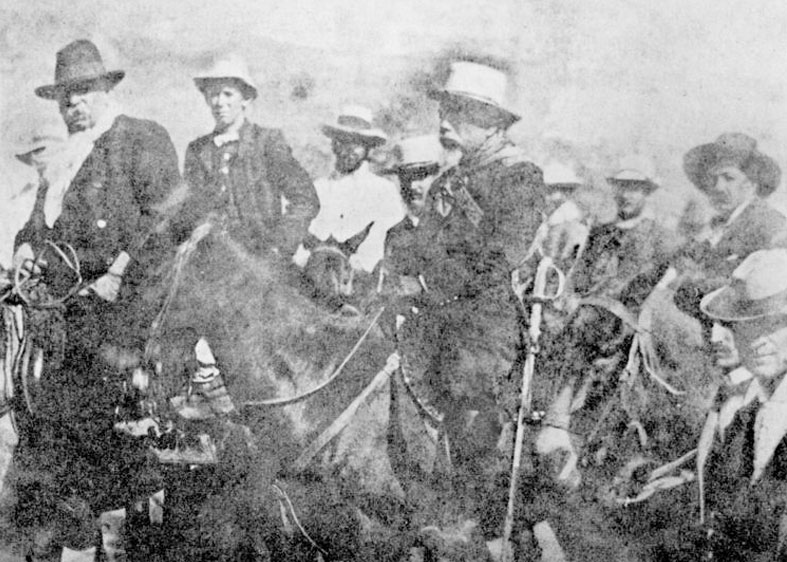
- Representation of the Battle of Chasqui, you can see the montoneros of Eloy Alfaro before the battle.
Date	5 June 1895 – 28 January 1912
Location	Ecuador
Result	Victory for the Liberals

Belligerents
Conservatives	Liberals

Commanders and leaders
Plácido Caamaño; Juan Manuel Triviño †; Ramón González Valencia; Pedro Nel Ospina; Manuel Antonio Franco †; Manuel Serrano Renda; Vicente Villamizar; Carlos Concha Torres; José María Sarasti; Pedro J. Montero (executed); Luciano Coral (executed); Pedro Lizarzaburu; Flavio Alfaro (executed); Medardo Alfaro (executed); Ulpiano Páez (executed); Emilio Terán (executed)	Eloy Alfaro (executed); Leonidas Plaza; Pompeyo Baquero; Luis Cordero Crespo; Lizardo García; Vicente Lucio Salazar; Emilio Estrada Carmona; Luis Vargas Torres; Tomás Larrea (executed)

Strength
6,000 soldiers	5,000 soldiers

Casualties and losses
8,000–15,000 dead	6,000–10,000 dead

The Liberal Revolution of 1895 took place in Ecuador, and was a period of radical social and political upheaval. The Revolution started on June 5, 1895 and ultimately resulted in the overthrow of the conservative government, which had ruled Ecuador for several decades, by the Radical Liberals, led by Eloy Alfaro. After the revolution, the new government legalized divorce, allowed religious freedom, and weakened the authority of the Church, which lost the land it held.

The Revolution is often seen as marking the birth of modern Ecuador, with a new power structure that favored the Liberal Party, and new infrastructure projects such as the construction of a railway line between Quito and Guayaquil.
