= 1905 Ecuadorian presidential election =

- 1905
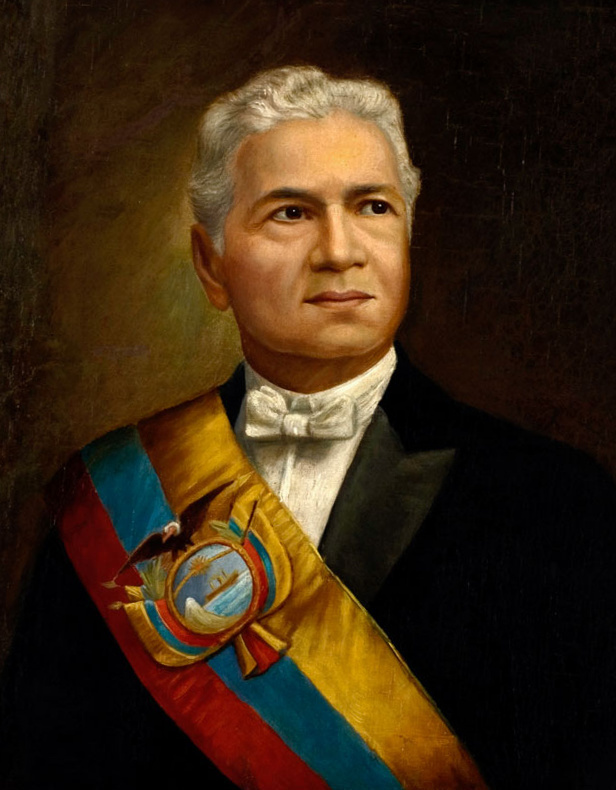
Nominee	Lizardo García	Ignacio Robles
Party	Liberal	Liberal
Popular vote	64,369	2,687
Percentage	93.01%	3.88%
President before election
Leónidas Plaza
Liberal
Elected President
Lizardo García
Liberal

Presidential elections were held in Ecuador in 1905. The result was a victory for Lizardo García, who received 93% of the vote.

== Results ==
Candidate	Party	Votes	%
Lizardo García	Liberal Party	64,369	93.01
Ignacio Robles	Liberal Party	2,687	3.88
Manuel Franco	Liberal Party	1,383	2.00
Other candidates		769	1.11
Total		69,208	100.00
Source: Nohlen, TSE
