= GHD =

GHD may refer to:

== Companies ==
- Good Hair Day, a British manufacturer of hair straighteners and other hair-care products
- Kintetsu Group Holdings, a Japanese conglomerate
- GHD Group, an international professional services company based in Australia

== Health and medicine ==
- Global Handwashing Day, an annual campaign
- Global Health Delivery Project, at Harvard University
- Growth hormone deficiency, a condition causing a lack of growth hormone

== Places ==
- Gillette Historic District, in Tulsa, Oklahoma, United States
- Guthrie Historic District (Guthrie, Oklahoma), United States

== Transport ==
- Gateshead Interchange, England, a station on the Tyne and Wear metro
- Garwa Road Junction railway station, Jharkhand, India
- Keilor Plains railway station, Victoria, Australia

== Other ==
- GHDs, colloquial term for hair straightening irons
- Good Humanitarian Donorship Principles, the standard for the Humanitarian Response Index
- Glute hamstring developers, a type of exercise equipment
