= Liberalism and radicalism in Ecuador =

This article gives an overview of political liberalism and radicalism in Ecuador. It is limited to liberal and radical parties with substantial support, mainly proven by having had representation in parliament. The sign ⇒ means a reference to another party in that scheme. (For inclusion in this scheme, it is not necessary that a party have labeled itself "liberal".)

== Introduction ==
Liberalism has been one of the dominant political forces in Ecuador since the late 19th century. The movement became divided and lost influence in the second half of the 20th century. The Alfarista Radical Front (Frente Radical Alfarista) and the Ecuadorian Radical Liberal Party (Partido Liberal Radical Ecuatoriana) are two small remnants of the traditional liberal current in the country. They supported separation of church and state.

== The timeline ==
=== From Liberal Party to Ecuadorian Radical Liberal Party ===
- 1878: Eloy Alfaro founded the Liberal Party (Partido Liberal)
- 1925: The party is renamed into Ecuadorian Radical Liberal Party (Partido Liberal Radical Ecuatoriano)
- 1978: A faction formed the ⇒ Radical Democratic Party

=== Radical Alfarist Front ===
- 1972: Radical liberals founded the Alfarista Radical Front (Frente Radical Alfarista)

=== Radical Democratic Party / Democratic Party ===
- 1978: Dissidents from the ⇒ Ecuadorian Radical Liberal Party founded the Radical Democratic Party (Partido Radical Demócrata), renamed the same year in Democratic Party (Partido Demócrata)
- 1990s: The party disappeared

== Liberal leaders ==
- Eloy Alfaro
- Luis Vargas Torres

== Liberal actions ==
- Liberal Revolution of 1895
- Concha Revolution (1912-1916)

== See also ==
- History of Ecuador
- Politics of Ecuador
- List of political parties in Ecuador
