= Mauricio Pozo (politician) =

Ecuadorian politician, banker, and economist

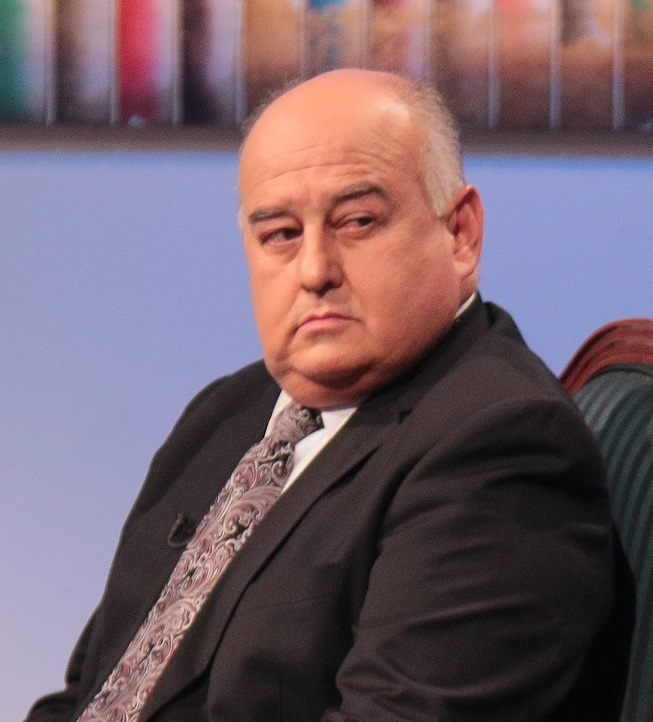

Mauricio Pozo Crespo (born January 18, 1959) is an Ecuadorian politician, banker and economist from Quito, Ecuador. He was the Minister of Economy and Finance from 2020 to 2021 under President Lenín Moreno and previously, from 2003 to 2004, under President Lucio Gutiérrez.

He was a vice-presidential candidate alongside Cynthia Viteri in the Ecuadorian 2017 general election.

== Background ==
Pozo graduated from high school in Caracas, Venezuela. He earned a BA in economics at Universidad Católica del Ecuador (PUCE) in 1985. In the same year he graduated magna cum laude at the Economics Institute in the University of Colorado. He continued his postgraduate studies at Notre Dame, Indiana, USA where he obtained a master's degree in economics in 1987.

He pursued various courses in finance and economics in USA and Europe. In 2010 he obtained a diploma from the Global Health Delivery Project at Harvard University, in Boston, Massachusetts, USA.

== Experience ==
Pozo has been president and member of boards of directors, of national and foreign companies, as well as in public Ecuadorian institutions such as the Stock Exchange, the Investments Committee of the Social Security Institute (IESS), Bank of Ecuador (BCE), BEDE, Deposit Guarantee Agency (Agencia de Garantía de Depósitos, AGD), and Inland Revenue Service (Servicio de Rentas Internas, SRI). He was economic adviser to and Chairman of the Monetary Board, 1988–1991.

He served as Governor at the IMF (International Monetary Fund), the World Bank, IDB (Inter-American Development Bank) and Principal Director of CAF – Development Bank of Latin America and the Caribbean. He worked as analyst for the Economist Intelligence Unit in London from 1998 to 2001.

Pozo was granted the Isabel la Católica Award awarded by King Juan Carlos I of Spain, in July 2004, and the Consular Excellence Award by the Honorable Consular Body of Quito, April 26, 2005. He has also been Dean and professor at PUCE and other universities. He has published numerous articles, analyses and books.

== Ministerial post ==
Mauricio Pozo was appointed Minister of Economy and Finance of Ecuador in January 2003, when Lucio Gutiérrez became president. Pozo was described as an "orthodox economist" who advocated dollarization of the national currency. He maintained a policy of using much of the country's oil revenues to repay debt and sought new loans from the IMF. He resigned his post on 1 June 2004, for reasons not clarified at the time. The austerity policies adopted by Pozo and Gutierrez were criticized by representatives of Indigenous people for their impact on poverty, but government supporters linked these policies to a 3.5% growth rate in 2003 and an inflation rate below 3%.
