= Ecuadorian Civil War of 1913–1916 =

Civil war fought in Ecuador

A map of Esmeraldas Province, where most of the fighting took place.

The Ecuadorian Civil War of 1913–1916, or Concha Revolution, was an uprising against Ecuadorian President Leónidas Plaza in the Esmeraldas Province. Much of the province was destroyed in the process, but the government was ultimately able to re-assert control.

== The Civil War ==
The civil war was an outcome of the assassination of liberal Ecuadorian leader Eloy Alfaro -- responsible for the Liberal Revolution of 1895 -- on January 28, 1912, in Quito. In the north of Ecuador, the citizens of Esmeraldas, especially the Afro-Esmeraldans, were loyal to the liberal cause and the ensuing struggle left many of the poorly armed blacks dead at the hands of government troops.

This uprising in support of Alfaro was against a more conservative wing of the Liberal party. Ecuadorian blacks contributed notably to the military effort and even formed the bulk of Alfaro’s army in the region. The Esmeraldan rebel army was led and funded by Colonel Carlos Concha Torres (1864–1919). This civil war left a bitter legacy in the region.

While the authors of Resort to war: a data guide to inter-state, extra-state, intra-state, and non-state wars, 1816-2007 state that the war ended in 1914, Paul Henderson states that it ended in 1916, when Carlos Concha was captured and held prisoner in Quito until his death in 1919.
