= Luis Vargas Torres =

Ecuadorian revolutionary, national hero and martyr

Colonel Luís Vargas Torres (1855 in Esmeraldas, Ecuador – March 20, 1887, in Cuenca, Ecuador) was an Ecuadorian revolutionary and national hero and martyr in the cause of liberalism.

== Biography ==
Vargas Torres was the son of José Vargas and Delfina Torres de la Carrera. Born in Esmeraldas, he was schooled in Quito. His brother Clemente Concha Torres died on June 6, 1882, while fighting the dictatorship of General Ignacio de Veintemilla. Consequently, Luis removed to Panama in support of General Eloy Alfaro. On November 27, he returned to Ecuador with Colonel Jose Martinez, Medardo Alfaro, José Gabriel Moncayo and other liberal revolutionaries, bringing with them about 200 rifles with ammunition bought by Vargas Torres. They landed on the coast of Esmeraldas and organized a small force of volunteers which marched on the city, then guarded by a force of approximately 300 troops of the Veintemilla army. The successful attack came on January 16, 1883, and Alfaro arrived on February 2 and the next day was appointed Supreme Commander of Esmeraldas and Manabi. Within a few days, the Alfaristas were prepared to march on Guayaquil, where Veintemilla had fortified. Vargas Torres commanded one of Alfaro’s two divisions and the subsequent assault on July 9 ended the Veintemillista dictatorship, leading to Vargas Torres' promotion to colonel on August 6.

Vargas Torres served as deputy at the Convention convened by President José Maria Placido Caamano, which met in Quito from 11 October to April 26, 1884. There he vigorously defended his liberal principles but failed to prevail. On September 5 he again embarked for Panama in support of Alfaro where he funded a warship that was placed under the command of Commander Andrés Marín. The revolutionary force was defeated at the naval Battle of Jaramijó (5–6 December) and Vargas Torres took refuge in Lima, Peru, where he published a pamphlet, “La Revolución del 15 de Noviembre de 1884”.

On March 6, 1886, Alfaro also removed to Lima with other liberal leaders to establish a revolutionary base. Vargas Torres organized a new expedition at Paita, on the north coast of Peru, to attack the Caamano government from the south, while Alfaro’s expeditionary force attacked the coast. The revolutionaries entered Catacocha on November 28 where the residents issued a supportive proclamation. After another bloody encounter on December 2, they were prepared to move towards Cuenca. A few days later came the governmental counterattack led by General Antonio Vega Muñoz. After a heroic resistance, and after firing a last round, Vargas Torres leapt over the trenches, machete in hand, followed by his men. Fighting hand to hand, they were overwhelmed by superior numbers and 80 were taken prisoner.

These were court-martialed in Cuenca and the principal leading rebels condemned to death: Colonel Vargas Torres (of Esmeraldas), the lieutenant colonels Filomeno Pesantez (Santa Rosa, El Oro), Pedro Jose Cavero (Loja) and Jacinto Nevarez (Manabi) and master sergeants Manuel M. Piñeiros (Guayaquil) and Rafael Palacios (Esmeraldas). On March 2, 1887, the sentence was upheld by a majority vote of the Council of State. On the eve of his execution Vargas Torres was assisted to escape from prison, but – realizing that he alone would succeed in absconding – returned to face his punishment in support of his less fortunate comrades-in-arms. Early the next morning, dressed smartly in black and with impressively dignified comportment, he refused a blindfold and glared intently at his executioners as they discharged the fatal volley.

== Legacy ==
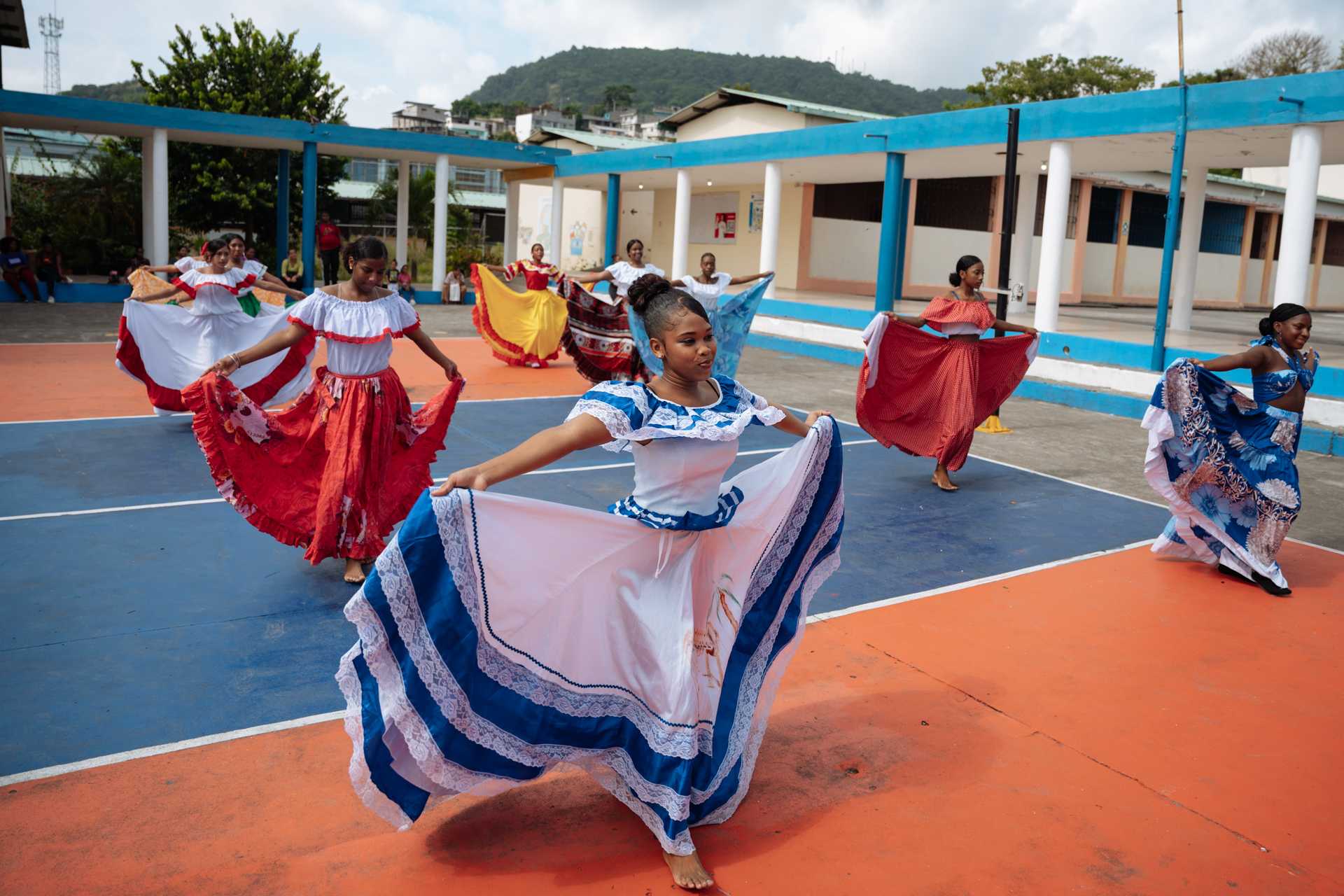
2024 Celebrations at the school named after him in Esmeraldes

- Alfaro’s lifelong struggle to liberalize and modernize Ecuador would ultimately succeed in the Liberal Revolution of 1895.
