= María Gamarra de Hidalgo =

Ecuadorian revolutionary (1846–1916)

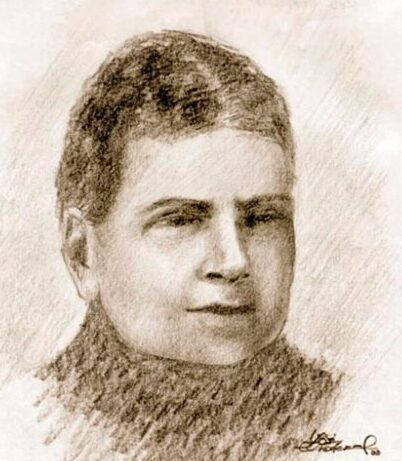
- Born: March 13, 1846
- Died: May 21, 1916 (aged 70)
- Citizenship: Ecuadorian
- Occupation: Liberal Revolutionary
- Movement: Revolución Liberal de Ecuador
- Spouse: Eduardo Hidalgo Arbeláez

María Gamarra de Hidalgo ( April 13, 1846 – May 21, 1916) was an Ecuadorian revolutionary recognized for her defense of social justice and democracy.

== Life and career ==
In 1866, Gamarra married Eduardo Hidalgo Arbeláez, a farm worker. Gamarra spent the majority of her life strengthening the defense of social justice and democracy in her country. She frequently worked with former Ecuadorian President Eloy Alfaro, and participated in his armed struggle for democracy.
