= Nicolás Infante Diaz =

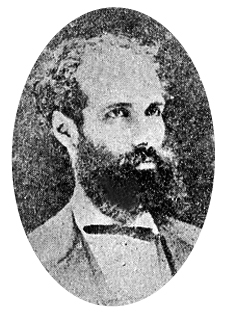
Ecuadorian liberal general Nicolás Infante Diaz.

Nicolás del Carmen Infante Diaz (September 4, 1847, in Palenque – January 1, 1885) was an Ecuadorian liberal and revolutionary.

== Early years ==
His parents were Nicolás Infante Bustamante, Guayaquileño and Doña María de la Trinidad Díaz, Portovejense. He was nine when his mother died. He chose to move to Guayaquil, leaving the agricultural properties. In Guayaquil he received teachings from a Chilean teacher named Chica, who instilled liberal thoughts in him.

== Activities ==
In 1876, Díaz participated in a coup d'état in Guayaquil and was proclaimed "Supreme Chief of the Radical Liberal Party" by General Eloy Alfaro. Since then he participated in numerous revolutions with Mapasingue, Masculillo with an army called : "Hussars of Chapulos."

== Death ==
On January 1, 1885, when Colonel Nicolás Infante Díaz was 38 years old, he was shot by a guard.
