= Jairo Humberto Giraldo =

Colombian convicted serial killer (born 1984)

- Born: Jairo Humberto Giraldo Marín; 1984 (age 41–42); Bogotá, Colombia
- Other name: "The Gay Strangler"
- Conviction: Murder x5
- Penalty: 25 years imprisonment

Details
- Victims: 5
- Span of crimes: April – October 2002
- Country: Ecuador
- State: Pichincha
- Date apprehended: October 25, 2002

Jairo Humberto Giraldo Marín (born 1987), known as The Gay Strangler, is a Colombian serial killer who killed five homosexual men in Quito, Ecuador between April and October 2002. For his crimes, he was sentenced to 25 years imprisonment.

== Early life ==
Giraldo was born in 1984 in Bogotá, Colombia, but was abandoned at an early age by both parents, with his father completely disappearing and his mother moving to Medellín. With nobody to look after him, he took to the streets, where he survived by begging and stealing from passers-by, sometimes using the money to buy drugs. At the age of 8, he was raped by a man in the streets, leaving him traumatized by the event. This, coupled with his unstable social life and financial difficulties, made him plunge into a state of constant depression, with a growing resentment against gay men, whom he blamed for his tragic life.

At the age of 18, while prostituting himself around the streets of Bogotá, Giraldo met 28-year-old Javier Fernando Guanga Villegas, an Ecuadorian transvestite visiting from Guayaquil. The pair became romantically involved, and in February 2002, Guanga took Giraldo with him to Quito, where he was planning to undergo plastic surgery. Not long after their arrival there, a series of murders began to plague the city's gay community.

== Murders ==
Since arriving in the country, Giraldo offered sexual services to gay men in Parque El Ejido, where he agreed to have sex under the sole condition that he was the "man" in the relationship. On April 6, he was hired by a local bank manager, Fidel Assad Buenaño Carriel, and brought to the latter's apartment. There, Buenaño wanted to engage in intercourse with Giraldo, but insisted that he take on the role of the "woman", to which Giraldo vehemently refused. After Buenaño insisted, Giraldo, blinded by sudden rage, proceeded to strangle his client. After realizing that he was dead, Giraldo took all the valuables from his apartment and fled, but soon after, went back to Parque El Ejido.

On April 12, Giraldo was hired by Carlos Abel Ponce Ponce, a Mexican agricultural scientist who was working in Quito. He was taken to his apartment, where, presumably under the same circumstances, he proceeded to strangle Ponce to death. A day later, the same pattern emerged in the killing of Pablo Alejandro Garcés Calero, a well-respected chaplain for the Santa Rita neighborhood. In an effort to forget the murders, Giraldo and Guanga left for Colombia, where they resided for a few months, but returned to Ecuador in September of that year.

By that time, alarms were raised in Quito's gay community about recent killings of homosexual men, which began in January with the death of an older man who was strangled to death in his apartment, naked, with his feet tied to the chair. While there were claims in online forums that some had seen the killer and even knew his identity, nobody contacted the police, fearing it would damage the community's reputation. The killings resumed on September 20, when 26-year-old Carlos Jorge Zavala Barona, a shareholder in an insurance company, was found strangled in his apartment, which had also been robbed.

== Arrest, trial and imprisonment ==
On October 12, Giraldo hooked up with 23-year-old Ernesto Daniel Guzmán Vera, an executive for a textile company, and the two men went to his apartment on González Suárez Avenue. Like the previous victims, Guzmán was strangled and his possessions were about to be looted, but suddenly, a knock on the door was heard. Giraldo hid behind the door, and when the man entered, he grabbed him by the neck, holding up a knife to it and asked him whether he wanted to live. The man, who turned out to be Guzmán's younger brother, David Suárez, replied positively, with Giraldo letting him go unharmed.

After leaving the apartment, Giraldo used Guzmán's stolen cellphone, which allowed investigators to track it down to his partner, arresting Javier Guanga at the Mariscal Sucre International Airport on October 22. When interrogated, Guanga said that his lover, Jairo Giraldo, confessed to him that he killed three men in April at their apartments in the La Libertad Sector. Three days later, Giraldo himself was arrested, still wearing a leather sweater that belonged to his final victim. After searching through his apartment, officers found physical evidence, including perfumes and backpacks, that linked him to the killings. Soon after, the Chief of the Pichincha Judicial Police, Col. Mario Albarracín, announced that the suspect has willingly confessed to five of the recent murders plaguing the city. For his crimes, he was sentenced to 25 years imprisonment, the highest penalty available in the country, and remains in prison to this very day.

During his subsequent interviews with psychologists from the National Police, Giraldo claimed that he had developed strong homophobic sentiments after being raped at a young age, and this, coupled with his horrible experiences and depression, led to him to murder gay men who unconsciously reminded him of that painful memory. According to Francisco Guayasamín, a prominent member of Quito's gay community who had denounced the suspected killer online, Giraldo was a remorseless psychopath who blamed other homosexuals for his woes, and subsequently killed them without a second thought to vent out his frustrations. He also noted that at least five other murders against gays committed in that year had remained unsolved, although he did note that it was unlikely Giraldo to have committed them as he wasn't in Ecuador at the time, instead suggesting the possibility of another killer on the loose. To this day, it remains unclear whether all of the other murders remain unsolved.

== See also ==
- List of serial killers by country
