= Alfaro Civic Center =

Coordinates: 1°03′15″S 80°39′48″W

- Centro Cívico Ciudad Alfaro
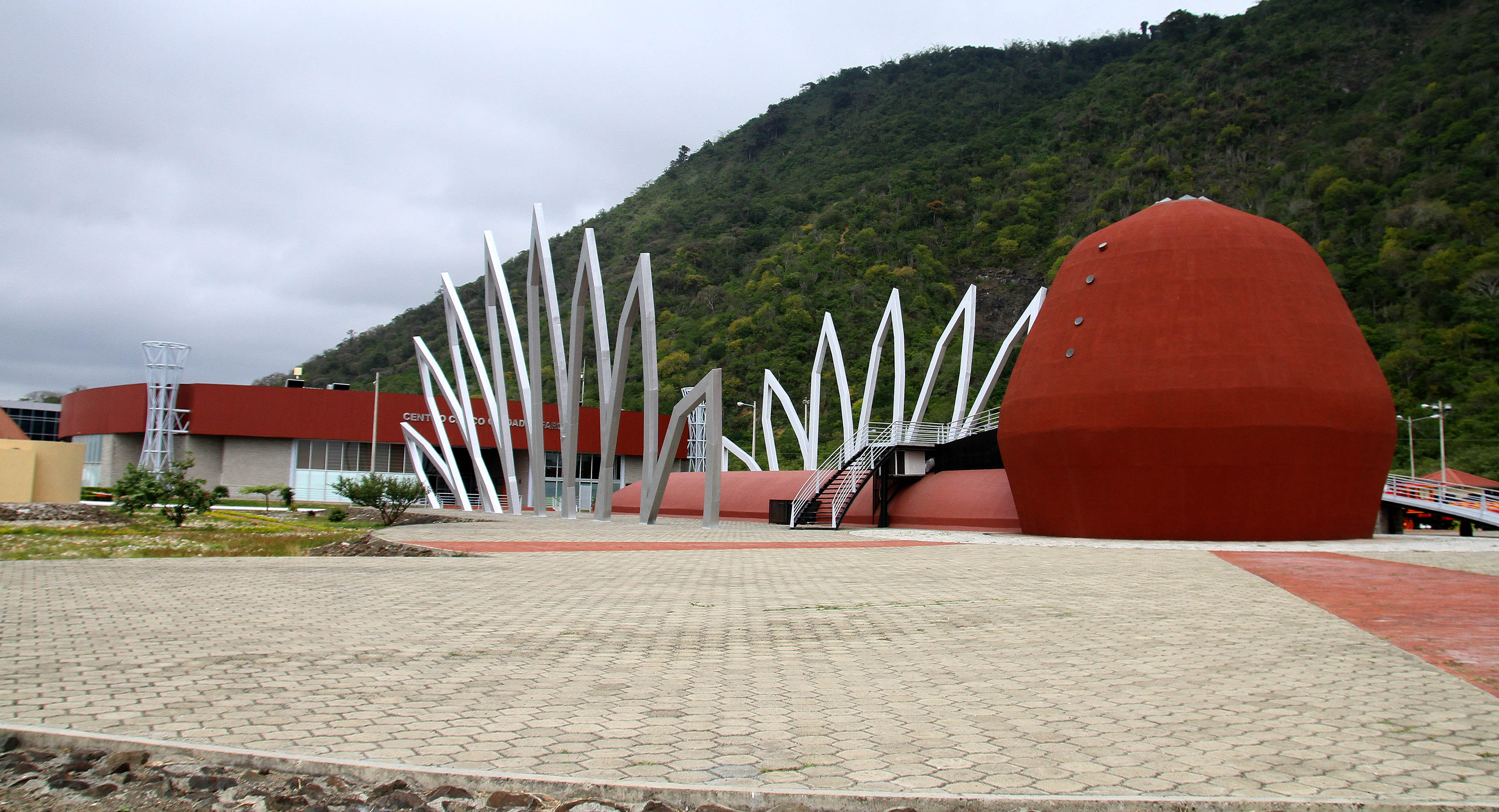

General information
- Type: Civic center and cultural complex
- Location: Montecristi, Manabí Province, Ecuador
- Named for: Eloy Alfaro

Technical details
- Grounds: 5.4 hectacres

The Alfaro Civic Center (Spanish: Centro Cívico Ciudad Alfaro) is located in Montecristi, Manabí Province, Ecuador. It is a space that pays tribute to former Ecuadorian president Eloy Alfaro. Its facilities are situated on the Centinela esplanade, and the Democracy Hall was the seat of the Constituent Assembly held between 2008 and 2009. Since then, the facilities have functioned as a cultural center and museum.

== History ==
The complex occupies an area of 5.4 hectares. Its total construction area covers approximately 8,000 square meters.

Amendments to the Constitution have been made here, as happened in 2015, after the necessary debates for the scheduled constitutional changes.
