= María Elsa Viteri =

Ecuadorian economist and politician (1965–2021)

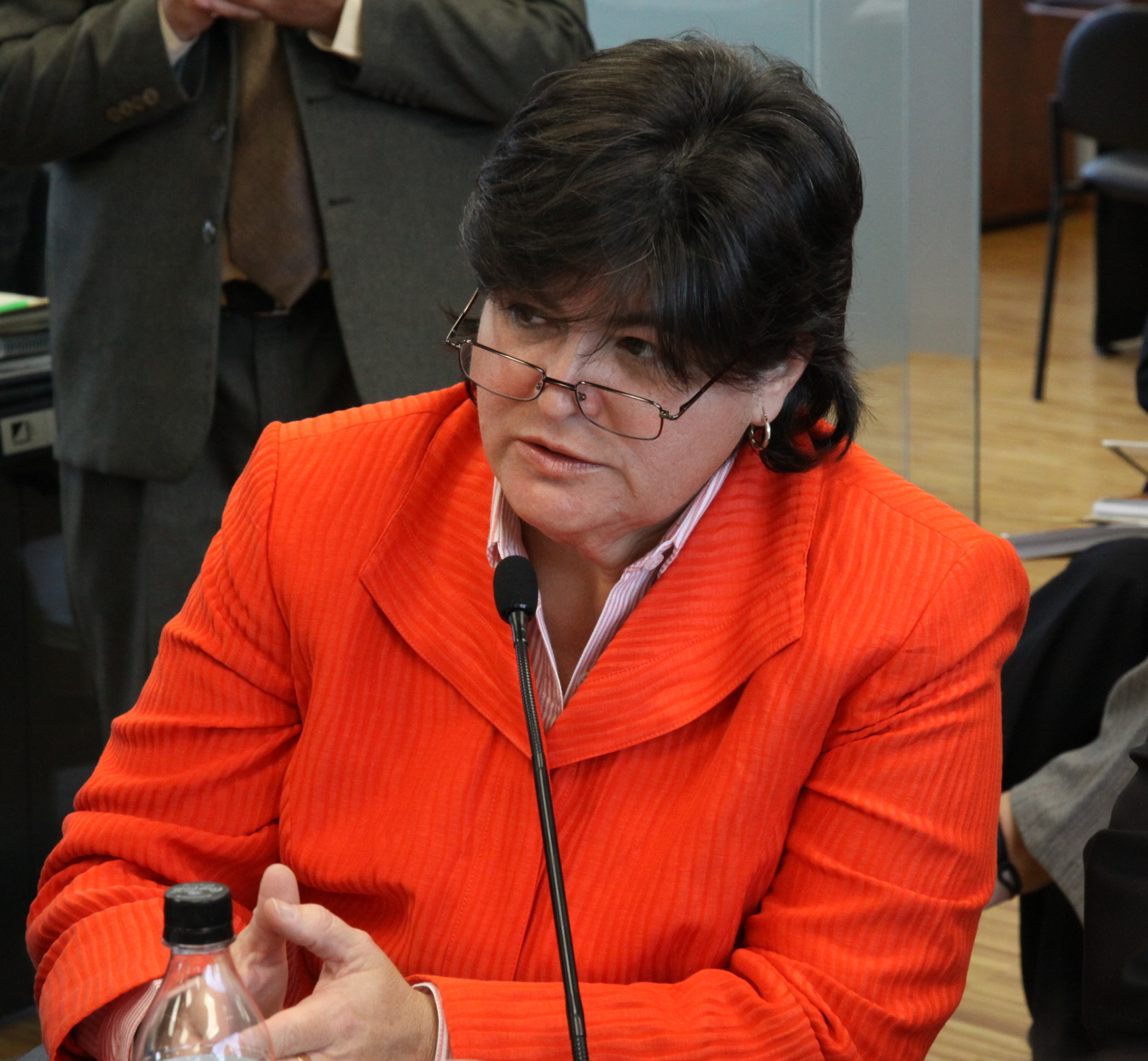
- Viteri in 2010

Minister of Finance
- In office 6 March 2018 – 14 May 2018
- President: Lenín Moreno
- Preceded by: Carlos de la Torre
- Succeeded by: Richard Martínez Alvarado
- In office 16 September 2008 – 21 April 2010
- President: Rafael Correa
- Preceded by: Wilma Salgado
- Succeeded by: Patricio Rivera

Personal details
- Born: 25 February 1965 Guayaquil, Ecuador
- Died: 18 November 2021 (aged 56) Guayaquil, Ecuador

María Elsa Viteri Acaiturri (25 February 1965 – 18 November 2021) was an Ecuadorian economist and politician. She served as Minister of Finance from 2008 to 2010 and again in 2018. Viteri died on 18 November 2021 after a battle with pancreatic cancer.

== Biography ==
María Elsa Viteri was born in Guayaquil on 25 February 1965. She completed her secondary education with a specialization in physics and mathematics at La Asunción School in Guayaquil. She then studied at the Catholic University of Santiago de Guayaquil, graduating in 1989 with a degree in economics and receiving the distinction of top graduate.

From 1989 to 1992, Viteri served as director of the Center for Economic Research at the Catholic University of Santiago de Guayaquil and was also a lecturer at the institution. She later taught at several Ecuadorian universities, including the Catholic University of Santiago de Guayaquil, the University of the Pacific, and the Escuela Superior Politécnica del Litoral (ESPOL).

Viteri also completed a specialization in Economic Sciences and Agricultural Economics at the University of Iowa in the United States.

During her university years, she met future president Rafael Correa. Together they participated in the Alianza Estudiantil (Student Alliance), a political movement founded by Correa. They later worked together at the university's Institute of Economic Research, producing economic research projects and policy papers, where Viteri eventually became director.

In 2000, Viteri moved to Chile to manage her family's business at Clínica Alborada, where she served as general manager until 2007. At the invitation of Finance Minister Fausto Ortiz and President Rafael Correa, she returned to Ecuador and was appointed Minister of Finance in 2008.

Viteri died on 18 November 2021 at the age of 56 from pancreatic cancer.
