= Wilma Salgado =

Ecuadorian politician and economist

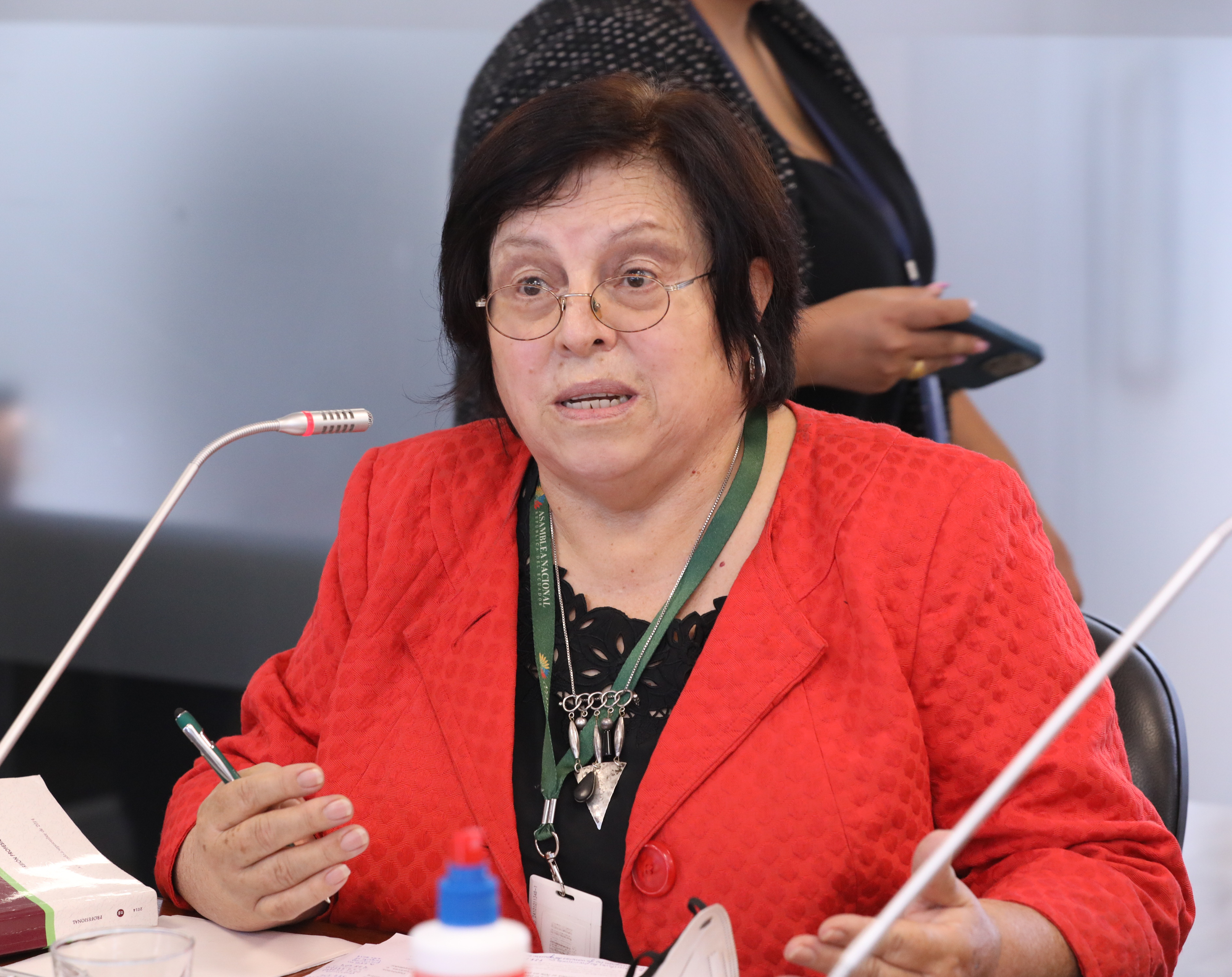
- Ecuador in 2022

Minister of the Interior
- In office 2008–2008
- Preceded by: Fausto Ortiz
- Succeeded by: María Elsa Viteri

Andean Parliament
- In office 2007–2008

Personal details
- Born: Wilma Josefina Salgado Tamayo; 20 October 1952 (age 73) Quito
- Education: Pontificia Universidad Católica del Ecuador
- Occupation: Politician

Wilma Josefina Salgado Tamayo (born 20 October 1952) is an Ecuadorian politician and economist.

== Biography ==
Wilma Salgado was born on 20 October 1952 in Quito, capital of Ecuador. She acquired her bachelor's degree at the Pontificia Universidad Católica del Ecuador, master's degree from the Pantheon-Sorbonne University in Paris, and finally her PhD from the National Autonomous University of Mexico. On returning to Ecuador, Salgado was hired to work in the Central Bank of Ecuador as a director of economic forecasts, and would in 1991 serve as an economic adviser to the president of the Ecuadorian National Congress. She would also work as a professor of economics at the Andina Simón Bolívar University and as an adviser to the Minister of Finance.

In March 2003, Salgado was appointed by President Lucio Gutiérrez as manager of the Deposit Guarantee Agency (AGD). As the manager of AGD, she ordered the seizure of goods from dozens of companies and individuals that owed money to the banks themselves bankrupted during the financial crisis of 1999, one of whom was former President of the National Congress Juan José Pons, who had a house seized. Pons filed a lawsuit against Salgado, accusing her of perverting the course of justice, but Salgado was acquitted of the charges.

She was Minister of Finance in 2008.
