= Montecristi, Ecuador =

Montecristi
- Town
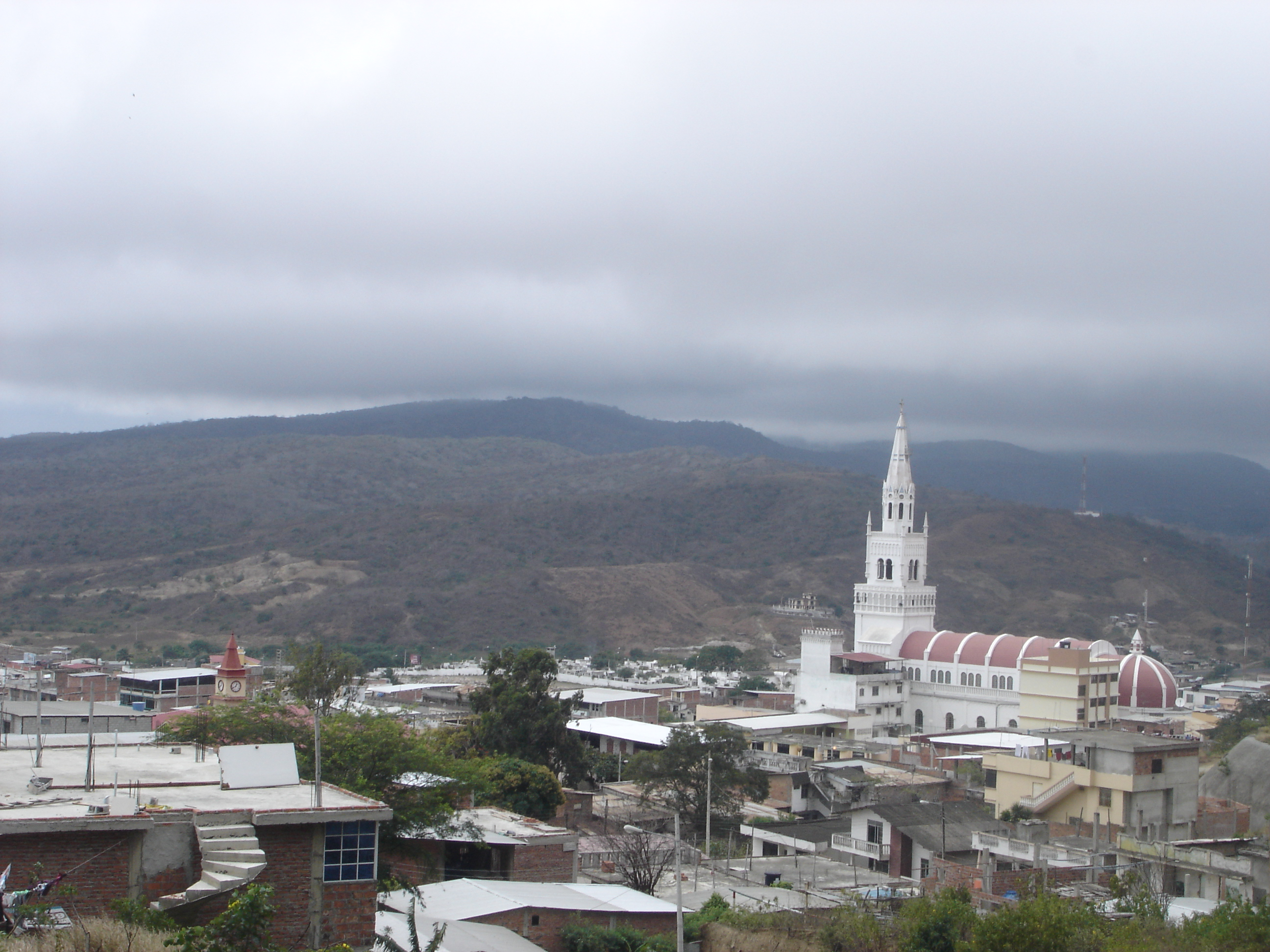

- Location within Ecuador
- Coordinates: 1°03′S 80°40′W
- Country: Ecuador
- Province: Manabí
- Canton: Montecristi

Area
  - Town: 32.72 km^{2} (12.63 sq mi)

Population (2022 census)
  - Town: 71,066
  - Density: 2,172/km^{2} (5,625/sq mi)
- Time zone: UTC-5 (ECT)

Montecristi is a town in the Manabí province of Ecuador and the capital of Montecristi Canton.

Montecristi was formed during the first years of the Spanish conquest, possibly between 1536 and 1537, with settlers from Manta who left their village fleeing pirate attacks. Among the first settlers appears a man named "Criste", who would have built his house on top of the mountain, so it is believed that the place acquired the name of Montecriste, which later, for idiomatic ease, ended up being called Montecristi.

As of the 2022 census Montecristi had a population of 71,066.

The town is renowned for the production of Panama hats, the best quality of which is named montecristi superfino after it.

Montecristi is the birthplace of Eloy Alfaro Delgado (25 June 1842 – 28 January 1912), president of Ecuador from 1895 to 1901 and from 1906 to 1911 and the leader of the Ecuadorian Liberal Revolution. Because of this, Montecristi was selected by the Ecuadorian Constituent Assembly in 2007 as the seat of covenants for the 2008 Constitution of Ecuador.

The town is also home to the Alfaro Civic Center, which is used for local government activities and additional Amendments to the Constitution, such as in 2015 after the necessary debates for the scheduled constitutional changes.

== Climate ==
Montecristi has an arid desert climate (Köppen: BWh).

Climate data for Montecristi
Month	Jan	Feb	Mar	Apr	May	Jun	Jul	Aug	Sep	Oct	Nov	Dec	Year
Mean daily maximum °C (°F)	28.7 (83.7)	28.7 (83.7)	29.1 (84.4)	29.1 (84.4)	28.5 (83.3)	27.5 (81.5)	27.1 (80.8)	26.9 (80.4)	26.9 (80.4)	27.0 (80.6)	27.3 (81.1)	28.1 (82.6)	27.9 (82.2)
Daily mean °C (°F)	25.8 (78.4)	26.2 (79.2)	26.4 (79.5)	26.2 (79.2)	25.5 (77.9)	24.5 (76.1)	23.9 (75.0)	23.5 (74.3)	23.4 (74.1)	23.6 (74.5)	23.8 (74.8)	24.8 (76.6)	24.8 (76.6)
Mean daily minimum °C (°F)	23.9 (75.0)	24.4 (75.9)	24.5 (76.1)	24.2 (75.6)	23.6 (74.5)	22.7 (72.9)	22.0 (71.6)	21.5 (70.7)	21.4 (70.5)	21.7 (71.1)	21.9 (71.4)	22.8 (73.0)	22.9 (73.2)
Average precipitation mm (inches)	61.1 (2.41)	112.6 (4.43)	101.2 (3.98)	57.5 (2.26)	23.5 (0.93)	13.2 (0.52)	7.2 (0.28)	5.1 (0.20)	8.0 (0.31)	8.0 (0.31)	9.2 (0.36)	23.4 (0.92)	430 (16.91)
Source: Weather.Directory

== Sources ==
- Manabi.gob.ec: Montecristi (canton and city)
- Montecristi.gob.ec: Historia
- Montecuadorhats.com: Montecristi
- Enciclopedia del Ecuador: Montecristi
- AME.gob.ec (Associación de Municipalides Ecuadorianas): Montecristi, Cuna de Alfaro
- Gobierno de México: Secretaría de Cultura: Prensa - Montecristi: un sombrero con denominación de origen
- Ayuntamiento Montecristi: Historia
