= Fernando Aspiazu =

Ecuadorian businessman (1935–2024)

Minister of Economy and Finance
- In office 10 August 1979 – 21 March 1980
- President: Jaime Roldós Aguilera
- Preceded by: Juan Reyna Santacruz
- Succeeded by: Rodrigo Paz

Personal details
- Born: 10 January 1935; Quito, Ecuador
- Died: 30 November 2024 (aged 89)
- Political party: Independent
- Occupation: Banker, businessman

Fernando Aspiazu (10 January 1935 – 30 November 2024) was an Ecuadorian businessman. An independent, he served as minister of economy and finance of Ecuador from 1979 to 1980.

Aspiazu died on 30 November 2024, at the age of 89.
