= Montecristi Canton =

Coordinates: 1.03333°S 80.65°W

- Canton
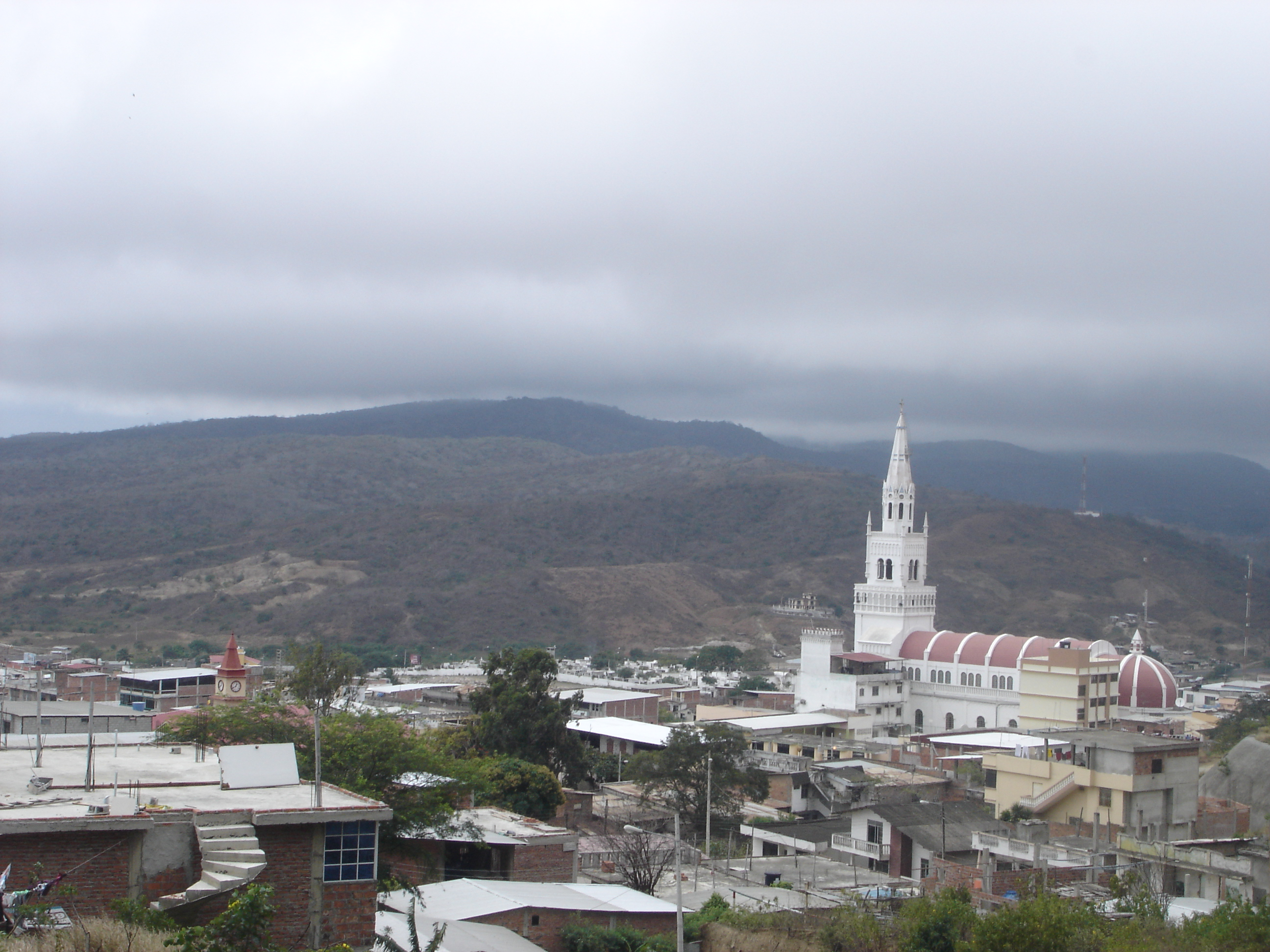

- Location of Manabí Province in Ecuador.

- Montecristi Canton in Manabí Province
- Country: Ecuador
- Province: Manabí Province

Area
  - Total: 705.6 km^{2} (272.4 sq mi)

Population (2022 census)
  - Total: 99,937
  - Density: 141.6/km^{2} (366.8/sq mi)
- Time zone: UTC-5 (ECT)

Montecristi Canton is a canton of Ecuador, located in the Manabí Province. Its capital is the town of Montecristi. Its population at the 2001 census was 43,400.

== Demographics ==
Ethnic groups as of the Ecuadorian census of 2010:

- Mestizo 75.6%
- Montubio 9.6%
- Afro-Ecuadorian 9.5%
- White 5.0%
- Indigenous 0.1%
- Other 0.3%
