= Betancourt Doctrine =

Foreign policy of Venezuela

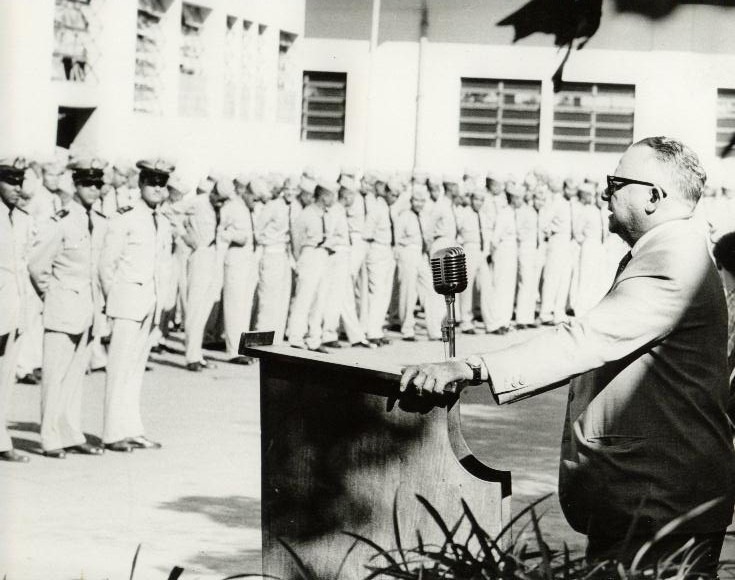
Rómulo Betancourt during a speech to a group of officers.

Betancourt Doctrine (Spanish: Doctrina Betancourt) was a foreign policy of Venezuela promoted by the President Rómulo Betancourt that requires the termination of diplomatic relations with governments without democratic legitimacy. It effectively called for the withdrawal of bilateral relations between Venezuela and countries with dictatorships and governments that came to power by coup d'état or electoral fraud.

== History ==
In 1907, Carlos R. Tobar, Foreign Minister of Ecuador, advanced what would be known as the Tobar Doctrine, holding that states should not give diplomatic recognition to governments that came to power through revolution or coups.

Rómulo Betancourt was sworn in as President of Venezuela in February 1959 before the Congress of the Republic in the Federal Legislative Palace for his second presidency. Betancourt's inaugural address made clear his political perspective, proclaimed what is now known as the Betancourt Doctrine, and made his pronouncement about the new police doctrine for the country:

We will request cooperation from other democratic governments of America to ask, united, that the Organization of American States exclude dictatorial governments from their bosom because they not only affront the dignity of America, but also because Article 1 of the Charter of Bogotá, constituent act of the OAS, establishes that only governments of respectable origin born of popular expression can be part of this organism, through the only legitimate source of power that are the freely chosen elections. Regimes that do not respect human rights, that violate the liberties of their citizens and tyranny with the support of totalitarian policies, must be subjected to a rigorous sanitary cord and eradicated through the collective peaceful action of the international legal community.

— Rómulo Betancourt

This proclamation is understood as an instrument of protection for democratic regimes, the result of the free election of the people. It rejects the recognition of non-democratic or illegitimate governments.

Under the Betancourt Doctrine, Venezuela maintained good relations with the democratic governments, especially with the government of John F. Kennedy in United States, Luis Muñoz Marín in Puerto Rico, Manuel Ávila Camacho and Adolfo López Mateos in Mexico, and Alberto Lleras Camargo in Colombia. In turn, it cut diplomatic relations with the non-democratic governments of Spain, the Soviet Union and Eastern Bloc states, Cuba, the Dominican Republic, Argentina, Peru, Ecuador, Guatemala, Honduras and Haiti. This was maintained by Betancourt during his presidency from 1959 to 1964 and by his successor Raúl Leoni from 1964 to 1969.

Betancourt Doctrine was discontinued in Venezuela by President Rafael Caldera in 1969, adopting a foreign policy known as "pluralistic solidarity" which saw the restoration of bilateral relations between Venezuela and non-democratic governments.

In 1990, President Guillermo Endara of Panama and his Foreign Affairs Minister Julio Linares issued Decree Number 364 which adopted a foreign policy based on Betancourt Doctrine. The decree established "clear rules for not recognizing governments that arise from coups d'état or electoral fraud." In 2024, President José Raúl Mulino announced that Panama would suspend diplomatic relations with Venezuela due to alleged discrepancies in the 2024 Venezuelan presidential election. Mulino said this would continue until a full review of the vote count was completed, citing Endara's Betancourt Doctrine as the reason.

== See also ==
- Estrada Doctrine
- Tobar Doctrine
