= Vicente Lucio Salazar =

Acting president of Ecuador (1895)

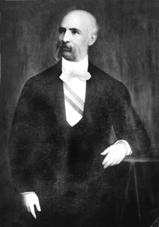

Acting President of Ecuador
- In office 16 April 1895 – 4 September 1895
- Preceded by: Luis Cordero Crespo
- Succeeded by: Eloy Alfaro

Vice President of Ecuador
- In office 27 January 1894 – 5 June 1895
- Preceded by: Pablo Herrera
- Succeeded by: Position vacant

Personal details
- Born: Vicente Lucio Salazar y Cabal; 20 December 1832 Quito, Ecuador
- Died: 14 February 1896 (aged 63) Quito, Ecuador
- Party: Conservative Party

Vicente Lucio Salazar y Cabal (20 December 1832 – 14 February 1896) was Acting President of Ecuador between 16 April 1895 and 1 September 1895. Salazar was Presidents of the Chamber of Deputies in 1873, and President of the Senate in 1892. He became Vice President in 1894, becoming president when Luis Cordero left office. He was also Minister of Finance on numerous occasions.

== Biography ==
Vicente Lucio Salazar was born to Manuel María Salazar y Lozano and Carolina Cabal y Salazar on 20 December 1832 in Quito. He became a Juris Doctor and worked as an economist for thirty years, serving variously as the Minister of Finance in 1873, 1883, 1884-1887, 1888, and 1893. He later served in the National Congress as a Deputy. In 1892 he was elected as the President of the Senate, and in 1893 was delegated by Luis Cordero to be the Minister of the Interior and Foreign Relations, but he was shortly thereafter elected as the Vice President. His president, though, was caught up in a controversy regarding the First Sino-Japanese War, called the Venta De La Bandera. Cordero resigned, leading to Lucio's presidency, which began on 16 April 1895. His presidency saw the beginning of the Liberal Revolution of Ecuador. Meanwhile, he could not fulfill government obligations because of paralysis. This led to a resignation filed on 28 June 1895 (where he was succeeded by Eloy Alfaro) and later death on14 February 1896 in Quito.

In his time as a finance minister, he went to Washington, D.C., on occasions to ask for loans from the United States.

Political offices
Preceded by Pablo Herrera	Vice President of Ecuador; 1894–1895	Succeeded by Vacant
Preceded by Luis Cordero	Acting President of Ecuador; 1895	Succeeded by Eloy Alfaro
