= Ministry of Economy and Finance (Ecuador) =

Cabinet of the government of Ecuador

Ministry of Economy and Finance of Ecuador
- Ministerio de Economía y Finanzas

Agency overview
- Formed: 1830
- Jurisdiction: Government of Ecuador
- Headquarters: Av. Amazonas entre Pereira y Unión Nacional de Periodistas, Quito
- Agency executive: Sariha Moya, Minister
- Website: Official website

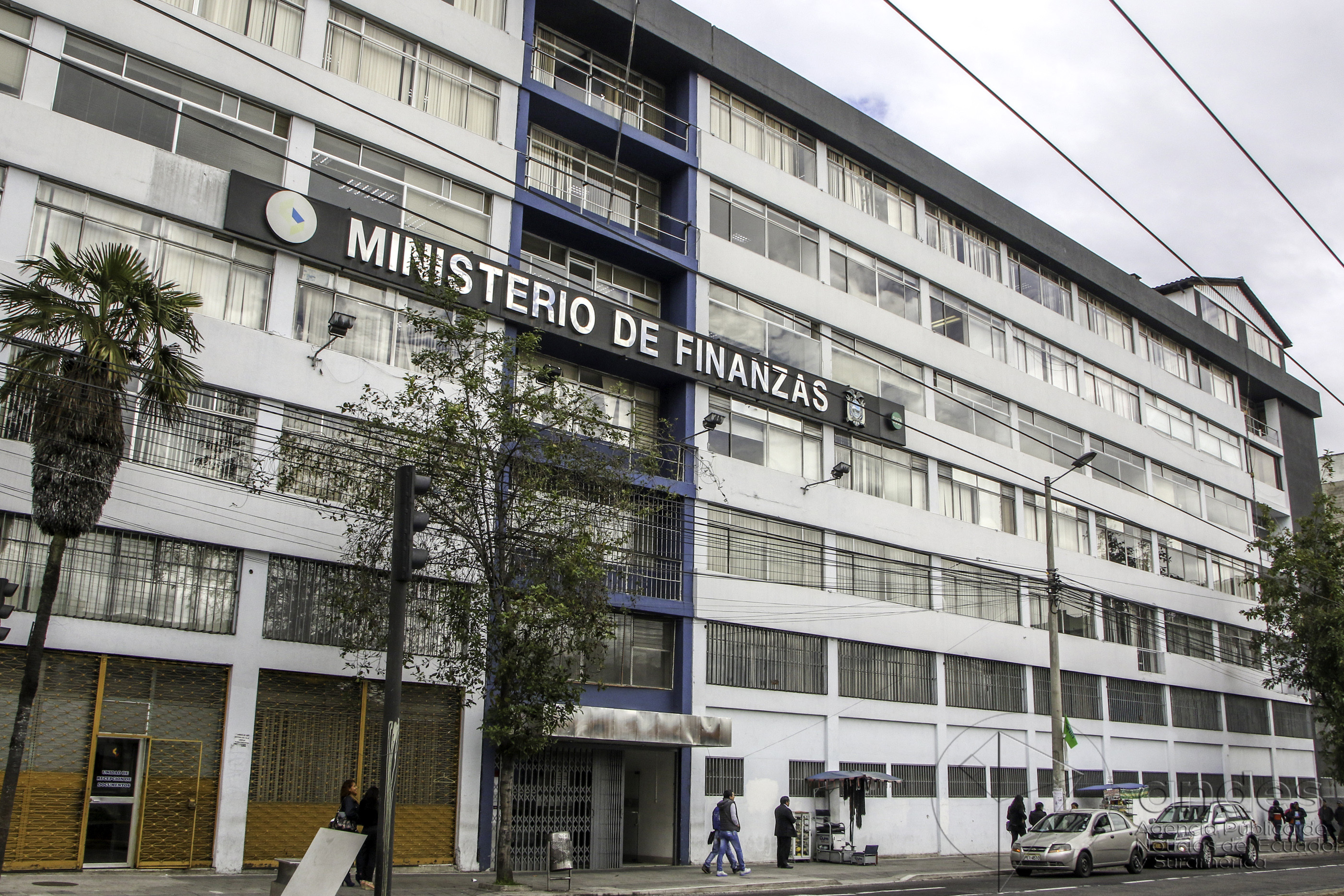
The headquarters of the ministry

The Ministry of Economy and Finance is a cabinet ministry of the government of Ecuador responsible for overseeing the nation's public finances. The current minister is Sariha Moya since 2025.

== Ministers of Finance ==
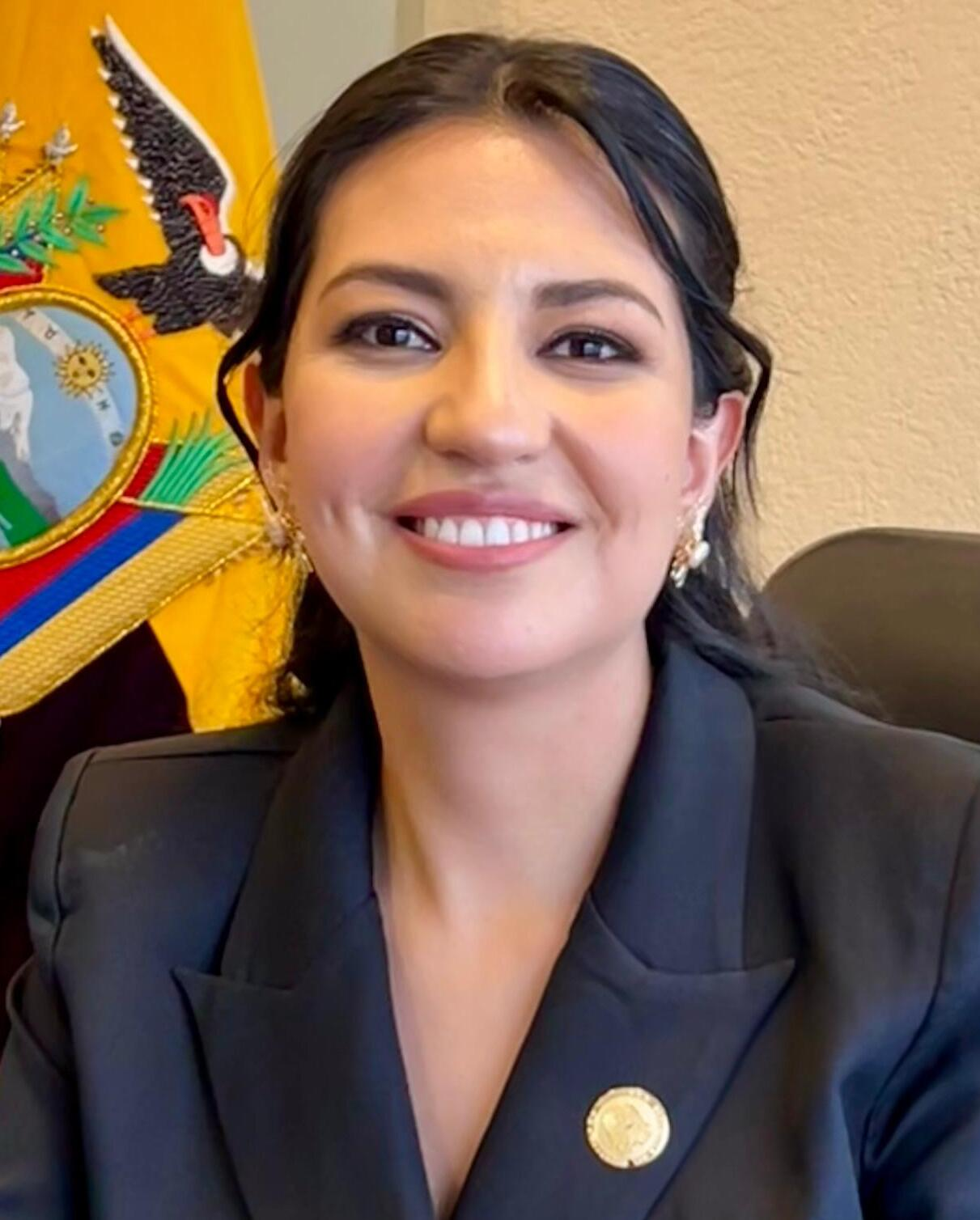
Sariha Moya, the current minister

- Antonio Fernández Salvador, 1830-1831
- José Félix Valdivieso, 1831
- Juan García del Río, 1832-1834
- Francisco Eugenio Tamariz, 1835-1836
- Manuel López Escobar, 1836-1837
- Antonio Fernández Salvador, 1838
- Manuel López Escobar, 1839
- Luis de Saa, 1839-1842
- Juan Hipólito Soulin, 1842
- Francisco de Aguirre, 1843-1845
- Roberto Ascázubi, 1846
- Manuel Bustamante, 1846-1847
- José Javier Valdivieso, 1848-1849
- Manuel Bustamante, 1849
- Luis de Saa, 1849
- Manuel López Escobar, 1849
- Carlos Chiriboga, 1850-1851
- José María Caamaño, 1852
- Francisco Marcos, 1852
- Marcos Espinel, 1853-1854
- Teodoro Gómez de la Torre, 1855
- Francisco Pablo Icaza, 1855-1857
- Antonio Yerovi, 1858-1859
- José Sánchez Brun, 1860
- Carlos Aguirre, 1861
- Rafael Carvajal, 1862
- Camilo Ponce Ortiz, 1863
- Víctor Laso, 1863
- Pablo Bustamante Iturralde, 1864-1865
- Francisco E. Tamariz, 1865
- Antonio Flores Jijón, 1865
- Manuel Bustamante, 1866
- Bernardo Dávalos, 1867
- Manuel Bustamante, 1867
- Camilo Ponce Ortiz, 1867
- Manuel de Ascásubi, 1868
- Julio Castro Bastus, 1868
- Manuel de Ascásubi, 1868
- Gabriel García Moreno, 1868
- Rafael Carvajal, 1869
- José María Baquerizo, 1869-1870
- Roberto de Ascázubi, 1870
- José Javier Eguiguren, 1870-1871
- Vicente Lucio Salazar, 1873
- José Javier Eguiguren, 1874-1875
- Rafael Pólit, 1875
- Manuel Gómez de la Torre, 1876
- José Rafael Arízaga, 1876
- José Vélez, 1876-1878
- Julio Castro Bastus, 1878
- Martín Icaza, 1878-1880
- José Vélez, 1880
- Martín Icaza, 1881-1882
- José Álvarez, 1883
- Manuel Noboa, 1883
- Vicente Lucio Salazar, 1883
- Camilo Andrade, 1883
- Federico Galdos, 1883
- Vicente Lucio Salazar, 1884-1887
- Gabriel Jesús Núñez, 1888
- Vicente Lucio Salazar, 1888
- José Toribio Noboa, 1888-1889
- Francisco Campos, 1889-1890
- Gabriel Jesús Núñez, 1890-1893
- Vicente Lucio Salazar, 1893
- Francisco Andrade Marín, 1894
- Alejandro Cárdenas, 1894-1895
- Lizardo García, 1895
- Gabriel Jesús Núñez, 1895
- Francisco de Roca, 1895
- Pedro Lizarzaburu, 1895
- Carlos Pérez Quiñónez, 1895
- Gabriel de Jesús Núñez Terán, 1895
- F. P. Roca, 1895-1896
- Serafín S. Wíther Navarro, 1896-1897
- Ricardo Valdivieso Palacio, 1897-1900
- Tomás Gagliardo Aubert, 1900-1901
- Vidal Enríquez Ante, 1901
- Juan F. Game Balarezo, 1901-1905
- Camilo Echanique de la Serna, 1906
- Amalio Puga Salazar, 1906-1907
- Alejandro Reyes V., 1907
- Jorge Marcos Aguirre, 1907-1908
- Belisario Torres Otoya, 1908
- Tomás Gagliardo Aubert, 1908-1909
- César Borja Lavayen, 1909-1910
- Luis Adriano Dillon Reina, 1910-1911
- Manuel E. Escudero, 1911
- Leónidas Plaza Gutiérrez, 1911
- J. Federico Intriago Navas, 1911-1912
- Juan F. Game Balarezo, 1912-1914
- Agustín Cabezas G., 1914-1916
- Carlos A. Borja Lavayen, 1916-1917
- Miguel G. Hurtado, 1917-1920
- Gustavo Aguirre O., 1920-1921
- Emilio Cucalón Pareja, 1921-1922
- Alfonso B. Larrea A., 1922-1924
- Alberto Gómez Jaramillo, 1924
- Miguel Ángel Albornoz Tabares, 1924-1925
- Luis Napoleón Dillon Cabezas, 1925-1926
- Humberto Albornoz, 1926
- Pedro Leopoldo Núñez Terán, 1926-1927
- Alberto Gómez Jaramillo, 1927-1928
- Luis A. Carbo Noboa, 1928
- Secundino Sáenz de Tejada, 1928-1929
- Juan de Dios Martínez Mera, 1929-1930
- Sixto Durán-Ballén Romero, 1930-1931
- Pedro Leopoldo Nuñez Terán, 1931
- Juan de Dios Martínez Mera, 1931-1932
- Federico Cornejo Campuzano, 1932-1933
- Augusto Alvarado Olea, 1933
- Jaime Puig Arosemena, 1933
- Manuel Stacey Cabeza de Vaca, 1933
- Alfredo Espinosa Palacios, 1933
- Cayetano Uribe Quiñonez, 1933-1934
- Victor Emilio Estrada Sciacaluga, 1934
- Carlos Arízaga Toral, 1934-1935
- Luis A. Carbo Noboa, 1935
- Enrique Arrate Crosby, 1935
- Gerónimo Avilés Aguirre, 1935-1936
- Alberto Wither Navarro, 1936-1937
- Heleodoro Sáenz R., 1937-1938
- Gabriel Martínez Intriago, 1938
- José Carbo Puig, 1938
- Carlos de Icaza Sániter, 1938
- César A. Durango Montenegro, 1938-1939
- César D. Andrade López, 1939
- Carlos Freile Larrea, 1939-1940
- Luis Cordovés Borja, 1940-1941
- Vicente Illingworth Icaza, 1941-1944
- Alberto Wright Vallarino, 1944
- Luis Eduardo Lasso González, 1944
- Mariano Suárez Veintimilla, 1944-1945
- Enrique Arízaga Toral, 1945-1947
- Jerónimo Avilés Alfaro, 1947
- Luis Fernando Ruiz Lecaros, 1947
- Ruperto Alarcón Falconí, 1947
- Raúl Clemente Huerta Rendón, 1947-1948
- Carlos Martínez Quirola, 1948-1950
- José Araujo Luna, 1950-1951
- Alfredo Peña Herrera, 1951-1952
- José Araujo Luna, 1952
- Nicolás Augusto Maldonado, 1952-1953
- Wilson Vera Herbas, 1953-1954
- Jaime Acosta Velasco, 1954-1955
- José Gabriel Terán Varea, 1955-1956
- Fausto Cordovez Chiriboga, 1956-1958
- Isidro de Icaza Plaza, 1958
- Luis Gómez Izquierdo, 1958-1959
- José A. Ballén de la Calle, 1959-1960
- José Garcés Alzamora, 1960-1961
- Bolívar Lasso Carrión, 1961
- Jorge Acosta Velasco, 1961
- Manuel Naranjo Toro, 1961-1962
- Juan Sevilla Delgado, 1962-1963
- Jack Bermeo Cevallos, 1963-1964
- Alberto Quevedo Toro, 1964-1965
- Jaime Salvador Campuzano, 1965-1966
- Guillermo Borja Enríquez, 1966
- Renato Ruiz Drouet, 1966
- Federico Intriago Arrata, 1966-1967
- Manuel Correa Arroyo, 1967-1968
- Luis Guzmán Vanegas, 1968-1969
- Leonidas Avilés Robinson, 1969
- Benito Ottati Moreira, 1969
- Luis Gómez Izquierdo, 1969-1970
- Jaime Aspiazu Seminario, 1970
- Alonso Salgado Gueva, 1970-1971
- Nestor Vega Moreno, 1972-1973
- Enrique Salas Castillo, 1973-1974
- Jaime Moncayo García, 1974-1975
- Jaime Morillo Battle, 1975-1976
- César Robalino Gonzaga, 1976
- Santiago Sevilla Larrea, 1976-1978
- Juan Reyna Santacruz, 1978-1979
- Fernando Aspiazu, 1979-1980
- Rodrigo Paz, 1980-1981
- César Robalino Gonzaga, 1981-1982
- Jaime Morillo Battle, 1982
- Pedro Pinto Rubianes, 1982-1984
- Francisco Swett Morales, 1984-1986
- Alberto Dahik, 1986-1987
- Rodrigo Espinosa Bermeo, 1987-1988
- Eduardo Cabezas Molina, 1988
- Jorge Gallardo Zavala, 1988-1991
- Pablo Better Grunbaum, 1991-1992
- Mario Ribadeneira Traversari, 1992-1993
- César Robalino Gonzaga, 1993-1994
- Modesto Correa San Andrés, 1994-1995
- Mauricio Pinto Mancheno, 1995
- Iván Andrade Apunte, 1995-1996
- Pablo Concha Ledergerber, 1996-1997
- Carlos Dávalos Rodas, 1997
- Marco Flores Troncoso, 1997-1998
- Fidel Jaramillo Buendía, 1998-1999
- Ana Lucía Armijos, 1999
  - Guillermo Lasso, 1999 (as Superminister)
- Alfredo Arizaga González, 1999-2000
- Jorge Guzmán Ortega, 2000
- Luis Yturralde Mancero, 2000
- Jorge Gallardo Zavala, 2001
- Carlos Julio Emanuel, 2001-2002
- Francisco Arosemena Robles, 2002-2003
- Mauricio Pozo Crespo, 2003-2004
- Mauricio Yépez, 2004-2005
- Rafael Correa, 2005
- Magdalena Barreiro, 2005
- Diego Borja Cornejo, 2005-2006
- Armando Rodas Espinel, 2006
- José Jouvín Vernaza, 2006
- Ricardo Patiño, 2007
- Fausto Ortiz de la Cadena, 2007-2008
- Wilma Salgado, 2008
- María Elsa Viteri, 2008-2010
- Patricio Rivera Yánez, 2010-2013
- Fausto Herrera Nicolaide, 2013-2016
- Patricio Rivera Yánez, 2016-2017
- Carlos de la Torre Muñoz, 2017-2018
- María Elsa Viteri, 2018
- Richard Martínez Alvarado, 2018-2020
- Mauricio Pozo Crespo, 2020-2021
- Simón Cueva, 2021-2022
- Pablo Arosemena Marriott, 2022-2023
- Juan Carlos Vega, 2023-2025
- Luis Alberto Jaramillo, 2025
- Sariha Moya, 2025–present

== See also ==
- Central Bank of Ecuador
- Finance ministry
- Economy of Ecuador
- Government of Ecuador
