= Federico González Suárez =

Ecuadorian priest

- Archbishop of Quito
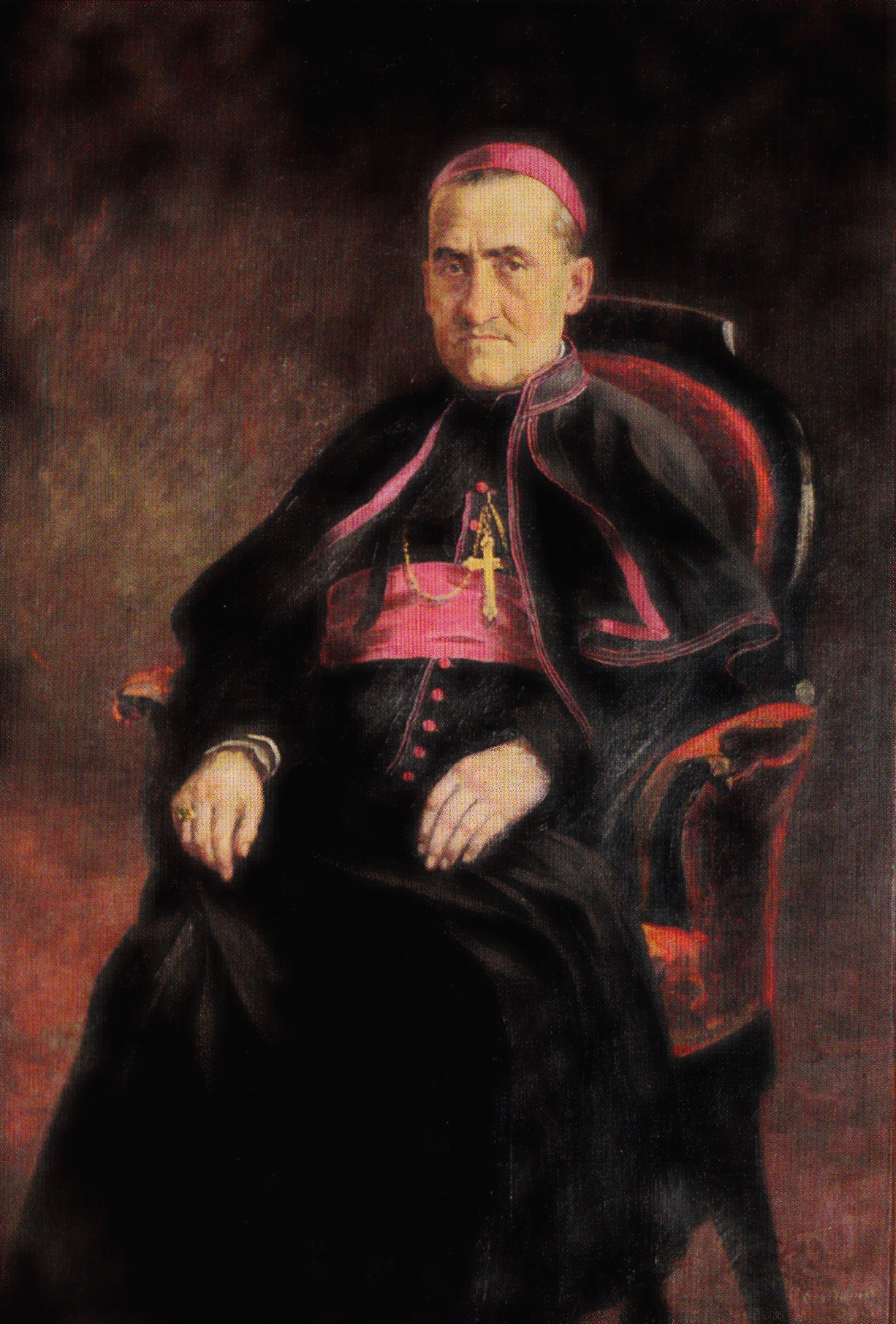
- Diocese: Archdiocese of Quito
- See: Cathedral of Quito
- Installed: December 14, 1905
- Term ended: December 5, 1917
- Predecessor: Pedro Rafael González Calisto
- Successor: Manuel Maria Polit

Orders
- Ordination: July 30, 1895

Personal details
- Born: April 12, 1844 Quito, Ecuador
- Died: December 1, 1917 (aged 72) Quito, Ecuador
- Buried: Cathedral of Quito
- Denomination: Roman Catholic
- Parents: Manuel María González and María Mercedes Suárez

Federico González Suárez (1844–1917) was an Ecuadorian priest, historian and politician who served as the Archbishop of Quito for twelve years. Prior to becoming the Archbishop of Quito, he served as a senator in the Ecuadorian government in 1894 and then as the Bishop of Ibarra from 1895 to 1905.

== Overview ==
He was noted for his opposition to the attempts by the anticlerical caudillo Eloy Alfaro to secularize Ecuadorian society.

Despite his opposition to the anticlericals, he could be conciliatory and was known as a peacemaker during the country's volatile times, helping to maintain continuity in the nation. Of particular note was his public denunciation of a Conservative force massing in Colombia in 1900, a declaration that effectively ended five years of Civil War and ascribed a measure of legitimacy to Alfaro's Liberal government.

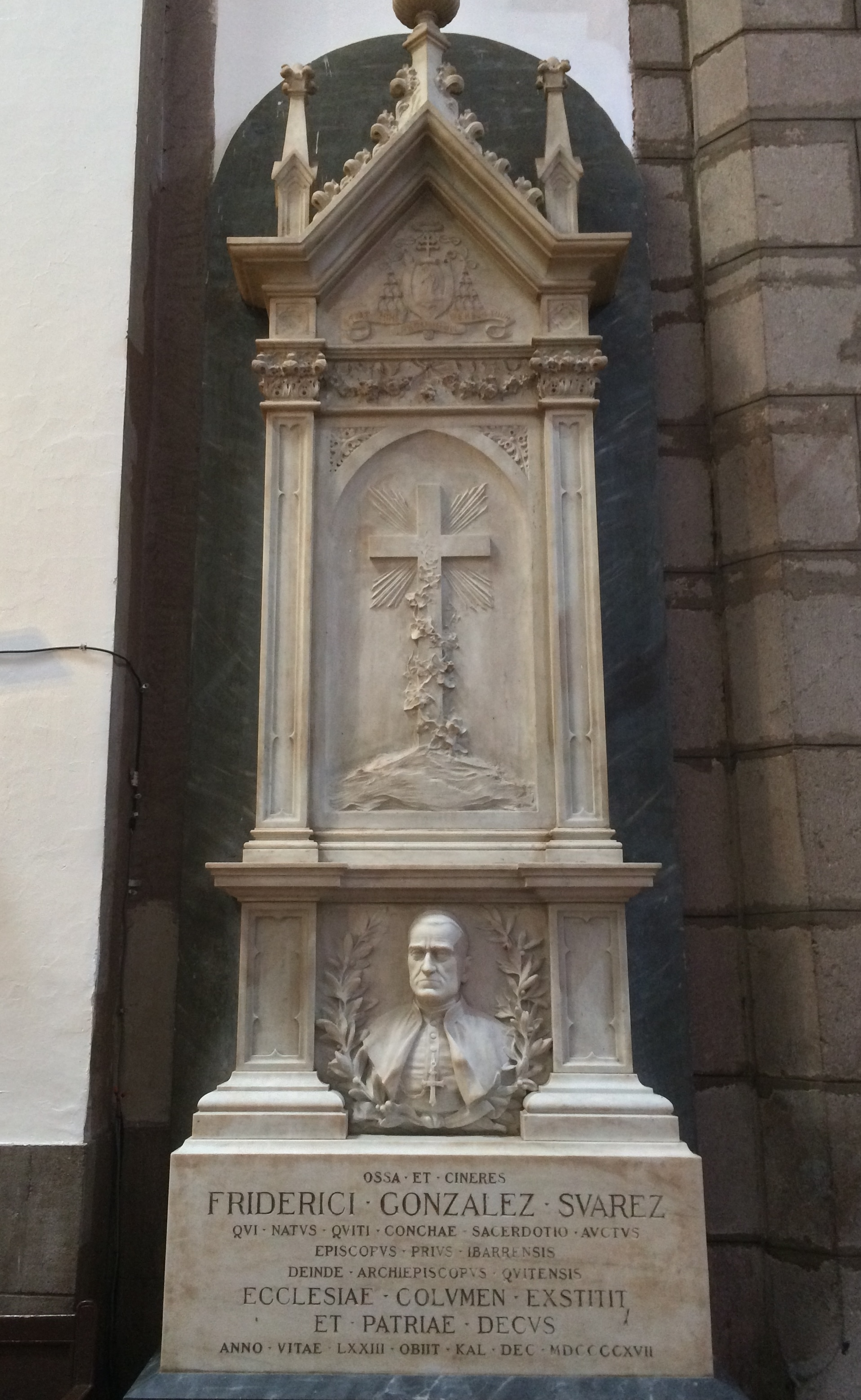
Cenotaph dedicated to Federico González Suárez, Quito Metropolitan Cathedral.

He wrote several books about the history of Ecuador, among them the book Historia General de la República del Ecuador, which is considered a masterpiece for its objectivity, painstaking research and erudition. He was not shy about criticizing the Church in Ecuador for abuses during the colonial period. The publication of the fourth volume of his history in 1894 was particularly scandalous since it uncovered the sexual liaisons of seventeenth-century Dominican friars in Quito. Although this work drew criticism from his superiors, he was ultimately vindicated, with the Vatican acknowledging the veracity of his analysis.

His work in scholarship, political knowledge and commitment to the faith cause him to be remembered as one of the most notable figures of Ecuadorian scholarship, politics and Church leadership.

The González Suárez neighborhood of the city of Quito is named after him.
