= Gillette Historic District =

Historic district in Oklahoma, United States

- U.S. National Register of Historic Places
- U.S. Historic district
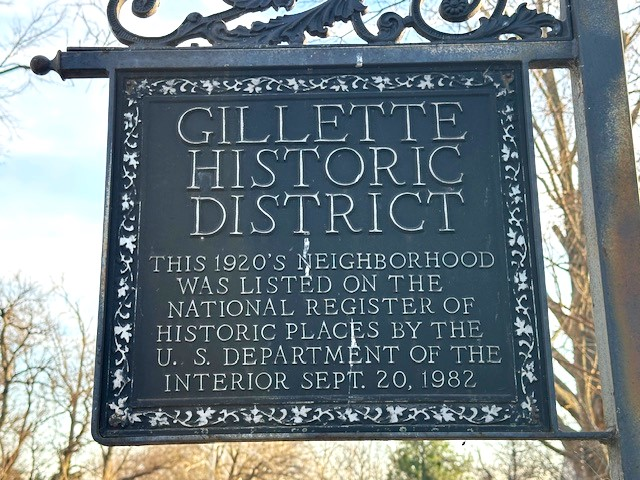
- Location: Tulsa, OK
- Coordinates: 36.13913°N 95.95997°W
- Built: 1922
- Architectural style: Bungalow/craftsman, Tudor Revival
- NRHP reference No.: 82003702
- Added to NRHP: September 20, 1982

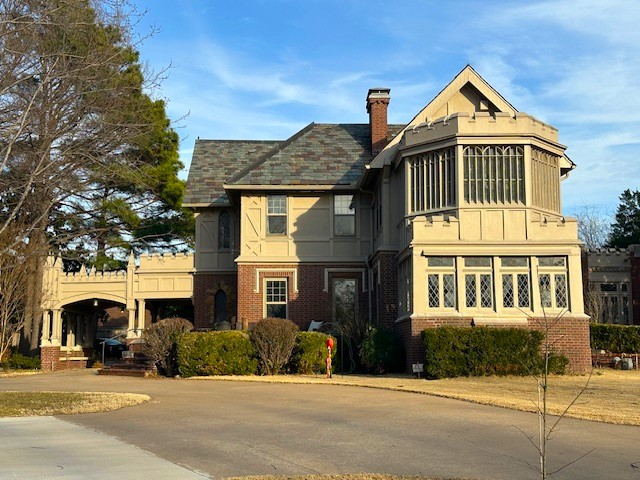
The Gillette Mansion in February of 2026

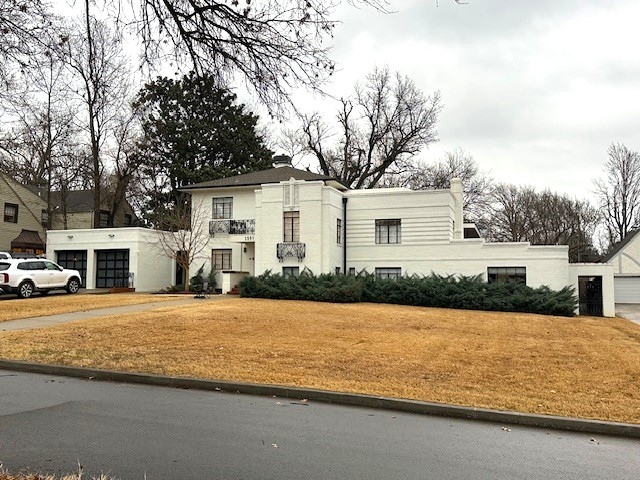
McGay residence in Gillette Historic District, 2-2026

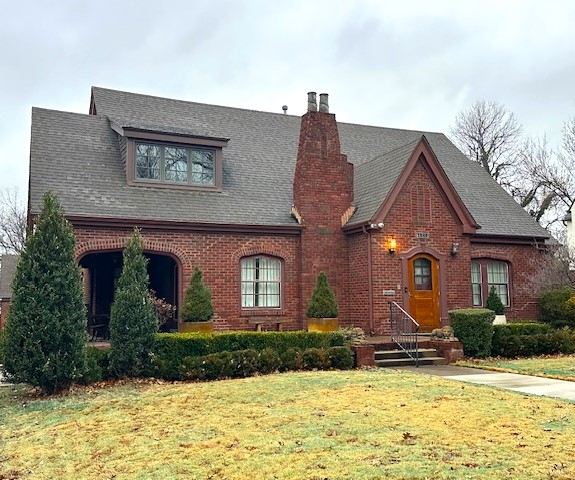
Tulsa World model home, Gillette District, 2-2026

Gillette Historic District (GHD) is a residential area in the Midtown section of Tulsa, Oklahoma. It consists of the homes on Gillette Avenue and Yorktown Place, and is bounded by 15th Street on the north, (Note: The 15th street boundary is irregular and includes only the Gillette Mansion at 2130 East 15th. It excludes business properties on the south side of the street by running along the alley behind these properties.) the alley between Gillette Street and Lewis Avenue on the east, 17th Street on the south and the alley between Yorktown Place and Yorktown Avenue. It contains 31 single-family homes and 6 duplexes that were constructed between 1924 and 1941. The district (and Gillette Street) were named for James Max Gillette, a merchant, real estate entrepreneur and oilman who built his home in what is now the district in 1921.

== General description ==
Tulsa's smallest historic district, GHD contains thirty-one single family residences and six duplexes built between 1922 and 1941. These original structures established the original integrity of the district. Five additional residences have been built within the past ten years. The most significant new buildings are four single-family residences directly south of the Gillette Mansion.

The buildings in this district are generally large, traditional, two-story buildings on large lots along the boulevard-style South Yorktown Place. These houses were originally built for business executives. The most prominent building is the Gillette Mansion, built by J. M. Gillette. This mansion appears to have established a general character for the district. Many of the subsequent buildings display elements and details similar to those of the Mansion.

John H. Hopping, who founded the Fourth National Bank in Tulsa, built a house southeast of the Gillette mansion in 1922. He named the street in front of his house Norvesta Avenue, which was changed to South Gillette Avenue when the neighborhood was annexed by Tulsa. (Note: Norvesta was a portmanteau of the names of Hopping's three children Norris, Velma and Esta.) The houses along South Gillette Avenue are generally smaller one- and two-story cottage and bungalow styles built on narrower lots. They were designed to attract less affluent middle managers.

Architecturally, the district is highlighted by the Gillette Mansion at 1521 South Yorktown Place, the McGay residence at 1551 South Yorktown Place, and the 1923 Tulsa World Model Home at 1546 South Yorktown Place. While these are also the most notable historically, the remainder of the district, especially the residences along South Gillette Avenue, represent the transition from the bungalow style to the cottage style as the dominant form of residential design and construction.

== NRHP listing ==
The Tulsa Preservation Society surveyed the neighborhood in 1978 and, after meeting with governmental preservation, determined that it satisfied the requirements for being named a Historic District. The Gillette Historic District Association was formed in 1979 to coordinate preservation activities within the neighborhood and to assist in preparing the nomination for the National Register of Historic Places (NRHP). The Association voted to have the City of Tulsa place the district under Historic Preservation Zoning, to protect it from improper infill, demolition, or rehabilitation. (Note: The first time this zoning application was used in Tulsa.) The district was added to the Oklahoma Landmarks Inventory on January 17, 1979.

The Gillette District was placed on the National Register of Historic Places on September 20, 1982. It was listed under National Register Criteria C, and its NRIS number is 82003702.
