= Carlos R. Tobar =

Ecuadorian politician and diplomat (1853–1920)

Carlos Rodolfo Tobar y Guarderas (November 4, 1853, Quito – April 19, 1920, Barcelona) was an Ecuadorian politician and diplomat. He is most well known for the Tobar Doctrine, which he advanced in 1907 as Foreign Minister of Ecuador, holding that states should not recognize governments arising from revolutions or coups.

The Tobar Doctrine was agreed by the five signatories in the Central American Treaty of 1907 (also known as the General Treaty of Peace and Amity) and affirmed in a 1923 convention signed at the Central American Conferences. While the United States was not a signatory to either treaty, the doctrine has been referenced by U.S. governments, first by President Woodrow Wilson when he did not recognize the Huerta government of Mexico. The doctrine was later modified by the Betancourt doctrine, which restricted the non-recognition to governments coming to power through coups.
