= González Suárez =

Electoral parish in Quito, Ecuador

González Suárez is an electoral parish (parroquia electorale urban) or district of Quito. The parish was established as a result of the October 2004 political elections when the city was divided into 19 urban electoral parishes. It is named for Federico González Suárez, the Archbishop of Quito from December 14, 1905, to December 6, 1917.
