= La Magdalena, Quito =

Ecuadorian electoral district

Coordinates: 0.243°S 78.529°W

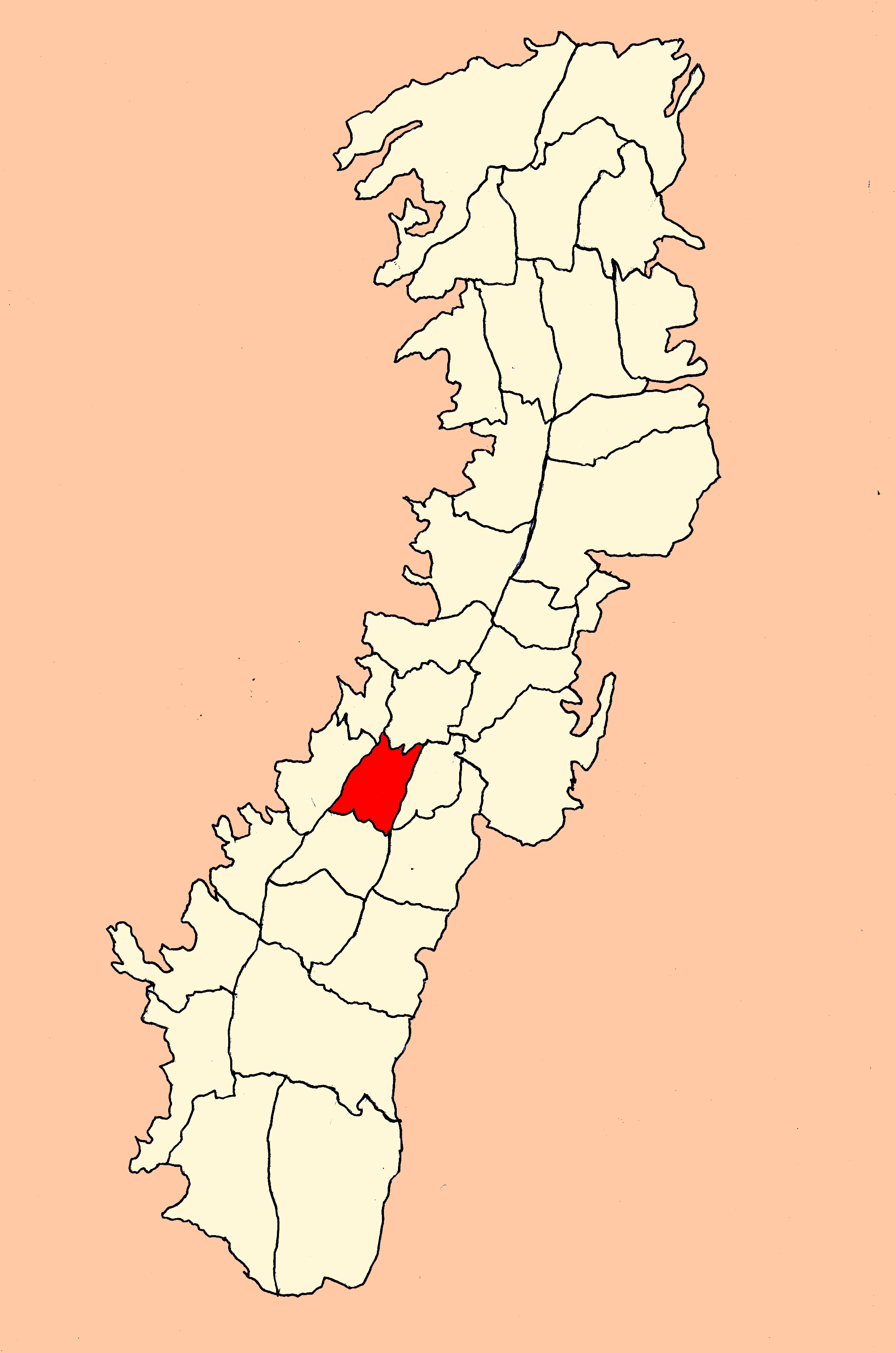
Magdalena

La Magdalena is an electoral parish (parroquia electorale urban) or district of Quito, the capital city of Ecuador. The parish was established as a result of the October 2004 political elections when the city was divided into 19 urban electoral parishes.
