= Luis Cordero Crespo =

President of Ecuador (1892–1895)

Luis Benjamín Cordero y Crespo
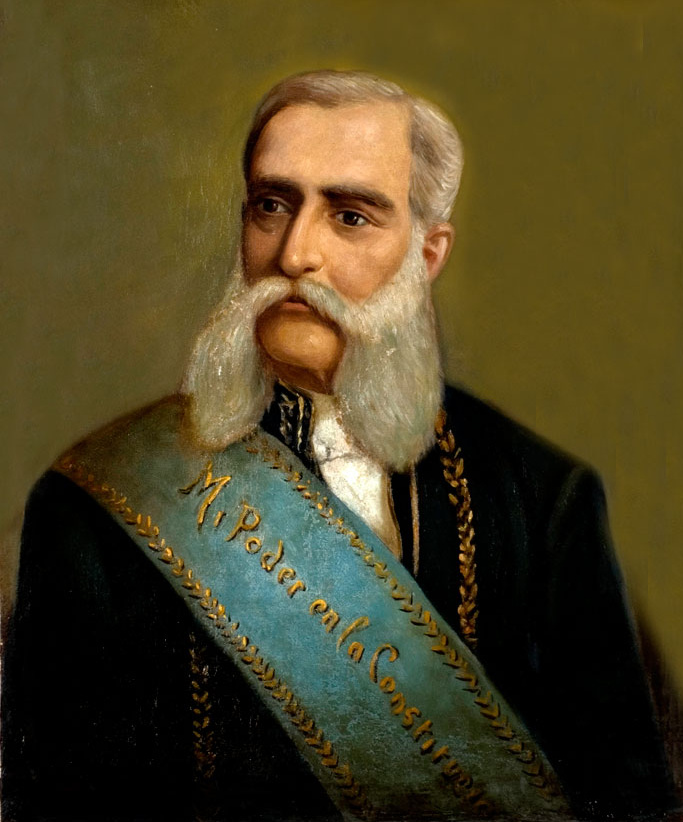

14th President of Ecuador
- In office 1 July 1892 – 16 April 1895
- Vice President: Pablo Herrera; Vicente Lucio Salazar
- Preceded by: Antonio Flores Jijón
- Succeeded by: Vicente Lucio Salazar

President of the Provisional Government of Quito
- In office 14 February 1883 – 9 July 1883
- Preceded by: José María Sarasti
- Succeeded by: Rafael Pérez Pareja

Member of the Provisional Government of Quito
- In office 14 February 1883 – 11 October 1883

Personal details
- Born: 6 April 1833 Déleg, Cañar, Ecuador
- Died: 30 January 1912 (aged 78) Cuenca, Ecuador
- Party: Progresistas
- Spouses: Jesús Dávila Heredia (m. 1867; died 1891) Josefina Espinosa Astorga (m. 1896; died 1900)

Luis Benjamín Cordero y Crespo (6 April 1833 – 30 January 1912) was President of Ecuador 1 July 1892 to 16 April 1895.

Cordero was born 6 April 1833 in the Cañar province of Ecuador to parents Gregorio Cordero and Josefa Crespo. Cordero studied at the Seminary High School in Cuenca, and later the Central University of Ecuador in Quito. In 1865 he became a lawyer, arguing cases before the Supreme Court of Cuenca. After his career in law, Cordero began publishing poetry and in 1892 published the first Kichwa-Spanish dictionary.

== Political career ==
Luis Cordero was also a politician, serving as a member of the Progresistas, a liberal Catholic political party, and was a member of the provisional governing junta which led the Progresistas to power in 1883. He was President of the Senate in 1885.

In 1892 Cordero became president of Ecuador. Despite being a popular leader, Luis Cordero was forced to leave office following an international political scandal known as La venta de la bandera, or the sale of the flag. During the First Sino-Japanese War, the Ecuadorian ambassador to Chile sold weapons to Japan on behalf of Chilean businessmen, despite Chile's declared neutrality. The shipment was detained while sporting the Ecuadorian flag to cover for Chile's involvement, so the public blamed Cordero who, after a short armed conflict, was forced to resign. Former president and then-Governor of Guayas province, José María Plácido Caamaño, was discovered to be involved in the affair, so he was forced into exile where he died. In 1898 the Ecuadorian Supreme Court dropped all charges against Cordero after the Ecuadorian ambassador's involvement came to light.

Luis Cordero wrote poems in Spanish and Kichwa and published the first Kichwa-Spanish-Kichwa dictionary in Ecuador in 1892.

== Works ==
- Dos cantos a la Raza Latina
- Elogio de Malo y Solano
- Poesías Jocosas
- Poesías Serias
- El Rimini llacta y el Cuchiquillca
- El Adios
- Luis Cordero (1892): Quichua Shimiyuc Panca: Quichua-Castilla, Castilla-Quichua = Diccionario Quichua Quichua-Castellano, Castellano-Quichua. Coleccion Kashcanchicracmi, 1, 427 pankakuna, 4th edition, January 1989, ISBN 9978-84-042-7

Political offices
Preceded by Antonio Flores	President of Ecuador; 1892–1895	Succeeded by Vicente Lucio Salazar
