= Francisco Andrade Marín =

Ecuadorian politician

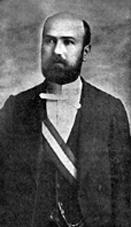

Acting President of Ecuador
- In office 6 March 1912 – 10 August 1912
- Preceded by: Carlos Freile Zaldumbide
- Succeeded by: Alfredo Baquerizo

Personal details
- Born: 15 November 1841 Ibarra, Ecuador
- Died: 9 May 1935 (aged 92) Quito, Ecuador
- Party: Ecuadorian Radical Liberal Party
- Spouse: Ana María Malo
- Children: 12

Francisco Higinio Andrade Marín (15 November 1841 – 6 September 1935) was an Ecuadorian politician. He was Minister of Finance in 1894. He was President of the Chamber of Deputies in 1911. He was acting President of Ecuador from 6 March to 10 August 1912.

== Political life ==
=== Mayoralties ===
He was elected mayor of Quito four times: 1878, 1888, 1892 and 1905. At that time the mayor's term was only one year long, beginning on 1 January and ending on 31 December. The first time he took office, he built a road between Quito and the town of La Magdalena, donating part of his land on Guayaquil and Ambato streets, where a small plaza still stands today.

== Rector ==
He served as rector of the Central University of Ecuador, in Quito, during the period 1908 - 1910.

Political offices
Preceded by Carlos Freile Zaldumbide	President of Ecuador; 1912	Succeeded by Alfredo Baquerizo
Preceded by Alejandro Cárdenas Proaño	President of the National Court of Justice; 1914	Succeeded by Leopoldo Pino Oquendo
