= Lizardo García =

Lizardo García Sorroza
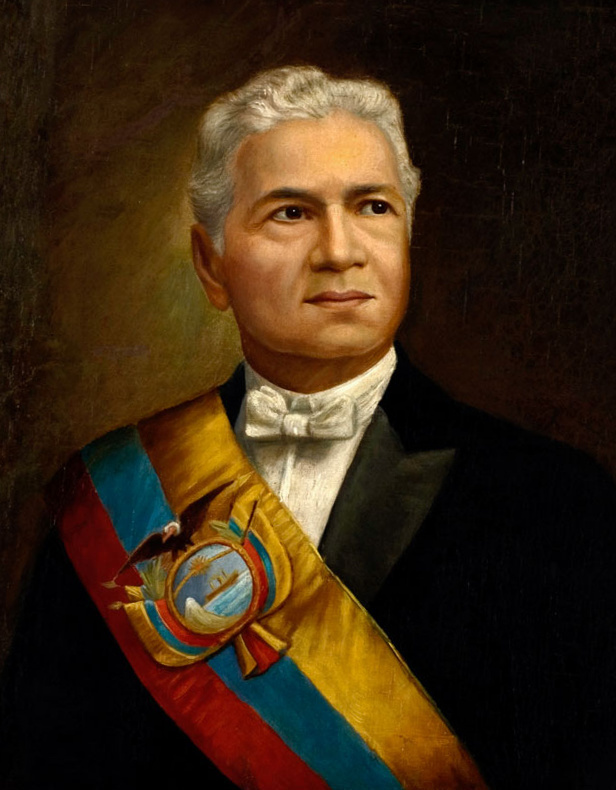

17th President of Ecuador
- In office 1 September 1905 – 15 January 1906
- Vice President: Alfredo Baquerizo
- Preceded by: Leónidas Plaza
- Succeeded by: Eloy Alfaro

Personal details
- Born: 26 April 1844 Guayaquil, Ecuador
- Died: 29 May 1937 (aged 93) Guayaquil, Ecuador
- Party: Radical Liberal Party

Lizardo García Sorroza (26 April 1844 – 29 May 1937) was President of Ecuador from 1 September 1905 to 15 January 1906.

== Life ==
García was born in Guayaquil. He founded the chamber of commerce of Guayaquil and was a member of the firefighters of his hometown. He married Carmen Coello Alvarez and the couple had a son and two daughters.

== Political life ==
- Minister of Finance in 1895
- Senator for the province Guayas
- Vice President of the Senate
- Councilman of Guayaquil

Garcia was also a candidate in the presidential election of 1901, but lost to Leonidas Plaza.

== Presidency ==
Garcia was elected president in 1905, but only served for a few months. He was overthrown by the revolution led by Eloy Alfaro and was forced to leave office.

Political offices
| Preceded by Leonidas Plaza | President of Ecuador; 1905–1906 | Succeeded by Eloy Alfaro |
