= Global Health Delivery Project =

Public health project of Harvard University, US

The Global Health Delivery Project is a project at Harvard University that aims to improve health among disadvantaged populations worldwide by improving practitioners' access to health delivery information.

== History ==
GHD was founded in 2007 by Dr. Jim Yong Kim, Dr. Paul Farmer and Harvard Business School Professor Michael Porter and is operated under the guidance of Harvard Medical School, Harvard School of Public Health, Brigham and Women’s Hospital and Partners in Health.

GHD was part of the World Health Organization’s Maximizing Positive Synergies Project, that investigated the interactions between global health initiatives and health systems.
