= Carlos Freile Zaldumbide =

Ecuadorian politician

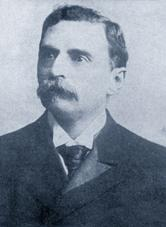

Acting President of Ecuador
- In office 22 December 1911 – 5 March 1912
- Preceded by: Emilio Estrada
- Succeeded by: Francisco Andrade Marín
- In office 11 August 1911 – 31 August 1911
- Preceded by: Eloy Alfaro
- Succeeded by: Emilio Estrada

Vice President of Ecuador
- In office 1899–1903
- Preceded by: Manuel Benigno Cueva
- Succeeded by: Alfredo Baquerizo

Personal details
- Born: 18 May 1851 Quito, Ecuador
- Died: 28 August 1928 (aged 77) Paris, France

Carlos Freile Zaldumbide (18 May 1851 – 28 August 1928) was an Ecuadorian politician, who served twice as acting president of Ecuador and one term as Vice President of Ecuador.

Freile was born in Quito, Ecuador on 18 May 1851.

Freile was a wealthy landowner who pioneered the raising of Holstein livestock in Ecuador. He served as vice president to President Eloy Alfaro Delgado from 31 August 1899 to 31 August 1903. He was President of the Senate in 1904 and again 1910–1911. He later became the acting president of Ecuador on 12 August 1911 following the overthrow and exile of President Eloy Alfaro. After 21 days in office, Freile was replaced by the newly elected president Emilio Estrada on 1 September 1911. Estrada died three months later, on 21 December 1911, and Freile again served as acting president until 6 March 1912 when he was succeeded by Francisco Andrade Marín.

He died in Paris, France on August 28, 1928.

Political offices
Preceded by Manuel Benigno Cueva	Vice President of Ecuador; 1899-1903	Succeeded by Alfredo Baquerizo
Preceded by Eloy Alfaro	President of Ecuador; 1911	Succeeded by Emilio Estrada
Preceded by Emilio Estrada	President of Ecuador; 1911-1912	Succeeded by Francisco Andrade Marín
