= Emilio Estrada Carmona =

President of Ecuador (1911)

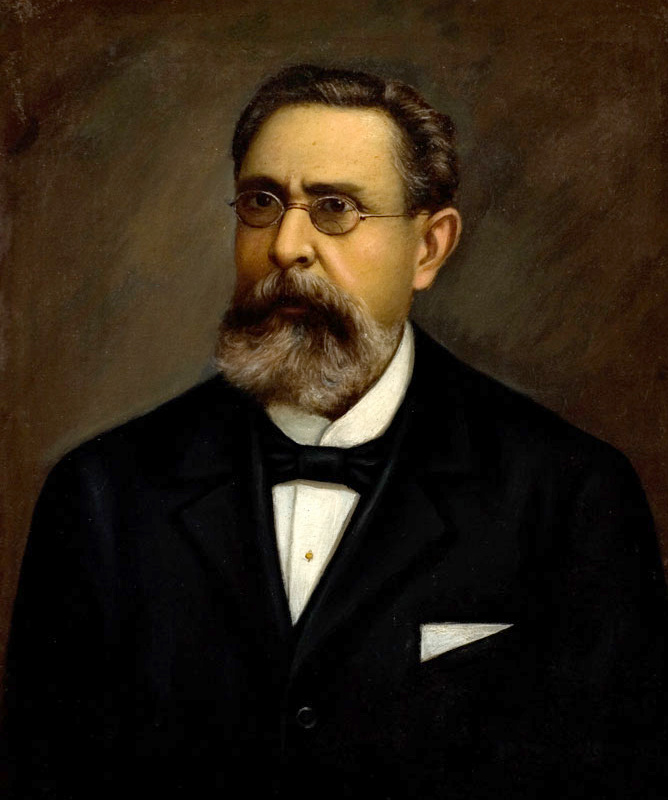

18th President of Ecuador
- In office 1 September 1911 – 21 December 1911
- Preceded by: Carlos Freire Zaldumbide
- Succeeded by: Carlos Freire Zaldumbide

Personal details
- Born: 28 May 1855; Quito, Ecuador
- Died: 21 December 1911 (aged 56); Guayaquil, Ecuador
- Cause of death: Heart attack
- Spouse: Lastenia Gamarra (m. 1911)

Emilio Estrada Carmona (28 May 1855 – 21 December 1911) was President of Ecuador from 1 September until his death from a heart attack on 21 December 1911.

He was elected President in January 1911.

Political offices
Preceded by Carlos Freile Zaldumbide	President of Ecuador; 1911	Succeeded by Carlos Freile Zaldumbide
