= Ecuadorian Radical Liberal Party =

Defunct political party in Ecuador

Ecuadorian Radical Liberal Party Partido Liberal Radical Ecuatoriano
- Abbreviation: PLRE
- Historical leaders: Eloy Alfaro; Leónidas Plaza; Alfredo Baquerizo; Lizardo García; Carlos Alberto Río; Aurelio Mosquera
- Founder: Eloy Alfaro
- Founded: 1878
- Dissolved: 2006
- Merged into: Alfarista Radical Front
- Headquarters: Quito
- Ideology: Liberalism; Radicalism
- Political position: Centre-left
- International affiliation: Liberal International
- Colors: Red

The Ecuadorian Radical Liberal Party (Spanish: Partido Liberal Radical Ecuatoriano, abbreviated as PLRE) was a liberal party in Ecuador. Prior to its dissolution in 2006, it was one of the oldest existing political parties in Ecuador.

== History ==
The party evolved out of divisions between moderate and radical liberals in the Liberal Party of Ecuador. As in many Latin American countries, Ecuador has experienced much conflict, often violent, between the Liberal and Conservative parties.

Eloy Alfaro brought the Liberal Party to power during the revolution of 1895. In 1925, the Liberal Party was officially founded as the Ecuadorian Radical Liberal Party (PLRE). Over the next 50 years several of its members served as presidents of Ecuador. The party was in power from 1895 to 1911, from 1921 to 1952 and from 1960 to 1970. During each period of power the party was overthrown by military coups.

In 2000, and after a difficult period of time when the party was almost disappearing, Julio Eduardo Ponce Arteta stepped to the challenge as National Director of the PLRE and made the Liberal Party participate in the presidential elections again with the party's candidate, Ivonne Baki. Couple of years later the party was unable to fulfill the necessary 5% of votes required to remain a valid political entity, the PLRE ceased to officially exist. Nonetheless, the PLRE retains recognition for its important role in Ecuadorian history and has reputedly inspired several other political parties. Similarly, the PLRE's founding leader, Eloy Alfaro, is still widely revered in Ecuador.

In 2008, a political party with the same name was registered for the 2009 presidential elections.

== See also ==
- Liberalism and radicalism in Ecuador
