= Leónidas Plaza =

President of Ecuador

Leónidas Plaza Gutiérrez
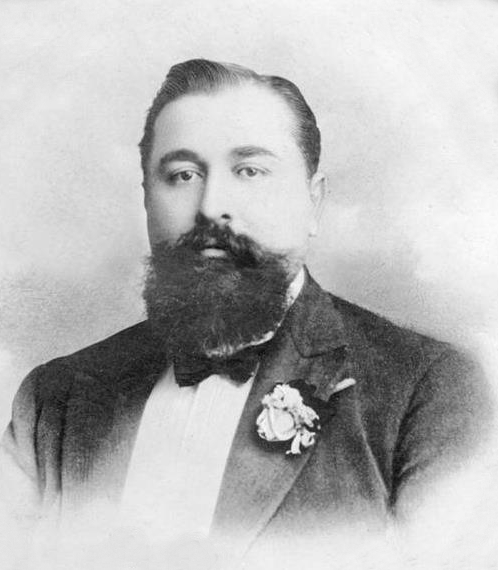

16th President of Ecuador
- In office 1 September 1912 – 31 August 1916
- Preceded by: Francisco Andrade Marín
- Succeeded by: Alfredo Baquerizo Moreno
- In office 1 September 1901 – 31 August 1905
- Vice President: Carlos Freire Zaldumbide (1901—1903); Alfredo Baquerizo (1903—1905)
- Preceded by: Eloy Alfaro
- Succeeded by: Lizardo García

Personal details
- Born: Leónidas Plaza Gutiérrez y Caviedes; 18 April 1865 Charapotó, Manabí Province, Ecuador
- Died: 17 November 1933 (aged 68) Huigra, Guayas, Ecuador
- Party: Ecuadorian Radical Liberal Party
- Spouse: Avelina Lasso Ascázubi (m. 1905)
- Children: Galo Plaza Lasso
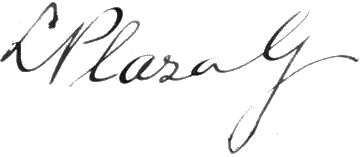
- Signature

Leónidas Plaza y Gutiérrez y Caviedes (18 April 1865 – 17 November 1933) was an Ecuadorian politician who was the President of Ecuador from 1 September 1901 to 31 August 1905 and again from 1 September 1912 to 31 August 1916.

He was the son of José Buenaventura Plaza, a school teacher and, Alegría Gutiérrez y Caviedes Sevillano, an attractive tall woman with aristocratic features and exquisite social manners of Colombian descendancy. He married María Avelina Lasso Ascázubi, with whom he had eight children. One of them, Galo Plaza, was also president of Ecuador. He was Presidents of the Chamber of Deputies in 1900. He was Minister of Finance in 1911.

Political offices
Preceded by Eloy Alfaro	President of Ecuador; 1901–1905	Succeeded by Lizardo García
Preceded by Alfredo Baquerizo	President of Ecuador; 1912–1916	Succeeded by Alfredo Baquerizo
