= Eloy Alfaro =

President of Ecuador (1842–1912)

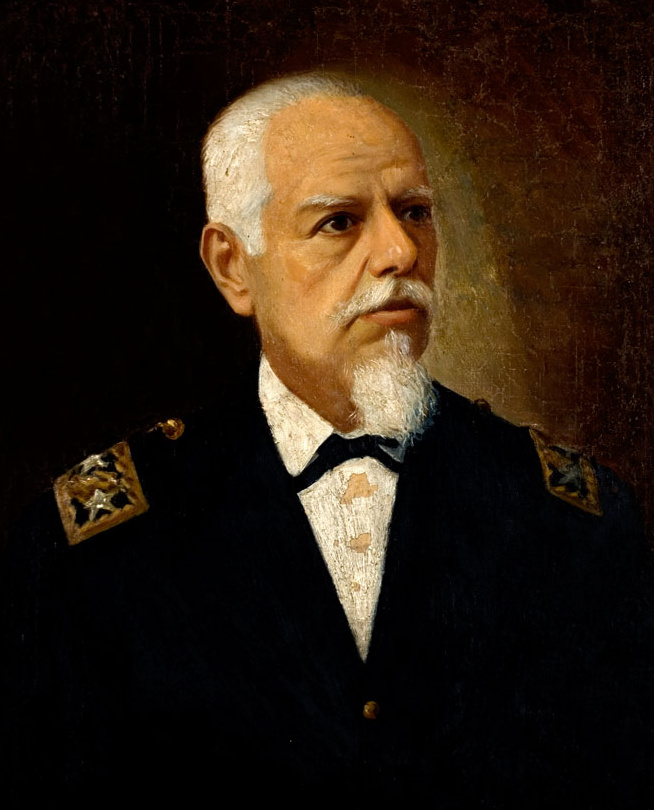
- Eloy Alfaro c. 1910

15th President of Ecuador
- In office 16 January 1906 – 12 August 1911
- Preceded by: Lizardo García
- Succeeded by: Carlos Freile Zaldumbide
- In office 5 June 1895 – 31 August 1901
- Vice President: Manuel Benigno Cueva (1897—1899); Carlos Freire Zaldumbide (1899—1901)
- Preceded by: Vicente Lucio Salazar
- Succeeded by: Leónidas Plaza

Supreme Chief of Manabí & Esmeraldas, in rebellion
- In office February 1883 – 11 October 1883

Personal details
- Born: José Eloy Alfaro Delgado; 25 June 1842 Montecristi, Ecuador
- Died: 28 January 1912 (aged 69) Quito, Ecuador
- Party: Ecuadorian Radical Liberal Party (Founder)
- Spouse: Ana Paredes Arosemena (m. 1872)

José Eloy Alfaro Delgado (25 June 1842 – 28 January 1912) often referred to as "The Old Warrior," was an Ecuadorian politician who served as the President of Ecuador from 1895 to 1901 and from 1906 to 1911. Eloy Alfaro emerged as the leader of the Liberal Party and defined the party while he lived. He became one of the strongest opponents of the pro-Catholic conservative President Gabriel García Moreno (1821–1875). Alfaro played a central role in the Liberal Revolution of 1895 and fought against political conservatism in Ecuador for almost 30 years.

Alfaro's major political legacies are considered to be strengthened national unity, securing the integrity of Ecuador's borders, and the increased secularization of the country. Alfaro led the modernization of Ecuadorian society through the introduction of new ideas, education, and systems of public transport and communication, including the engineering feat of the Transandino Railway linking Guayaquil with Quito. Alfaro's effigy appeared on the Ecuadorian 50-cent coin from the 2000 issue, and the Ecuadorian Army's military college bears his name, as have two ships of the Ecuadorian Navy.

== Biography ==
=== Rebellious youth ===
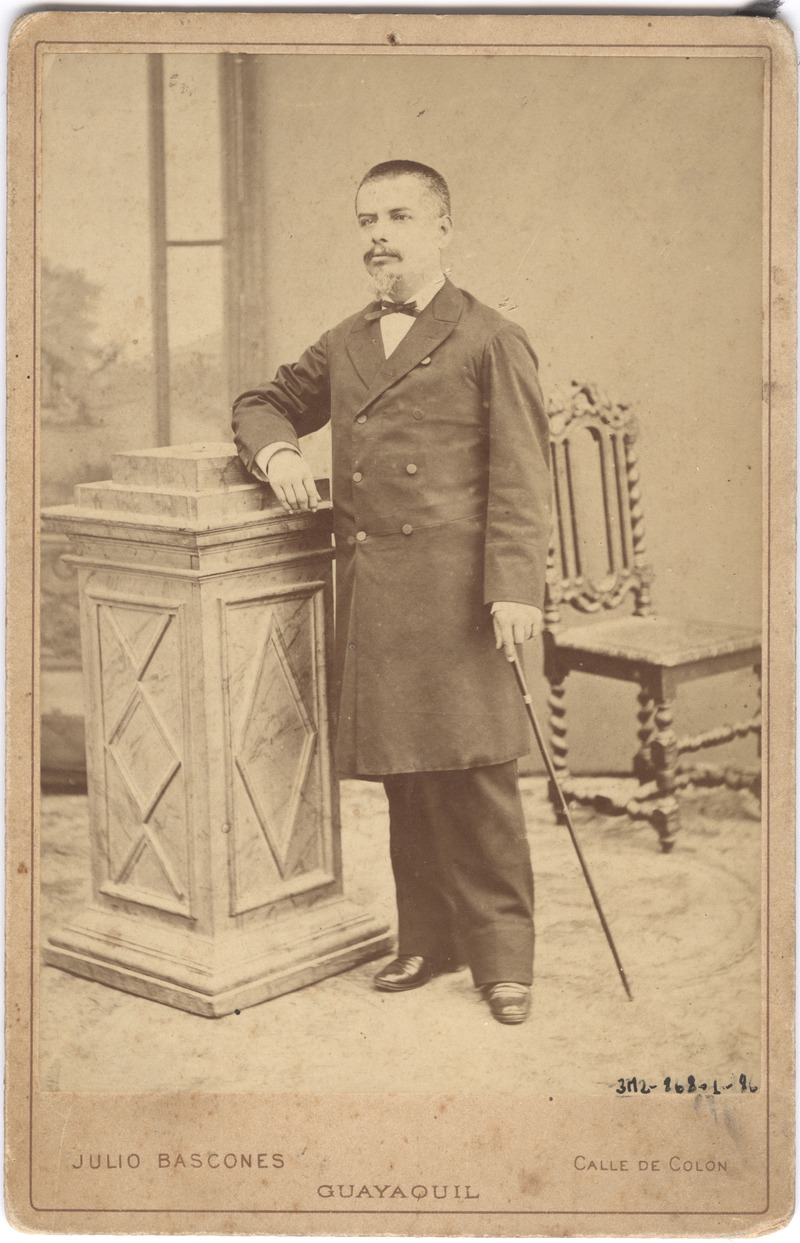
Eloy Alfaro

Alfaro was born in Montecristi, Manabí, on 25 June 1842. His father was don Manuel Alfaro y González, a Spanish Republican native of Cervera del Río Alhama, La Rioja, Spain who arrived in Ecuador as a political exile; his mother was doña María Natividad Delgado López.

Alfaro received his primary education in his place of birth. After graduation he dedicated himself to helping his father with his business negotiations. During his youth he aligned himself with anticlerical liberalism, a doctrine later embodied in the Ecuadorian Radical Liberal Party. He fought against Presidents García Moreno, Borrero, Veintemilla and Camaño, and as a result he is traditionally known as the "Viejo Luchador" (Old Warrior). Eloy Alfaro experienced many serious difficulties in the various campaigns he initiated against the conservative Ecuadorian governments. He spent his fortune, acquired with the help of his Panamanian wife, Ana Paredes Arosemena, in those battles. Nine children were born of their marriage: Bolívar, Esmeraldas, Colombia, Colón, Bolívar(2), Ana María, América, Olmedo, and Colón Eloy; Rafael was born out of wedlock.

From a very early age Alfaro participated in acts of rebellion. He almost lost his life in the disastrous naval battle of Alajuela when he tried to disembark in Ecuador with a troop of revolutionaries and was defeated by Conservative Government forces. When his ship sank, he saved himself from drowning by clinging to a barrel. He participated in the battles of Montecristi, San Mateo, Esmeraldas, Guayaquil, Jaramijó, Gatazo, Cuenca, and Chasqui.

Alfaro was a model father and was magnanimous with friends and the destitute. He supported various liberals, such as the writer Juan Montalvo, to whom he offered monetary assistance. Once in power, he glorified the memory of Montalvo as a great teacher and an example to the Ecuadorian people. Even though Alfaro was not very well-educated, through force of character he was able to overcome this fault and impress others with his clear intelligence. During his exile, he travelled Central America and was granted the rank of "General de División" by the Nicaraguan Congress.

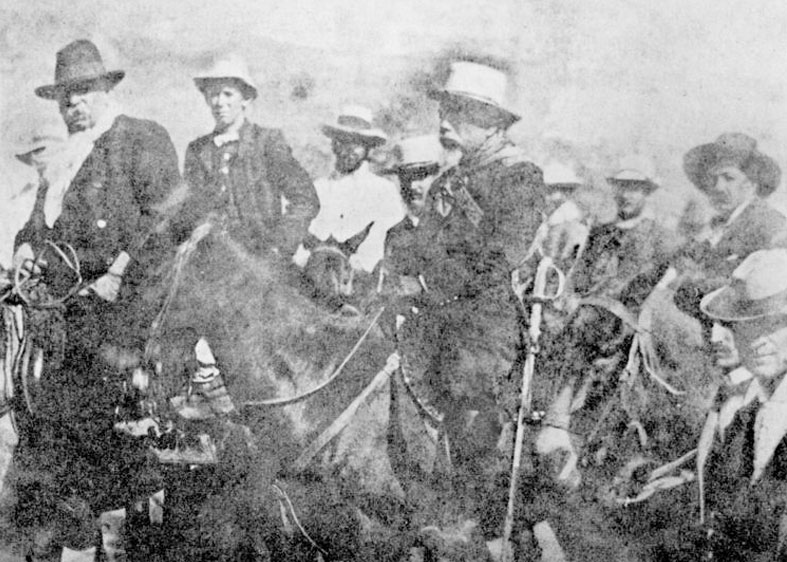
Representation of the Battle of Chasqui, you can see the montoneros of Eloy Alfaro before the battle.

=== First presidency (1895–1901) ===
Alfaro, head of the Radical Liberals, was the leader of the Ecuadorian Liberal Revolution, carrying out a struggle that he waged from his youth in the 1860s until 1895 when the liberals finally took power in a coup d'état. In this uprising, he deposed President Vicente Lucio Salazar and declared himself a dictator on 5 June 1895 and was later named constitutional president from 17 January 1897 until 1 September 1901. The principal accomplishment of his first government was the introduction of the principle of secularism. Many public buildings in Quito including the Instituto Nacional Mejía and the first purpose build siege of the National Polytechnic School were commissioned in his administration to French architects.

=== Second presidency (1906–1911) ===
After initially supporting, but later coming to oppose, his successor, in 1906 he led another revolt, deposing elected President Lizardo García, being declared supreme dictator by the army and continuing in office until 12 August 1911. During this second presidency he enacted a number of changes, among them freedom of speech and the legalization of civil marriage and divorce. He constructed numerous public schools and inaugurated the right to a free and secular education. What is considered to be his greatest public work during this period was the completion of the Ferrocarril Transandino (Trans-Andean Railroad) connecting Guayaquil to Quito. Consistent with his anticlericalism, he suppressed the influence of the Catholic Church while in office. He seized much property of the Church, expelled religious orders and prohibited the establishment of any new monasteries or convents. His attempts to secularize Ecuadorian society were opposed by the Archbishop of Quito Federico González Suárez.

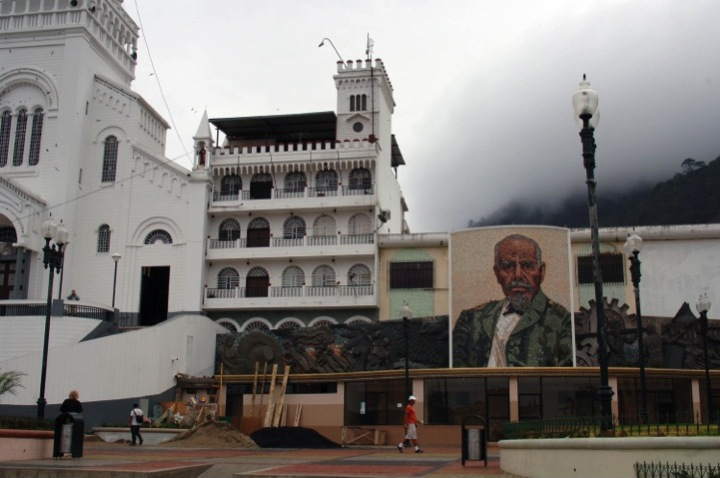
Mosaic of Eloy Alfaro in his hometown of Montecristi

In 1911, he was removed from office by his former supporters. In 1911 he tried to strike a blow at the State in an attempt to return to power. He was captured near Guayaquil and sent to Quito on the railroad he had constructed. After he left office, during the administration of Emilio Estrada Carmona, Alfaro was severely critical of the government and his followers soon began to organize a series of military insurrections. Alfaro was exiled to Panama during the interim government of Carlos Freile Zaldumbide. He returned to Ecuador on 4 January 1912, and attempted another coup but was defeated, arrested and jailed by General Leonidas Plaza.

=== Assassination ===
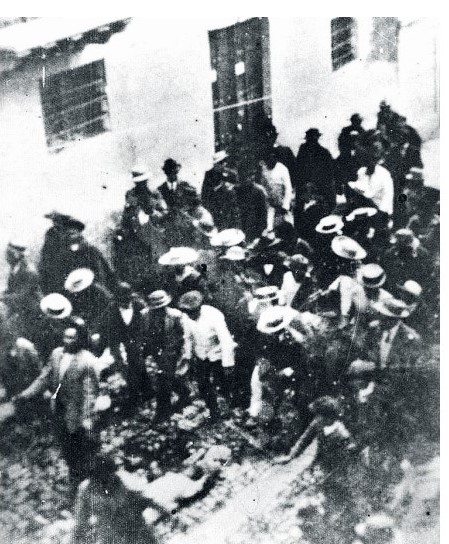

On 28 January 1912, a group of pro-Catholic soldiers whose motto was "Muerte al indio Alfaro" (death to the Indian Alfaro), supported by a mob, broke into the prison where Alfaro and his colleagues were detained and dragged them along the cobbled streets of the city center. They were all dead when the horde arrived at the esplanade of El Ejido (city gardens) in the northern outskirts of town. The crowd finally burnt the corpses in the area where the present day park of El Ejido is located. (A monument was erected in the 1960s at the site.) Days later, Alfaro's remains were buried in Quito, in secret. They were transported to Guayaquil and deposited in a mausoleum there at some time in the 1940s. On the initiative of President Rafael Correa (in office from 2007 – 2017), some of the ashes of Eloy Alfaro were exhumed and re-interred with honors in the city of Montecristi, seat of the 2008 National Constitutional Convention.

== Legacy ==
The Alfaro Civic Center in Montecristi is a 5.4 hectare civic center named after and paying tribute to Alfaro.

Political offices
Preceded by Vicente Lucio Salazar	President of Ecuador; 1895–1901	Succeeded by Leónidas Plaza
Preceded by Lizardo García	President of Ecuador; 1906–1911	Succeeded by Carlos Freile Zaldumbide
