= List of Lebanese people in Ecuador =

This is a list of notable individuals born in Ecuador of Lebanese ancestry or people of Lebanese and Ecuadoran dual nationality who live or lived in Ecuador.

== Athletes ==
- Abdalá Bucaram, Jr. – football (soccer) player (son of former President Abdalá Bucaram)

== Beauty pageant contestants ==
- Valeska Saab – Miss World Ecuador 2007

== Entertainment ==
- Diego Spotorno – actor and television presenter

== Musicians ==
- Jorge Saade – violinist
- Nicasio Safadi – musician

== Politicians ==
- Ivonne Baki – Minister of Tourism
- Abdalá Bucaram – former president
- Alberto Dahik – former vice president
- Jamil Mahuad – former president (1998–2000)
- Jaime Nebot – politician
- Julio Teodoro Salem – former president

== See also ==
- Lebanese Ecuadorian
- List of Lebanese people
- List of Lebanese people (Diaspora)
