= List of presidents of the Junior Chamber International =

The World President of the Junior Chamber International is elected annually at the JCI World Congress.

Year elected	Name of President	National Organization	Area	Note
1945/46	Raul Garcia Vidal	Mexico	the Americas	
1946/47	Erasmo A. Chambonnet	Panama	the Americas	
1947/48	C. Taylor Cole	United States	the Americas	
1948/49	Victor Boucas	Brazil	the Americas	
1949/50	Théo Staar	Belgium	Europe	First European elected
1950/51	Ramon V. del Rosario	Philippines	Asia-Pacific	First Asian elected
1951/52	Philip T. R. Pugsley	Canada	the Americas	
1952/53	Roberto Villanueva	Philippines	Asia-Pacific	
1954	Douglas L. Hoge	United States	the Americas	
1955	Peter B. Watts	New Zealand	Asia-Pacific	
1956	Arnaldo De Oliveira Sales	Hong Kong	Asia-Pacific	
1957	Ira D. Kaye	United States	the Americas	
1958	Alberto Philippe Morales	Mexico	the Americas	
1959	Maurice C. Sexton	New Zealand	Asia-Pacific	
1960	Milton Zapata	Puerto Rico	the Americas	
1961	Peter Frankel	Brazil	the Americas	
1962	Leslie M. Perrott	Australia	Asia-Pacific	
1963	Eric H. Stevenson	Scotland	Europe	
1964	Conrad O'Brien	Trinidad and Tobago (JCI West Indies)	the Americas	
1965	John D. Rundle	Australia	Asia-Pacific	
1966	Edward A. Merdes	United States	the Americas	
1967	Clifford E. Myatt	Puerto Rico	the Americas	
1968	Philippe Abravanel	Switzerland	Europe	
1969	Thomas E. Gates	United States	the Americas	
1970	Hiroshi Maeda	Japan	Asia-Pacific	
1971	Graham Sinclair	New Zealand	Asia-Pacific	
1972	Royce R. Pepin	Australia	Asia-Pacific	
1973	L. A. Roy Banarsee	Jamaica (JCI West Indies)	the Americas	
1974	A. Jay Smith	United States	the Americas	
1975	Jean Claude Féraud	France	Europe	
1976	Feliciano Belmonte	Philippines	Asia-Pacific	
1977	Ronald G. S. Au	United States	the Americas	
1978	Carl Peterson	Guam (JCI Pacific)	Asia-Pacific	
1979	Kumar Gera	India	Asia-Pacific	
1980	Patricio Izurieta	Ecuador	the Americas	
1981	Gary Nagao	Japan	Asia-Pacific	
1982	Barry Kennedy	United States	the Americas	
1983	Kjell Peterson	Sweden	Europe	
1984	Joe Murphy	Ireland	Europe	
1985	Victor C. Luciano	Philippines	Asia-Pacific	
1986	Mohammed Moncef Barouni	Tunisia	Africa and the Middle East	First African elected
1987	Phil Berry	United States	the Americas	
1988	Jennifer Yu	Hong Kong	Asia-Pacific	First woman elected
1989	Isfahani Sameen	Sri Lanka	Asia-Pacific	
1990	Jorge Suncar Morales	Dominican Republic	the Americas	
1991	Reginald Schaumans	Belgium	Europe	
1992	Albert Hiribarrondo	France	Europe	
1993	Robby Dawkins	United States	the Americas	
1994	Arnaud Godère	Mauritius	Africa and the Middle East	
1995	David Hide Oji	Japan	Asia-Pacific	
1996	Thomas Clear III	United States	the Americas	
1997	Crispin Dy	Philippines	Asia-Pacific	
1998	Petri Niskanen	Finland	Europe	
1999	Yong Suk Choi	Korea	Asia-Pacific	
2000	Karyn Bisdee	New Zealand	Asia-Pacific	
2001	Georges A. Bouverat	Switzerland	Europe	
2002	Salvador Batlle	Catalonia	Europe	
2003	Bruce Rector	United States	the Americas	
2004	Fernando Sanchez-Arias	Venezuela	the Americas	
2005	Kevin Cullinane	Ireland	Europe	
2006	Lars Hajslund	Denmark	Europe	
2007	Scott Greenlee	United States	the Americas	
2008	Graham Hanlon	Ireland	Europe	
2009	Jun Sup Shin	Korea	Asia-Pacific	
2010	Roland Kwemain	Cameroon	Africa and the Middle East	
2011	Kentaro Harada	Japan	Asia-Pacific	
2012	Bertolt Daems	Netherlands	Europe	
2013	Chiara Milani	Italy	Europe	
2014	Shine Bhaskaran	India	Asia-Pacific	
2015	Ismail Haznedar	Turkiye	Europe	
2016	Paschal Dike	Nigeria	Africa and the Middle East	
2017	Dawn Hetzel	United States	the Americas	
2018	Marc Brian Lim	Philippines	Asia-Pacific	
2019	Alexander Tio	Indonesia	Asia-Pacific	
2020	Itai Arthur Manyere	Zimbabwe	Africa and the Middle East	
2021	Ryubun Kojima	Japan	Asia-Pacific	
2022	Argenis Angulo	Venezuela	the Americas	
2023	Viktor Ómarsson	Iceland	Europe	
2024	Kaveen Kumar Kumaravel	India	Asia-Pacific	
2025	Keisuke Shimoyamada	Japan	Asia-Pacific	
2026	Alejandra Castillo	Bolivia	the Americas	
2027	Nihal Zoroğlu	Turkiye	Europe	
