= Lebanese Ecuadorians =

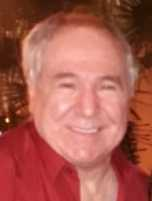
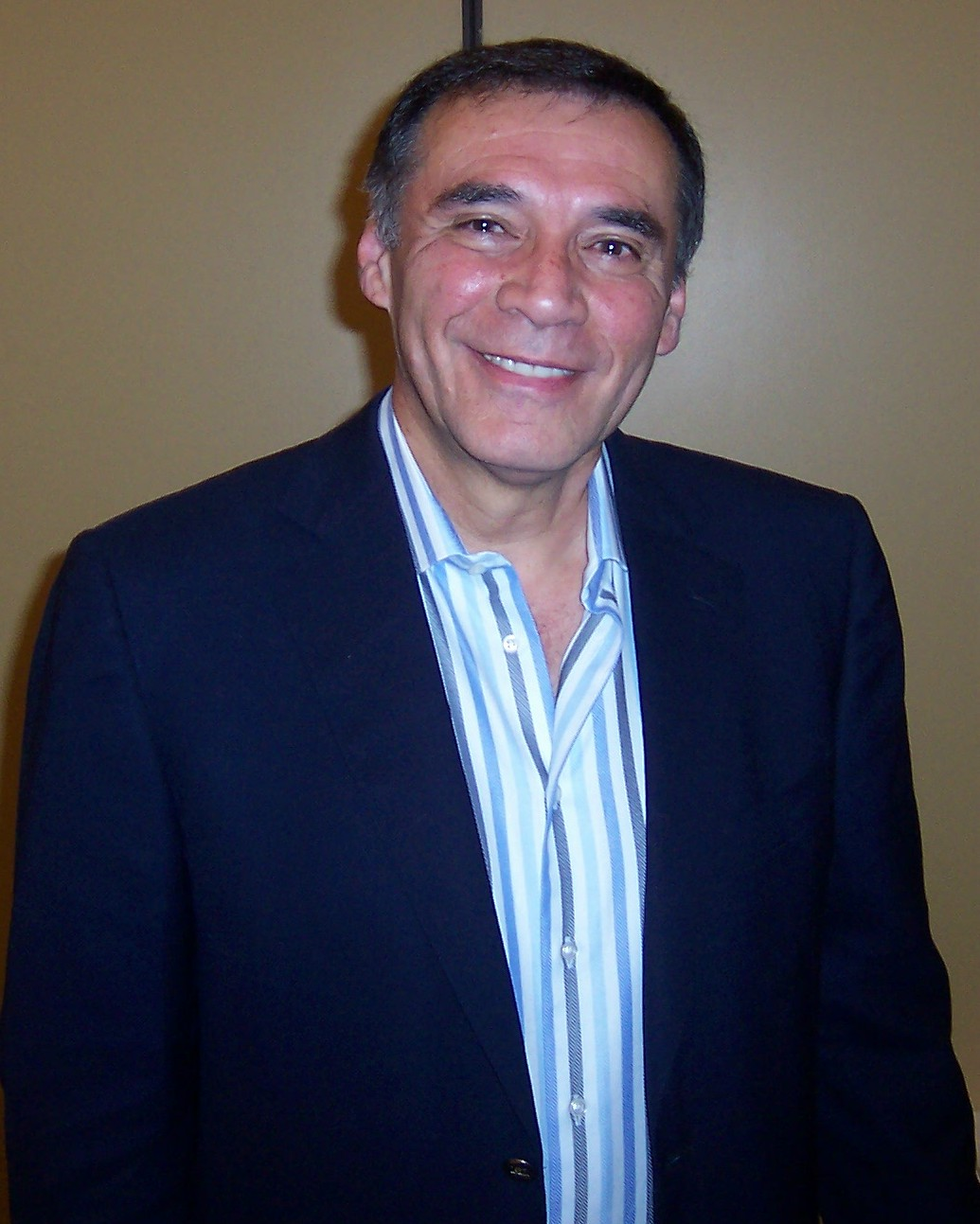
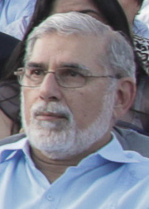
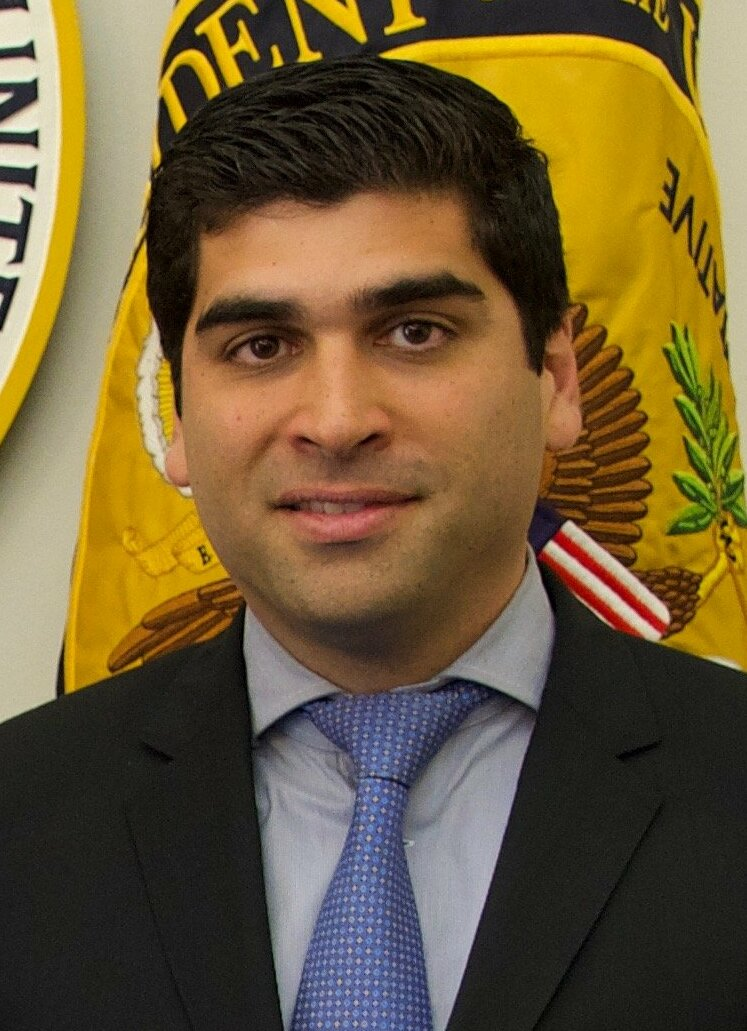
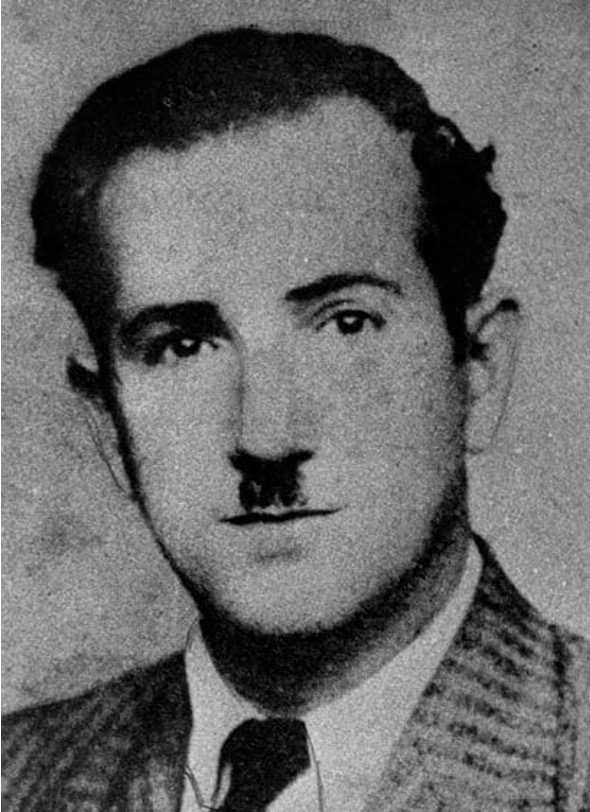
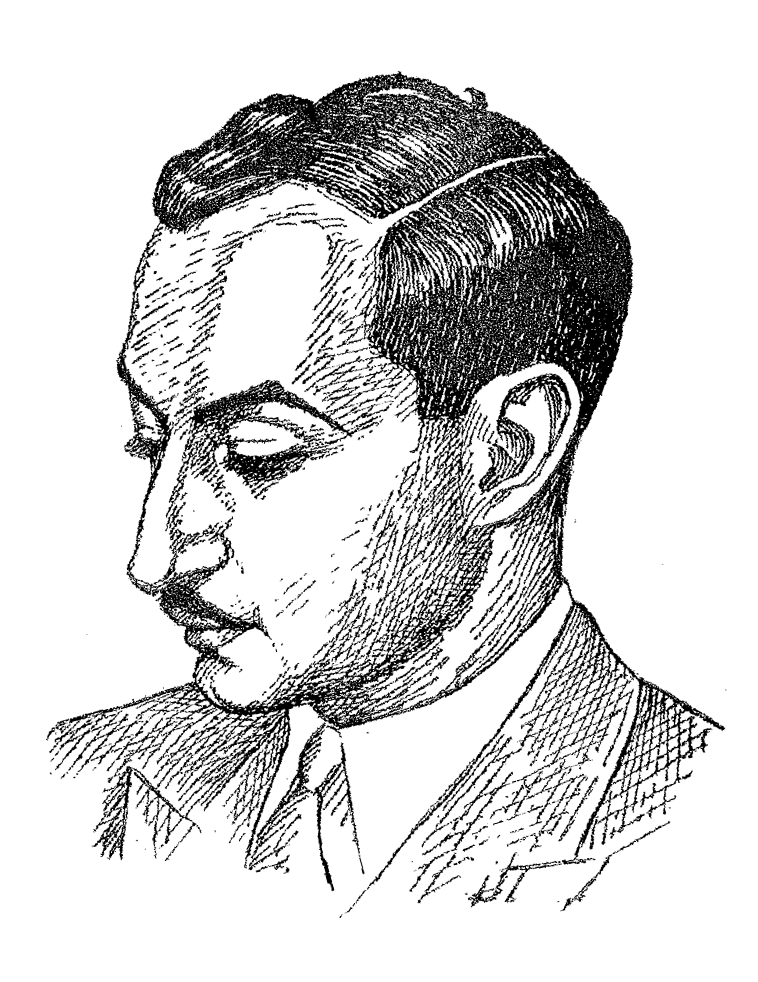
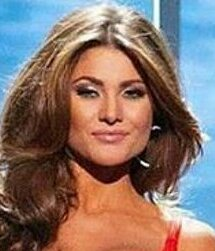
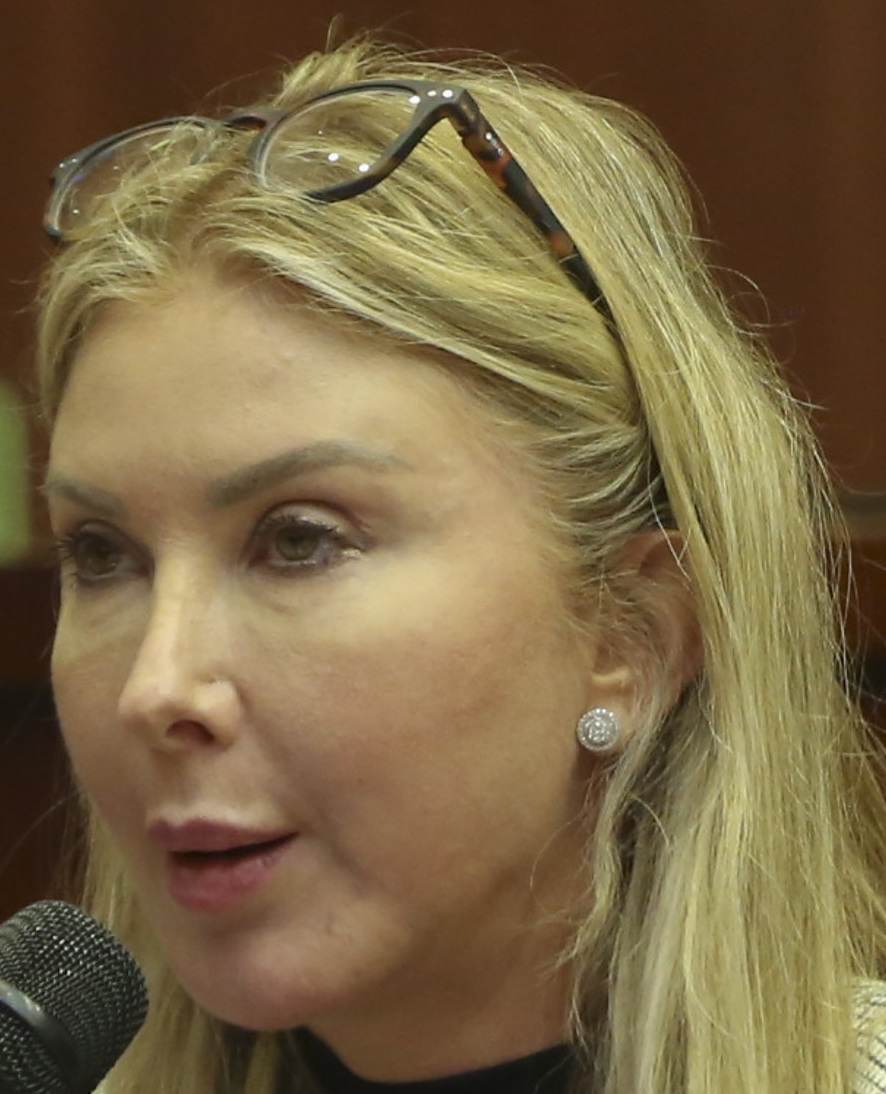
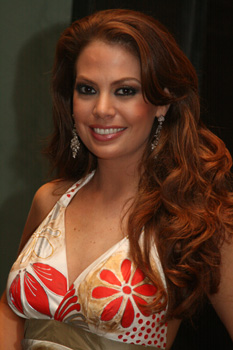
Lebanese Ecuadorians (Lebanon) (Ecuador): Abdalá Bucaram / Jamil Mahuad / Alberto Dahik; Otto Sonnenholzner / Nicasio Safadi / Jorge Enrique Adoum; Constanza Báez / Soledad Diab / Valeska Saab
Total population
- 250,000

Regions with significant populations
- Guayaquil and Quito

Languages
- Ecuadorian Spanish, Arabic

Religion
- Predominantly Christian Catholic.

Related ethnic groups
- Lebanese diaspora, Arab diaspora

Lebanese Ecuadorians are Ecuadorians who are descended from migrants from Lebanon or Lebanese who migrated to Ecuador and became Ecuadorian citizens. There are approximately up to 250,000 Lebanese people and their descendants living in Ecuador.

== Migration history ==
The first Levantine immigrants to Ecuador arrived around 1850 and larger numbers reached there in the 1880s and 1890s, nearly all of them Christians. Since 1875, there has been a constant flow of Lebanese immigrants to Ecuador, first fleeing the Ottoman Empire, and then the aftermath of World War I and II. By 1986, there were 97,500 Lebanese immigrants in Ecuador.

Early impoverished migrants tended to work as independent sidewalk vendors, but over time created a prominent presence within Ecuadorian society. The majority of Lebanese who migrated to Ecuador have become some of the country’s most well known business leaders and other known public figures. During Ecuador’s cocoa (chocolate) export boom of the late 19th and early 20th centuries, “Lebanese” began to immigrate to Guayaquil and quickly became merchants and traders. Some of the most successful business families in Ecuador are of “Lebanese” descent. They have made a lasting impact on Ecuadorian society in many aspects. Though they emigrated to escape Ottoman Turkish oppression, they were called "Turks" by Ecuadorians because they carried Ottoman passports.

== Demography ==
The number of Lebanese descendants in Ecuador is not too clear and varies. A 1982 estimate from Lebanon's Ministry of Foreign Affairs stated 20,000, while another private estimate from 1986 put it as high as 97,500. As of recent years, the growing community has undoubtedly exceeded these numbers with private estimates putting it as high as 250,000. They mainly reside mostly in Quito and Guayaquil as well as Manta. They are predominantly of the Christian and Catholic faiths; however, Ecuador is also home to a small Muslim community.

== Notable people ==
People of Lebanese background are very well represented in business and politics of the country. Some of them have reached the presidency and vice-presidency of Ecuador. Their prominence in politics provoked some backlash, with one politician warning of the "Bedouinization" of Ecuador.

- Julio Teodoro Salem was President for a short interim period in May 1944 before election of José María Velasco Ibarra.
- Abdalá Bucaram was elected President from August 10, 1996 to February 6, 1997. However he was highly unpopular and Parliament dismissed him because of "mental disability". He was accused also of embezzlement of public funds and replaced by Rosalía Arteaga.
- Yet a third President of the Republic was Jamil Mahuad. He served from August 10, 1998 to January 21, 2000 when he was forced to resign after a week of demonstrations by indigenous Ecuadorians and a military revolt led by Lucio Gutiérrez.
- Alberto Dahik, a Finance Minister and member of the Ecuadoran. He was a running mate of Sixto Durán Ballén and upon victory in the elections, served Vice Presidency to Sixto Durán Ballén for period 1992 to 1995.
- Jaime Nebot, was Mayor of Guayaquil from August 10, 2000 to May 14, 2019.
- Debbie Mucarsel-Powell, born in Ecuador, is an American politician.

== See also ==
- Lebanese diaspora
- Ethnic groups in Ecuador

== Bibliography ==
- Almeida, Mónica (1997), "Los sirio-libaneses en el espacio social ecuatoriano : cohesión étnica y asimilación cultural", Journal de la Société des Américanistes, 83 (83): 201–227, doi:10.3406/jsa.1997.1677
- Roberts, Lois J. (2000), The Lebanese immigrants in Ecuador: a history of emerging leadership, Westview Press, ISBN 978-0-8133-3718-0
