= Mery Zamora =

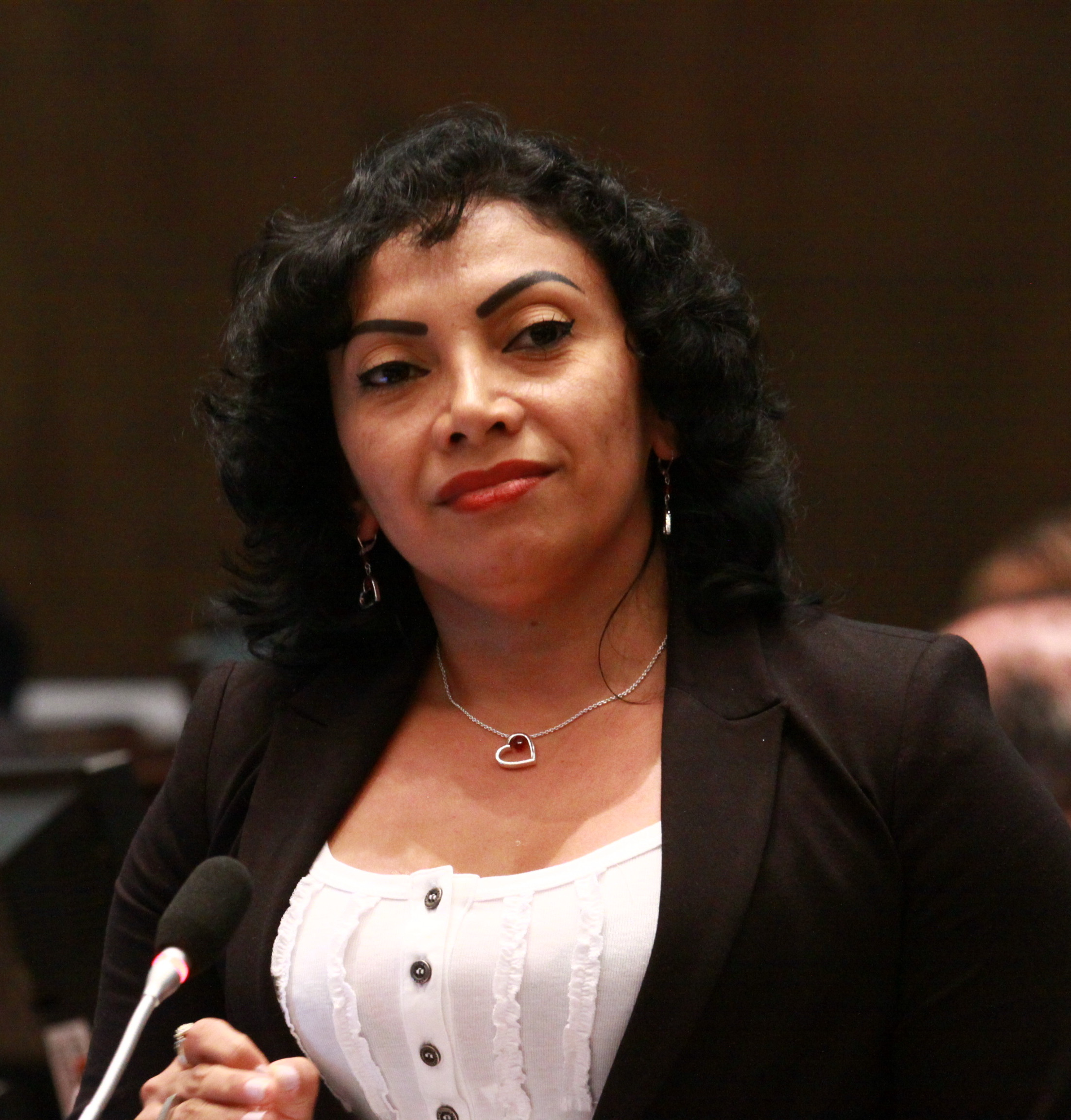
- Born: Mery Segunda Zamora García; April 19, 1972 (age 54); Portoviejo, Ecuador
- Education: Instituto Normal Superior 23 de Octubre
- Occupations: Teacher, politician, union leader
- Organization: National Union of Educators
- Political party: Democratic People's Movement (until 2014); Popular Unity (2014–present)

Signature
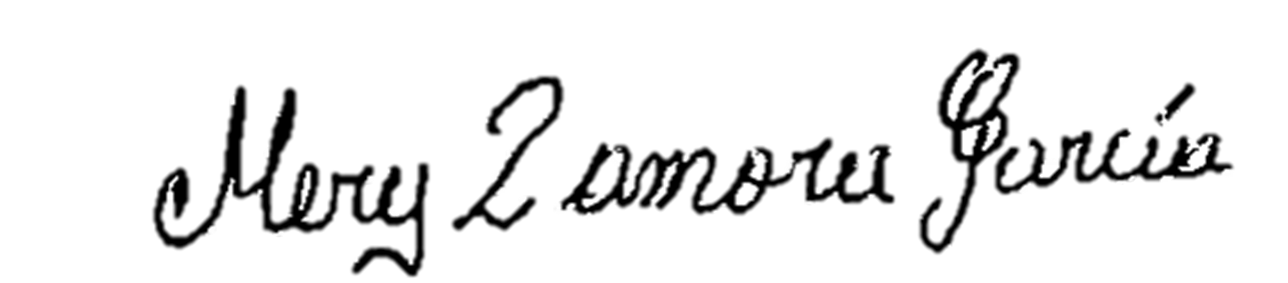

Mery Segunda Zamora García (born April 19, 1972) is an Ecuadorian trade unionist, teacher, and politician. She was president of the National Union of Educators (UNE) from 2007 to 2010, a term which coincided with the beginning of the government of Rafael Correa. She became a prominent critic of this regime, and was a frequent target of verbal abuse on Correa's Citizen Link broadcasts, culminating with an accusation of terrorism and sabotage in 2010. Legal proceedings against her were eventually dropped after a successful appeal.

Since 2014 she has been the first deputy director of the Popular Unity party.

== Biography ==
Mery Zamora was born in Portoviejo on April 19, 1972. She completed her primary studies at the Escuela Fiscal Mixta Amalia Zevallos No. 14, and secondary education at the Colegio Nacional Mixto 18 De Octubre and Colegio 23 de Octubre. At the Instituto Normal Superior 23 de Octubre she obtained the title of teacher in Basic Education.

== Trade union activity ==
During her time at school, Zamora was a student leader, becoming president of the student council of the Colegio 18 De Octubre in 1987, and president of the student council of the Colegio 23 de Octubre in 1990.

In 1995, she was the founder and president of the Frente de Lucha por el Ingreso al Magisterio (FLIM). She joined the Confederation of Women for Change in 1996. She was the provincial deputy director of the Frente Político Vanguardia del Magisterio in 2000, communications secretary of the UNE in Manabí Province from 2000 to 2004, and served as that organization's provincial president from 2004 to 2007. In 2007 she became UNE's national president.

== Political activity ==
As president of the UNE, one of the country's largest unions, Zamora initiated opposition to educational measures of the Rafael Correa government, among which was the evaluation of teachers. This drew Correa's ire, and she became the third most verbally assaulted woman on his Citizen Link broadcasts, after Lourdes Tibán and Cynthia Viteri.

Following the events of September 30, 2010, she was accused of terrorism and sabotage after a cell phone video allegedly showing her inciting a group of students to violence in Guayaquil was presented on Citizen Link. Zamora responded that she had been asking students to disperse, and that the recording only included a short fragment of audio which was taken out of context. On June 12, 2013, the 10th Criminal Guaranties Court of Guayas declared Zamora guilty of the crime, but on May 27, 2014, her appeal was accepted by three judges of the National Court of Justice, two of whom were subsequently dismissed from their positions, and one resigned. On February 10, 2015, the case against Zamora ended.

Within the Democratic People's Movement (MPD), she was the alternate of assemblyman Jorge Escala from 2008 to 2013, appearing in the National Assembly on some occasions. In August 2011, while still facing the criminal proceedings against her in Guayaquil, she was elected provincial director of the MPD in Manabí. That October she became its first deputy director. In the 2014 elections she ran for the mayoralty of Portoviejo, obtaining fourth place on the CREO Movement candidacy.

On September 27, 2014, Zamora was appointed first deputy director of Popular Unity, which emerged after the dissolution of the MPD. In the 2017 election she was the party's candidate for the National Assembly for the southern district of Manabí, but did not win a seat. On February 22, she and candidates from four other parties requested a recount due to numerical inconsistencies.
