= Saroj Sajan Shrestha =

Nepali singer (born 20th century

Saroj Sajan Shrestha सरोज साजन श्रेष्ठ (Nepali)
- Also known as: Saroj Kumar Shrestha
- Born: 27 December; Parbat District, Nepal
- Genre: Lok fusion
- Occupation: Singer
- Years active: 2013 – present

Saroj Sajan Shrestha (Nepali : सरोज साजन श्रेष्ठ; born 27 December in Nepal), also known as Saroj Kumar Shrestha, is a Nepalese Lok fusion singer.

== Biography ==
Shrestha started his musical career in 2013. "Mahasus garera hera" is the first song in his musical career. "Chhal Chhal", "Maya Nayani Taal (Nametine Pirati)", "Testai Testai Ma", are some popular songs of his musical career.

He has been awarded by the JCI Nepal. Shrestha received the "Outstanding Youth Award 2024" was by the Honorable Prime Minister of Nepal K.P. Sharma Oli

== Songs ==
SN	Song name	Year	Ref.
7	"Ramailo Phalewaas"	2018	
6	"Maya Nayani Taal"	2020	
5	"Testai Testai Ma"	2020	
2	"Chhal Chhal"	2021	
1	"Chumda Mayale"	2023	
3	"Mayalu Ko Desh"		
4	"Papini"		

== Awards ==
SN	Award title	Award category	Notable work	Result	Ref.
1	Birat Music & Film Award – 2023	Best Singer – Lok Pop (Male)	Song: Chhal Chhal	Won	
2	The Outstanding Youth of Nation (TOYN) – 2024	Music & Literature	One decade contribution in the field of Music and Literature for Society and Nation.	won	
