= 2017 Ecuadorian general election =

- 19 February 2017 (first round); 2 April 2017 (second round)
- Presidential election
- Registered: 12,816,698
- Turnout: 81.65% (first round); 82.98% (second round)
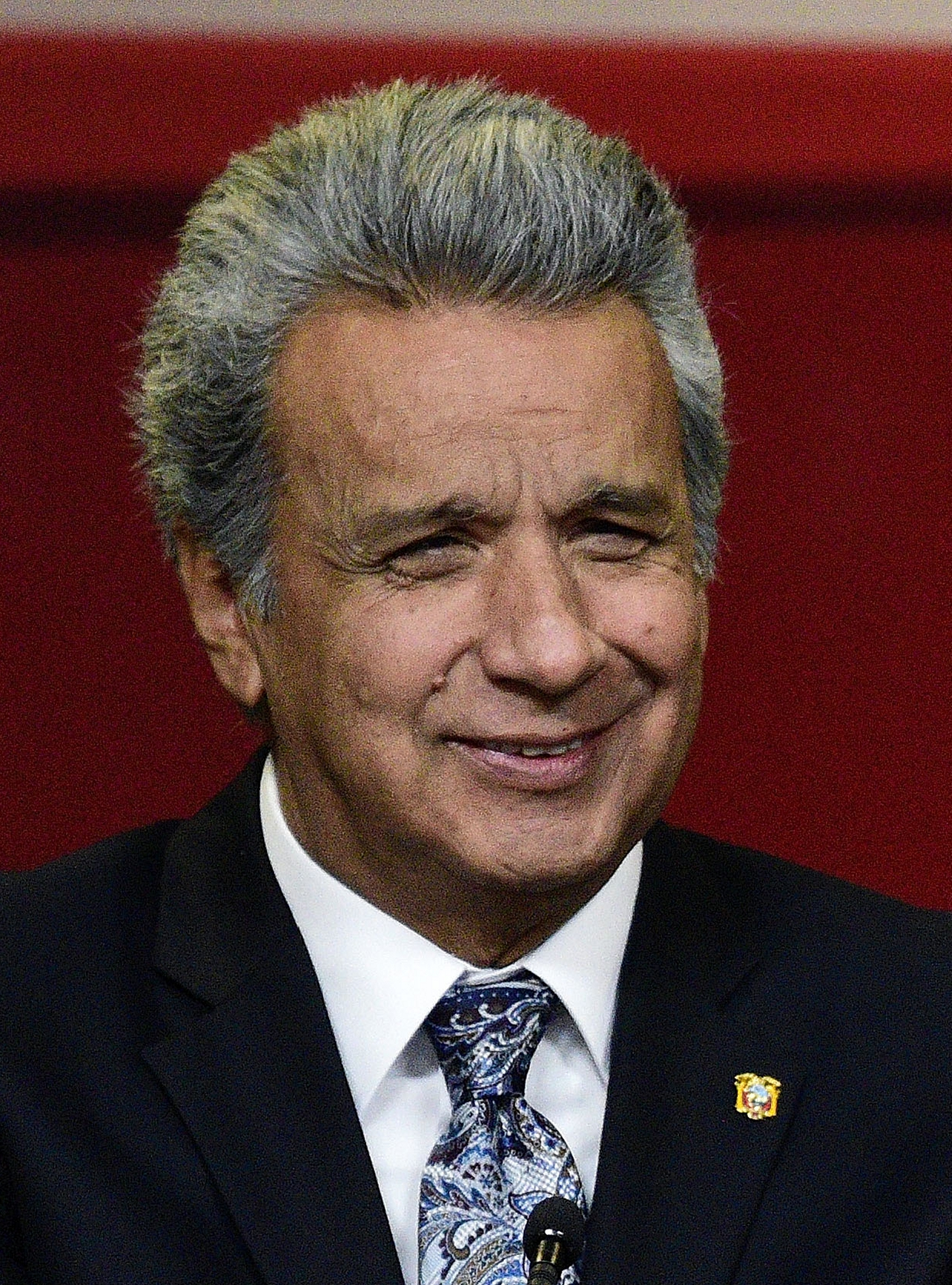

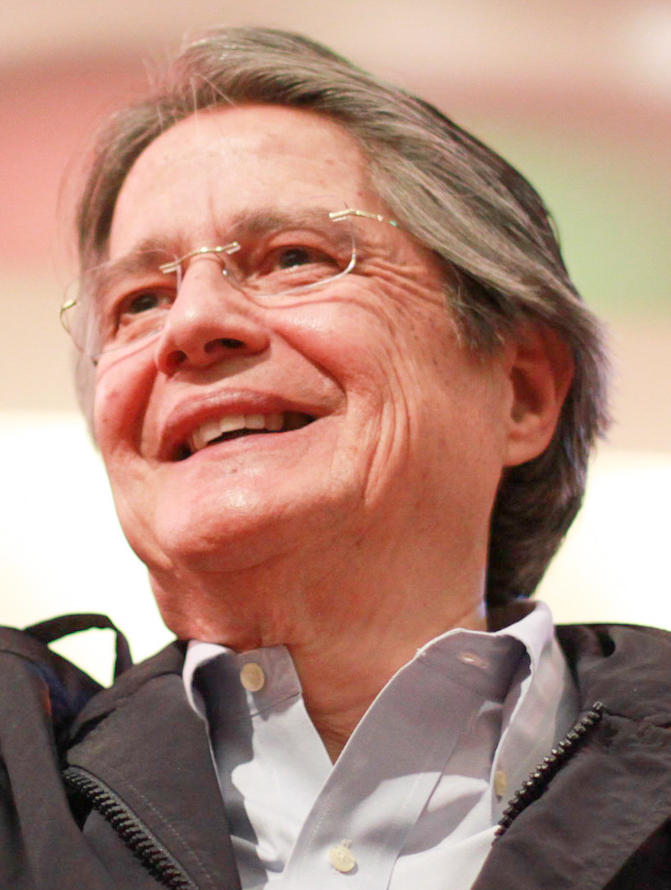
Nominee	Lenín Moreno	Guillermo Lasso
Party	PAIS Alliance	CREO
Alliance	United Front	Alliance for Change
Running mate	Jorge Glas	Andrés Páez
Popular vote	5,062,018	4,833,389
Percentage	51.16%	48.84%
- Lenín Moreno Guillermo Lasso
President before election
Rafael Correa
PAIS Alliance
Elected President
Lenin Moreno
PAIS Alliance
- Parliamentary election
- All 137 seats in the National Assembly; 69 seats needed for a majority
Party	Leader	Vote %	Seats	+/–
PAIS Alliance	Pierina Correa	39.07	74	−36
CREO	Salvador Quishpe	20.06	34	+24
PSC	Wilma Andrade	15.90	15	+7
ID	Henry Kronfle	3.77	4	New
Pachakutik	César Monge	2.67	4	−1
PSP	Fernando Villavicencio	2.94	2	−3
Fuerza Ecuador	Rocío Juca	4.75	2	+1
Avanza	Javier Orti	2.15	0	−5
Local lists	–		3	0
This lists parties that won seats. See the complete results below.
National Assembly President before	National Assembly President after
Gabriela Rivadeneira; PAIS Alliance	José Serrano; PAIS Alliance

General elections were held in Ecuador on 19 February 2017 alongside a referendum on tax havens. Voters elected a new President and National Assembly. Incumbent President Rafael Correa of the PAIS Alliance was not eligible for re-election, having served three terms. In the first round of the presidential elections, PAIS Alliance candidate Lenín Moreno received 39% of the vote. Although he was more than 10% ahead of his nearest rival, Guillermo Lasso of the Creating Opportunities party, Moreno was just short of the 40% threshold required to avoid a run-off. As a result, a second round was held on 2 April. In the second round Moreno was elected president with 51.16% of the vote.

== Background ==
Following nearly a decade of political volatility in Ecuador that was characterized by impeachments, economic crises, and public unrest, Rafael Correa, the nation's previous president, began his ascendance to power. During his 2006 campaign Correa established the PAIS Alliance, a coalition of leftist organizations that is the same party of current president Lenin Moreno. Lenin Moreno previously served as Correa's vice president.

Throughout his campaign and during his presidency Correa mobilized populist rhetoric to gain support, framing himself in opposition to the former political elite and current economic elite: Correa used the terms “neoliberal night” (“noche neoliberal”) and “particracy” (“partidocracia”) to refer to those groups, respectively, and characterized his own movement as a “citizen's revolution” (La revolucion ciudadana). Correa's success was part of a larger wave of leftist movements in Latin American that began around the turn of century, frequently referred to as the “pink tide.” Other countries that elected left-leaning presidents in the early 2000s include Argentina (Néstor Kirchner), Venezuela (Hugo Chávez), and Brazil (Luiz Inácio Lula da Silva), among others.

One of the most significant events that took place during Correa's time in office was the ratification of a new constitution in 2008. Correa advocated for the new constitution and his supporters welcomed it, citing a focus on civil rights and social programs for the impoverished. However, the constitution was also met with much opposition, as its detractors feared that the document would give too much economic authority to the executive and initially believed its elimination of term limits would benefit Correa himself, although a provision on the amendment assured the law would not be put into action until after his presidency had ended.

Guillermo Lasso, a former banker, initially ran for president in 2013, but lost to Correa by more than 30% of the vote in the first round. In both his first and second bids for president, Lasso was aligned with the Creating Opportunities Party (Creando Oportunidades), a conservative-leaning party that formed in 2012 and focused on celebrating the market, eliminating taxes, as well as advocating for an independent judiciary and free speech.

With Correa ineligible for re-election, his supporters formed an organisation Rafael Contigo Siempre (Always with you Rafael) to campaign for a constitutional amendment to allow him to run again. With signatures from 8% of the electorate required to hold a referendum (929,062), a total of 1.2 million were collected. However, Correa stated that he was planning on retiring from politics and would not run again. Instead, on 2 October 2016 the PAIS Alliance nominated Lenín Moreno, Correa's vice president from 2007 to 2013, as its candidate, with incumbent vice president Jorge Glas as his running mate. Moreno was challenged by Guillermo Lasso, a former banker.

== Campaign ==
A central issue in the presidential election was corruption; scandals in the Petroecuador state oil company and Odebrecht cases led to demands that candidates develop substantive plans to deal with corruption. Moreno proposed an anti-corruption law, while Lasso proposed a Truth Commission, which would be created with assistance from the United Nations.

The two main candidates had very different visions for the country; Moreno's policy ideas were fairly similar to Correa's, while Lasso said he wanted to attack corruption and lower taxes.

Lasso said before the elections that he would not allow Julian Assange to continue living in the Ecuadorian embassy in London.

== Electoral system ==
The President was elected using a modified two-round system, with a candidate required to get over 50% of the vote, or get over 40% of the vote and be 10% ahead of their nearest rival to be elected in the first round. The President is limited to two consecutive four-year terms.

The 137 members of the National Assembly were elected by three methods : 15 were elected from a nationwide constituency, 116 were elected in 31 districts (21 corresponding to the 21 smallest provinces and 10 within the 3 largest provinces, range 2-6 seats per district), and six elected from three two-member constituencies representing Ecuadorians living overseas. Elections are by open list proportional representation (every voter can vote for as many candidates as there are seats to be awarded), with the 15 national seats allocated using the Webster method and the rest using the d'Hondt method. Voting was compulsory except for voters aged 16–18 or over 65 and people classed as illiterate. Members of the National Assembly are limited to two four-year terms, either consecutive or not. There are gender quotas for the party lists, meaning there is alternation between men and women. There are no quotas for minority representation.

Parties have to receive at least 5% of the vote in national elections in order to maintain their legal registration.

== Opinion polls ==
=== Second round ===
2017

Date	Institute	Lenín Moreno	Guillermo Lasso
22/03/17	Eureknow	44.3%	41.3%
22/03/17	DIAGNOSTICO	48.73%	37.07%
21/03/17	Perfiles de Opinión	49.37%	36.35%
21/03/17	CEDATOS	52.4%	47.6%
21/03/17	Market	52.1%	47.9%
19/03/17	CMS	36,76%	35,86%
16/03/17	DIAGNOSTICO	50.61%	36.72%
15/03/17	CEDATOS	49.2%	50.8%
14/03/17	Market	53.2%	46.8%
14/03/17	Perfiles de Opinión	51.02%	35.53%
12/03/17	Opinión Pública	46%	35%
09/03/17	DIAGNOSTICO	48.36%	35.70%
06/03/17	CMS	35.17%	35.01%
01/03/17	DIAGNOSTICO	50.39%	41.20%
25/02/17	CIS	59%	41%
25/02/17	CEDATOS	47.9%	52.1%

=== First round ===
2017

Date	Institute	Lenín Moreno	Guillermo Lasso	Cynthia Viteri	Paco Moncayo	Dalo Bucaram	Washington Pesántez	Iván Espinel	Patricio Zuquilanda
End of public opinion polling (08/02/17)
08/02/17	CMS	25.63%	15.18%	6.64%	5.52%	–	–	–	–
08/02/17	CIEES	43.3%	21.3%	12.6%	10.8%	6.6%	1.0%	3.9%	0.6%
08/02/17	Opinión Pública	34.2%	18.2%	13.7%	7.4%	3.6%	0.1%	2.5%	0.6%
08/02/17	CEDATOS	32.3%	21.5%	14%	7.7%	4.1%	0.5%	2.9%	0.6%
08/02/17	Perfiles de Opinión	35%	16%	14%	7%	4%	<2%	4%	<2%
08/02/17	Market	28.5%	18.3%	20.2%	11.5%	4.9%	0.9%	2.6%	1.0%
28/01/17	Informe Confidencial	26.5%	17.5%	18.5%	–	–	–	–	–
27/01/17	CMS	26.42%	15.51%	7.70%	5.97%	2.94%	<2%	<2%	<2%
23/01/17	CEDATOS	34.3%	22.9%	11.4%	8.0%	4.3%	0.5%	1.7%	0.3%
21/01/17	Market	28.17%	16.57%	17.98%	13.22%	4.78%	0.59%	1.53%	1.3%
19/01/17	Estrategia y Táctica	23.6%	15.8%	12.8%	16.9%	–	–	–	–
15/01/17	Opinión Pública	34%	18.2%	8.9%	6.0%	2.9%	0.2%	1.2%	0.1%
08/01/17	Perfiles de Opinión	35%	17%	14%	8%	4%	<3%	<3%	<3%

2016 – fourth quarter

Date	Institute	Lenín Moreno	Guillermo Lasso	Cynthia Viteri	Paco Moncayo	Dalo Bucaram	Washington Pesántez	Iván Espinel	Patricio Zuquilanda	Lucio Gutiérrez	Álvaro Noboa
29/12/16	CEDATOS	35.6%	22.3%	10.9%	6.9%	3.2%	0.3%	0.8%	0.4%	–	–
28/12/16	Market	28.6%	17.7%	19.3%	14.8%	4.0%	0.4%	0.9%	0.1%	–	–
19/12/16	CMS	24.63%	12.89%	7.27%	5.18%	–	–	–	–	–	–
19/12/16	Opinión Pública	35.9%	17.4%	7.5%	7.6%	1.7%	0.3%	0.4%	0.8%	–	–
15/12/16	Perfiles de Opinión	36.86%	15.23%	12.33%	4.8%	3.23%	0.60%	1.28%	0.08%	–	–
15/12/16	Market	31.3%	17.1%	17.4%	13.8%	3.5%	0.5%	1.2%	1.9%	–	–
02/12/16	CEDATOS	36.2%	22%	9.7%	7.3%	3%	0.5%	1%	–	1.7%	0%
01/12/16	Estrategia y Táctica	28.68%	18.11%	13.39%	14.03%	4%	–	–	–	–	–
28/11/16	Market	28.1%	18.0%	17.6%	9.5%	1.9%	0.1%	1.5%	0.3%	–	–
26/11/16	CMS	22.79%	11.22%	6.73%	5.22%	–	–	–	–	–	–
23/11/16	Opinión Pública	40%	16.1%	7.7%	6.5%	1.5%	0.1%	0.5%	–	–	–
19/11/16	CIEES	42%	15%	9%	9%	<3%	–	–	–	<3%	<3%
18/11/16	Perfiles de Opinión	43%	14%	10%	8%	2%	–	–	–	–	1%
01/11/16	CMS	26.11%	11.14%	5.23%	5.89%	–	–	–	–	–	–
28/10/16	CEDATOS	37%	20%	10%	7%	3%	1%	–	–	2%	1%
26/10/16	CIEES	44%	13%	6%	8%	–	–	–	–	–	–
25/10/16	Market	32.2%	14.30%	16.14%	13.70%	–	–	–	–	–	–
25/10/16	CMS	29.91%	11.63%	6%	7.83%	–	–	–	–	–	–
23/10/16	Merchandising	28%	12%	5%	6%	–	–	–	–	–	13%
23/10/16	Markconsult S.A.	24%	11.5%	9.1%	2%	9.3%	–	–	–	–	–
23/10/16	Market	33.1%	13.8%	17.5%	10.3%	2.0%	–	–	–	–	2.3%
16/10/16	Opinión Pública	38.1%	13.7%	6.2%	6.2%	0.8%	0.6%	–	–	–	1.6%
13/10/16	Perfiles de Opinión	48%	12%	9%	8%	2%	–	–	–	–	3%

2016 – third quarter

Date	Institute	Rafael Correa	Lenín Moreno	Jorge Glas	Guillermo Lasso	Cynthia Viteri	Paco Moncayo	Dalo Bucaram	Álvaro Noboa	Lucio Gutiérrez	Lourdes Tibán	Lenin Hurtado	Enrique Ayala Mora	Washington Pesántez	Jimmy Jairala	Paúl Carrasco	Jaime Nebot	Mauricio Rodas
30/09/16	Dialoga	–	31.7%	–	21.4%	11.5%	4.9%	4.5%	–	–	–	–	–	–	–	–	–	–
30/09/16	Dialoga	–	32.1%	–	22.4%	–	4.8%	4.9%	–	–	–	–	–	–	–	7.9%	–	–
28/09/16	Informe Confidencial	–	36%	–	18.8%	15.7%	2.1%	2.1%	–	–	–	–	–	–	–	–	–	–
28/09/16	Informe Confidencial	–	33.7%	–	21.1%	–	2.3%	2.9%	–	–	–	–	–	–	–	9.8%	–	–
16/09/16	Perfiles de Opinión	–	49.06%	–	15.55%	10.63%	2.27%	–	–	–	1.37%	–	–	–	–	2.25%	–	–
16/09/16	Perfiles de Opinión	–	–	30.41%	17.55%	14.77%	–	–	–	–	–	–	–	–	–	–	–	–
15/09/16	CEDATOS	–	35%	–	18%	8%	2%	2%	2%	2%	–	–	–	0.2%	–	–	–	–
12/09/16	Quantum	–	42%	–	15%	10%	4%	–	–	–	–	–	–	–	–	–	–	–
12/09/16	Quantum	–	–	17%	16%	10%	8%	–	–	–	–	–	–	–	–	–	–	–
12/09/16	Monitor	–	31.3%	–	23.4%	13.3%	4.1%	–	–	–	–	–	–	–	–	–	–	–
12/09/16	Monitor	–	–	26.9%	24.8%	13.3%	3.6%	–	–	–	–	–	–	–	–	–	–	–
10/09/16	Opinion Pública	–	44%	–	14%	4%	1%	1%	1%	–	1%	1%	–	–	4%	–	–	–
30/08/16	Perfiles de Opinión	–	54%	–	16%	8%	–	–	–	3%	–	–	–	–	–	–	–	–
30/08/16	Perfiles de Opinión	–	–	34%	19%	13%	–	–	–	3%	–	–	–	–	–	–	–	–
23/08/16	Monitor	–	–	23.4%	20.5%	17.3%	4.8%	–	–	–	–	–	–	–	–	–	–	–
23/08/16	Monitor	–	33%	–	19.5%	16.2%	4.4%	–	–	–	–	–	–	–	–	–	–	–
23/08/16	Monitor	25.8%	–	–	20.6%	17.5%	4.8%	–	–	–	–	–	–	–	–	–	–	–
03/08/16	Informe Confidencial	–	39.3%	–	12.5%	7.4%	–	0.9%	1.7%	1.6%	–	–	0.4%	–	–	–	–	–
03/08/16	Informe Confidencial	–	–	27.3%	13.6%	11.8%	–	1%	1.9%	2.2%	–	–	0.4%	–	–	–	–	–
22/07/16	CEDATOS	–	35%	–	22%	8%	–	2%	2%	2%	1%	1%	1%	0.1%	–	–	–	–
22/07/16	CEDATOS	28%	–	–	21%	8%	–	2%	2%	2%	1%	1%	1%	1%	–	–	–	–
22/07/16	CEDATOS	–	–	20%	24%	10%	–	3%	2%	2%	1%	1%	1%	0.1%	–	–	–	–
04/07/16	Perfiles de Opinion	–	43.5%	–	13.2%	15.5%	–	1.3%	4.2%	–	–	–	1.2%	0.2%	–	–	–	–
04/07/16	Perfiles de Opinion	–	–	25.5%	16.8%	17.4%	–	1.7%	4.8%	–	–	–	2.9%	0.8%	–	–	–	–
03/07/16	CEDATOS	–	–	25%	31%	1%	–	2%	2%	–	1%	0.2%	1%	0.1%	1%	–	–	–
03/07/16	CEDATOS	28%	–	–	27%	–	–	1%	–	–	–	–	–	–	–	0%	11%	–
03/07/16	CEDATOS	28%	–	–	28%	–	–	1%	–	1%	–	–	–	0%	–	–	–	6%
07/16	Opinion Pública	–	38%	–	17%	5%	2%	1%	–	–	–	1%	–	–	6%	–	–	–

2016 – second quarter

Date	Institute	Lenín Moreno	Jorge Glas	Guillermo Lasso	Jaime Nebot	Cynthia Viteri	Paco Moncayo	Álvaro Noboa	Dalo Bucaram	Washington Pesántez	Lourdes Tibán
29/06/16	CEDATOS	44%	–	26%	–	1%	–	–	1%	0.1%	1%
29/06/16	CEDATOS	–	25%	29%	–	1%	–	–	2%	0.3%	2%
29/06/16	CEDATOS	42%	–	23%	10%	–	–	–	1%	0%	1%
01/05/16	Perfiles de Opinión	50%	–	9%	15%	–	2%	2%	2%	1%	–
01/05/16	Perfiles de Opinión	–	25%	14%	20%	–	4%	3%	1%	1%	–

2016 – first quarter

Date	Institute	Rafael Correa	Jorge Glas	Lenín Moreno	Guillermo Lasso	Jaime Nebot	Mauricio Rodas	Dalo Bucaram	Ramiro González	Cynthia Viteri	Alberto Dahik	Carlos Pérez	Lucio Gutiérrez	Álvaro Noboa	Lenin Hurtado	Paúl Carrasco
21/02/16	Opinion Pública	–	–	34%	10%	10%	–	1%	1%	–	–	–	2%	1%	1%	–
17/02/16	CEDATOS	–	19%	–	40%	–	–	4%	–	4%	1%	0%	–	–	–	–
17/02/16	CEDATOS	34%	–	–	26%	13%	–	1%	–	–	–	–	–	–	–	0%
17/02/16	CEDATOS	36%	–	–	27%	–	8%	7%	–	–	–	–	1%	–	–	–
10/01/16	Perfiles de Opinión	–	29.8%	–	20.8%	–	14.4%	3.3%	1.9%	–	–	–	–	–	–	–
10/01/16	Perfiles de Opinión	–	28.5%	–	16.1%	23.9%	–	2.8%	2.4%	–	–	–	–	–	–	–

2015

Date	Institute	Rafael Correa	Lenín Moreno	Guillermo Lasso	Mauricio Rodas	Jaime Nebot	Lucio Gutiérrez	Alberto Acosta	Paúl Carrasco	Ramiro González	Álvaro Noboa
21/12/15	Perfiles de Opinión	–	58%	9%	–	16%	–	–	–	1%	–
21/12/15	Perfiles de Opinión	–	60%	13%	7%	–	–	–	–	1%	–
11/12/15	Opinion Pública	–	35%	10%	6%	6%	1%	0.4%	–	2%	0.4%
03/10/15	Opinion Pública	37%	–	12%	10%	6%	2%	–	–	1%	–
06/08/15	Opinion Pública	34%	–	11%	9%	4%	2%	–	1%	–	–
13/07/15	CEDATOS	40.4%	–	24%	12.3%	8.1%	–	–	–	–	–

2014

Date	Institute	Rafael Correa	Guillermo Lasso	Mauricio Rodas	Lucio Gutiérrez	Alberto Acosta	Álvaro Noboa	Norman Wray	Nelson Zavala	Jorge Glas	Lenín Moreno	Jaime Nebot	Isabel Noboa	Ramiro González	Vinicio Alvarado
19/06/14	CEDATOS	50%	16.7%	11.1%	1.2%	0.5%	1.4%	0.3%	0.3%	–	–	–	–	–	–
19/06/14	CEDATOS	–	22.6%	15.6%	2.1%	0.7%	–	–	–	17.6%	13.3%	6.2%	0.6%	0.6%	0.3%

2013

Date	Institute	Rafael Correa	Guillermo Lasso	Mauricio Rodas	Lucio Gutiérrez	Alberto Acosta	Álvaro Noboa	Norman Wray	Nelson Zavala	Jorge Glas
10/12/13	CEDATOS	60%	22%	4%	1%	1%	1%	1%	0.1%	–
10/12/13	CEDATOS	–	31%	5%	1%	2%	1%	0.4%	0.1%	29%
13/10/13	CEDATOS	56%	24%	7%	1%	2%	1%	1%	1%	–
13/10/13	CEDATOS	–	31%	7%	2%	2%	1%	2%	1%	23%

== Results ==
=== President ===
The first-round count was delayed for four days, far longer than usual, raising suspicions from the Lasso camp. In past years, the first-round results were known on election day. Election officials blamed the delays on "numerical inconsistencies" in some ballots. Moreno maintained a consistent lead throughout the count. However, by the fourth day of counting, it was no longer mathematically possible for him to win an outright victory—setting the stage for the runoff.

A recount would have taken weeks and Lenin Moreno (usually referred to as just “Lenin”) challenged all the allegations of fraud. President Correa said that "the moral fraud committed by the right will not go unpunished." Moreno said he will represent those who voted and those who didn't, tweeting "Long live Ecuador! Welcome fighters of peace and of life” along with a picture of him immediately after winning the election. His opponent Lasso, however, encouraged the people to peacefully protest the election results. He tweeted: "Let's act in a peaceful but firm manner, we must go to the streets and say 'don't steal my vote' because we want a change in Ecuador."

The National Electoral Council announced on 13 April that it would recount all ballots contested by both parties, accounting to about 10% of the total vote. Moreno also led the vote after recount of some of the votes, increasing the number of votes obtained by 1,594.

Candidate	Running mate	Party	First round		Second round	
Candidate	Running mate	Party	Votes	%	Votes	%
Lenín Moreno	Jorge Glas	PAIS Alliance	3,716,343	39.36	5,062,018	51.16
Guillermo Lasso	Andrés Páez	Alliance for Change (CREO–SUMA)	2,652,403	28.09	4,833,389	48.84
Cynthia Viteri	Mauricio Pozo Crespo	Social Christian Party	1,540,903	16.32		
Paco Moncayo	Monserratt Bustamante	National Agreement for Change	634,033	6.71		
Abdalá Bucaram Jr.	Ramiro Aguilar	Fuerza Ecuador	455,187	4.82		
Iván Espinel Molina	Doris Quiroz	Social Commitment Force	299,840	3.18		
Patricio Zuquilanda Duque	Johnnie Jorgge Álava	Patriotic Society Party	72,679	0.77		
Washington Pesántez	Álex Alcívar	Ecuadorian Union Movement	71,107	0.75		
Total			9,442,495	100.00	9,895,407	100.00
Valid votes			9,442,495	90.23	9,895,407	93.04
Invalid/blank votes			1,022,812	9.77	740,167	6.96
Total votes			10,465,307	100.00	10,635,574	100.00
Registered voters/turnout			12,816,698	81.65	12,816,698	82.98
Source: CNE

=== National Assembly ===
The National Assembly makes up the legislative branch of Ecuadorean government. These elected officials have the power to pass laws, while judges of the national court of justice are chosen by a separate judicial council.

Party	National			Provincial			Overseas			Total seats	+/–
Party	Votes	%	Seats	Votes	%	Seats	Votes	%	Seats	Total seats	+/–
PAIS Alliance	3,184,004	39.07	7	3,061,618	36.54	63	47,344	44.45	4	74	–36
Alliance for Change (CREO–SUMA)	1,634,786	20.06	3	1,654,318	19.74	29	20,548	19.29	2	34	+24
Social Christian Party	1,295,768	15.90	3	1,251,923	14.94	12	22,240	20.88	0	15	+7
Fuerza Ecuador	387,100	4.75	1	344,468	4.11	0	396	0.37	0	1	0
Democratic Left	307,235	3.77	1	348,919	4.16	3	2,628	2.47	0	4	New
Patriotic Society Party	239,594	2.94	0	186,354	2.22	2	1,355	1.27	0	2	–3
Pachakutik Plurinational Unity Movement	217,591	2.67	0	216,523	2.58	4	776	0.73	0	4	–1
Advance	175,213	2.15	0	223,339	2.67	0	2,685	2.52	0	0	–5
Social Commitment Force	159,259	1.95	0	128,767	1.54	0	1,509	1.42	0	0	New
Popular Unity	130,391	1.60	0	226,369	2.70	0	857	0.80	0	0	0
Forward Ecuadorian. Forward Party	106,758	1.31	0	133,351	1.59	0	1,866	1.75	0	0	0
Democratic Centre	92,904	1.14	0	136,955	1.63	0	1,285	1.21	0	0	New
Coalition Movement	82,309	1.01	0	63,913	0.76	0				0	0
Ecuadorian Socialist Party	70,085	0.86	0	120,796	1.44	0	1,236	1.16	0	0	0
Ecuadorian Union Movement	66,489	0.82	0	71,917	0.86	0	1,778	1.67	0	0	New
Provincial movements (MSC/UpP/MPCG)				209,135	2.50	3				3	0
Total	8,149,486	100.00	15	8,378,665	100.00	116	106,503	100.00	6	137	0
Valid votes	8,149,486	77.79		8,378,665	80.99		106,503	79.94			
Invalid/blank votes	2,326,745	22.21		1,966,557	19.01		26,727	20.06			
Total votes	10,476,231	100.00		10,345,222	100.00		133,230	100.00			
Registered voters/turnout	12,816,698	81.74		12,436,606	83.18		378,292	35.22			
Source: El Telegrafo, CNE

=== Andean Parliament ===
Party	Votes	%	Seats
PAIS Alliance–Ecuadorian Socialist Party	13,394,755	36.98	3
Alliance for Change (CREO–SUMA)	6,853,777	18.92	1
Social Christian Party	6,080,202	16.79	1
National Agreement for Change	3,890,349	10.74	0
Fuerza Ecuador	1,866,345	5.15	0
Advance	934,235	2.58	0
Social Commitment Force	881,398	2.43	0
Patriotic Society Party	851,743	2.35	0
Democratic Center	533,881	1.47	0
Forward Ecuadorian, Forward	513,780	1.42	0
Coalition Movement	422,716	1.17	0
Total	36,223,181	100.00	5
Valid votes	8,243,160	78.68	
Invalid/blank votes	2,234,106	21.32	
Total votes	10,477,266	100.00	
Registered voters/turnout	12,816,698	81.75	
Source: CNE
