= Popular Unity (Ecuador) =

Political party in Ecuador

Popular Unity Unidad Popular
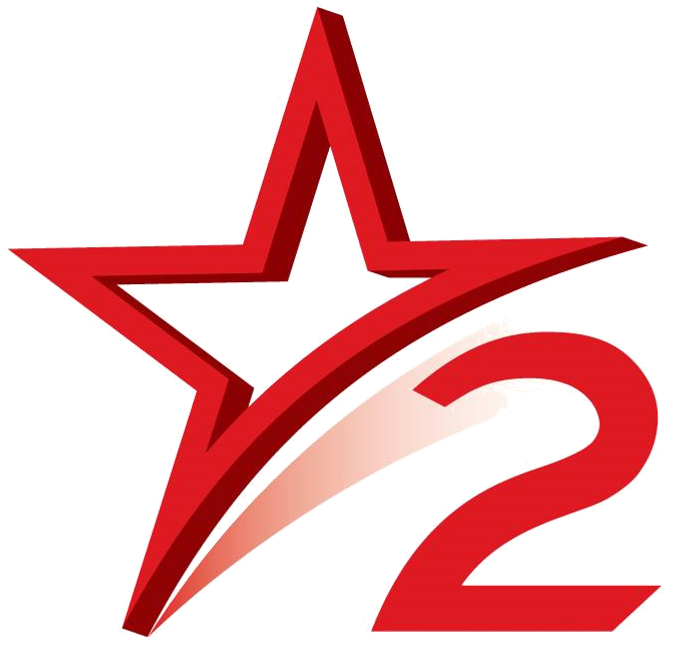
- Director: Geovanni Atarihuana
- Deputy Director: Mery Zamora
- Founded: September 27, 2014
- Preceded by: MPD
- Headquarters: Manuel Larrea and Jose Riofrio, Quito
- Membership: 199,945 (2016)
- Ideology: Communism; Marxism-Leninism; Revolutionary socialism Anti-imperialism
- Political position: Far-left
- National affiliation: PCMLE
- Colours: Red
- Seats in the National Assembly: 1 / 151
- Provincial Prefects: 1 / 23
- Mayors: 13 / 221

Website
- unidadpopulardos.com

The Popular Unity Movement (UP) (in Spanish: Movimiento Unidad Popular) is an Ecuadorian political movement of the revolutionary left close to Marxism-Leninism to be conformed with the electoral wing of the Marxist–Leninist Communist Party of Ecuador. The party is a member of the National Agreement for Change.

It arose after the CNE removed the Democratic People's Movement from its legal status after declaring the existence of poor electoral results on the part of this party. The members of the previous party formed Unidad Popular to replace the old MPD, in which they would continue their political work.

The party has a special stronghold in the province of Esmeraldas, where they held the provincial government from 2005 to 2019.

== Ideology ==
Its ideological principles are under a revolutionary and socialist character, considering the continuation of the struggle of the Democratic People's Movement and Jaime Hurtado. They oppose individualism and the relationship between countries based on imperialism, a system opposed by internationalism among the peoples they support.

They support the development of participatory democracy and the right to self-determination of peoples, supporting, like Pachakutik, the constitution of Ecuador as a plurinational and multicultural state. They also declare themselves environmentalists.

Within the movement are integrated different thoughts of the revolutionary left, taking the importance of the Marxism-Leninism of PCMLE, which is why it is defined as the electoral front of this organization.

== History ==
=== Background ===
The Democratic People's Movement was an organization founded by the militants of PCMLE, among them Jaime Hurtado, as well as other sectors of the left on March 17, 1978, at the premises of the Unique Trade Union of Drivers of Pichincha. The principles of this organization were summarized in its slogan: the "conquest of a popular, patriotic, democratic and revolutionary government that resolutely applies its program and lays the foundations for the conquest of socialism".

The MPD would be opposition of all governments since its founding, from Jaime Roldós to Gustavo Noboa, being present in the organization of strikes, which led to their obtaining the qualification of "tirapiedras" that in English means: stone shooter. In the case of Lucio Gutiérrez they maintained their support until 3 months after their promotion to the presidency. Later they would continue in opposition to Alfredo Palacio.

An alliance with this regime started during the government of Rafael Correa. However, in 2009, the critical position of the party before the policies of Alianza País led to the break. Since then, the MPD was strongly opposed to Correa's government considering him a "traitor of the left" while losing political space, which caused low results that finally led to the dissolution of the MPD in the National Electoral Council. However, the party considered it as a tactic to end the political work of the organization.

== Electoral results ==
=== National Assembly elections ===
Election	Leader	Votes	%	Seats	+/–
2017	Geovanni Atarihuana	130,391	1.60	0 / 137	New
2021	Geovanni Atarihuana	139,969	1.74	0 / 137	0
2023 (Note: Run as part of the Claro Que Se Puede coalition (UP, PSE and MDS).)	Geovanni Atarihuana	240,015	2.87	0 / 137	TBA
2025	Geovanni Atarihuana	156,796	1.72	1 / 151	▲1

=== President ===
Election	Candidates		First round		Second round		Status
Election	President	Vice President	Votes	%	Votes	%	Status
2017	—N/a	—N/a	—N/a	—N/a	—N/a	—N/a	Did not participate
2021	—N/a	—N/a	—N/a	—N/a	—N/a	—N/a	Did not participate
