= Time in Ecuador =

Mainland Ecuador follows UTC-5 and the Galapagos UTC-6

Ecuador Time (ECT), as named by the IANA time zone database, is the time observed in mainland Ecuador since 1931. Ecuador Time is at UTC-05:00 and has no daylight saving, except for a brief period from late 1992 to early 1993 during the government of president Sixto Durán Ballén. Galápagos Province observed Ecuador Time until 1986, when it switched to Galápagos Time (GALT), at UTC-06:00.
