= JCI Nepal =

Social organization

JCI Nepal (Nepal Jaycees)
- Abbreviation: Junior Chamber International Nepal (JCI Nepal)
- Formation: 1964
- Type: Social welfare
- Legal status: Non-Profit Organization and Auxiliary to Government in the humanitarian field
- Purpose: Community service
- Headquarters: Kathmandu, Nepal
- Region served: Nepal
- Founder President: JCI Sen. Dr.Bhesh Bahadur Thapa (Nepali: डा. भेखबहादुर थापा)
- National President 2026: JC Jiban Karki
- National Secretary General 2026: JC. Amar Ghimire
- Main organ: National Board of Director
- Affiliations: Junior Chamber International
- Website: jcinepal.org.np

Junior Chamber International NEPAL commonly referred to as JCI Nepal Nepal Jaycees (नेपाल जेसीज) is a non-profit international non-governmental organization of young people between 18 and 40 years old. It has members in about 124 countries, and regional or national organizations in most of them.is a voluntary organization; a membership-based NGO working in Nepal since 1964 for developing the leadership skills of young men and women of this country. JCI Nepal is organization of young active citizens age 18 to 40 working in Nepal since 1964 for developing the leadership, personality and entrepreneurship skills of young people of Nepal. Dr. Bhesh Bahadur Thapa is the founder President of JCI Nepal (नेपाल जेसीज).

They are engaged and committed to creating positive impact in our communities. JCI Nepal is one of the National Organizations of (JCI) Junior Chamber International. JCI is founded by Mr. Henry Giessenbier. JCI has 120+ national organizations, 5000+ local organizations and 200,000+ active members. JCI Nepal has 178 Local Chapters along with 15000 members. JCI Nepal gathers young active citizens from all sectors of society. They develop their skills, knowledge and understanding to make informed decisions and take action in our communities. JCI Nepal is the seventh-largest Member Nation of Junior Chamber International. Currently they are active in almost every parts of Nepal.

== Mission ==
To provide leadership development opportunities that empower young people to create positive change.

== Vision ==
To be the foremost global network of young leaders.

== History ==
JCI Nepal is organization of young active citizens age 18 to 40 working in Nepal since 1964 for developing the Leadership, Personality and Entrepreneurship skills of young people of Nepal. Dr Bhekh Bahadur Thapa is the founder President of JCI Nepal (नेपाल जेसीज).

== Organizational structure ==
JCI Nepal is headquartered in Thapathali, Kathmandu and it has chapters in many parts of the country. It consists of a National General Assembly, a National Board of Directors, a Local Organization Member Committee, and General Members. JCI Nepal Training School is a Training wing of JCI Nepal, which Provides various types of Training, Workshops to its leaders & General members. Present President of JCI Nepal for 2026 is JC Jiban Karki.
