= South African Teachers' Association =

Trade union in South Africa

The South African Teachers' Association (SATA) was a trade union representing white teachers in the Cape Province of South Africa.

SATA was founded in 1887, the first teachers' union to be established in South Africa. It grew slowly, and by 1926 had 2,400 members. It distanced itself from the broader trade union movement, seeing itself as a professional organisation, although it also devoted significant time to campaigning for higher pay and better conditions for its members. It avoided political activity, although after the Soweto uprising it gradually moved to oppose apartheid, and a minority of its members were involved in the progressive Education for an Aware South Africa group.

In 1997, the union merged with the Transvaal Teachers' Association and the Transvaal Association of Teachers, to form the National Union of Educators.
