= Abdalá Bucaram Jr. =

Ecuadorian footballer and politician

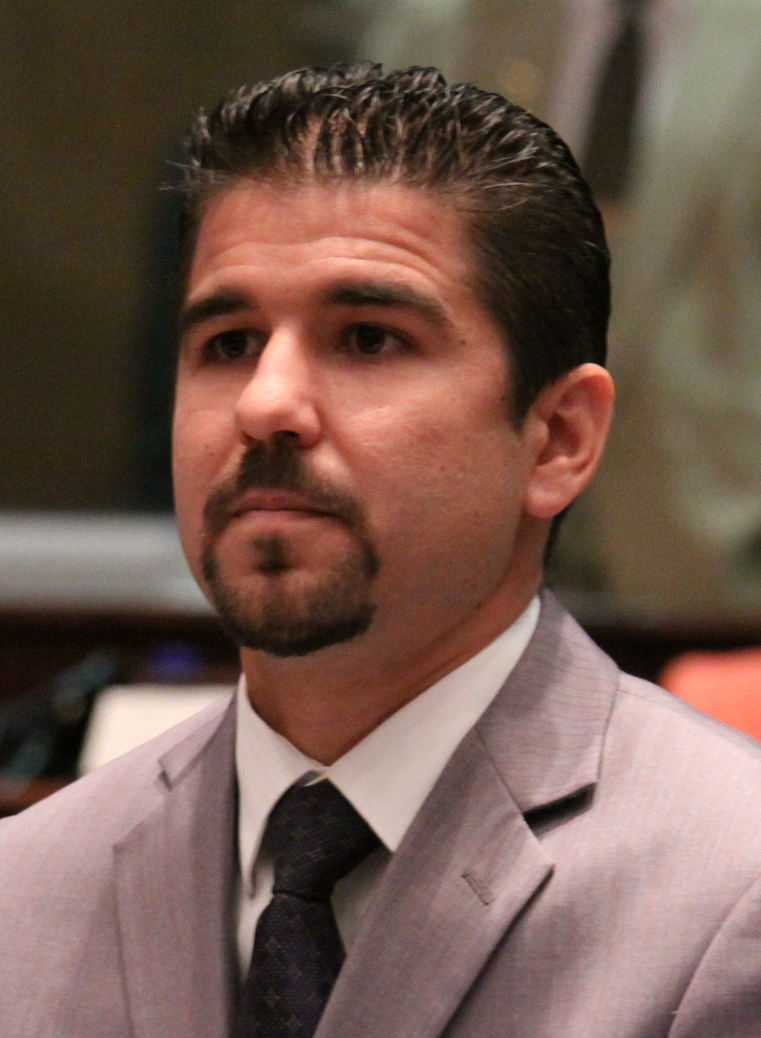
- Bucaram in 2010

Member of the National Assembly for the National Constituency
- In office 31 July 2009 – 1 December 2014

Personal details
- Born: Abdalá Jaime Bucaram Pulley; 25 March 1982 (age 44) Guayaquil, Ecuador
- Party: Fuerza Ecuador
- Other political affiliations: Ecuadorian Roldosist Party (until 2014)
- Spouse: Gabriela Pazmiño
- Occupation: Footballer (retired); football manager; politician
Association football career
- Height: 1.68 m (5 ft 6 in)
- Positions: Forward; attacking midfielder
Youth career
- 1996–2000: Emelec
Senior career*
Years	Team	Apps	(Gls)
2001	Santa Rita		
2002	Chacarita Juniors		
2002	Barcelona SC	13	(0)
2003	Emelec	8	(4)
2003	Alianza de Montevideo		
2004	Audaz Octubrino	21	(3)
2004	Santiago Morning		
2005	Unión San Felipe	2	(0)
2005	Santa Rita		
Total		85	(17)
International career
2001	Ecuador U20		
Managerial career
- 2023: 9 de Octubre (interim)
- 2024: 9 de Octubre
- * Club domestic league appearances and goals

Abdalá Jaime Bucaram Pulley Jr. (born 25 March 1982) is an Ecuadorian political figure and former footballer. He is the son of former President Abdalá Bucaram Ortiz.

After his retirement from professional football at age 24, he began his political career by being elected to office as an assemblyman with 428,000 votes in 2009 and in 2014 was re-elected with 500,000 votes.

On 1 December 2014, he announced his resignation from his position as National Assemblyman due to his strong convictions that the office he served did not serve the best interests of his constituents.

In 2017 he ran for the presidency of the republic with the support of his political party Fuerza Ecuador (FE), founded by him, he lost the election obtaining only 4.82% of the votes.

He was invited to the XIII Latin American Summit of Political Marketing and Governance, event that brings together the leading strategists and political consultants of the world.

== Early life ==
Abdala "Dalo" Bucaram was born in Guayaquil, Ecuador on 25 March 1982, son of Abdala Bucaram Ortiz and Maria Rosa Pulley Vergara. He is the third of four brothers: James, Linda and Michel.

He completed his high school education at the Moderna Sergio Perez Valdez College in Guayaquil.

As an athlete he was part of one of the two most renowned teams in the country, C.S. Emelec, where he began his football career. He also played with Barcelona S.C, Santa Rita and Otubrino Daring Nationally.

Internationally, he played for teams such as Chacarita Junior (Argentina) and the Alliance of Montevideo in the Uruguayan second division.

=== Family ===
Bucaram's father is Abdalá Bucaram Ortiz, a populist who was President of Ecuador from 10 August 1996, to 6 February 1997, when he was ousted by the Congress of Ecuador for alleged "mental incapacity".

=== Marriage and sons ===
He married in 2005 to TV host and assemblywoman Gabriela Pazmiño, with whom he has four children: Dalia, Maria Gabriela, Abdala and Charlotte.

=== Education ===
Bucaram studied law at the Metropolitan University of Ecuador. Later, he transferred to the Cooperative University of Colombia in Quito where he graduated with a degree in law from the courts of the Republic in 2008.

After graduating as a lawyer, Bucaram specialized in constitutional law at the Universidad de Salamanca of Spain in 2013. He continued his studies and pursued a master's degree in political management from George Washington University.

Bucaram also completed seminars at the University of Alicante, University of Salamanca, and George Washington University.

== Sport career ==
As a football player, his position was as a midfielder for several clubs in South America.

In 2001, he was selected for the U-20 national football team for Ecuador, but only played the opening match of the South American championship. After that match against Venezuela ended in a 0–0 score, manager José María Burbano resigned and Fabian Andrade took over as coach. Bucaram said a political conspiracy prevented him from being selected for any additional games during the tournament .

In 2003, while playing for Emelec, he participated in the Copa Libertadores. During the tournament, he played in two games .

== Political career ==
=== Ecuadorian Roldosista Party ===
PRE was a political party led by Bucaram's father Abdala Bucaram Ortiz, founded on 18 January 1983. The younger Bucaram was the provincial director of Guayas from 2006 to 2008, and national director of the party for six years from 2008 to 2013. Bucaram left the party, saying that he wanted to pursue his master's degree, spend more time with his family, and support new leadership in Guayas.

=== National Constituent Assembly ===
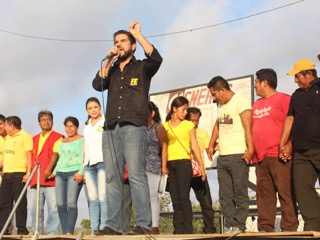
Pronunciamiento de Discurso político en el año 2015

==== 2009–2013 ====
Bucaram was first elected to the National Assembly with 428,000 votes for the Ecuadorian Roldosista Party. His wife, Gabriela Pazmiño, ran on the same party list as him, and was chosen as MP for the province of Guayas.

==== 2013–2017 ====
Bucaram and his wife sought reelection for a second period in the National Assembly, but only Bucaram was reelected with half a million votes, becoming the only Roldosist member in the Assembly.

However, at the beginning of the first debate of the report on a series of controversial amendments to the Constitution prepared by the Assembly, Bucaram announced his resignation under the argument that he was against the ultimately-approved changes promoted by the majority block of País Alliance. He also questioned the lack of consultation (via referendum) to the Ecuadorian populace: "they trample the rights of people by not consulting them in a referendum", he said. Additionally, he justified his decision on his conviction that the office he served did not serve the best interest of his constituents.

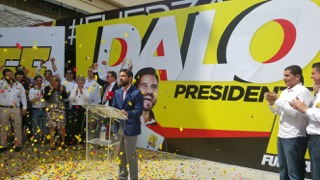
Lanzamiento a la Presidencia de la República del Ecuador (2016)

=== Presidential bid ===
On 10 September 2015 the National Electoral Council approved the political party Fuerza Ecuador, which has No. 10 as the electoral distinction. The party has about 600,000 members nationwide.

In December, at party headquarters in the north of Guayaquil, Bucaram announced his decision to run for the presidency in the 2017 elections, while unveiling the first proposal of his government plan: the elimination of a government-sponsored program for the replacement of gas kitchens with induction kitchens.

Despite being under the focus of criticism for his father's legacy, Bucaram has been clear that although he loves and respects his father, his philosophy and political views are his own and they differ from those of Bucaram Sr.

== Controversies ==
During his first period as an assemblyman (2009–2013), Bucaram was fined 10% of his monthly salary by the administrative board of the Assembly after being verbally aggressive towards fellow MP Betty Amores and other members of Alianza País.

Party political offices
Preceded by Abdalá Bucaram	Supreme Director of the Ecuadorian Roldosist Party; 2008-2014	Succeeded by Party disappear
Preceded by New creation	Supreme Director of Fuerza Ecuador; 2014-present	Incumbent
