= 2017 Ecuadorian tax haven referendum =

- 19 February 2017
- Do you agree that, in order to hold a position of popular election or to be a public servant, it is established as a prohibition to have assets or capital, of any nature, in tax havens?

Results
Choice	Votes	%
Yes	5,030,579	55.12%
No	4,096,559	44.88%
Valid votes	9,127,138	87.23%
Invalid or blank votes	1,336,496	12.77%
Total votes	10,463,634	100.00%
Registered voters/turnout	12,816,698	81.64%

A referendum on banning politicians and civil servants from having bank accounts or companies based in tax havens was held in Ecuador on 19 February 2017, alongside general elections. The proposal was approved by voters, giving officials one year to transfer their assets or be removed from their posts.

The question on the ballot was "Do you agree that, for those holding a popularly elected office or for public servants, there should be a prohibition on holding assets or capital, of any nature, in tax havens?"

== Classification of tax havens ==
In preparation for the referendum, the Ecuadorian Internal Revenue Service issued a resolution outlining the criteria for a jurisdiction to be considered a tax haven, establishing two categories: Preferential tax regimes, and low tax jurisdictions. A preferential tax regime was classed as a jurisdiction whose effective tax rate is below 60% in relation to the Ecuadorian corporate income tax (CIT) rate of 13.2%. A low tax jurisdiction was classed as having an effective tax rate below 60% in relation to the Ecuadorian CIT of 13.2% and no substantial economic activity. The IRS may remove a country from their list of tax havens if it reforms its tax policy, if it enforces a treaty to avoid double taxation, including a special information exchange clause, or if its laws do not include banking confidentiality, securities or other regulations that prohibit sharing information with the Ecuadorian IRS.

Along with this definition, the Ecuadorian IRS published a list of countries which currently meet the definition of a tax haven under their law. This list included 28 jurisdictions in the Americas, 19 in Oceania, 16 in Europe, 13 in Asia, 9 in Africa and two other island territories.

Africa
- Angola
- Cape Verde
- Djibouti
- Liberia
- Mauritius
- Nigeria
- Seychelles
- Swaziland
- Tunisia
Americas
- American Samoa
- Anguilla (Note: British Overseas Territory)
- Antigua and Barbuda
- Aruba (Note: Part of the Kingdom of the Netherlands)
- Bahamas
- Barbados
- Belize
- Bermuda
- Bonaire
- British Virgin Islands
- Cayman Islands
- Cocos Island (Costa Rica)
- Curacao
- Dominica
- Greenland
- Grenada
- Guyana
- Montserrat
- Panama
- Puerto Rico (Note: United States unincorporated territory)
- Saint Kitts and Nevis
- Saint Pierre and Miquelon (Note: Overseas Collectivity of France)
- Saint Vincent and the Grenadines
- Saint Martin
- Saint Helena
- Saint Lucia
- Trinidad and Tobago
- Turks and Caicos Islands
- United States Virgin Islands
Asia
- Bahrain
- Brunei Darussalam
- Jordan
- Kuwait
- Labuan (Malaysia)
- Macau
- Maldives
- Myanmar
- Oman
- Qeshm (Iran)
- Sri Lanka
- United Arab Emirates
- Yemen
Europe
- Albania
- Andorra
- Azores (Portugal)
- Campione d'Italia (Italy)
- Channel Islands (Note: British Dependency)
- Cyprus
- Gibraltar
- Isle of Man
- Liechtenstein
- Luxembourg
- Madeira (Portugal)
- Malta
- Monaco
- Ostrava Free Zone (Czech Republic)
- San Marino
- Svalbard (Norway)
- Trieste (Italy)
Oceania
- Christmas Island (Note: External Territory of Australia)
- Cook Islands (Note: Free Association with New Zealand)
- French Polynesia
- Guam
- Kiribati
- Marshall Islands
- Nauru
- Niue
- Norfolk Island (Australia)
- Palau (Note: Free Association with the United States)
- Pitcairn Islands
- Samoa
- Solomon Islands
- Tokelau (Note: Dependent territory of New Zealand)
- Tonga
- Tuvalu
- Vanuatu
Other
- Ascension Island
- Tristan da Cunha

== Campaign ==
Outgoing President Rafael Correa stated that he would campaign in favour of the proposal, having previously stated that tax havens were one of the biggest issues for democracy.

== Results ==
Choice	Votes	%
Yes	5,030,579	55.12
No	4,096,559	44.88
Invalid/blank votes	1,336,496	–
Total	10,472,302	100
Registered voters/turnout	12,816,698	81.64
Source: CNE
