= Patricio Izurieta Mora-Bowen =

Ecuadorian politician

Patricio Izurieta Mora-Bowen (born 13 October 1944) is an Ecuadorian entrepreneur. In 1980 he was the first Latin American to become World President of Junior Chamber International —a global organization dedicated to promoting entrepreneurial excellence. Izurieta is notable for his work towards the inclusion of Ecuador into the World Trade Organization (WTO) and for promoting free trade. He served as Vice-Minister of Foreign Relations during the presidency of Sixto Durán Ballén (1992–1996) and led Ecuador's negotiating team during the World Trade Organization (WTO) talks. Additionally, he led different official projects for the Ecuadorian Government to promote trade throughout the world. These projects included diplomatic missions to Switzerland, Russia, United States, Canada, and Argentina, among others. He is the brother of former Labor Minister of Ecuador, Raúl Izurieta Mora-Bowen.

He obtained his high-school diploma at Tower Hill School in Wilmington, Delaware and his engineering degree at Central University in Quito, Ecuador. He has a Masters of Science Degree at Montana State University and holds a post-graduate degree from the Institute of Higher Studies in Ecuador.

== Current position ==
He currently serves as honorary consul of Bangladesh in Quito and advises clients on doing business in Ecuador.

== Awards ==
Izurieta was decorated by the Government of Ecuador with the National Merit Award in the Order of Great Cross in 1996. He was decorated by the Government of Chile with the National Merit Award "Bernardo O'Higgins" in the Order of Great Cross in 1995. The Government of Paraguay also awarded him with the "National Merit Award" in the Order of Great Cross in 1995. In 1985 he was named "Man of the Year" by the Ecuador Journalists Association. He was decorated with the "Presidential Award" by Junior Chamber of Japan in 1980 and with an award in the Order of "Caballero" by the Junior Chamber of Colombia in 1980. He received the "Junior Chamber" award by the Junior Chamber of Ecuador in 1980.

== Previous designations and positions ==
Izurieta co-founded the company Tabacarcen, which is the logistics and cargo operator at Mariscal Sucre International Airport, Quito.

He was Chief negotiator for Ecuador's adhesion to WTO (1993–1996) and President of Ecuador's Negotiating Body for International Trade Agreements (1992–1996).

Izurieta has served as Member of the Board for Cut-flower Association (Expoflores 2002–2004). President of Bi-national Chambers Federation (FECABE 1997–2000, 2002–2003). Vicepresident of Ecuadorean-Canadian Chamber (2000–2003). He was designated Dean of the Consular Body in Quito (2000–2001). President of Ecuadorean-Venezuelan Chamber (CACEVEN 1996–2000). Vicepresident of Pacific Basin Economic Council (PBEC 1998–2000). Member of the Board of Exporter's Federation (FEDEXPOR 1996–2000). Vicepresident for IX World Conference United Nations Conference on Trade and Development (UNCTAD 1996). Member of Ecuador's National Export Promoting Council (1993–1996). Member of the Board for Federación Latinoamericana de Empresas en Biotecnología, Rio de Janeiro, Brasil (1990–1994). Founder and President of the Board for Ecuador's Non-Traditional Exports Program (1990–1992). President INCAE Ecuador (1990–1992). Member of the Executive Council Instituto Centroamericano de Administración de Empresas (INCAE) Costa Rica (1990–1992). Board Member for Banco Nacional de Fomento from 1988 to 1992. Member of the Board (representing the private sector) for Fertilizantes Ecuatorianos S.A. (State-owned Enterprise) (1988–1992). Member of the Board for the Foundation for Agricultural Development (FUNDAGRO 1989). President of Agricultural Chambers Federation of Ecuador (1988–1989). Vicepresident of the Board for Ecuador Corporation for the Development of Forestry (1988–1990). President of Agricultural Chamber Zone I (1987–1989). President of National Association of Entrepreneurs (ANDE) (1990–1992). President of National Poultry Association (FENADE 1983–1989). President for the Center for Entrepreneurial Formation (CEFE 1983–1988). Board Member for Project Concern International, San Diego, California (1983–1986). Member of the Board for Ecuadorean Foundation for Development (1978–1980). Member of the Board, Chamber of Industry of Pichincha (1978). Member of the Board (representing private sector) of the National Commerce Company (State-owned Enterprise)(1978). Ecuador representative for American Field Service (AFS) 1967–1969). President of the National Feeds Association (AFABA 1975–1979).

== Conferences ==
Izurieta has given numerous conferences on trade and agriculture of which those at Cornell, Ithaca, NY (2000), Agritrade in Guatemala (1991) and University of Arizona, Tucson, Arizona (1969) stand out.

== Legal disputes ==
In November 2004 the Ecuadorian prosecutor for crimes against the environment and heritage demanded preventive jail-time against Izurieta. Charges concerned the illegal commercialization of several types of flowers. The patents relating to the flowers were in hands of the company Ecuador Roses. Izurieta responded to the charges by saying that they were made in bad faith and with the intent to harm him. The plaintiff was unable to prove the allegations, preventive jail-time was never enforced, and Izurieta was completely cleared of all charges. Izurieta declined to counter-sue Ecuador Roses under article 494 of the Penal Code which protects citizens from malicious and reckless lawsuits.
