= Abdalá Bucaram =

President of Ecuador from 1996 to 1997

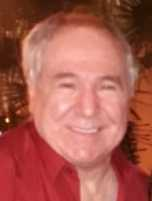
- Bucaram in 2018

38th President of Ecuador
- In office 10 August 1996 – 6 February 1997
- Vice President: Rosalía Arteaga
- Preceded by: Sixto Durán Ballén
- Succeeded by: Fabián Alarcón (acting); Rosalía Arteaga

Mayor of Guayaquil
- In office 10 August 1984 – September 1985
- Preceded by: Bolívar Cali Bajaña
- Succeeded by: Jorge Norero González

Personal details
- Born: Abdalá Jaime Bucaram Ortiz; 4 February 1952 (age 74) Guayaquil, Ecuador
- Party: Independent (2014–2017; since 2021)
- Other political affiliations: Ecuadorian Roldosist Party (1983–2014); Fuerza Ecuador (2017–2021)
- Spouse: María Rosa Pulley Vergara (m. 1977)
- Education: University of Guayaquil

Abdalá Jaime Bucaram Ortiz (/ɑːbdəˈlɑː bʊkəˈrɑːm/ ahb-də-LAH buu-kə-RAHM; born 4 February 1952) is an Ecuadorian politician and lawyer who was the 38th president of Ecuador from 1996 until his removal from office in 1997. As president, Bucaram was nicknamed "El Loco Que Ama" ("The Madman Who Loves", a nickname he championed).

Of Lebanese descent, Bucaram was born in Guayaquil and grew up playing sports, becoming a gym teacher before studying law in the University of Guayaquil. He later became the mayor of the town and began his political career. In 1988 and 1992, Bucaram unsuccessfully ran for president, having won in his third attempt in 1996. However, shortly after taking office, Bucaram was criticized for his bad attitude towards the press. He was also involved in several cases which eroded public support.

Bucaram was subsequently removed from office after being declared mentally unfit to rule by the National Congress on 6 February 1997. Fabián Alarcón, the president of the National Congress, became acting president. However, three days later on 9 February, Bucaram's vice president, Rosalía Arteaga, became president which caused a succession dispute with Alarcón on who should succeed Bucaram and thus, a political crisis. However, two days later on 11 February, Alarcón was reinstated as president with Arteaga retaking her previous role as vice president.

Bucaram visited multiple countries in Latin America in an attempt to gain support to regain the presidency. However, the move failed and he lived in exile in Panama under political asylum laws, until he returned to Ecuador in 2017 when the charges against him expired. He started the Ecuadorian Roldosist Party, named after his brother in law Jaime Roldos.

== Personal life ==
Born in Guayaquil, Bucaram is the son of Jacobo Bucaram Elmhalin, the son of Lebanese immigrants, and Rina Ortiz Caicedo. Bucaram was the nephew of the politician Assad Bucaram, who was the mayor of Guayaquil. His sister, Martha Bucaram, was married to former President Jaime Roldós Aguilera, both of whom were killed in a mysterious air crash. His older brother is engineer and politician Jacobo Bucaram.

He lived in Kennedy Norte, a neighborhood next to the José Joaquín de Olmedo International Airport, prior to fleeing for Panama after the deposition of his government.

== Sporting career ==
Bucaram grew up playing football in the streets of Guayaquil and later went on to become a successful athlete and earn a degree in physical education. He was also a hurdler. He was the flag bearer for Ecuador at the 1972 Summer Olympics but did not compete in the Games due to injury. He was the police chief of Guayas and the president of Barcelona Sporting Club, a football team from his hometown.

== Early political career ==
While working as a gym teacher, Bucaram earned a law degree and soon began his political career.

He became the mayor of Guayaquil, and the founder and member of the Ecuadorian Roldosist Party (PRE). He then competed unsuccessfully for the presidency of Ecuador in 1988 and 1992.

In the 1996 Ecuadorian general election, Bucaram defeated Social Christian Party (PSC) candidate Jaime Nebot by winning in all but one of the 21 provinces, becoming the first to do so.

== Presidency ==
Bucaram was president from 10 August 1996 to 6 February 1997. His cabinet was put together by Vice President Rosalía Arteaga. Shortly after taking office, the press criticized Bucaram for his behavior which was described as flamboyant and sometimes even rude. Within months, Bucaram was accused of embezzling millions of dollars of public funds. He was described as a "messianic personality and unconventional that attracted criticism from his critics and the media" by Anadolu Agency, a Turkish state news agency.

=== Impeachment ===
In February 1997, Bucaram was impeached by the National Congress because of concerns about his capacity to act in the office of the presidency. While the initial charge was for mental incapacity, the details of the impeachment specifically cited economic mismanagement, undignified behavior, deliberate oversight of crimes, and betrayal of campaign promises.

== Life after impeachment ==
Bucaram received political asylum in Panama after several corruption charges were laid against him. He returned on Saturday, 2 April 2005, after the corruption charges were lifted the previous day. He stayed in Guayaquil for about two and a half weeks. The corruption charges against him were reinstated after Lucio Gutiérrez was forced to leave to avoid the charges.

On 1 December 2014, Bucaram's son Abdalá "Dalo" Bucarám Jr. renounced his seat in the Ecuadorian National Assembly.

On 3 June 2020, Attorney General Diana Salazar Méndez announced that a stock of 5,000 masks and 2,000 COVID-19 tests had been found at Bucaram's residence preventing their use in combatting a large outbreak of the COVID-19 pandemic.

He was accused of several crimes including stealing from the Central Bank and Customs and mismanaging the COVID-19 pandemic and barred from entering the United States. After he took office, Bucaram tried to reorganize the state which led to a culture of bribery and favoritism.

In August 2020, Bucaram was arrested and released at his home in Guayaquil as part of an organized crime investigation. The investigation centered on the murder of an Israeli citizen, Tomer Sheinman (also known as Shy Dahan), a few days earlier in the Guayaquil jail. Bucaram was implicated because an audio conversation between Bucaram and the murdered Sheinman (Dahan) was found. Sheinman (Dahan) was involved in trading medical supplies with Bucaram's son, Jacobo.

On 9 March 2022, the United States announced that, "due to his involvement in significant corruption, including misappropriation of public funds, accepting bribes, and interfering with public processes," Bucaram would be barred from entering the country.

As of December 2023, Bucaram has started to stream his political speeches in the video game Grand Theft Auto V on role-play servers, which he streams live on Twitch.tv.

Political offices
Preceded by Bolívar Cali Bajaña	Mayor of Guayaquil; 1984–1985	Succeeded by Jorge Norero
Preceded by Sixto Durán Ballén	President of Ecuador; 1996–1997	Succeeded by Fabian Alarcon
Party political offices
Preceded by New creation	Supreme Director of the Ecuadorian Roldosist Party; 1982–1989	Succeeded by María Rosa Pulley
Preceded by María Rosa Pulley	Supreme Director of the Ecuadorian Roldosist Party; 1991–2008	Succeeded by Dalo Bucaram
Olympic Games
Preceded by Fernando González	Flag bearer for Ecuador; Munich 1972	Succeeded by Nelson Suárez
