= María Mercedes Cuesta =

Ecuadorian journalist and politician

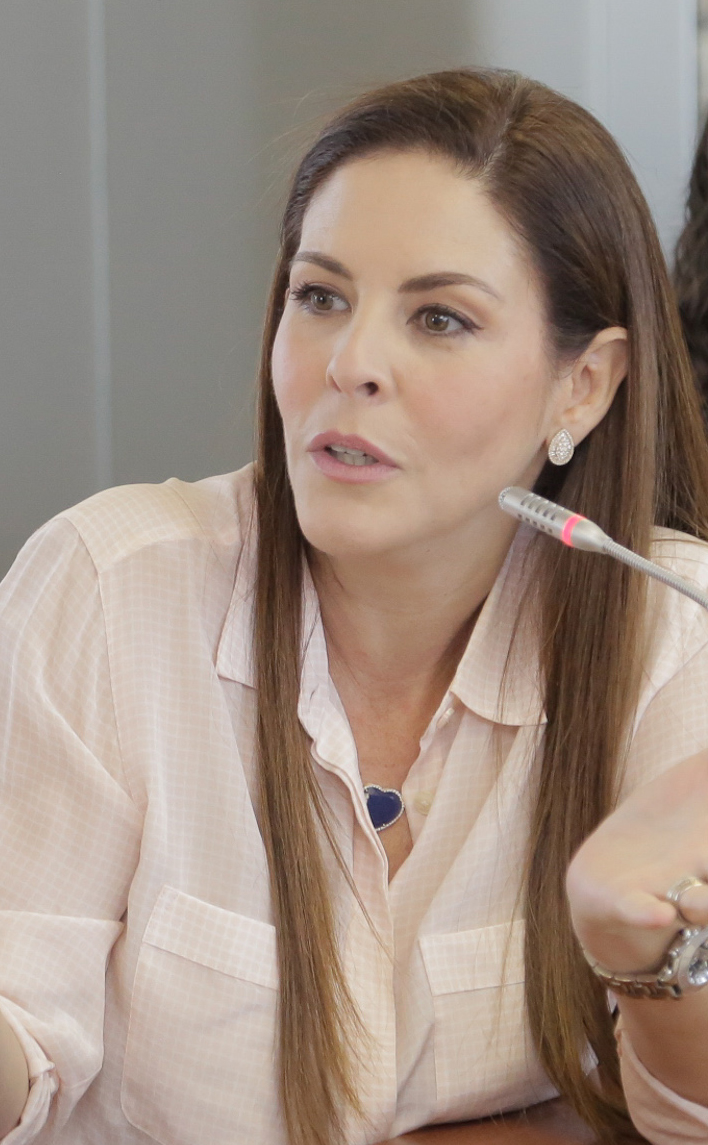

Member of the National Assembly
- In office 14 May 2017 – 14 May 2021

Personal details
- Born: 28 November 1973 (age 52) Guayaquil, Guayas, Ecuador
- Party: Fuerza Ecuador (until 2019)
- Occupation: Journalist; politician

María Mercedes Cuesta Concari (born 28 November 1973) is an Ecuadorian journalist and politician. She has worked in news programs in Gamavisión, Telesistema, TC Televisión, CRE, SíTV, Ecuavisa, and Teleamazonas. From 2017 to 2021, she served as a member of the National Assembly, which she was elected as part of Fuerza Ecuador, although she had separated from it in August 2019.

== Early years ==
Cuesta was born in Guayaquil on 28 November 1973. She studied at the Nuevo Mundo Educational Center.
