= Junior Chamber International =

Organization

- Abbreviation: JCI
- Formation: 13 October 1915; 111 years ago
- Founder: Henry Giessenbier
- Founded at: St. Louis, Missouri, US
- Type: NGO
- Headquarters: Chesterfield, Missouri, US
- Coordinates: 38°39′20″N 90°33′24″W
- Region served: Worldwide
- Methods: Community service
- Members: 160,000+ (2019)
- Official language: All languages adopted by individual National Organizations as their official languages are the official languages of JCI
- Secretary General: (Monaco) Elvin Teo
- World President: Alejandra Castillo (2026) (Bolivia)
- Staff: 22 (2020)
- Website: jci.cc

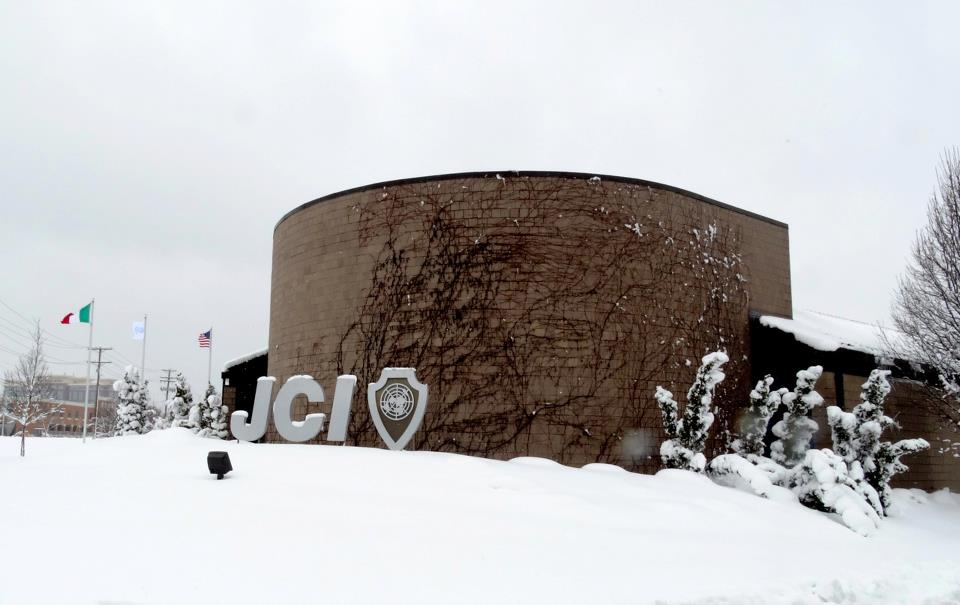
JCI world headquarters in the St. Louis suburb of Chesterfield

Junior Chamber International, commonly referred to as JCI, is a non-profit international non-governmental organization of young people between 18 and 40 years old. It has members in about 127 countries, and regional or national organizations in most of them.

The first local Junior Chamber chapter was founded in 1915, but the international umbrella organization Junior Chamber International (JCI) was founded in Mexico in 1944. It has consultative status with the Council of Europe, with the Economic and Social Council of the United Nations and with UNESCO. It encourages young people to become active citizens and to participate in efforts towards social and economic development, international cooperation, good-will, and understanding.

== History ==
By the age of 18, Henry Giessenbier Jr. had formed the Herculaneum Dance Club, a social outlet for the community's youth. On October 13, 1915, the first JCI Movement was founded when 32 men joined to form the Young Men's Progressive Civic Association (YMPCA) at the Mission Inn located in their hometown of St. Louis, USA. The Young Men's Progressive Civic Association members received acknowledgement from the broader community, however on November 30, 1915 official recognition of the organization was granted after enrolling as a member of the Mayor's Conference of Civic Organizations. One year later, the YMPCA became known as the Junior Citizens and soon the Junior Chamber of Commerce, after affiliating with the St. Louis Chamber of Commerce. On December 11, 1944, an Inter-American Congress was held in Mexico City. Representatives from the United States, Costa Rica, El Salvador, Guatemala, Honduras, Mexico, Nicaragua and Panama gathered to officially establish Henry Giessenbier's 24-year-old civic association as an international organization, Junior Chamber International. In 2015 the organization celebrated its 100th anniversary.

== Activities ==
The local organizations are referred to as Local Organization (LO) with a local board, and it is at the local level that most activities take place: conferences, projects, local publications, etc. A LO will be member of a national organization or National Organization (NO) that is governed by a national board. The different NOs are members of Junior Chamber International (JCI). The international organization publishes JCI World, a quarterly magazine, in six languages. It holds an annual conference, the JCI World Congress, in November of each year and regional annual meetings, the JCI Area Conferences.

In the United States the local organizations run a.o. the Alabama Deep Sea Fishing Rodeo, the Greater Gulf State Fair, and the Azalea Trail Maids under the name Jaycees.

Typically leadership positions in the organization are held only for one year; this goes for JCI local Presidents, for JCI National Presidents and also for the JCI World Presidents. Some members are given life membership of the organization and become "senators" and members of the JCI Senate. The Ten Outstanding Young Persons of the World (TOYP) program is organized annually by Junior Chamber International.

== See also ==
- Active citizenship
- List of presidents of the Junior Chamber International
- Global citizenship
- United Nations
