= Alberto Dahik =

Ecuadorian politician

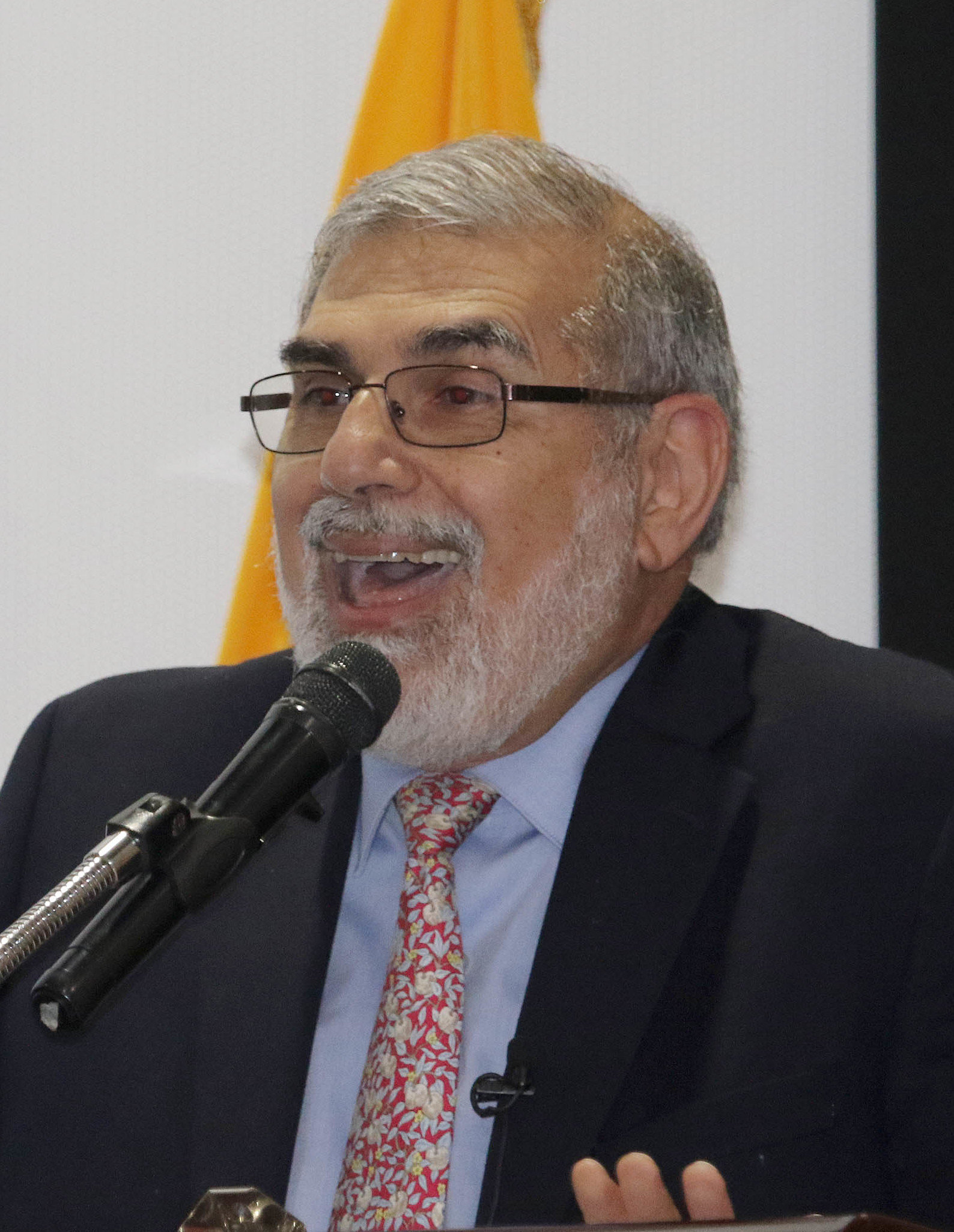

Vice President of Ecuador
- In office 10 August 1992 – 11 October 1995
- President: Sixto Duran-Ballen
- Preceded by: Luis Parodi Valverde
- Succeeded by: Eduardo Peña

Member of the Congress
- In office August 1988 – August 1992

Minister of Finance
- In office June–September 1986
- Preceded by: Francisco Swett
- Succeeded by: Rodrigo Espinosa Bermeo

Personal details
- Born: 27 August 1953 (age 72) Guayaquil, Ecuador
- Party: Conservative Party

Alberto Dahik Garzozi (born 27 August 1953) is an Ecuadorian politician of Lebanese ancestry. He was Vice President of Ecuador from 10 August 1992 to 11 October 1995 during the Sixto Durán Ballén administration.

In 1995, he was forced out of office when the nation's Supreme Court filed a motion to charge Dahik with embezzlement. However, Dahik escaped to Costa Rica where he was granted asylum. In December 2011, he returned to Ecuador while then-President Rafael Correa granted Dahik amnesty. In January 2012, the court acquitted Dahik of all crimes.

== Early life ==
Dahik was educated in economics at The University of Western Ontario and obtained a master's degree from Princeton University, being directed in the latter by Nobel laureate W. Arthur Lewis. He served as Minister of Finance during 1986 (when he was impeached) and member of Congress from 1988 to 1992. It was during this tenure, in October 1990, that he was involved in a highly publicized incident while a congressional fight was taking place: he was hit by an ashtray tossed by a Roldosist congressman.

== Vice Presidency ==
At the end of 1991, Dahik's Conservative Party established an alliance with Sixto Durán Ballén's Republican Union Party and chose Dahik as his running mate for the 1992 presidential election, which he won against Jaime Nebot. As Vice President in Durán Ballén's administration, Dahik was responsible in designing economic policies. He was important member of Conservative Party.

=== Embezzlement charges ===
In 1995, the Supreme Court announced that it had enough evidence to arrest Dahik on charges of embezzlement, but Dahik managed to flee to Costa Rica where he was granted political asylum by that country on 30 March 1996. Dahik briefly returned to Ecuador in April 2005 after his process was annulled by the so-called Pichicorte, unconstitutionally set by Lucio Gutierrez's government.

Ecuador's constitution enacted the necessity of an impeachment process in Congress for the President and Vice-President before any legal procedure regarding the exercise of public duty. The process was set up and Dahik was declared innocent by both Parliament and the Comptroller General of the country, turning then his trial unconstitutional and illegal.

== Return to Ecuador ==
On 23 December 2011 Dahik returned to Ecuador after 16 years of exile, a year after President Rafael Correa called on the National Assembly of Ecuador to grant him amnesty, based on his belief that Dahik is an honest man. His prison order was lifted in order to present himself to a judge every two weeks as precautionary measure. His first appearance at the court occurred on 26 December.

On 20 January 2012, Dahik was acquitted by the First Chamber of the National Court of Justice on the basis that he was subjected to a "judicial atrocity". His case was finally archived in March 2013.

Political offices
Preceded by Luis Parodi Valverde	Vice President of Ecuador; 1992-1995	Succeeded by Eduardo Peña Triviño
