= National Union of Educators =

Trade union in South Africa

The National Union of Educators (NUE) was a trade union representing education workers in South Africa.

The union was founded in 1997, when the South African Teachers' Association merged with the Transvaal Teachers' Association and the Transvaal Association of Teachers. Its initial membership was of white and "coloured" workers, but it accepted members regardless of ethnicity and soon expanded across the country. Like all its forerunners, the union affiliated to the National Professional Teachers' Organisation of South Africa (NAPTOSA). In 2006, the union became an integral part of NAPTOSA.
