= Fuerza Ecuador =

Political party in Ecuador

Ecuador's Force Fuerza Ecuador
- Founder: Abdalá Bucaram, Jr.
- Founded: 20 October 2014
- Registered: 10 September 2015
- Dissolved: 27 November 2021
- Preceded by: Ecuadorian Roldosist Party
- Headquarters: Guayaquil, Ecuador
- Ideology: Populism
- Political position: Big tent Centre-left (self-proclaimed)
- Colors: Red, yellow, white, black
- Seats in the National Assembly: 0 / 137

Website
- www.fuerza.ec

Fuerza Ecuador (Spanish: Ecuador's Force) was a political party in Ecuador.

== History ==
The party was established on 20 October 2014 by Abdalá Bucaram, Jr. as a successor to the Ecuadorian Roldosist Party, which had its legal registration withdrawn. It was registered in 2015 by the National Electoral Council after presenting 226,040 signatures.

Bucaram was the party's presidential candidate for the 2017 general elections, finishing fifth with 5% of the vote. The party also won a single seat in the National Assembly, taken by María Mercedes Cuesta.

On 27 November 2021 the National Electoral Council de-registered Fuerza Ecuador for failing to meet the necessary percentage of votes or elected positions in two consecutive elections.
