= Eric Stevenson =

Eric Stevenson may refer to:

- Eric Stevenson (politician) (born 1966), former member of the New York State Assembly
- Eric Stevenson (footballer) (1942–2017), Scottish former footballer
- Eric Stevenson (soccer) (born 1990), American soccer player
