= National Electoral Council =

National Electoral Council may refer to:

- National Electoral Council (Colombia)
- National Electoral Council (Ecuador)
- National Electoral Council (Honduras)
- National Electoral Council (Venezuela)
