= Henry Giessenbier =

American banker; founded the Jaycees

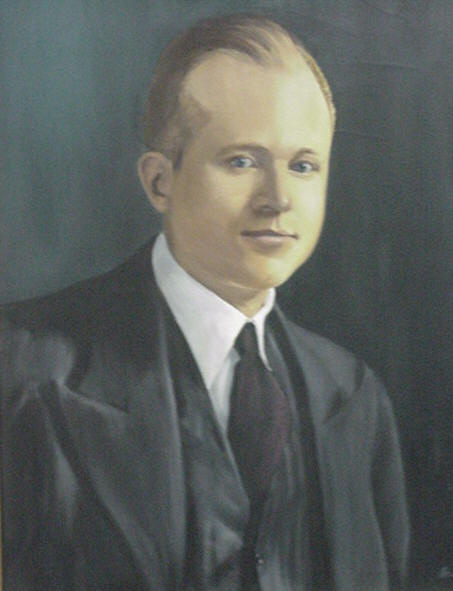
Portrait of Henry Giessenbier

Henry "Hy" Giessenbier Jr (1892–1935) was an American banker in St. Louis, Missouri, of German ancestry. He became the founder of the Young Men's Progressive Civic Association in 1915 and the United States Junior Chamber in 1920.

He died aged 43 of kidney complications.
