= Ecuadorian Roldosist Party =

Ecuadorian Roldosist Party Partido Roldosista Ecuatoriano
- Founder: Abdalá Bucaram
- Founded: December 1982
- Dissolved: 3 July 2014
- Succeeded by: Fuerza Ecuador
- Headquarters: Guayaquil, Ecuador
- Ideology: Populism
- Regional affiliation: COPPPAL
- Colors: Red, yellow, white, black

Website
- www.dalobucaram.com

The Ecuadorian Roldosist Party (PRE) (Partido Roldosista Ecuatoriano) was a populist political party in Ecuador. The party was named after former President Jaime Roldós. It was founded after Roldós' death by his brother-in-law Abdalá Bucaram as a more leftish spin-off from the Concentration of People's Forces. Bucaram was elected President in 1996 but was impeached the following year. Though Jaime Roldós's brother León Roldós is still very involved in Ecuadorian politics, he is not a member of the Roldosist Party.

At the legislative elections on 20 October 2002, the party won 15 out of 100 seats. Its candidate Jacobo Bucaram Ortiz won 11.9% of the vote in the presidential elections of the same day, coming in 6th place. At the legislative elections of October 15, 2006, the party was badly defeated, winning 6 of 100 seats in the Congress. Its presidential candidate in 1998, Álvaro Noboa, who was narrowly defeated in that election, ran as a presidential candidate in 2002, 2006 and 2009 for another party and participated unsuccessfully in a runoff both times. The Roldosist Party's own presidential candidate for the 2006 election, Fernando Rosero received less than 2% of the vote.

In 2014, the party's legal status was withdrawn by the National Electoral Council. A successor party, Fuerza Ecuador, was established in its place.
