= Sixto Durán Ballén =

President of Ecuador from 1992 to 1996

Sixto Durán-Ballén
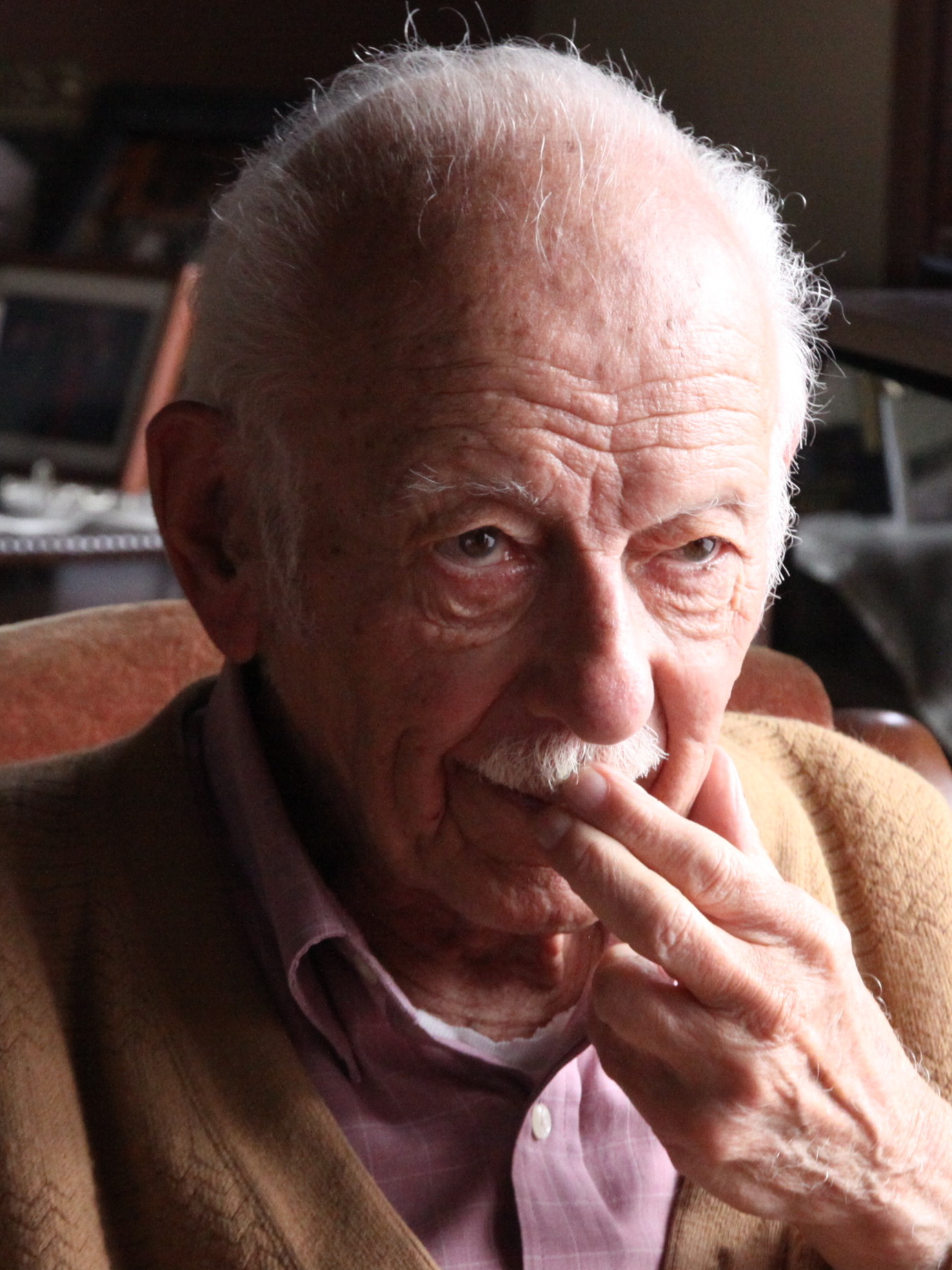
- Durán Ballén in 2011

37th President of Ecuador
- In office 10 August 1992 – 10 August 1996
- Vice President: Alberto Dahik (1992–1995); Eduardo Peña Triviño (1995–1996)
- Preceded by: Rodrigo Borja
- Succeeded by: Abdalá Bucaram

12th Mayor of Quito
- In office 1 August 1970 – 16 February 1978
- Preceded by: Jaime del Castillo
- Succeeded by: Álvaro Pérez Intriago

Personal details
- Born: Sixto Alfonso Durán-Ballén Cordovez; 14 July 1921 Boston, Massachusetts, U.S.
- Died: 15 November 2016 (aged 95) Quito, Pichincha Province, Ecuador
- Resting place: Church of Santa Teresita, Quito
- Party: Republican Union Party (1991–1996)
- Other political affiliations: Social Christian Party (1951–1991)
- Spouse: Josefina Villalobos (m. 1945)
- Children: 9
- Education: Stevens Institute of Technology; University of Wisconsin–Madison; Columbia University

Sixto Alfonso Durán-Ballén Cordovez (14 July 1921 – 15 November 2016) was an Ecuadorian political figure and architect who served as the 37th president of Ecuador from 1992 to 1996. He previously served as mayor of Quito between 1970 and 1978. In 1951, he co-founded a political party, the Social Christian Party. In 1991, he left the Social Christian Party and formed a new conservative group, the Republican Union Party (PUR), before running for president for the third time in 1992 where he was elected president.

Durán Ballén served as congressman in 1984 and again in 1998. He helped to modernize the Ecuadorian economy while facing challenges from the World Bank and oversaw and resolved the Cenepa War during the last years of his presidency. He received positive ratings, upon leaving office four years later on 10 August 1996. His presidency was seen favorably by the public polls, but received mixed opinions from scholars.

== Early life ==
Durán-Ballén was born on 14 July 1921, in Boston, Massachusetts. He was born while his parents, Sixto Durán-Ballén Romero and Maria Eugenia Cordovéz y Cayzedo, were on a diplomatic mission in the United States.

Ballén studied at San Jose La Salle grammar schools in Guayaquil and in Quito. His secondary schooling was with the Jesuits at San Gabriel high school. Durán-Ballén studied architecture at Columbia University, where he graduated first in his class in 1945.

He married Josefina Villalobos in New York in 1945.

== Early political career ==
Durán-Ballén was one of the founders of the Social Christian Party (PSC) together with Camilo Ponce Enríquez in 1955. Under the presidency of Camilo Ponce Enríquez, he served as minister of public works from 1956 to 1960. Went on to Washington DC where was named deputy director of Projects Analysis, at the beginnings of the Inter-American Development Bank. Returning in 1968 to his private practice of Architecture, ran for Mayor and was elected Mayor of Quito in 1970 and re-elected in 1974.

In 1979 he ran as the PSC's presidential candidate, but was defeated by the populist Jaime Roldós Aguilera. In 1984, President Leon Febres-Cordero, appointed Durán-Ballén Minister of Housing, position he held until 1988 when the Social Christian Party chose him to run again for president. However "his heart was not in it" as his youngest daughter of his nine children was going through the rigors of bone marrow transplant and chemotherapy because of leukemia. She died in 1989 at the age of 29.

== Presidency (1992–1996) ==
=== 1992 Ecuadorian presidential election ===
At the end of 1990 he publicly criticized the direction of the PSC in a public statement. In February 1991 he contested the internal elections for the party leadership, in which the Guayaquil faction (led by Febres-Cordero) succeeded in appointing Jaime Nebot as presidential candidate and national director. Durán-Ballén alleged irregularities in the election of party delegates, to no avail (and despite opinion polls reportedly giving him advantage over Nebot).

As a consequence, Durán-Ballén and his supporters left the party to form the more right-wing Republican Union Party. This decision was widely popular as it was seen as breaking with the political establishment, even being compared with Peru's Alberto Fujimori in the media. They subsequently entered into a controversial alliance with the Conservative Party. Eventually, Durán defeated Nebot in the second round of the 1992 presidential election.

=== Tenure ===
Durán-Ballén was inaugurated president on 10 August 1992. At age 71, Ballén was the oldest person to have served as president. During his time as president, he actively pursued structural reform to modernize the Ecuadorian state and cut down wasteful bureaucratic spending. During his presidency, Ballén lowered the Ecuadorian inflation from 67% to 24%. The result was a significant reduction of government deficits and a thriving private sector. Durán-Ballén also led Ecuador into membership in the WTO, with negotiations being led by his subsecretary of Foreign Affairs, Patricio Izurieta Mora-Bowen. The admission to the WTO had a significant impact on the nation's political institutions and export competitiveness.

During his presidency, there was criticism towards Ballén's economic policies. Many analysts agree that all these actions carried out under his economic plan meant the prelude to almost absolute insolvency to which the country would arrive in 1998 with an external debt of 16.4 billion dollars. He also faced harsh criticism when he eliminated the External Credit Committee in 1995 and was accused of abuse and subjection to public indebtedness. In response to the corruption allegations against him, Ballén called for a second popular referendum to allow reforms as per modernization of the state, which were largely rejected.

Ballén faced challenges while attempting to secure the modernization of the Ecuadorian economy from the World Bank. The World Bank insistent on the privatization of public services which resulted in the reduction of jobs, the elimination of alleged subsidies and the profitability of the Ecuadorian state management.

In 1995, Ballén proved to be one of Ecuador's most successful war-time leaders when his determined leadership united a divided country under the theme Ni un paso atras which means "not a single step backwards" during the Cenepa War with Peru. His last years as president, he focused on the resolution of the Cenepa War with President of Peru Alberto Fujimori. The war ended with both nations withdrawing troops on 28 December 1995, a few months before Ballén left office.

On 10 August 1996, Ballén was succeeded by Abdalá Bucaram. Upon leaving office, Ballén was praised by the public opinion, while his economic policies and his involvement in the Cenepa War, caused his presidency to have mixed opinions from scholars.

== Post–presidency (1996–2016) ==
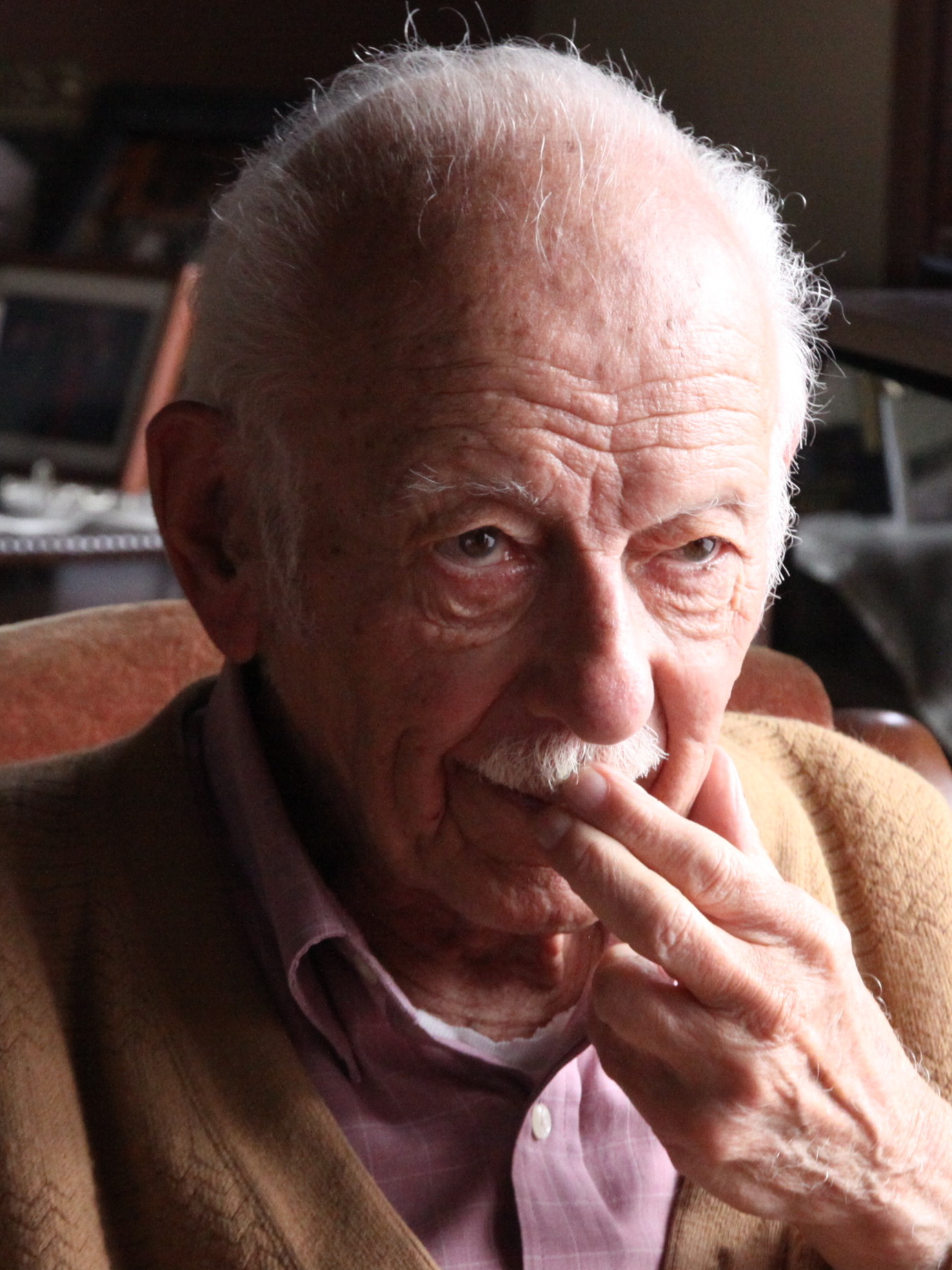
Ballén in 2011

Following his presidency, Ballén was elected deputy for the Pichincha Province in 1998. Between 2001 and 2003, he served as an ambassador to the Court of St. James in London.

In 2005, he wrote an autobiography titled A mi manera... Los años de Carondelet and edited by the publisher of the Universidad Andina Simón Bolívar. In 2006, he appeared as a candidate for the Andean Parliament for the Christian Democratic Union, but was not elected.

=== Death ===
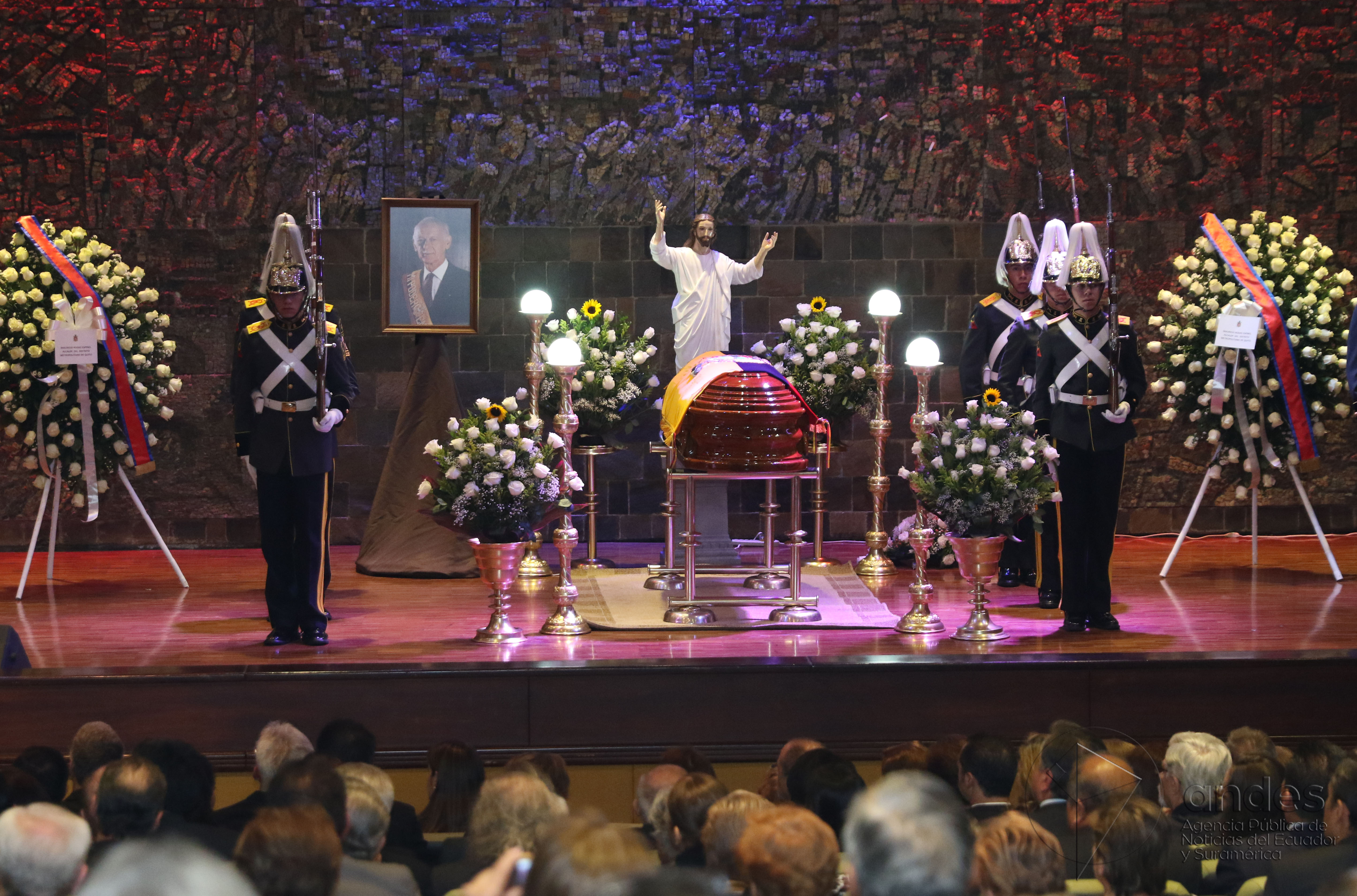
Funeral chapel of Durán-Ballén, 16 November 2016

Ballén died in his sleep at his home in Northern Quito on the night of 15 November 2016, from natural causes at the age of 95. He is survived by his wife Josefina and their eight children.

His state funeral was held on the following day on 16 November at Quito's city hall. His funeral procession later conclude at a religious service at the Cathedral of Quito. The incumbent president, Rafael Correa did not attend the funeral but he declared three days of national mourning. Former president Gustavo Noboa and Ballén's first vice president, Alberto Dahik, were also those in attendance. His remains were later buried in a vault at the Church of Santa Teresita in Quito.

== Legacy ==
Duran-Ballen's term in office was characterized by a continued political stalemate with a Congress led by his former party. The impeachment of his Vice President Alberto Dahik, for allegedly using public funds illicitly, further weakened his stance. However, none of these claims were properly supported and are suspected to have been started by his political adversaries to weaken his legacy. Duran-Ballen's legacy also stands for his work as an independent architect, he promoted several urban development projects in Quito. Among his works are the current headquarters of the Municipality of Quito, the Legislative Palace, and the IESS headquarters in El Ejido, among others.

In December 2021, a statue of him was erected in Quito.

Preceded by Rodrigo Borja	37th President of Ecuador; 10 August 1992 – 10 August 1996	Succeeded by Abdalá Bucaram
