= Jaime Nebot =

Ecuadorian lawyer and politician (born 1946)

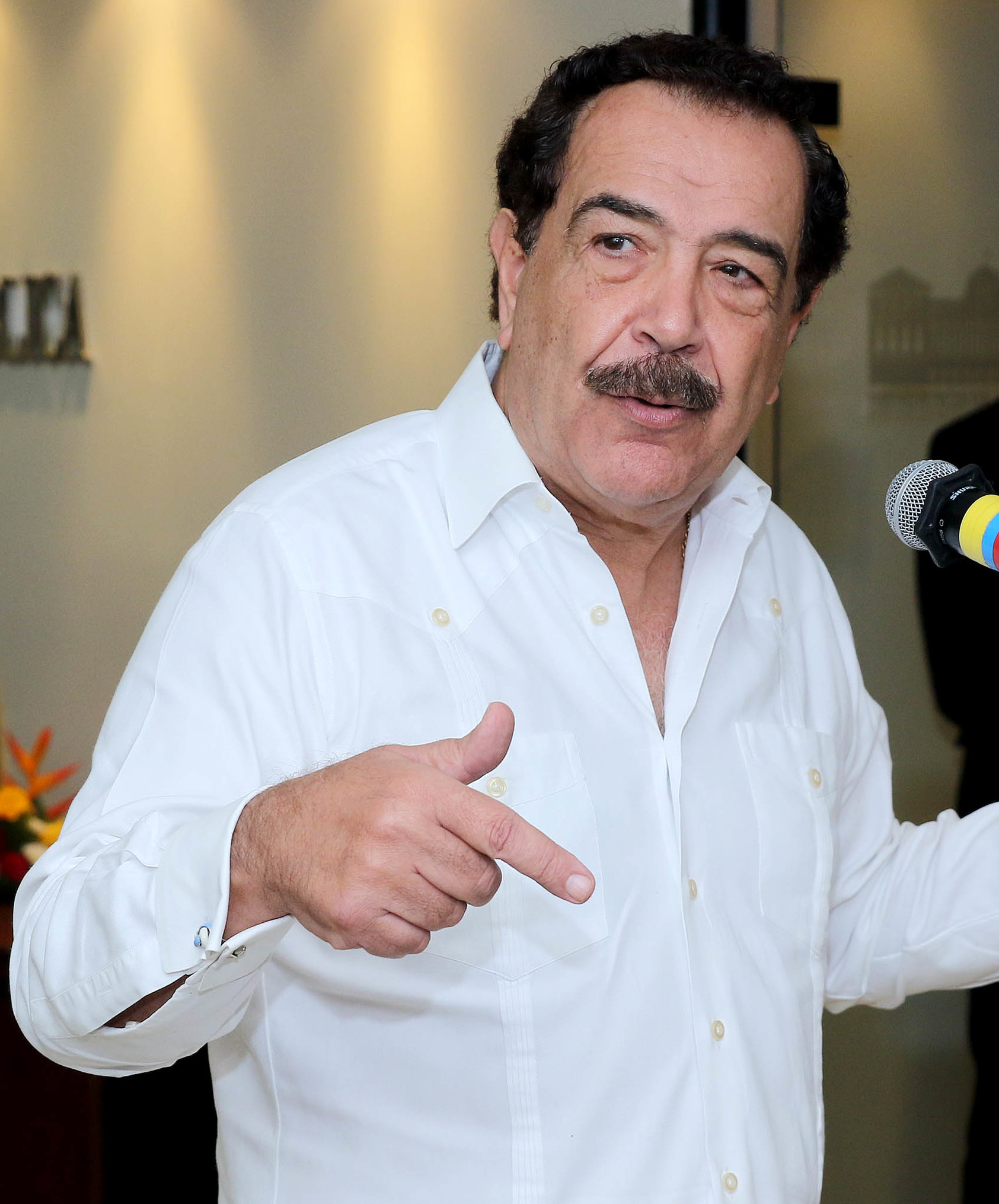

Mayor of Guayaquil
- In office August 10, 2000 – May 14, 2019
- Preceded by: León Febres-Cordero Rivadeneira
- Succeeded by: Cynthia Viteri

Governor of the Guayas Province
- In office August 1984 – August 1988
- Preceded by: Gustavo Noboa

Member of the National Congress from the Guayas Province
- In office August 1, 1998 – August 10, 2000
- In office August 8, 1990 – August 9, 1992

Personal details
- Born: Jaime José Nebot Saadi; October 22, 1946 (age 79) Guayaquil, Ecuador
- Party: Madera de Guerrero; Social Christian Party (Partido Social Cristiano)
- Education: Catholic University of Guayaquil

Jaime José Nebot Saadi (born October 22, 1946) is an Ecuadorian lawyer and politician. He formerly served as mayor of Guayaquil, which is Ecuador's largest city. He is affiliated with the Christian Social Party (PSC) and the Madera de Guerrero Civic Movement. Nebot ran twice for president of Ecuador, in 1992 losing against Sixto Duran-Ballén, and in 1996 losing against Abdalá Bucaram.

== Background ==
Nebot was born to a prominent Guayaquil family on October 22, 1946. His father, Jaime Nebot Velasco (1921-2001), of Catalan background, was a government minister during the administration of President José María Velasco Ibarra (1968–1972). His mother is Sulema Saadi, the daughter of a Lebanese immigrant who came to Ecuador after living in Brazil. Nebot was educated in various Catholic schools, including Colegio Cristóbal Colón in Guayaquil and Colegio San Gabriel in Quito. He has a law degree from Católica Santiago de Guayaquil.

Nebot entered politics in 1984, when he was appointed governor of Guayas province (the district encompassing Guayaquil) by then-president León Febres-Cordero. During his tenure as governor he sent police on a three-day operation to evict more than 700 families who were squatting on private land in Guayaquil. During an incident in Taura when President Febres-Cordero was kidnapped by some military officials led by Vargas Passo, Nebot played an important role in the negotiations for his freedom.

He was governor until 1988, when Febres-Cordero's administration ended.

== Incident in congress ==
In 1990 Nebot ran for congress on the Christian Social Party slate and won a seat representing Guayas province. On August 31 of that year, while a parliamentary session was being broadcast on TV, Nebot, visibly agitated, began shrieking at a fellow congressman, Víctor Granda of the Socialist Party. "Come here so I can urinate on you, you insect son of a bitch" Nebot shouted at Granda. "I can't just hit you. I have to urinate on you." Police had to stop Nebot from physically assaulting his opponent. The disagreement stemmed from Granda's alleged backroom dealings with members of other parties.

== Presidential runs ==
In 1992 Nebot ran for president for the first time. Almost all of Nebot's support came from the coastal provinces, Guayas included. He placed second in the first round of elections held in May, getting 26 percent of the vote. He lost the July runoff against Sixto Durán Ballén (one of the co-founders of the PSC back in 1951). Durán Ballén beat Nebot by a 13 point margin.

He ran for president a second time in 1996. Nebot ran on a privatization of public services platform. Opponents claimed that his business-friendly approach would enrich his friends in the Guayaquil business community. Nebot, supported by large agricultural businesses from the coast, spoke at home of more social services. Abroad, he spoke to investors of public payroll cuts. His campaign slogan was "People First."

After placing first in the first round held in May, Nebot ran against populist Abdalá Bucaram in the July runoff. Bucaram succeeded in portraying Nebot as a member of the ruling class, thereby denying him support from the working class. Bucaram's negative campaign struck a chord among many poor voters. For example, when a line in Bucaram's TV ads mentioned the "evil oligarchy," the ads also showed a photo of Nebot with the caption "well pampered rich kid." Nebot "evoked strong feelings of rejection in many who preferred any other candidate." Nebot, for his part, ran as calm figure, elegantly dressed and always smiling. Nebot was also harmed by an untimely remark from his party boss and political mentor, León Febres-Cordero, who said on TV that Bucaram "was the candidate of pimps, prostitutes, and marijuana users." This further alienated Nebot from some voters.

Bucaram won 54 percent of the vote, Nebot 45 percent. After losing the election, Nebot became active in the opposition against Bucaram. In January 1997, Nebot called for the removal of Bucaram from office, arguing that Bucaram was insane. The following month, after a two-day general strike led by the opposition, congress threw Bucaram out of office. Bucaram fled Ecuador and found asylum in Panama. After Bucaram's overthrow, Nebot, at the head of Social Christian Party slate, won a seat in an assembly that redrafted Ecuador's constitution. In the 1998 election, Nebot rejected the Social Christian Party's nomination for the presidency and ran for congress instead. He won a congressional seat and held it until 2000, when he ran for mayor of Guayaquil.

== Tenure as mayor ==
In 2000 Nebot was elected mayor of Guayaquil. He has been reelected in 2004, 2009 and 2014 for another four-year term. He made public works the focus of his administration. He started an urban-renewal program to gentrify blighted areas of Guayaquil's center. In 2006, Nebot inaugurated Metrovía, a mass-transit system based on dedicated lanes for public buses. Metrovía was an effort to decongest Guayaquil's notoriously bad traffic.

Nebot tried to tackle crime, one of Guayaquil's persistent ills. In 2002, Nebot hired former New York City Police Commissioner William Bratton to help draft an anti-crime strategy. Bratton was instrumental in former New York City Mayor Rudolph Giuliani's effort to reduce crime in the 1990s. Guayaquil's new anti-crime strategy included tough penalties for individuals caught begging or selling on the streets of the gentrified areas. They can be imprisoned for up to seven days, or be subject to fines of up to $500.

Nebot built a shopping promenade Malecón 2000 along the west bank of the Guayas River, in the center of Guayaquil. It has been reported that entrance to the precinct is restricted by private security guards.

Violence has played a role in the gentrification plan. In 2003, the media reported 10 cases of excessive police force, including the case of a 53-year-old man who was shot and injured during the eviction of a group of street vendors.

He is suspected of being involved in the Odebrecht corruption scandal.
