= Sariha Moya =

Ecuadorian economist and politician

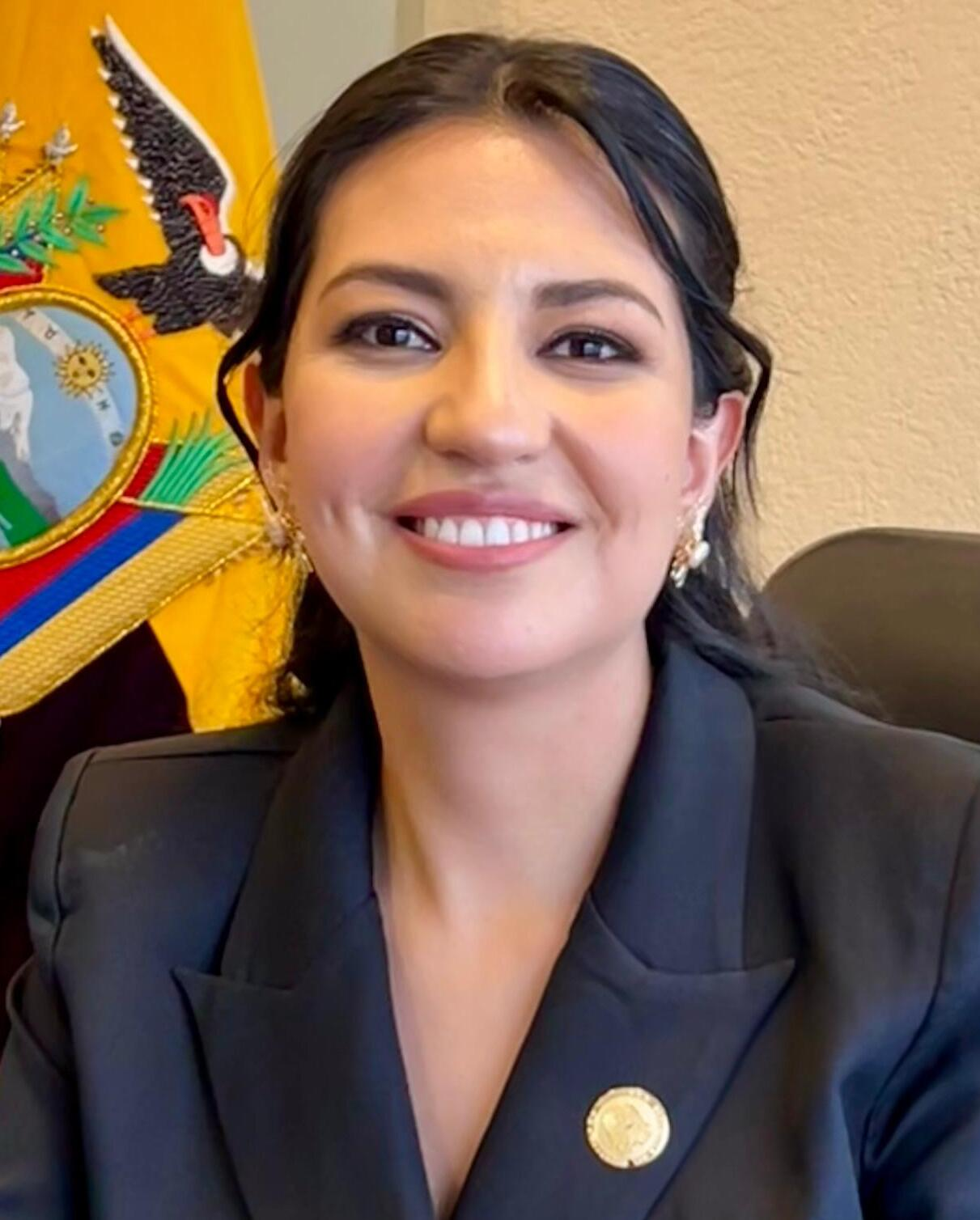
- Official portrait, 2025

Minister of Economy and Finance
- Incumbent
- Assumed office 16 April 2025
- President: Daniel Noboa
- Preceded by: Luis Alberto Jaramillo

Secretary of National Planning and Development
- In office 23 November 2023 – 16 April 2025
- President: Daniel Noboa
- Preceded by: Jairon Merchán Haz
- Succeeded by: Vacant

Acting Vice President of Ecuador
- In office 11 November 2024 – 23 December 2024
- President: Daniel Noboa
- Preceded by: Verónica Abad Rojas
- Succeeded by: Verónica Abad Rojas

Personal details
- Born: Sariha Belén Moya Angulo; 1987 or 1988 (age 37–38) Quito, Ecuador
- Education: Pontifical Catholic University of Ecuador; Carlos III University of Madrid

Sariha Belén Moya Angulo (born 1986 or 1987) is an Ecuadorian economist and politician who has been the Minister of Economy and Finance since 2025. Previously, she served as the acting Vice President of Ecuador from November 2024 to December 2024.

In November 2024, Moya was appointed by President Daniel Noboa to serve as acting vice president, replacing suspended Vice President Verónica Abad Rojas. From 2023 until 2025, Moya served as Secretary of National Planning and Development.

== Education ==
Moya studied at the Pontifical Catholic University of Ecuador and earned a master's degree in economics at Carlos III University of Madrid.

== Political career ==
Moya also worked for the National Planning Secretariat between October 2012 to August 2013 in the role of planning and budget analyst. From January 2016 to June 2017, she served as Director of Monitoring and Evaluation of the National Development Plan of Ecuador.

After Daniel Noboa was elected President of Ecuador in 2023, Noboa initially planned to nominate Moya as Minister of Economy and Finance. Instead she was appointed Secretary of National Planning and Development.

=== Acting Vice Presidency ===
On 9 November 2024, Vice President Verónica Abad Rojas was temporarily suspended as vice president by the Ecuadorian government after failing to leave Israel and travel to Turkey. Noboa selected Moya as acting vice president two days later on 11 November. Noboa praised Moya's public service and management track record as the reason behind his selection of Moya. Abad's suspension was lifted by a judge in December 2024, ordering the labor ministry to give her an apology for the suspension, with Moya stepping down.

Noboa re-appointed Moya on 2 January 2025. However on 4 January, Moya declined to take office to again become acting Vice President and said that she has a health problem and needs rest. Noboa responded by saying that he will designate Cynthia Gellibert as the next acting Vice President. Abad was later suspended again in March 2025 with Noboa appointing Cynthia Gellibert as acting Vice President.

=== Minister of Finance ===
In April 2025, President Noboa announced that he would name Moya to serve as the Minister of Economy and Finance.
