= José Plácido Caamaño =

President of Ecuador (1837–1900)

José María Plácido Caamaño
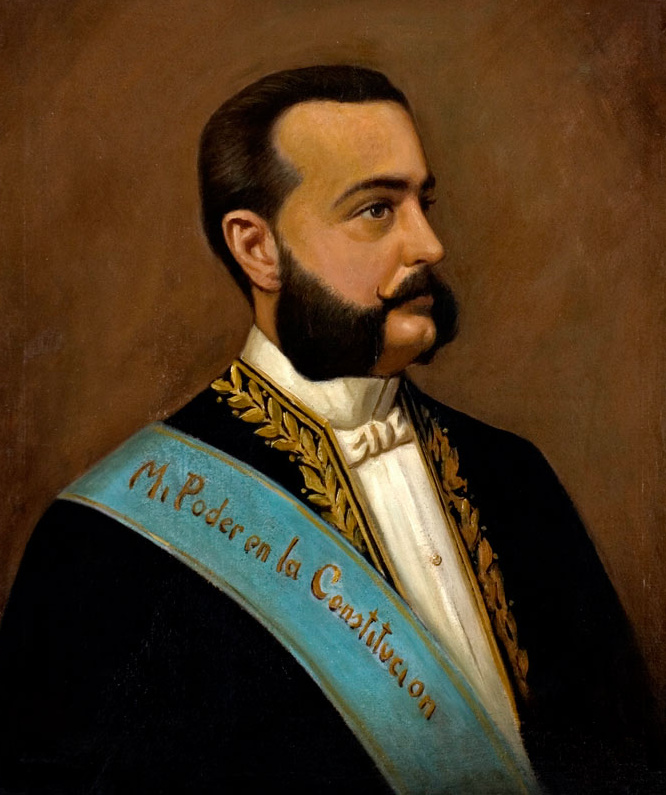

12th President of Ecuador
- In office 10 February 1884 – 30 June 1888
- Vice President: Rafael Pérez Pareja; Agustín Guerrero Lizarzaburu; Pedro José Cevallos
- Preceded by: Himself (as Interim President)
- Succeeded by: Pedro José Cevallos

Ecuadorian Ambassador to United States
- Preceded by: ?
- Succeeded by: Antonio Flores Jijón

Interim President of Ecuador
- In office 15 October 1883 – 10 February 1884
- Preceded by: Ramón Borrero y Cortázar
- Succeeded by: Himself (as President)

Personal details
- Born: 5 October 1837 Guayaquil, Ecuador
- Died: 31 December 1900 (aged 63) Seville, Spain
- Other political affiliations: Progresista Faction
- Occupation: Diplomat

José María Plácido Caamaño y Gómez-Cornejo (5 October 1837 – 31 December 1900) was an Ecuadorian diplomat and served as President of Ecuador 23 November 1883 to 1 July 1888.

Caamaño was born in Guayaquil. He was the grandson of Spanish explorer Jacinto Caamaño. He studied law and theology in the seminary of his native city, and was educated in Quito. Subsequently, he was mayor of Guayaquil, and chief of the custom-house service. He was a member of the Progresista faction, a liberal Catholic party. Caamaño was also a conservative. The unity between the Conservatives and Liberals was achieved during the War of the Restoration but it was short-lived. President Antonio Flores tried to end the conflict between Conservatives and Liberals by creating a moderate Republican Party. Ecuador then had political stability for 12 years, but the conservatism and moderation gave way to the Liberal Revolution of 1895.

He was banished in 1882, went to Lima, organized a revolutionary expedition with which he left Callao on 14 April 1883, and landed in Ecuadorian territory three days afterwards. He organized a division and joined the forces that were besieging Guayaquil about the middle of May. The place was taken by storm by the combined forces under Caamaño, Sarasti, Alfaro, and Salazar. The Progresistas came to power.

A provisional government was appointed until the national convention could meet, and on 11 October 1883 he was elected president ad interim. He was finally proclaimed President of the Republic on 17 February 1884.

He successfully suppressed an insurrection by Eloy Alfaro and his supporters in 1886-1887.

An attempt was made to assassinate him in 1886, and he narrowly escaped death by throwing himself into a river.

Under his administration telegraphs, railways, an institute of sciences, several colleges, and many new schools were added to the resources of Ecuador.

After his term ended, he served as ambassador to the US from 1889 to 1890.

Political offices
Preceded by Ramón Borrero y Cortázar	President of Ecuador; 1883-1888	Succeeded by Pedro José Cevallos
