= Rafael Pérez =

Rafael Pérez may refer to:

- Rafael Pérez (athlete) (born 1946), Costa Rican Olympic runner
- Rafael Pérez (baseball) (born 1982), Dominican left-handed baseball relief pitcher
- Rafael Pérez Pareja (1836–1897), acting president of Ecuador
- Rafael Pérez (police officer) (born 1967), central figure in the LAPD Rampart scandal
