= Daniel Noboa =

President of Ecuador since 2023

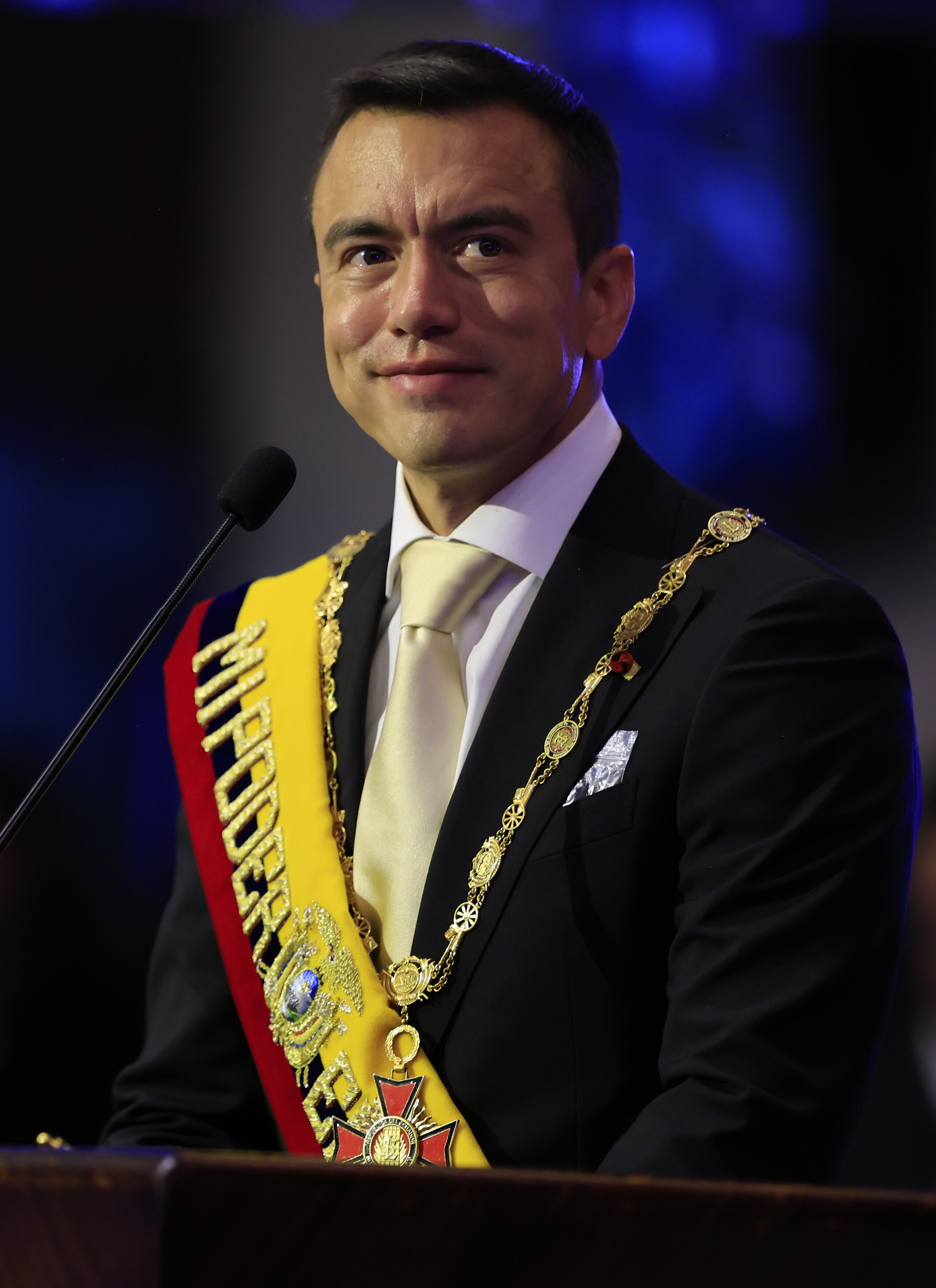
- Noboa with the presidential sash in 2026

48th President of Ecuador
- Incumbent
- Assumed office 23 November 2023
- Vice President: Verónica Abad Rojas (Note: Suspended from 9 November 2024 to 23 December 2024. During this time period, Sariha Moya assumed the role of acting vice president.; Suspended from 30 March 2025 to 24 May 2025. During this time period, Cynthia Gellibert assumed the role of acting vice president.); María José Pinto
- Preceded by: Guillermo Lasso

Member of the National Assembly from Santa Elena
- In office 14 May 2021 – 17 May 2023

Personal details
- Born: Daniel Roy Gilchrist Noboa Azín; 30 November 1987 (age 38) Miami, Florida, U.S.
- Citizenship: Ecuador; United States
- Party: National Democratic Action (since 2022)
- Other political affiliations: United Ecuadorian (before 2022)
- Spouses: Gabriela Goldbaum (m. 2018; div. 2021); Lavinia Valbonesi (m. 2021)
- Children: 3
- Parents: Álvaro Noboa; Anabella Azín
- Education: New York University (BBA); Northwestern University (MBA); George Washington University (MA)

Daniel Roy Gilchrist Noboa Azín (/noʊˈboʊə/ noh-BOH-ə; Latin American Spanish pronunciation: [daˈnjel noˈβo.a]; born 30 November 1987) is an Ecuadorian politician and businessman serving as the 48th and current president of Ecuador since 2023. (Note: Not related to Gustavo Noboa, president of Ecuador during the period between 22 January 2000 and 15 January 2003.) Having first taken office at the age of 35, he is the second-youngest president in the country's history, after Juan José Flores, and the youngest to be elected.

Noboa was a member of the National Assembly of Ecuador from 2021 until 2023 when it was dissolved following the muerte cruzada constitutional mechanism invoked by President Guillermo Lasso. Before his political career, Noboa served in several positions at Noboa Corporation, an exporting business founded by his grandfather. Noboa's father, Álvaro Noboa Pontón, unsuccessfully ran for president of Ecuador five times. He has been widely described as an heir to his family's companies and fortune.

In May 2023, Noboa announced his candidacy for president in the 2023 snap election, running on the National Democratic Action ticket. He advanced to the run-off election in October, facing Luisa González, which many interpreted as an upset given his low polling numbers in the days leading up to the election. Noboa went on to win nearly 52% of the vote in the run-off, defeating González on 15 October 2023. He was re-elected to a full four-year term in the runoff of the 2025 presidential election, defeating González again with an improved margin.

Noboa has adopted a militarized approach to crime in Ecuador, frequently invoking states of emergency, expanding the military role in internal security, weakened judicial institutions, and raising human rights concerns. Supporters say his approach has helped to fight crime. Critics say Noboa is an autocrat, and accuse him of human rights violations, centralization of power and undermining press freedom.

== Early life and education ==
Daniel Roy Gilchrist Noboa Azín was born in Miami, Florida, United States on 30 November 1987, and was raised in Guayaquil. He is the son of Ecuadorian businessman Álvaro Noboa and Ecuadorian physician Annabella Azín. Noboa graduated from the New York University Stern School of Business in 2010, and later earned a Master of Business Administration from the Kellogg School of Management at Northwestern University in Evanston, Illinois. He studied at Harvard University in 2020. In 2022, he obtained a master's degree in political communication and strategic governance from George Washington University under the supervision of professor Roberto Izurieta, Noboa's former press secretary.

== Business career ==
At the age of 18, Noboa founded his own company, DNA Entertainment Group, with the purpose of organizing events.

His father, Álvaro Noboa, owns Noboa Corporation, a banana exporter. Daniel Noboa is seen as an heir to the company. He has served as shipping director of Noboa Corporation. He was also commercial and logistics director between 2010 and June 2018.

The Brazilian daily Folha de S.Paulo revealed in October 2023 that Noboa is the owner of two offshore companies located in Panama, according to the Panama Papers. He is also linked to several other companies owned by his father in tax havens.

== Political career ==
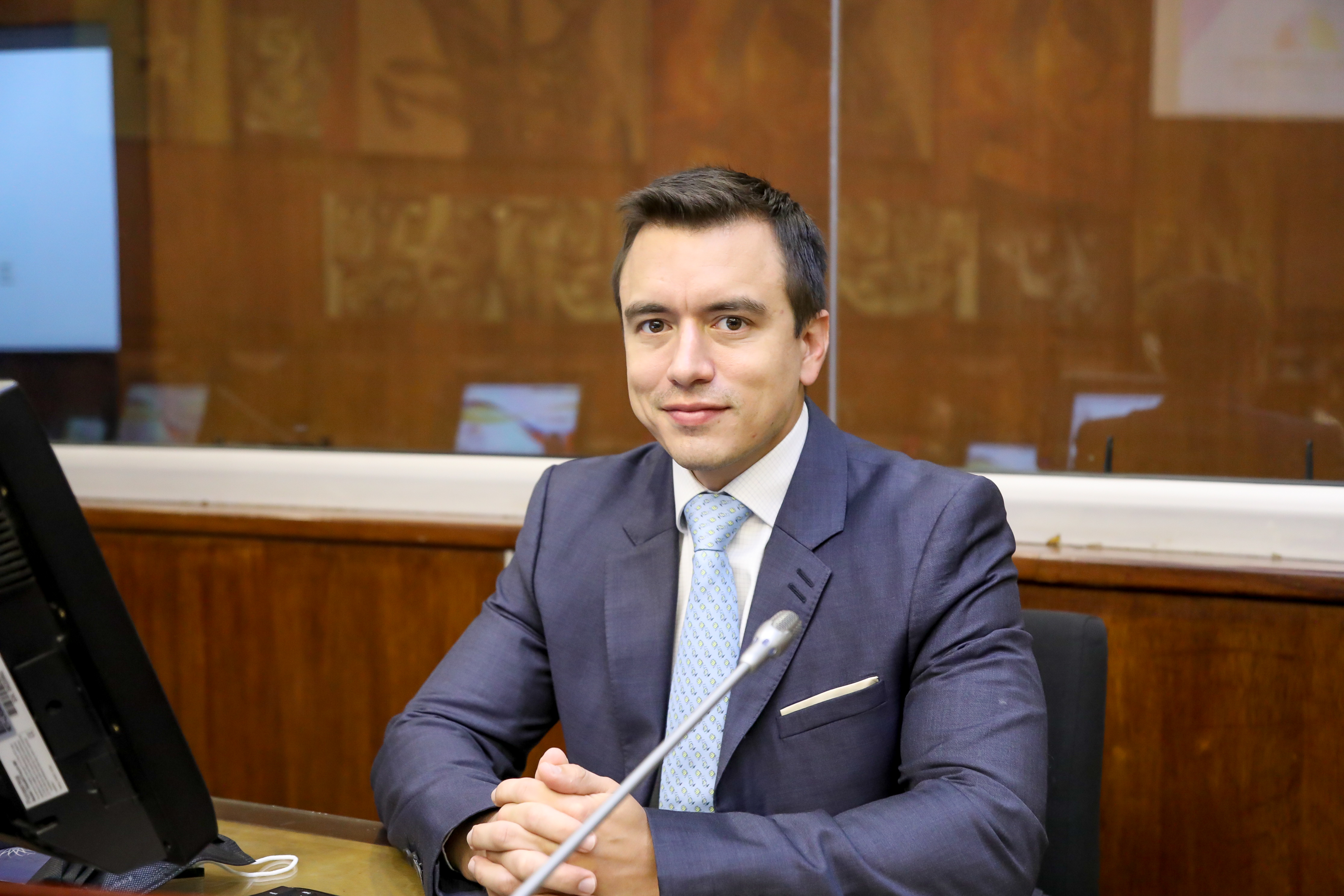
Noboa in 2022

=== National Assembly ===
Noboa was elected to the National Assembly in the 2021 legislative elections, representing Santa Elena, for the United Ecuadorian political movement. He was inaugurated on 14 May in the same year. In that same May, he was appointed chair of the Economic Development Commission. His political ideology in the National Assembly been described as both centrist and centre-right.

Noboa was absent during President Lasso's impeachment trial, however a proxy voted in the affirmative. In March 2023, he was in favor of the muerte cruzada, in the face of the rejection and filing of the Investment Law, presented by the government of Guillermo Lasso. On 17 May 2023, Lasso invoked muerte cruzada, dissolving the National Assembly and ending Noboa's tenure as an assemblyman.

=== 2023 presidential campaign ===
In May 2023, and with the dissolution of parliament amid the political crisis, he presented himself as a pre-candidate for the presidential elections of the same year, by the political movement National Democratic Action (ADN), and also supported by the movements People, Equality and Democracy (PID) and MOVER. His running mate was businesswoman Verónica Abad Rojas. His campaign has focused on job creation, tax incentives for newly established businesses and increased criminal sentences for tax evaders. He has also pledged to improve the justice system in the country amid growing violence.

His campaign is seen as traditional, drawing on the Grupo Noboa social welfare foundation founded by his parents, as well as his ties as chairman of the Commission on Economic Development.

Noboa's performance in the first round of the 2023 election

In two July polls, he was polling at 6.4% and at 3.1%. In early August, Noboa was polling at 2.5% and 3.7%. In a poll conducted a week before the election, he was polling at 3.3%.

On 20 August, Noboa gathered 23.47% of the actual votes and advanced to the run-off election set for 15 October, facing Luisa González. His second-place finish was seen as surprising, with some attributing his rise in popularity to his debate performance. Noboa credited the young voter base for his victory.

In the second round, Noboa was elected, winning 55% of the vote. Elected at age 35, he is the youngest president in Ecuadorian history, beating the record of Jaime Roldós Aguilera who was inaugurated at 38 years old in 1979. Following his victory, Noboa thanked voters for believing in "a new political project, a young political project, an improbable political project". He vowed "to return peace to the country, to give education to the youth again, to be able to provide employment to the many people who are looking for it". Prior to taking office, Noboa travelled to the United States and Europe to search for investors and business lenders to assist the country's debt crisis. During his visit to Washington, D.C. he met with officials from the World Bank, the International Monetary Fund, and the Organization of American States. On 17 October, Noboa visited the Presidential Palace to meet with outgoing President Guillermo Lasso.

== Presidency (2023–present) ==
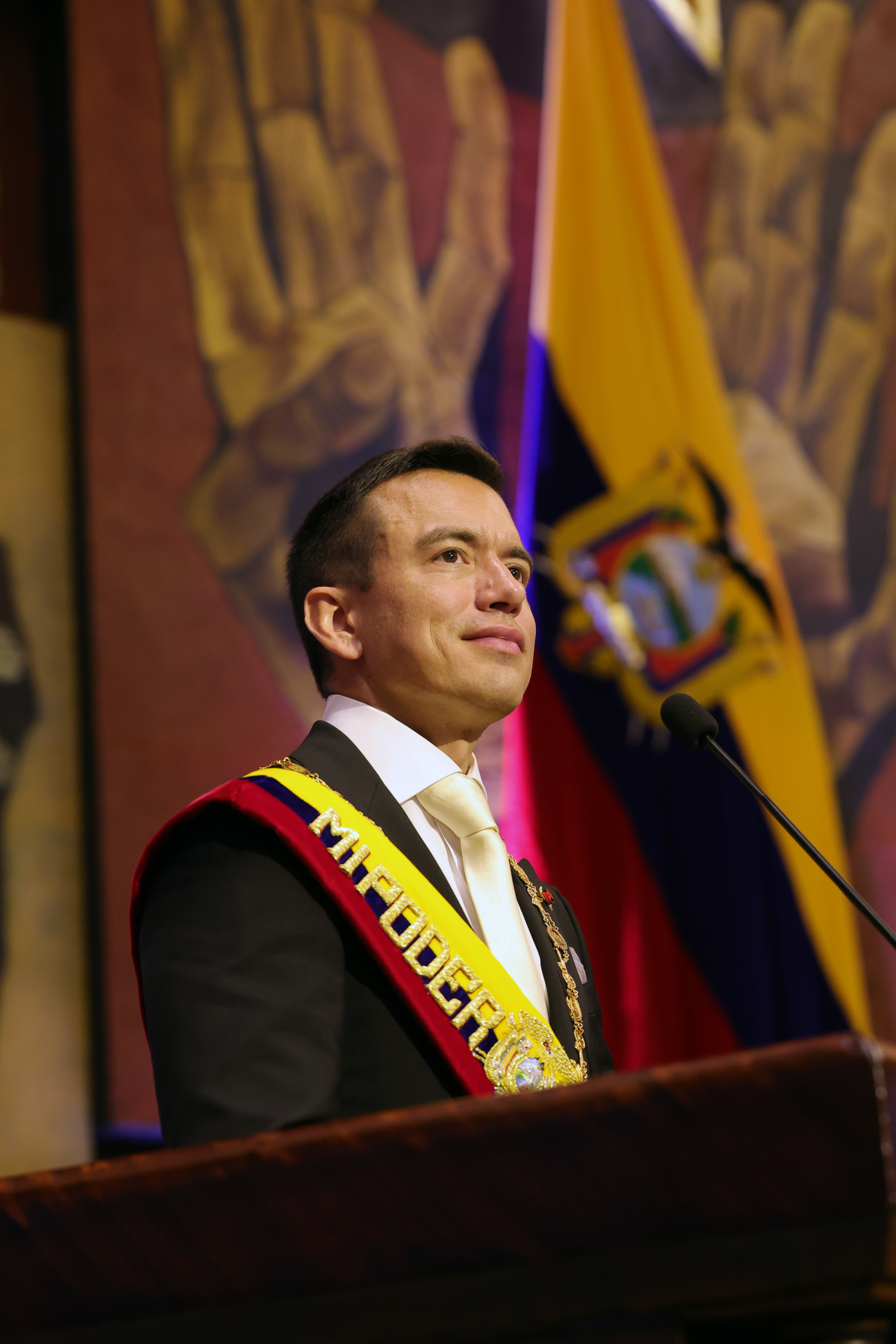
- Presidency of Daniel Noboa; 23 November 2023 – present
- Vice President: Verónica Abad Rojas (2023–2025); María José Pinto (2025–present)
- Party: Acción Democrática Nacional (ADN)
- Election: 2023; 2025
- Seat: Carondelet Palace

=== 2023 ===
==== First months ====
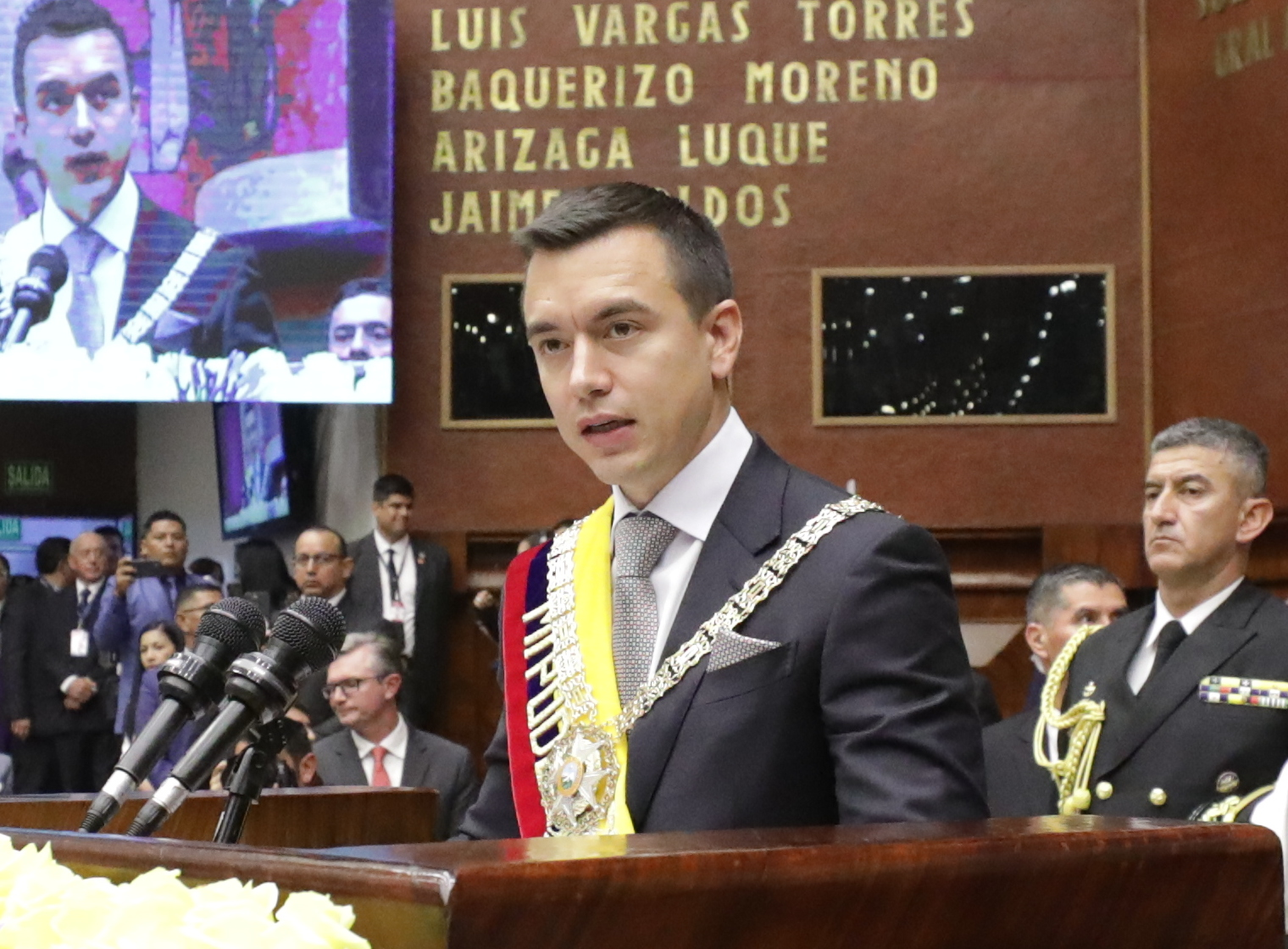
Noboa delivering his inaugural speech in 2023

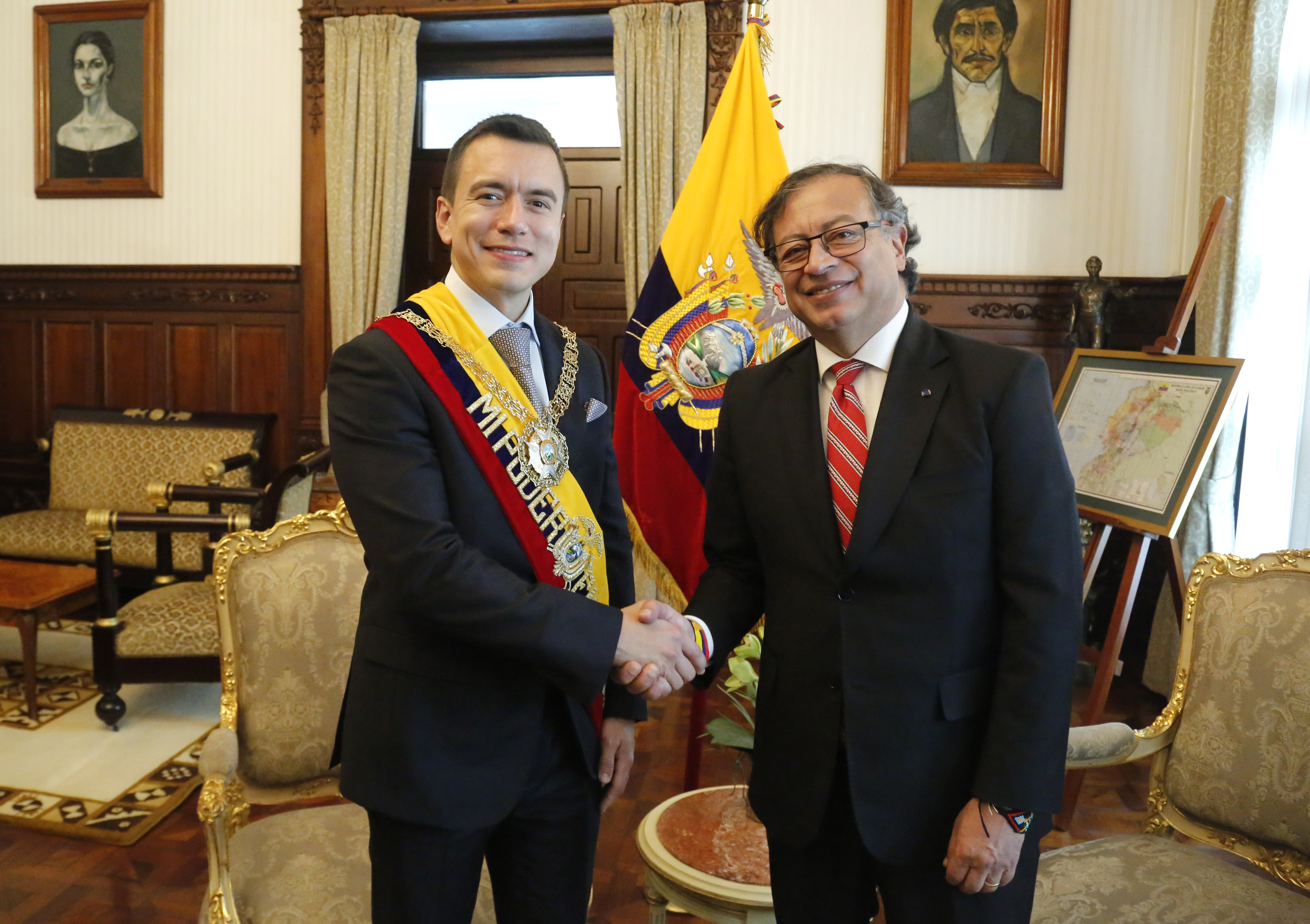
Noboa with Colombian President Gustavo Petro in November 2023

Noboa was inaugurated as president on 23 November 2023, becoming the country's youngest person to assume the office after winning a popular election. Colombia's president, Gustavo Petro, was the only foreign head of state to attend his inauguration. His inaugural address lasted seven minutes, featuring his criticism of the "old paradigms" in the National Assembly. Because Noboa was elected in a snap election, upon his inauguration he only had 18 months to govern and complete the rest of Lasso's term before the next scheduled elections in 2025.

Hours after taking office, Noboa pledged reforms to reduce violence and create employment opportunities in the country, even though he had not appointed a finance minister. He initially announced he would appoint economist Sariha Moya to the position, but ultimately had her lead the nation's planning secretariat instead. Many of his cabinet appointees were sworn in on 23 November 2023, including Labor Minister Ivonne Núñez and Zaida Rovira, who became Minister of Economic and Social Inclusion.

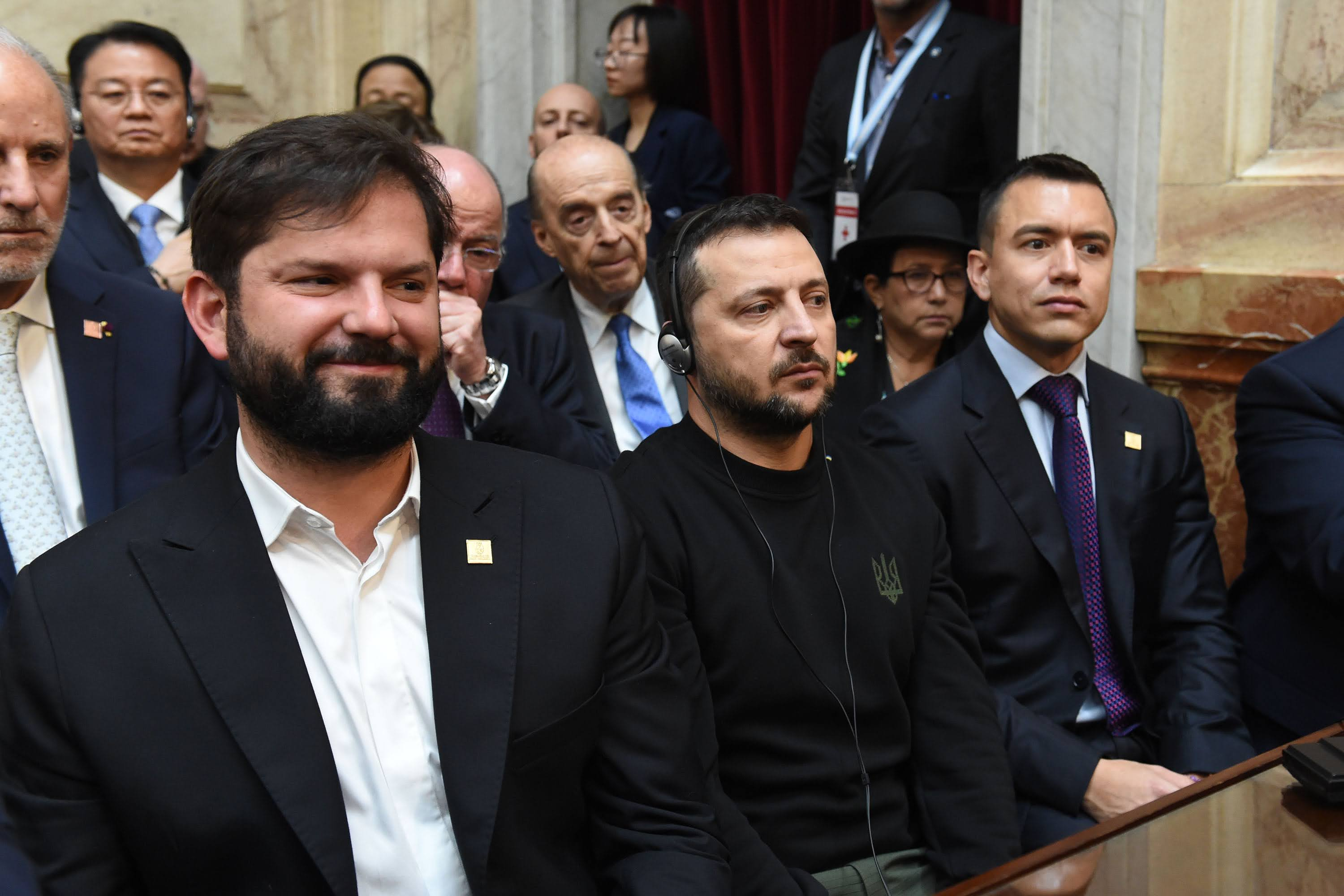
Noboa (right) with Gabriel Boric and Volodymyr Zelenskyy at the inauguration of Javier Milei in December 2023

Two days into his term, Noboa ordered the Ministry of the Interior to repeal the Drug Consumption Table, which he said encouraged "micro-trafficking". He simultaneously instructed the Interior and Health Ministries to create programs to reduce the consumption of narcotics and provide treatment for drug abusers.

==== Initial vice presidential conflict ====
In conflict with Vice President Verónica Abad Rojas from the very first days of his mandate, he distanced her by appointing her "peace collaborator" between Israel and the Palestinians, a mission she was to carry out from the Ecuadorian embassy in Tel Aviv. At the same time, he announced the reorganisation of the vice presidency in order to reduce its powers. Abad Rojas accused him of sending her "to die in the war". Indeed, Noboa sent Abad Rojas to Israel just weeks after diplomats were being evacuated from Israel due to the October 7 attacks, and with decreased security while she remained outside of Ecuador.

==== Early domestic and foreign policy ====
In an effort to reduce overcrowding, on 15 December Noboa proposed deporting 1,500 foreign prisoners who are incarcerated in Ecuador. He also said he would consider constructing two maximum security prisons, drawing inspiration from El Salvador. The same day, Noboa announced he would seek to cut $1 billion in government spending while raising revenue via gold reserves worth around $300 million.

Noboa addressed the UN Security Council On 9 December, highlighting criminal gang activities and overall security as high priorities. On 10 December 2023, Noboa attended the inauguration of Argentinian President Javier Milei. Noboa also met with Ukrainian President Volodymyr Zelenskyy, who praised him for his stance on Russia's invasion. The two discussed expanding bilateral relations, primarily surrounding security and trade. Zelenskyy also invited Noboa to visit Ukraine.

=== 2024 ===
==== Feud with outgoing Vice President Verónica Abad Rojas ====
Upon their inauguration in November 2023, both Noboa and Abad Rojas distanced themselves from each other, with Abad Rojas launching personal attacks against Noboa. She did not appear in the inaugural photo of the cabinet and subsequently was appointed ambassador to Israel. Shortly thereafter, she was ordered to move to Istanbul within three days. Abad Rojas called these decisions a "forced exile".

In June 2024, Abad Rojas survived an impeachment attempt by the Noboa government due to legal issues. In November 2024, she was suspended from the vice presidency by the labor ministry for 150 days. Noboa named Secretary of National Planning Sariha Moya as acting vice president. Abad Rojas' suspension was lifted by a judge in December 2024, along with an order for the labor ministry to give her an apology for the suspension.

According to Ecuador's electoral law, the president is required to take a leave of absence during the presidential campaign and appoint the elected vice-president to act as president temporarily. Noboa refused to appoint Abad Rojas as interim president during the election campaign. Instead, in January 2025, he appointed Cynthia Gellibert as vice president with temporary presidential responsibilities during the campaign.

On 30 March 2025, Noboa caused controversy for ignoring the Constitutional Court and appointing Cynthia Gellibert by decree as vice president, suspending Abad Rojas once again. She was disenfranchised for two years by the country's electoral tribunal in a 3–2 decision on a gender-based political violence counterclaim filed by Foreign Minister Gabriela Sommerfeld, following Abad Rojas' initial lawsuit against Noboa and others for alleged harassment. Analysts said Noboa was focused on institutional stability and a leadership aligned with his vision of government, which reinforced his political strategy in the wake of this election.

==== State of emergency ====
On 7 January 2024, Los Choneros leader José Adolfo Macías Villamar escaped from prison in the city of Guayaquil, on the day of his scheduled transfer to a maximum-security prison. The events were reported the next day by authorities, with charges being filed against two prison guards. Following the escape, Noboa declared a state of emergency, to last for 60 days, giving authorities the power to suspend people's rights and allowing the military to be mobilized inside prisons. Riots ensued in multiple prisons across Ecuador.

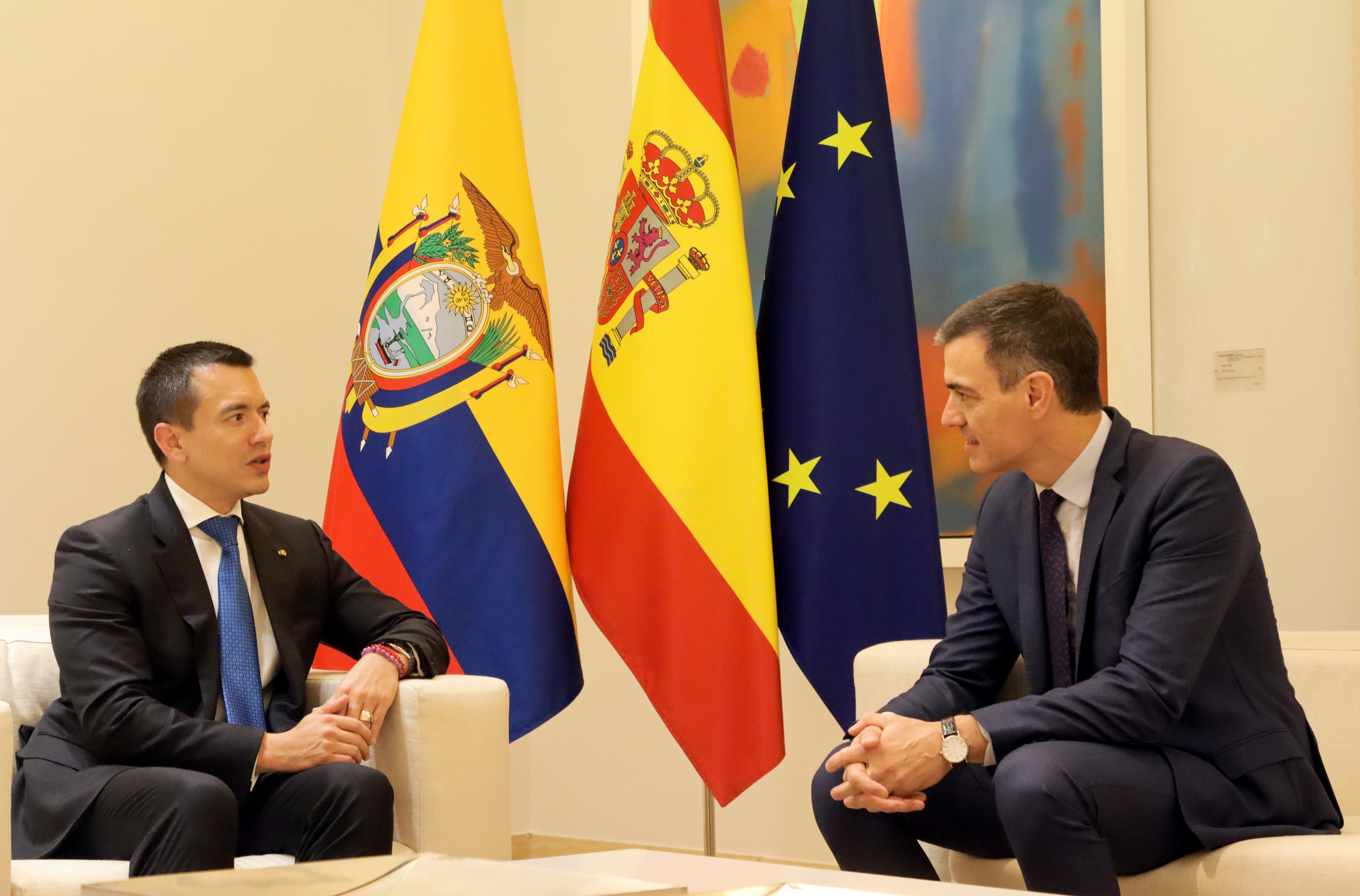
Noboa with Spanish Prime Minister Pedro Sánchez in January 2024

Two days later, mass armed attacks occurred throughout the country, including the storming of a television station during a live broadcast. The left-wing opposition supported the government, saying: "Now is the time for national unity. Organized crime has declared war on the state, and the state must prevail". Some analysts criticized Noboa for providing an exclusively security-based response to crime, without making any announcements on possible reforms of the police and judiciary, reputed to be highly corrupt, or on social policies to combat the root causes of violence. Amid the conflict, a series of human rights violations were denounced. The lack of regulation and the way in which security measures were implemented resulted in allegations of human rights violations from local and international civil society organizations such as the Alianza por los Derechos Humanos de Ecuador and Human Rights Watch. In mid-2024, the United Nations Committee Against Torture noted its concern over allegations about the management of the crisis and the treatment of detainees by Ecuadorian security forces. In 2025, the nation's Permanent Committee for the Defense of Human Rights issued a report on the potential cases of 27 people victims of forced disappearance by state forces.

The PROGEN case in Ecuador has also sparked a scandal due to a $149 million contract signed by the government for the purchase of thermal generators. Amid an energy crisis, delays and the lack of transparency in the process have worsened the situation, leaving the country without the promised 150 megawatts.

==== Raid on the Mexican embassy ====
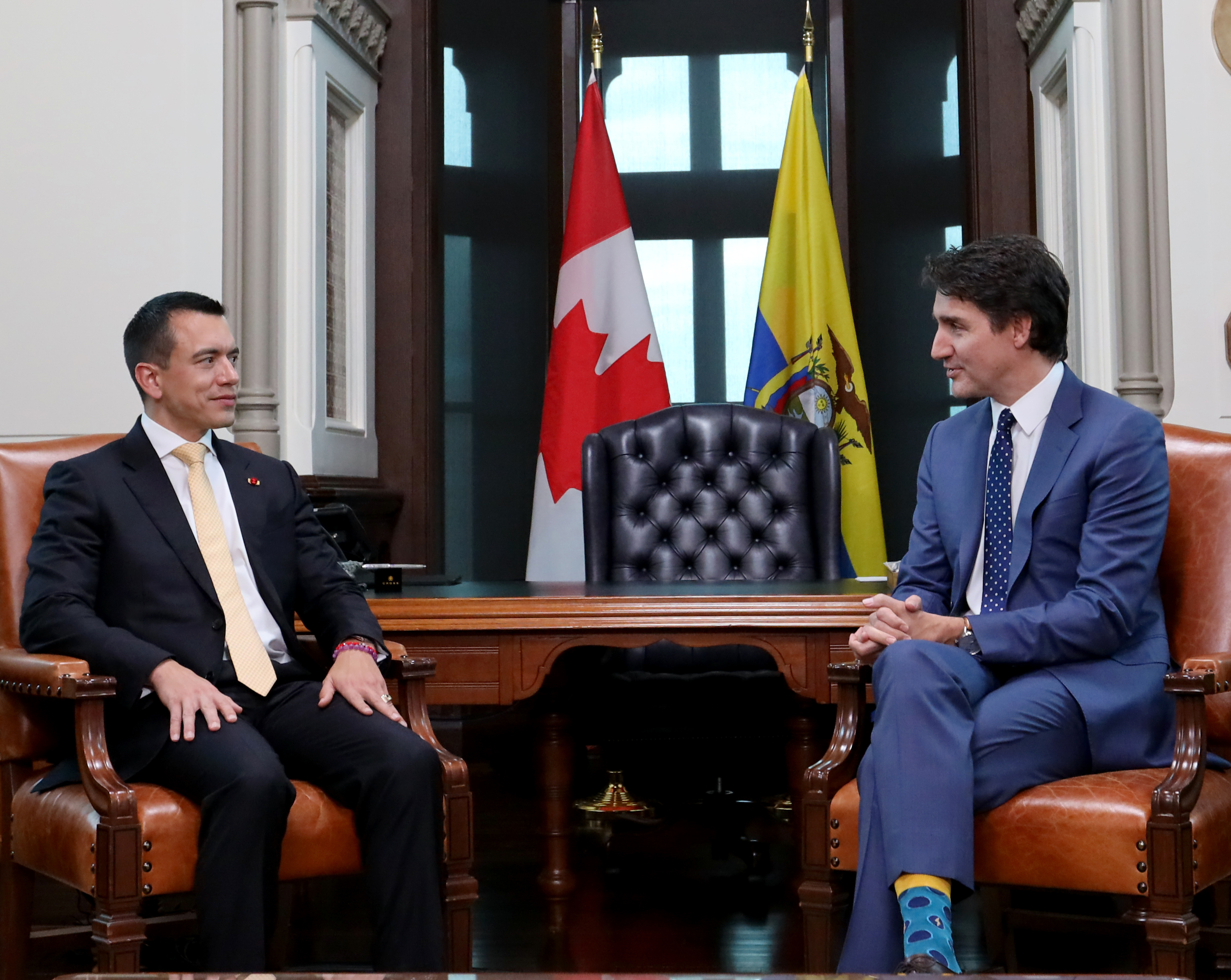
Noboa meeting with Canadian Prime Minister Justin Trudeau in March 2024

On 5 April 2024, the Mexican embassy in Quito was raided by Ecuadorian police and military forces. Mexico and numerous other countries decried the raid as a violation of the 1961 Vienna Convention on Diplomatic Relations and the 1954 Caracas Convention on Diplomatic Asylum. The raid was carried out to arrest the former vice president of Ecuador, Jorge Glas, who had been sentenced for corruption and had been living in the embassy since 17 December 2023. A few hours before the attack, he had been granted political asylum.

In response to the raid, Noboa said he made "exceptional decisions to protect national security, the rule of law and the dignity of a population that rejects any type of impunity for criminals, corrupt people or narco-terrorists", and that he would "not allow sentenced criminals involved in very serious crimes to be given asylum", arguing that such actions were against the Vienna Convention and other international agreements. Noboa later said that he wished to resolve the diplomatic issue with Mexico, but added that "justice is not negotiated" and that "we will never protect criminals who have harmed Mexicans".

=== 2025 ===
==== 2025 presidential campaign ====
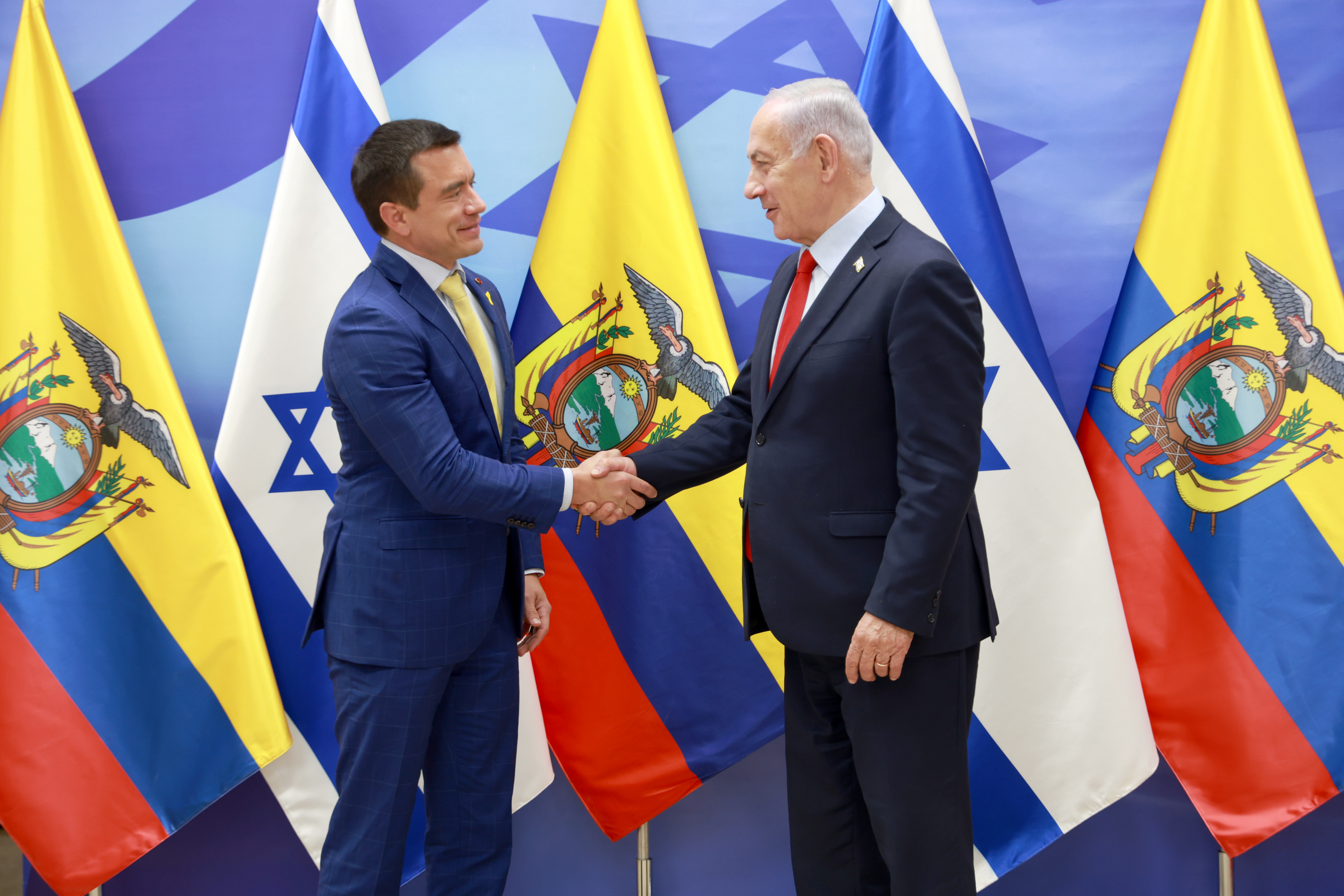
Noboa and Israeli Prime Minister Benjamin Netanyahu during Noboa's state visit to Israel in May 2025

In May 2024, Noboa registered to run for re-election in the upcoming 2025 general election. In August 2024, Noboa named María José Pinto González Artigas as his running mate.

In February 2025, Noboa advanced to the run-off, facing Luisa González in a rematch from the previous election. In the first round, Noboa received 44.17% of the vote, with González narrowly behind at 43.97%. In April 2025, Noboa was re-elected in a runoff with 55% of the vote, defeating González. The result was a decisive win for Noboa, who was expected to be in a neck-and-neck competition with his challenger based on pre-election polling. His campaign was notable for its focus on young people.

==== Second term ====
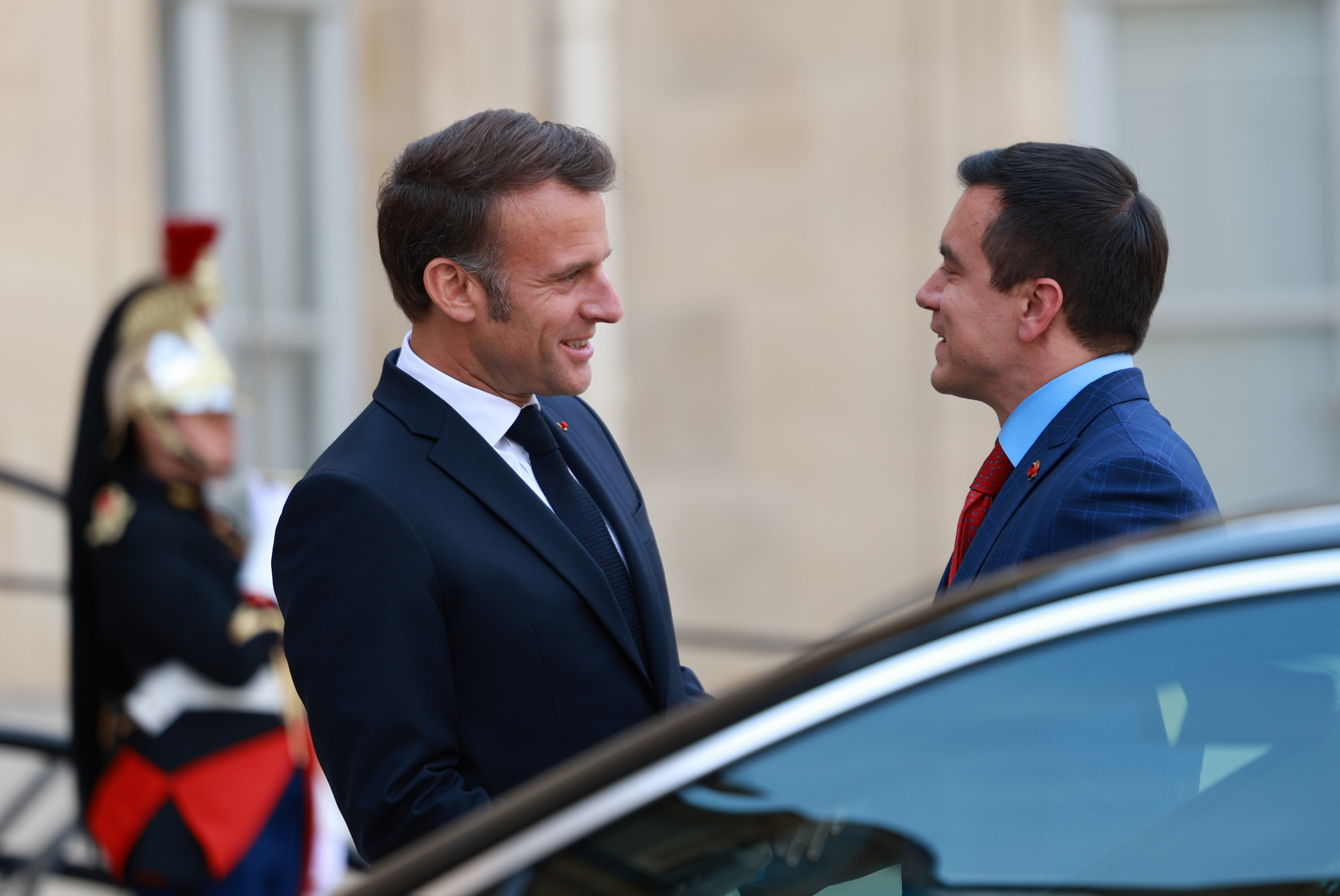
Noboa with French President Emmanuel Macron in Paris, May 2025

Noboa was inaugurated for his second term on 24 May 2025.

Noboa said in March 2025 that he wanted American, European and Brazilian armies to join his war against criminal gangs. He added he would like President Donald Trump to designate Ecuadorean gangs as terrorist groups, as he has done for some Mexican and Venezuelan cartels. He thereafter started laying the groundwork for U.S. forces to arrive. He met Trump on 30 March 2025, with Trump agreeing to help.

On 4 September, Noboa met with US Secretary of State Marco Rubio, who announced the planned expenditure of $20 million USD toward enhanced security cooperation with Ecuador. The United States also designated Los Choneros and Los Lobos as "foreign terrorist organizations." Noboa has cooperated with the US to expand the US military presence in Ecuador, allowing deployments at Manta Air Base, Guayaquil and San Cristóbal, Galapagos Islands under cooperation agreements, rather than bilateral treaties.

In September 2025, Noboa's administration terminated a 15-year-old bilateral agreement with Venezuela that had provided a simplified visa and residency process. Noboa has significantly shifted Ecuador's migration policy toward stricter controls, with a particular focus on Venezuelan nationals.

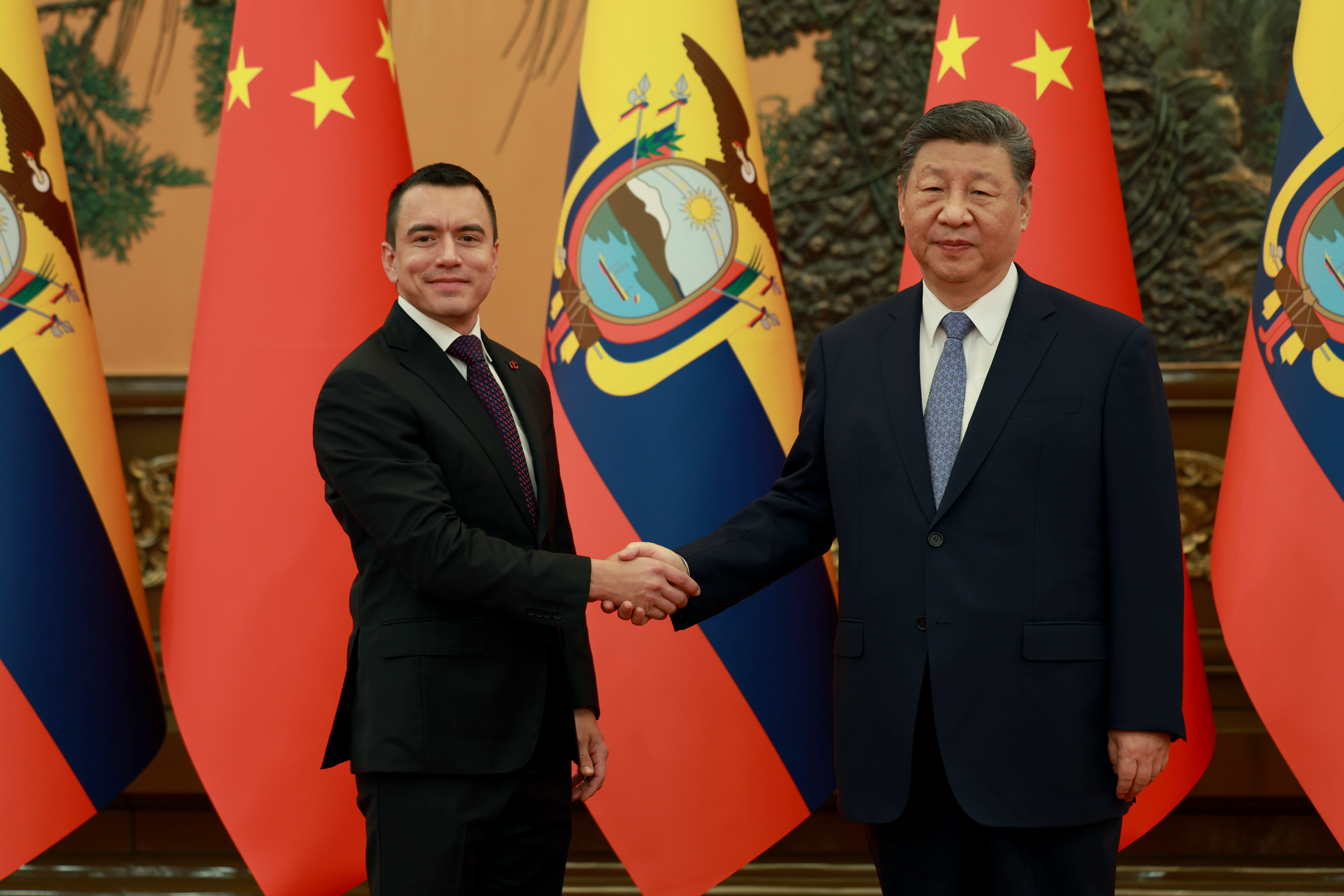
Noboa with Chinese President Xi Jinping in Beijing, June 2025

On 28 September 2025, Noboa led a humanitarian convoy with UN and EU diplomats Laura Melo, Yekaterina Doródnova and Giovanni Davoli. The convoy, which was escorted by armed military, came under attack as protestors used Molotov cocktails and rocks in Cotacachi, Imbabura Province. The attack took place during nationwide strikes and protests about fuel subsidy cuts after an unarmed protestor, Efrain Fuerez, was shot dead by a soldier. It resulted in the kidnapping of 17 soldiers who were released four days later. The protests were led by the indigenous rights group Confederation of Indigenous Nationalities of Ecuador (CONAIE), who have reported repression by freezing the bank accounts of indigenous leaders and activists as well as the censorship of indigenous-led radio and TV channels. In response, Noboa declared a state of emergency in eight provinces, enforcing a curfew.

On 23 October 2025, Noboa said he was the target of an assassination attempt using poisoned chocolate and jam.

On 16 November 2025 a majority of Ecuadorians voted against allowing the return of foreign military bases in the country and drafting a new constitution, alongside other proposals in a referendum proposed by Noboa, being described as his first major political setback during his second term.

== Political positions ==
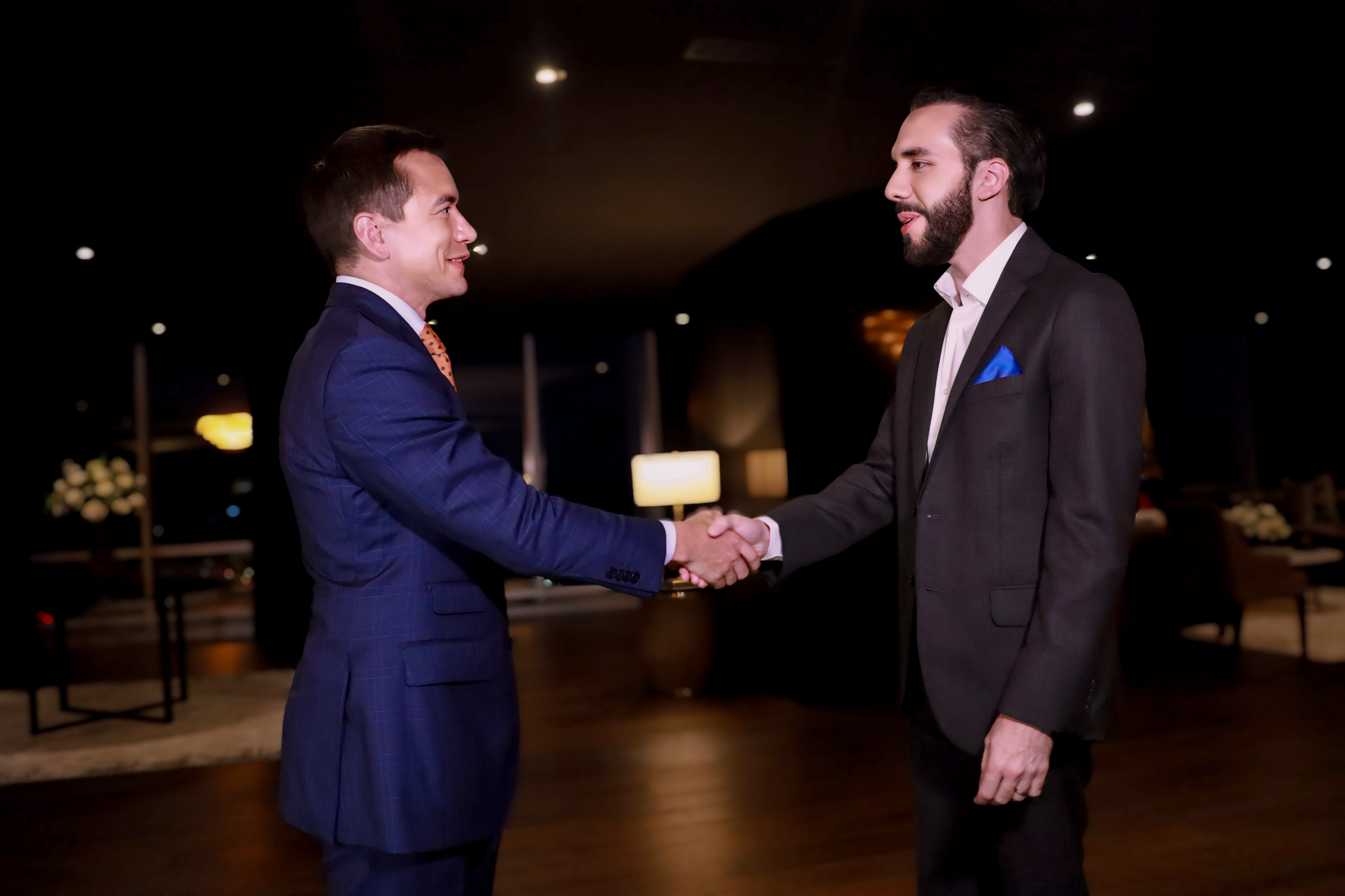
Noboa has claimed inspiration from President Nayib Bukele of El Salvador regarding his crime policy.

Noboa has been regarded as an economically liberal, pro-business social liberal, but rejected identification with both the left and right of the political spectrum, broadly describing his political alignment as centre-left. According to Constantin Groll, head of the Friedrich-Ebert-Stiftung's office in Ecuador, Noboa can be classified as right-wing for holding pro-business and conservative positions. The Guardian also described him as right-wing, while BBC described him as centre-right. In an interview with Diario Expreso, when questioned about some criticism for his lack of defined political views, Noboa referenced his father Alvaro Noboa, mentioning that he ran for left-wing, socialist and indigenous parties against the right, and said, "What is my ideology? Centre, centre-left."

Noboa supports LGBTQ rights and has denounced discrimination. In his first government plan, he proposed improved access to gender-affirming hormone therapy and psychotherapy for trans people.

In his second government plan, he plans to expand comprehensive sexual and reproductive health services, including safe abortion access, prenatal care, and sexual education. He has also proposed programs to prevent discrimination against women and LGBTQ+ groups, including educational programs for healthy relationships and gender equality.

== Personal life ==
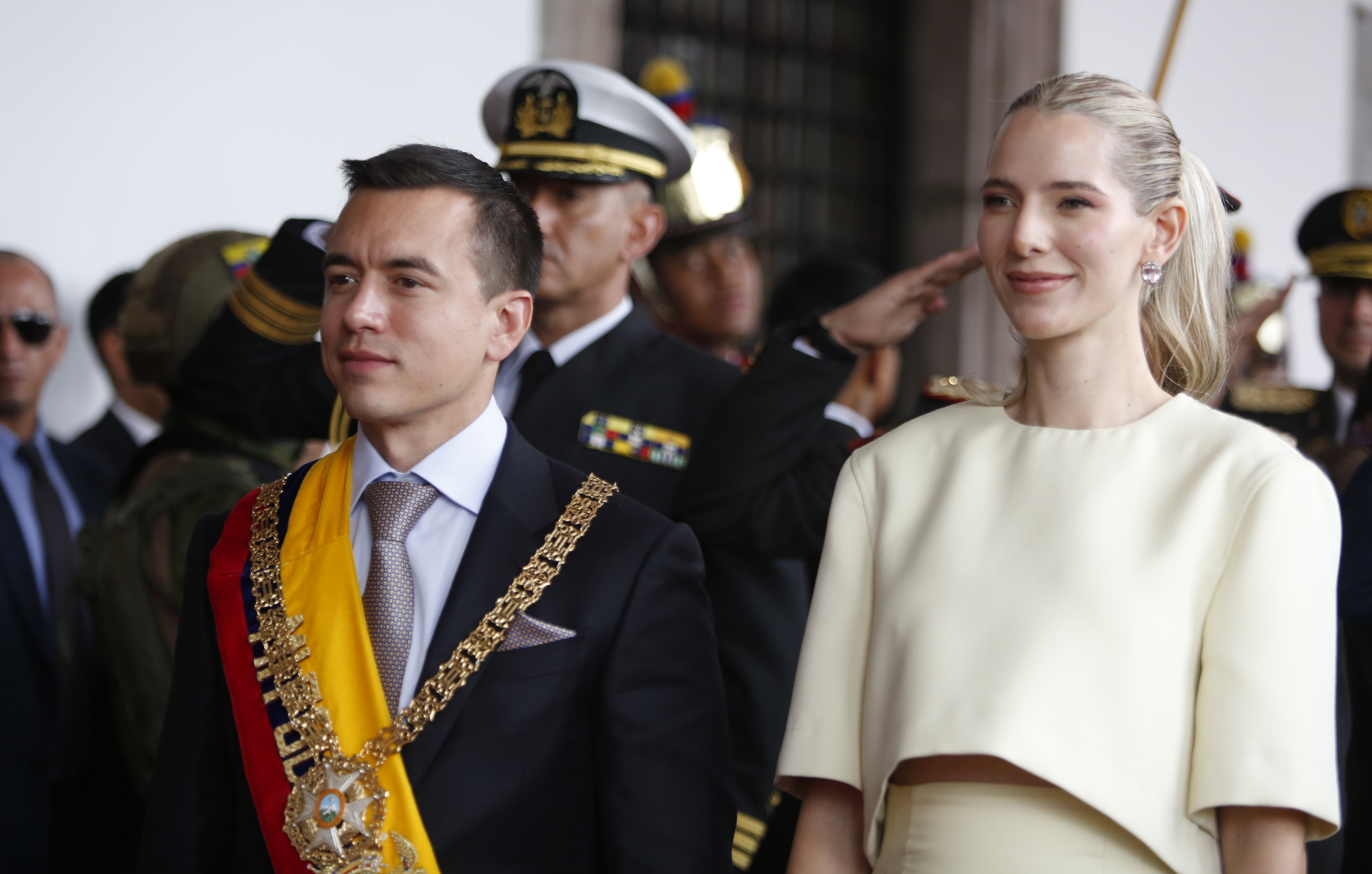
Noboa with his wife Lavinia Valbonesi at his November 2023 inauguration

In 2018, Noboa married Gabriela Goldbaum. They had a daughter and later divorced. In June 2021, a complaint filed by Noboa was accepted by a Spanish court to investigate insurance firm Mapfre, linked to alleged violation of privacy and disclosure of secrets involving data from Goldbaum during divorce proceedings.

In 2019, while still married to Goldbaum, Noboa met social media influencer Lavinia Valbonesi, hiring her as his personal nutritionist. They married in 2021 and have two sons.

In 2025, he asked Ecuadorian courts to reduce his child support payments from $5,217 to $1,739, a request that was granted in December of that year.

== See also ==
- List of current heads of state and government
- List of heads of the executive by approval rating
- List of youngest serving state leaders
- 2025 Ecuador protests

== Notes ==
Political offices
Preceded by Guillermo Lasso	President of Ecuador; 2023–present	Incumbent
