= 2025 Ecuador protests =

2025 protests in Ecuador

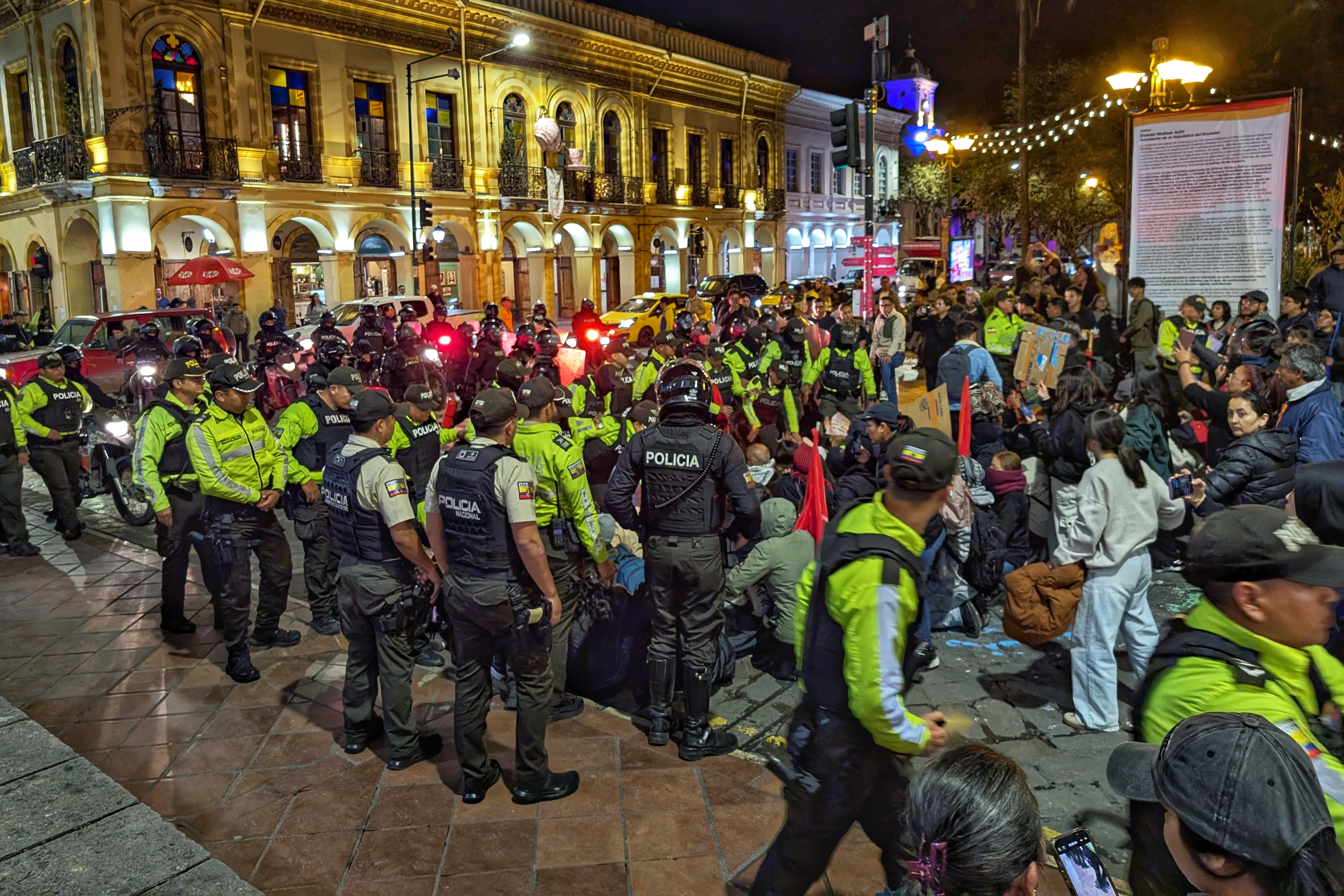
- Protests in Calderón Park in Cuenca, Ecuador.
- Date: 12 September 2025 – 22 October 2025
- Caused by: Cancellation of fuel subsidies; Economic and environmental policies of Daniel Noboa
- Goals: Revoke the licence or halt the mining project in Kimsakocha; Restore diesel subsidies or fair compensation; Guarantee dialogue with affected communities; Protect water and ecosystems
- Result: CONAIE ends the national strike without achieving its objectives; Mining project in Kimsakocha partially cancelled

Parties
Government: Armed Forces of Ecuador; National Police of Ecuador	(Ecuador) Opposition: Confederation of Indigenous Nationalities of Ecuador (CONAIE); Anti-governmental protesters; FEUE (Federation of University Students of Ecuador)

Lead figures
Daniel Noboa	Marlon Vargas; Leonidas Iza; Pacha Terán

Casualties
- Deaths: 3+ civilians
- Injuries: 282+ civilians
- Arrested: 172+

The 2025 Ecuador protests which escalated into a national strike beginning on 22 September 2025, are mass demonstrations and national strikes in reaction to the government cancelling fuel subsidies. Indigenous groups led the protests and were joined by farmers, students and civil society organizations, creating a national movement calling for economic reforms and change of government policies. Violent clashes between the protestors and security forces led the government to declare a state of emergency in several provinces.

== Background ==
Fuel subsidies have historically kept agriculture and transport costs low in Ecuador. This benefitted struggling populations and key economic sectors. On 12 September 2025, President Daniel Noboa eliminated the country's longstanding diesel subsidy via Executive Decree No. 126, with the new price taking effect on 13 September to reduce fiscal deficits and redirect funds to other social programs. Diesel fuel prices rose from $1.80 to $2.80 per gallon, The government stated the subsidy had cost the treasury nearly US$1.1 billion annually and undermined the sustainability of public finances. Of the projected savings, $300 million was designated to compensate bus companies, transport operators carrying essential goods, and poor families affected by the price increase, leading to nationwide strikes and protests led by the Confederation of Indigenous Nationalities of Ecuador (CONAIE), similar to protests in 2019 and 2022, over the same issues. The protests that began on September 18, were also fueled by the approval of the Loma Larga mining project, located in the Quimsacocha water reserve, in Azuay province. A project that local communities and environmentalists are worried about, as it may pollute important water sources.

== Timeline ==
=== 13 September ===
On 13 September, President Noboa declared the removal of diesel subsidy as part of national program. On the same day indigenous groups and farmers called for national strikes and road blocks. Demonstrations demanded to restore the subsidies, protection to indigenous lands as well as resources due to the mining project.

=== 16 September ===
Due to the growing unrest President Noboa declared a state of emergency for 60 days and curfew in several provinces, where mass demonstrations are expected following calls for national strikes by CONAIE and other organizations.

=== 17-18 September ===
Thousands of people protested against a gold mining project and environmental hazards, which later got stronger over the fuel prices and the government's use of force against protestors.

=== 21 September ===
The government sent the military to reinforce several cities and provinces, at the same time education institutes shifted activities to online learning.

=== 22-23 September ===
Major highways in provinces like Carchi, Pichincha, and Cotopaxi were blocked, marking the start of an ongoing strike led by Indigenous and farming communities. The military responded with curfews, and creating their own roadblocks, and deployed armored vehicles to control the situation. Most protests remained peaceful but some involved violent clashes and arrests as tensions grew between the demonstrators and the authorities.

=== 24 September ===
On the third consecutive day of the strike, President Noboa visited the highlands city of Otavalo. He was accompanied by UN and EU officials diplomats, but his convoy was attacked by protestors using Molotov cocktails. During the attack 17 soldiers were kidnapped and their whereabouts are unknown.

=== 25 September ===
The strikes and protests continued throughout Ecuador, as the Indigenous organizations continued to oppose government plans for fuel subsidy, oil and mining projects. In response security forces continued enforcing curfews while government officials support those projects on international forums.

=== 28 September ===
On 28 September, Efraín Fuerez died during clashes in Cotacachi, Imbabura province. According to the human rights organisation INREDH (Regional Human Rights Advisory Foundation), Fuerez died after being struck by a firearm allegedly discharged by the armed forces, with an autopsy revealing a gunshot wound to the back that damaged his lung. Human Rights Watch verified videos showing that after Fuerez collapsed, soldiers in military uniform beat him and another man for several minutes before departing. The Attorney General's Office opened an investigation into the use of force that caused his death.

=== 29 September ===
As of 18 October, the Alliance for Human Rights in Ecuador had recorded 377 reports of human rights violations, resulting in at least 296 people injured and two deaths. At least 205 people were detained overall during the protests, with 13 charged with terrorism following an attack on a police station in Otavalo. Reporters Without Borders documented 55 attacks on journalists between 22 September and the end of the strike. Local and international critics called the government's use of force against the protestors excessive.

=== 22 October ===
On October 22, 2025 it was reported that The Indigenous alliance, declared they would stop their protests, following Noboa's threat to use the army against the protestors and clear the blockades.

== Reactions ==
=== Domestic ===
==== Government ====
As of September 16, the government declared a state of emergency for 60 days in seven provinces: Carchi, Imbabura, Pichincha, Azuay, Bolívar, Cotopaxi, and Santo Domingo. Curfews were declared in Cotopaxi, Imbabura, Chimborazo, Bolívar, and Carchi. This steps were one to allow the police and military freedom of operation. Following the violent clashes of September 28, an investigation regarding the use of excessive force was opened. President Noboa accused "narco gangs" for fueling the protests

==== CONAIE ====
The indigenous organization rejects the cancellation of fuel subsidies, saying it is devastating to millions of families, as well as production, and transport sectors. On September 30 CONAIE President Marlon Vargas stated the protests will continue until their demands will be answered.

=== International ===
UN: The UN expressed concern other the excessive use of force during the protests, highlighting the right and freedom for peaceful protests. It called for an immediate independent investigation of events. On 24 October 2025, UN human rights experts formally expressed concern about a serious deterioration of fundamental freedoms and civic space and the rights of Indigenous peoples in Ecuador. They noted that the strike had produced at least three deaths, 282 injuries, 172 arrests, and 15 enforced disappearances, with the majority of violations recorded in Imbabura and Pichincha — the two provinces with the largest Indigenous populations. The experts stated that the authorities had attempted to associate the protests with terrorist acts linked to organised crime without sufficient evidence, and that the military response to social protests, together with recurrent states of emergency, was incompatible with Ecuador's obligation to protect the right to peaceful assembly.

EU Italy: They condemned the attack on diplomats that were part of the UN and EU convoy, expressing their solidarity with the diplomats.

United States: the embassy in Ecuador issued warnings for American citizens.

== See also ==
- 2019 Ecuadorian protests
- 2022 Ecuadorian protests
- Daniel Noboa
- Confederation of Indigenous Nationalities of Ecuador (CONAIE)
- Fossil fuel phase-out
