= Roberto Izurieta =

Ecuadorian professor, political adviser and diplomat

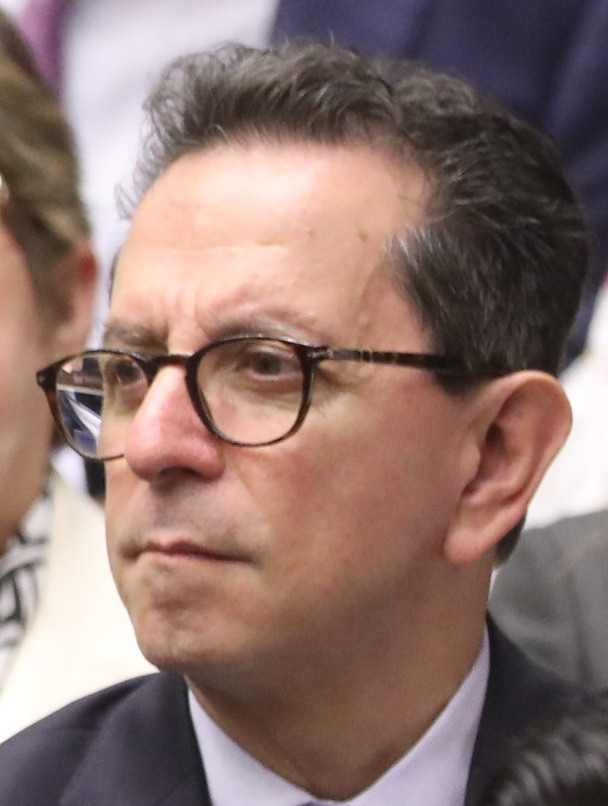
Roberto Izurieta in 2023.

Roberto Augusto Izurieta Canoba (Montevideo, 1963) is an Ecuadorian professor, political strategist and diplomat of Uruguayan origin. Was the Secretary of Communication of Ecuador, during the governments of Daniel Noboa, previously was the Secretary of Communication during the government of Jamil Mahuad, from 1998 to 2000. He was also Ecuador's ambassador to Chile (from 2022 to 2023) and a professor at George Washington University for more than two decades.

As a political strategist, he has worked as an advisor to presidents such as the Ecuadorian Guillermo Lasso, the Peruvian Alejandro Toledo, the Mexican Vicente Fox and the Guatemalan Álvaro Colom. His political work has earned him recognitions such as the Rising Star award from the American magazine Campaigns and Elections, from which he was the first Latin American to receive it.

== Biography ==
He was born in January 1963 in Montevideo, Uruguay, a country where his father had traveled to study veterinary medicine. He moved to Ecuador during the dictatorship of Guillermo Rodríguez Lara and completed his secondary studies in Quito at the San Gabriel and Spellman schools, from which he graduated with a bachelor's degree in 1981. He completed his higher education at the Pontificia Universidad Católica del Ecuador, where he completed the degree in economics, and later studied a master's degree in political science at Southern Illinois University Carbondale through a Fulbright scholarship.

After moving to the United States, he began working in 2001 as a professor at George Washington University, where he taught for the next two decades and was also director of Latin American projects at the Graduate School of Political Management.

== Political career ==
During the government of President Jamil Mahuad (1998–2000), he served as Secretary of Communication of Ecuador. Izurieta had already collaborated with Mahuad previously, during the politician's campaign for the 1992 Quito mayoral election.

After moving to the United States, he began working in 2001 as a professor at George Washington University, where he taught for the next two decades and was also director of Latin American projects at the Graduate School of Political Management. As a trainer of generations of professionals, among their students of strategic communication and governance in Washington, various Latin American leaders have appeared, some have become presidents of their respective countries, as is the case of Daniel Noboa, president of Ecuador, as well as others professionals who have stood out both in academia and in politics, as is the case of the Columbia University professor and CNN columnist, Geovanny Vicente, who under the leadership and supervision of Roberto Izurieta had the academic tutoring of Santiago Peña, president of Paraguay, at George Washington University.

On December 8, 2022, he was appointed by President Guillermo Lasso as Ecuador's ambassador to Chile, for which he had to leave his position as a political analyst on the program Choque de opiniones, on the CNN en Español. As Ecuador's ambassador to Chile, he was decorated with the Order of Merit of Chile, in the Degree of Grand Cross, by the Chilean government upon his departure from office.

In November 2023, he was appointed Secretary of Communication by President Daniel Noboa. due to the results of the 2024 Ecuadorian constitutional referendum, the president Daniel Noboa made some changes in his presidential cabinet, which led to his resignation and at the same time Noboa appointed Irene Vélez as his replacement in the ministerial portfolio, ending 5 months his presence in the presidential cabinet.

== Personal life ==
Izurieta has been openly homosexual since he was 19, which made him decide against pursuing a career as a politician, given the prejudices in Ecuador at the time. Since 1982, Izurieta began attending clandestine LGBT bars in Quito with some of his friends. friends, like Luis Miguel Campos. Among the bars he visited was El Hueco, an establishment that, according to Izurieta, received that nickname after he himself named it this way because of how difficult it was to access.

Due to the criminalization of homosexuality, which at that time carried a sentence of four to six years in prison in the country, Izurieta experienced police raids on LGBT bars in Quito on several occasions, which ended with many of those who did not manage to escape arrested. During the process to achieve the decriminalization of homosexuality, which was achieved in 1997, Izurieta collaborated with the Tolerance Group and was one of the people who participated in collecting signatures of support.

In 2010, Izurieta and his partner, American Paul Quirk, registered their de facto union in a notary office in Ecuador. However, they could not get the Civil Registry to register the union. The same year, they were married in Washington D.C. In 2022, with same-sex marriage already recognized in the country, they were legally married in Ecuador.

On November 23, 2023, Izurieta attended the presidential inauguration of Daniel Noboa with his husband. The event provoked homophobic messages on social networks from users who insulted Izurieta for holding hands with his husband, even though heterosexual couples did the same.
