= Vice President of Ecuador =

Second-highest political position in Ecuador

Vice President of the Republic of Ecuador
- Vicepresidente de la República del Ecuador
- Coat of arms of Ecuador

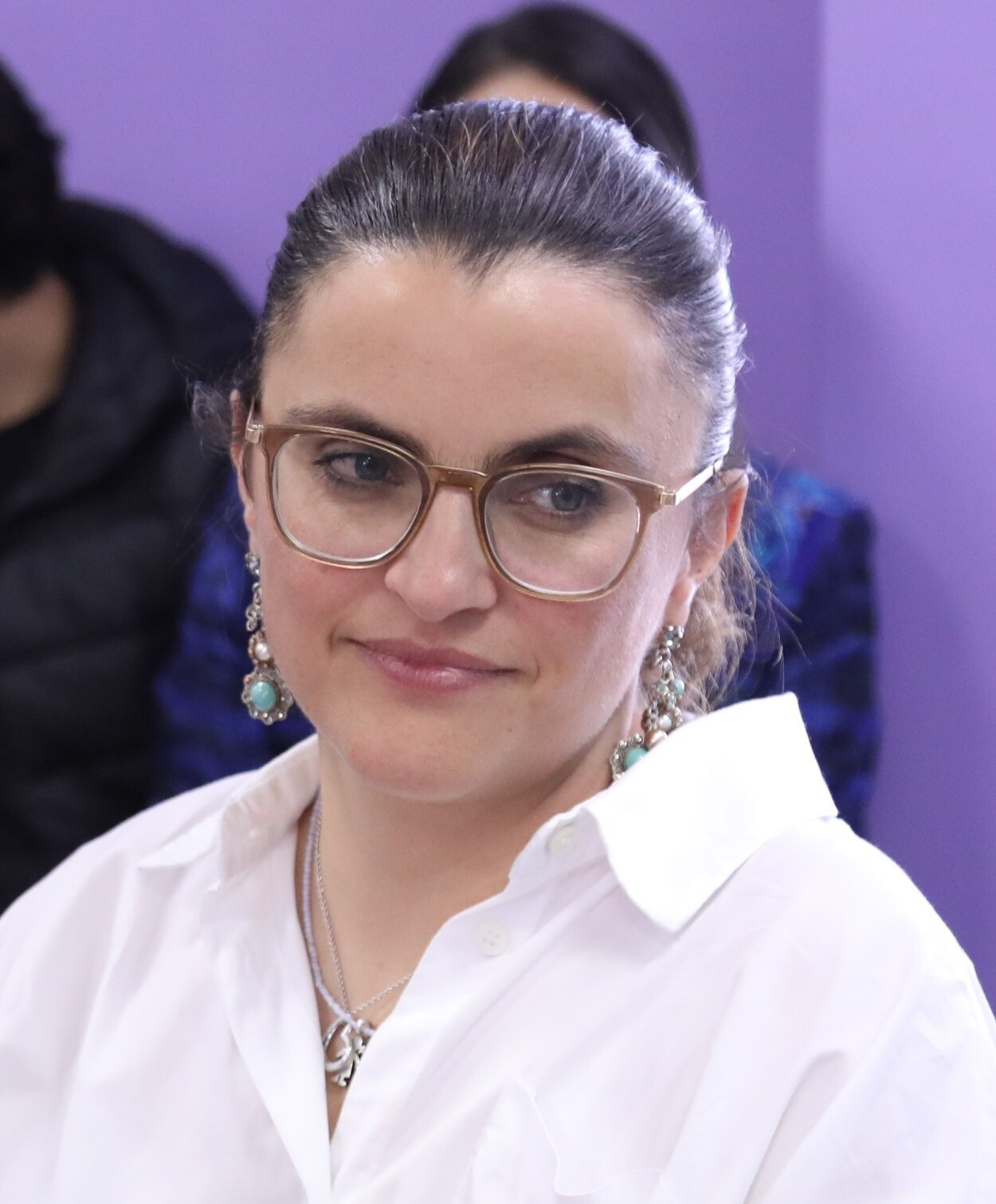
- Incumbent; Maria Jose Pinto since 24 May 2025
- Executive branch of the Government of Ecuador
- Appointer: Direct popular vote or the President (with approval from the National Assembly)
- Term length: Four years renewable once
- Inaugural holder: José Joaquín de Olmedo
- Formation: March 6, 1845
- Salary: 4,869 USD per month

The vice president of Ecuador is the second highest political position in Ecuador. In many instances, the vice president succeeded the president in turbulent political situations. The last time was in 2005 after the resignation of president Lucio Gutiérrez. According to the current constitution, the vice president is elected on the same ticket as the president. Salary of the vice president is US$4,869 per month.

The current vice president is Maria Jose Pinto since 24 May 2025.

Below is the history of the office holders.

== List ==
Picture	Name	Took office	Left office	President
	José Joaquín de Olmedo (1780-1847)	1830	1831	Juan José Flores
	José Modesto Larrea (1799-1861)	1831	1835	Juan José Flores
	Juan Bernardo León (1774-1840)	1835	1839	Vicente Rocafuerte
	Francisco Aguirre (1779-1867)	1839	1843	Juan José Flores
	Francisco Marcos (1794-1872)	1843	1845	Juan José Flores
	Pablo Merino (1793-1854)	1845	1847	Vicente Ramón Roca
	Manuel de Ascásubi (1804-1876)	1847	1851	Vicente Ramón Roca
	Position abolished	1851	1852	
	Pacifico Chiriboga (1810-1886)	1852	1854	José María Urbina
	Manuel Bustamante (1802-1890)	1854	1856	José María Urbina
	Marcos Espinel (1809-1876)	1856	1858	José María Urbina; Francisco Robles
	Jerónimo Carrión (1804-1873)	1858	1860	Francisco Robles
	Mariano Cueva (1810-1882)	1861	1863	Gabriel García Moreno
	Antonio Borrero (1827-1911)	1863	1864	Gabriel García Moreno
	Rafael Carvajal (1818-1881)	1864	1865	Gabriel García Moreno
	Pedro José de Arteta (1797-1873)	1865	1867	Jerónimo Carrión
	Position vacant	1867	1868	
	Pedro José de Arteta (1797-1873)	1868	1869	Juan Javier Espinosa
	Francisco Javier León (1832-1880)	1869	1875	Gabriel García Moreno
	Position vacant	1875	1883	
	Rafael Pérez Pareja (1836-1897)	1883	1884	José Plácido Caamaño
	Agustín Guerrero Lizarzaburu (1819-1902)	1884	1886	José Plácido Caamaño
	Pedro José Cevallos (1830-1892)	1886	1890	José Plácido Caamaño; Antonio Flores Jijón
	Pablo Herrera (1820-1896)	1890	1894	Antonio Flores Jijón; Luis Cordero Crespo
	Vicente Lucio Salazar (1832-1896)	1894	1895	Luis Cordero Crespo
	Position vacant	1895	1897	
	Manuel Benigno Cueva (1843-1918)	1897	1899	Eloy Alfaro
	Carlos Freile Zaldumbide (1856-1928)	1899	1903	Eloy Alfaro; Leonidas Plaza
	Alfredo Baquerizo (1859-1951)	1903	1906	Leonidas Plaza; Lizardo García
	Position abolished	1906	1946	
	Mariano Suárez Veintimilla (1897-1980)	1946	1947	José María Velasco Ibarra
	José Rafael Bustamante (1881-1961)	1947	1948	Carlos Julio Arosemena Tola
	Manuel Sotomayor (1884-1949)	1948	1949	Galo Plaza Lasso
	Abel Gilbert (1889-1965)	1949	1952	Galo Plaza Lasso
	Alfredo Chiriboga (1897-1975)	1952	1956	José María Velasco Ibarra
	Francisco Illingworth (1905-1982)	1956	1960	Camilo Ponce Enríquez
	C. J. Arosemena Monroy (1919-2004)	1960	1961	José María Velasco Ibarra
	Reinaldo Varea (1916-2008)	1961	1963	Carlos Julio Arosemena Monroy
	Position vacant	1963	1968	
	Jorge Zavala (1922-2014)	1968	1972	José María Velasco Ibarra
	Position vacant	1972	1979	
	Osvaldo Hurtado (born 1939)	1979	1981	Jaime Roldós Aguilera
	León Roldós Aguilera (born 1942)	1981	1984	Osvaldo Hurtado
	Blasco Peñaherrera (born 1934)	1984	1988	León Febres Cordero
	Luis Parodi (1936-2020)	1988	1992	Rodrigo Borja
	Alberto Dahik (born 1953)	1992	1995	Sixto Durán Ballén
	Eduardo Peña (born 1936)	1995	1996	Sixto Durán Ballén
	Rosalía Arteaga (born 1956)	1996	1998	Abdalá Bucaram; Fabián Alarcón
	Pedro Aguayo Cubillo (1939-2025)	1998	1998	Fabián Alarcón
	Gustavo Noboa (1937-2021)	1998	2000	Jamil Mahuad
	Pedro Pinto Rubianes (1931-2022)	2000	2003	Gustavo Noboa
	Alfredo Palacio (1939-2025)	2003	2005	Lucio Gutierrez
	Alejandro Serrano (1933-2019)	5 May 2005	15 January 2007	Alfredo Palacio
	Lenín Moreno (born 1953)	15 January 2007	24 May 2013	Rafael Correa
	Jorge Glas (born 1969)	24 May 2013	Powers and duties suspended on 3 August 2017; 6 January 2018	Rafael Correa; Lenín Moreno
	María Alejandra Vicuña (born 1978)	4 October 2017	6 January 2018 (Acting for Jorge Glas to 2 January 2018)	Lenín Moreno
	María Alejandra Vicuña (born 1978)	6 January 2018	Powers and duties suspended on 3 December 2018; 4 December 2018	Lenín Moreno
	Otto Sonnenholzner (born 1983)	11 December 2018	7 July 2020	Lenín Moreno
	María Alejandra Muñoz (born 1978)	22 July 2020	24 May 2021	Lenín Moreno
	Alfredo Borrero (born 1955)	24 May 2021	23 November 2023	Guillermo Lasso
	Verónica Abad Rojas (born 1976)	23 November 2023	24 May 2025; Powers and duties suspended from 9 November 2024 to 3 December 2024 and again on 30 March 2025 to May 24 2025	Daniel Noboa
	Sariha Moya (acting) (born 1988)	11 November 2024	23 December 2024	Daniel Noboa
	Cynthia Gellibert (acting) (born 1971/72)	30 March 2025	24 May 2025	Daniel Noboa
	María José Pinto (born 1986)	24 May 2025	Incumbent	Daniel Noboa

== See also ==
- List of current vice presidents
