= Pedro José Cevallos =

Vice president of Ecuador (1830–1892)

Acting President of Ecuador
- In office 1 July 1888 – 17 August 1888
- Preceded by: José Plácido Caamaño
- Succeeded by: Antonio Flores Jijón

Vice President of Ecuador
- In office 1886–1890
- President: José Plácido Caamaño; Antonio Flores Jijón
- Preceded by: Carlos Freire Zaldumbide
- Succeeded by: Pablo Herrera

Personal details
- Born: Pedro José Cevallos; 1830 Quito, Ecuador
- Died: November 11, 1892 (aged 61–62)
- Political party: Conservative Party

Pedro José Cevallos Salvador (1830–November 11, 1892) was President of Ecuador from 1 July 1888 to 17 August 1888 and Vice President from 1886 to 1890. From April to August 1891 the presidency of Antonio Flores he was minister of Public Instruction, Interior Affairs and Foreign Affairs. Shortly before his death he became a member of the Ecuadoran Academy of Literature.

Political offices
Preceded by Pablo Herrera González	President of the National Court of Justice; 1876	Succeeded by Julio Castro Bastus
Preceded by Agustín Guerrero Lizarzaburu	Vice President of Ecuador; 1886-1890	Succeeded by Pablo Herrera
Preceded by José Plácido Caamaño	President of Ecuador; 1888	Succeeded by Antonio Flores
