= Verónica Abad Rojas =

Ecuadorian politician (born 1976)

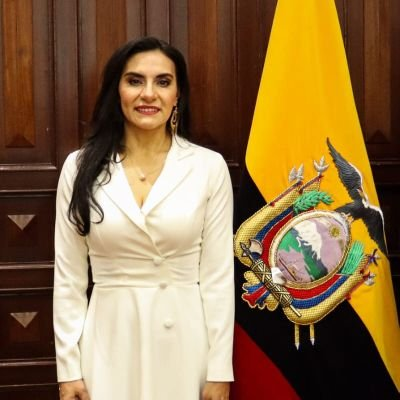
- Abad Rojas in 2023

53rd Vice President of Ecuador
- In office 23 November 2023 (Note: Suspended: 9 November 2024 – 23 December 2024. During this time period, Sariha Moya assumed the role of acting vice president. Suspended: 30 March 2025 – 24 May 2025. During this time period, Cynthia Gellibert assumed the role of acting vice president.) – 24 May 2025
- President: Daniel Noboa
- Preceded by: Alfredo Borrero
- Succeeded by: María José Pinto

Ambassador of Ecuador to Israel
- In office 4 December 2023 – 9 November 2024
- President: Daniel Noboa
- Preceded by: María Concepción Barahona Páez
- Succeeded by: María Cristina Cevallos

Personal details
- Born: 14 November 1976 (age 49) Cuenca, Ecuador
- Party: National Democratic Action
- Other political affiliations: AMIGO Movement
- Children: 3
- Occupation: Business coach

Verónica Abad Rojas (born 14 November 1976) is an Ecuadorian business coach and politician who served as the 53rd Vice President of Ecuador from 2023 to 2025 under the first term of President Daniel Noboa. Prior to her vice presidency, she was an unsuccessful candidate for mayor of Cuenca in 2023 and previously worked on international projects to support entrepreneurship for young people and women.

Abad Rojas was elected to the vice presidency as the running mate for Daniel Noboa following the second round of the 2023 general election. Upon their inauguration in November 2023, both Noboa and Abad Rojas distanced themselves from each other with Abad Rojas launching personal attacks against Noboa. In June 2024, Abad Rojas survived an impeachment attempt. In November 2024, she was suspended from vice-presidency by the labor ministry for 150 days. Her suspension was lifted by a judge in December 2024, ordering the labor ministry to give her an apology for the suspension, but she was suspended again in March 2025.

== Early life and education ==
Veronica Abad was born in Cuenca. She belongs to a musician family, in which she spent her childhood practicing ballet, and playing musical instruments such as piano and violin.

Abad studied Business Administration, but did not finish her degree. Then she took some short courses about Entrepreneurship in Santiago de Chile, Political Strategy at the Friedrich Naumann Foundation for Freedom in Gummersbach, Germany, and Innovation and Technology at the Friends of Zion Institute, Jerusalem.

== Political career ==
Abad began in politics when she participated at the 2006 Ecuadorian local elections. Later on, she became the founder of the Network of Women Directors and worked on international projects to support entrepreneurship, especially for young people and women.

Abad worked at the Secretary Against Child Malnutrition between 2020 and 2022.

In the 2023 Ecuadorian local elections, Abad was candidate for Mayor of Cuenca for the AMIGO Movement.

In the 2023 general election later that year, Abad became the running mate of presidential candidate Daniel Noboa and they unexpectedly advanced to the run-off election and won. They ran under the National Democratic Action ticket.

== Vice presidency ==
Upon their inauguration in November 2023, both Noboa and Abad Rojas distanced themselves from each other with Abad Rojas launching personal attacks against Noboa, while Noboa's administration has pushed back against several Abad Rojas's controversial comments. From the first day of his government, Daniel Noboa maintained a tense relationship with Abad Rojas. She did not appear in the inaugural photo of the cabinet and, subsequently, she was appointed ambassador to Israel. Shortly thereafter, she was ordered to move to Istanbul within three days. Abad called these decisions a “forced exile”. On 4 December 2023, she was formally appointed by President Noboa as Ecuador's peace envoy to Israel. She arrived at the diplomatic mission on 10 December.

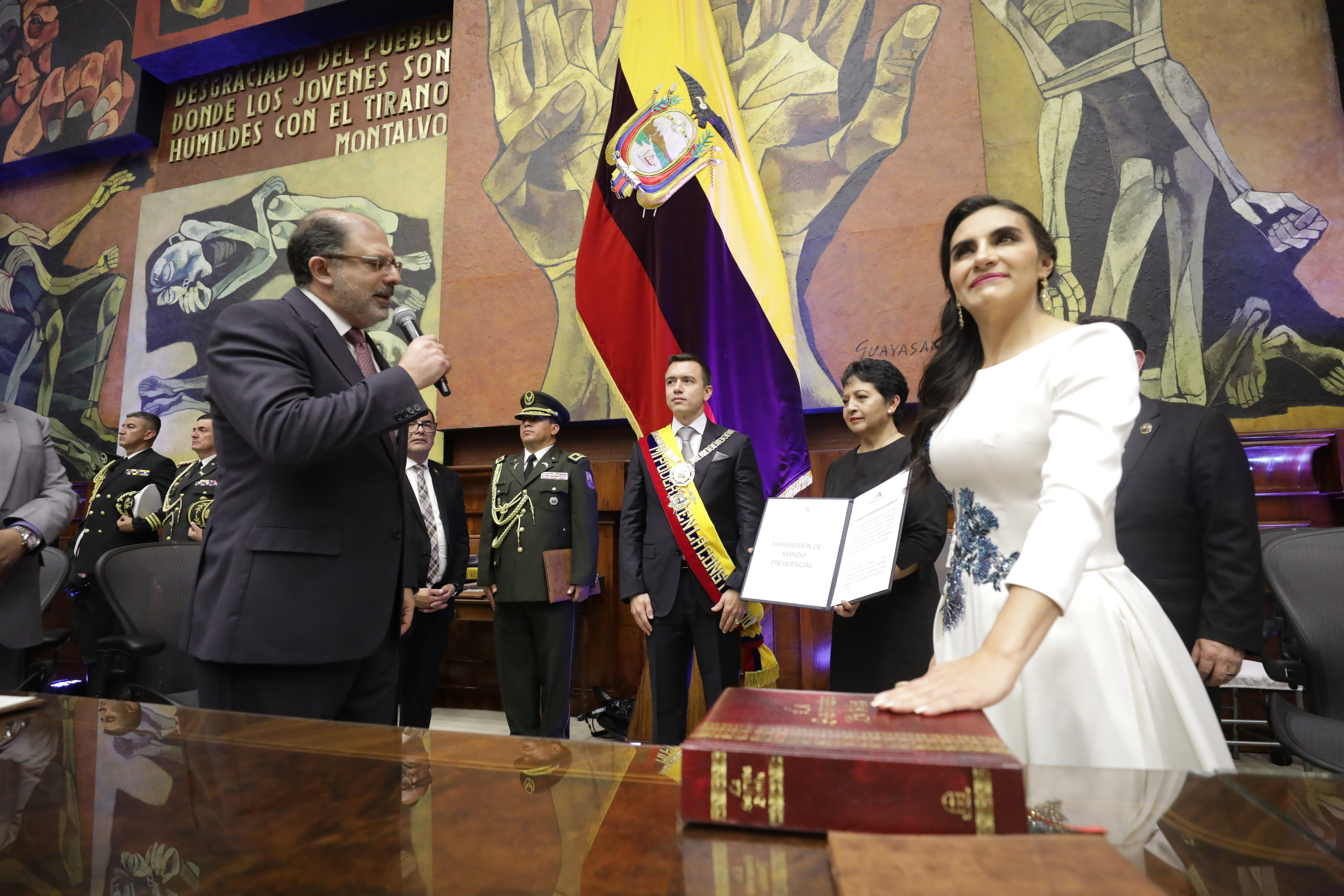
Abad Rojas being inaugurated as vice president, November 2023

In March 2024, the Ecuadorian Justice Ministry detained Abad Rojas's son as part of an ongoing investigation regarding influence peddling in the vice presidential office. The Noboa administration attempted to impeach Abad Rojas as a result in June 2024, however the resolution failed with 47 votes in favor in the National Assembly, short of the 92 votes needed to impeach. Noboa registered to run for re-election in the 2025 general election, and declined to name Rojas Abad as his running mate and naming María José Pinto as his running mate.

On 9 November 2024, Abad was temporarily suspended as vice president by the Ecuadorian government after failing to leave Israel and travel to Turkey. Noboa named Secretary of National Planning Sariha Moya as acting vice president. Her suspension was lifted by a judge in December 2024, ordering the labor ministry to give her an apology for the suspension.

On 30 March 2025, Abad was once again suspended, and Cynthia Gellibert was appointed in a decree by Noboa as the acting Vice President of Ecuador. Her appointment as vice president by decree has caused controversy, along with Noboa's refusal to relinquish his office during the official electoral period, which was intended for Abad.

== Political positions ==
Abad opposes abortion, LGBTQ+ rights and fourth-wave feminism. She says she defends freedom of religion, individual rights, private property, small government and free markets. She has also supported right-wing politicians including Donald Trump and Jair Bolsonaro, and the far-right Spanish party Vox.

== Personal life ==
Abad is a mother of three and grandmother. She is a Christian.
