= Ramón Borrero y Cortázar =

President of Ecuador (1824–1895)

Interim President of Ecuador
- In office 11 October 1883 – 15 October 1883
- Preceded by: Rafael Pérez Pareja
- Succeeded by: José Plácido Caamaño

Personal details
- Born: 1824
- Died: 1895 (aged 70–71)
- Relatives: Antonio Borrero (brother)

Ramón Borrero y Cortázar (1824–1895), brother of former President of Ecuador, Antonio Borrero, was himself President of Ecuador briefly from October 11, 1883 until February 17, 1884. The provisional government's mandate having expired without it having named an interim President, Borrero assumed the role as a result of his holding the position of President of the Senate.

Ramón Borrero was a delegate to both the 1861 and 1884 Constitutional Conventions. He was also a prolific scholar and writer.

Preceded by Rafael Pérez Pareja	President of Ecuador; 1883	Succeeded by José Plácido Caamaño
