= María José Pinto =

Vice President of Ecuador since 2025

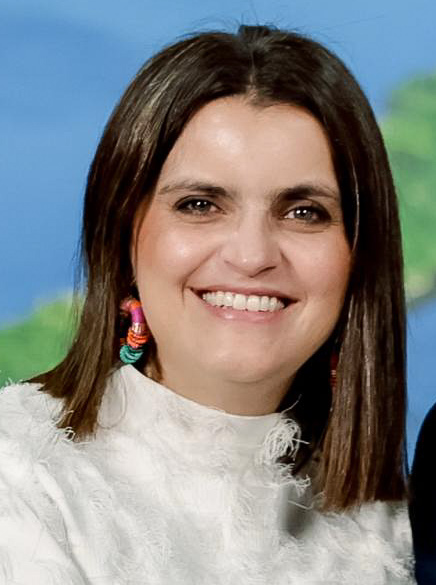
- Pinto in 2025

54th Vice President of Ecuador
- Incumbent
- Assumed office 24 May 2025
- President: Daniel Noboa
- Preceded by: Verónica Abad Rojas; Cynthia Gellibert (acting)

Personal details
- Born: María José Pinto González-Artigas; 29 January 1986 (age 40) Quito, Ecuador
- Party: National Democratic Action
- Children: 2
- Education: INCAE Business School (MBA)
- Occupation: Politician, businesswoman

María José Pinto González-Artigas (born 29 January 1986) is an Ecuadorian businesswoman and politician, who is the Vice President of Ecuador, after winning the 2025 election as the running mate of President Daniel Noboa.

== Education ==
Pinto studied Art and Design at Parsons School of Design in Paris and received an MBA at INCAE Business School.

== Business career ==
For nearly two decades, Pinto was an executive at the family-owned textile company Pinto, where she led innovation and international trade initiatives. She also served on the board of the Ecuadorian Association of Textile Industrialists (AITE), advocating for the growth and modernization of the textile industry.

Pinto actively involved herself in social work, particularly with women and children in the Andean region, supporting community productivity and development. Her entry into politics followed her tenure as head of the Ecuador Grows Without Child Malnutrition Secretariat, a position she held from December 2023 to July 2024, where she focused on strategies to reduce child malnutrition across Ecuador. She is a co-founder and member of Mujeres por Ecuador, a nonprofit organization promoting greater inclusion of women in senior management and corporate boards. She is also affiliated with the Entrepreneurs’ Organization, a global nonprofit with over 14,000 members, offering forums, coaching, and learning events for entrepreneurs.

== 2025 vice presidential campaign ==
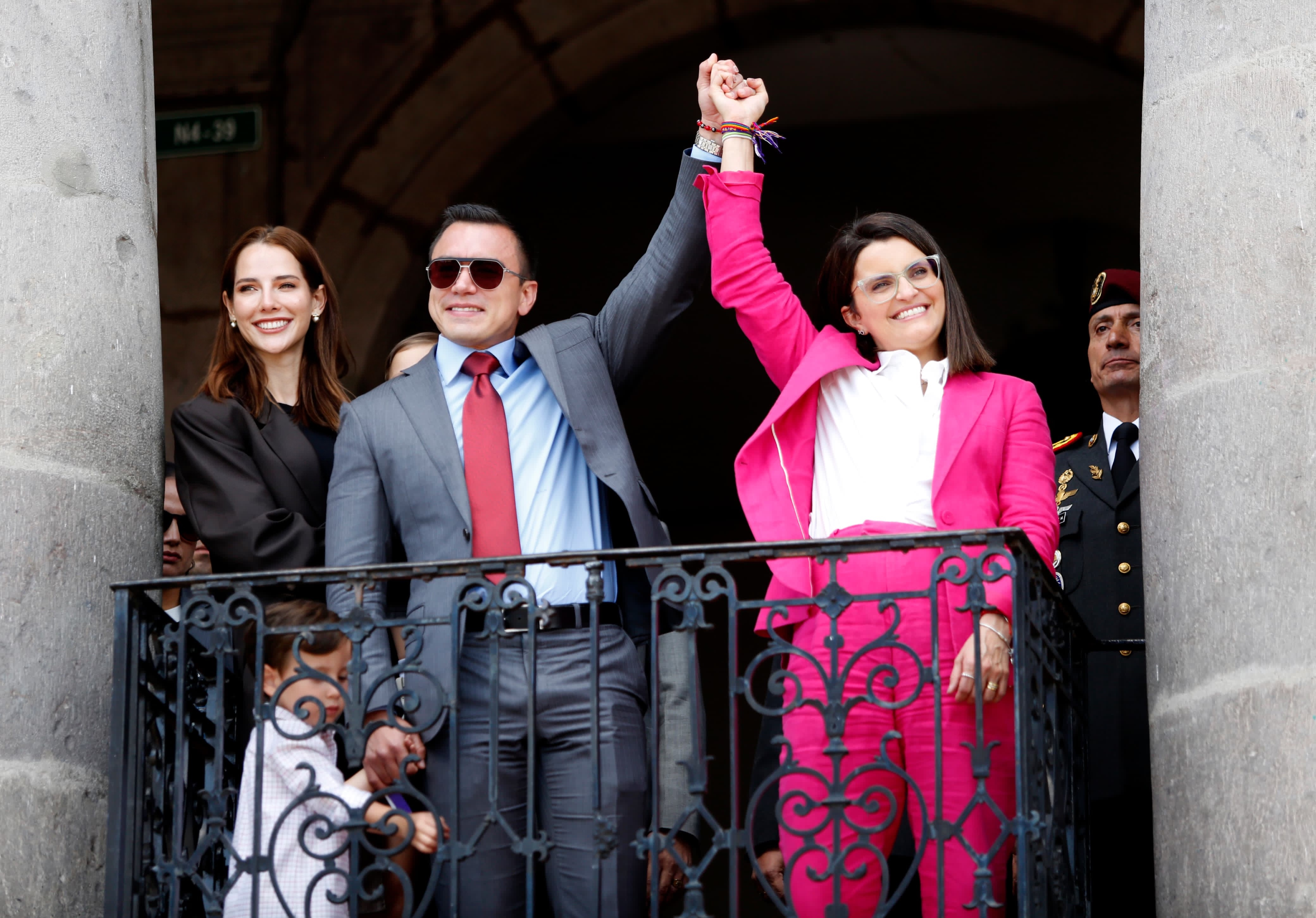
Noboa and Pinto holding hands following their election victory, April 2025

Pinto ran for Vice-President in the 2025 election as the running mate of incumbent president Daniel Noboa, representing the National Democratic Action, and being successfully elected after their win in the run-off. Noboa's campaign was notable for its focus on young people and won a decisive victory in the run-off.

== Personal life ==
She is married and has two children.
