= María Alejandra Muñoz =

Vice President of Ecuador from 2020 to 2021

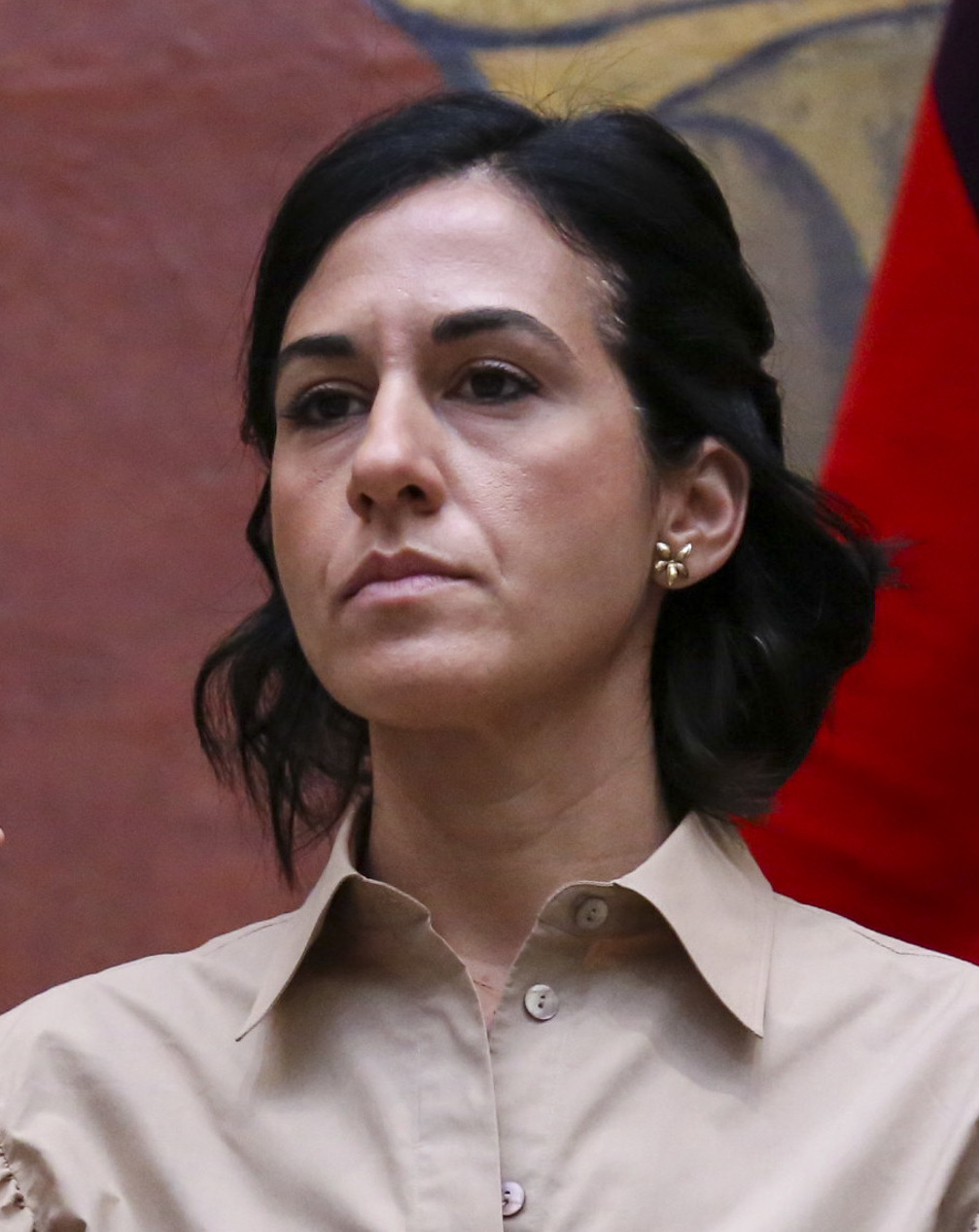
- Muñoz in 2020

51st Vice President of Ecuador
- In office 22 July 2020 – 24 May 2021
- President: Lenín Moreno
- Preceded by: Otto Sonnenholzner
- Succeeded by: Alfredo Borrero

Personal details
- Born: 18 December 1979 (age 46) Guayaquil, Ecuador
- Party: Construye Ecuador
- Children: 4
- Education: University of Salamanca; Universidad de Especialidades Espíritu Santo

María Alejandra Muñoz Seminario (born 18 December 1979) is an Ecuadorian politician and lawyer who was the 51st Vice President of Ecuador from July 2020 until May 2021. She is the third female to hold this position, after Rosalía Arteaga and Maria Alejandra Vicuña.

On 17 July 2020, Muñoz was elected as vice president by the National Assembly, after receiving 75 votes in favor of her election. She was sworn in on 22 July 2020.

Muñoz is married and has four children.
