= Cynthia Gellibert =

Ecuadorian vice president and politician

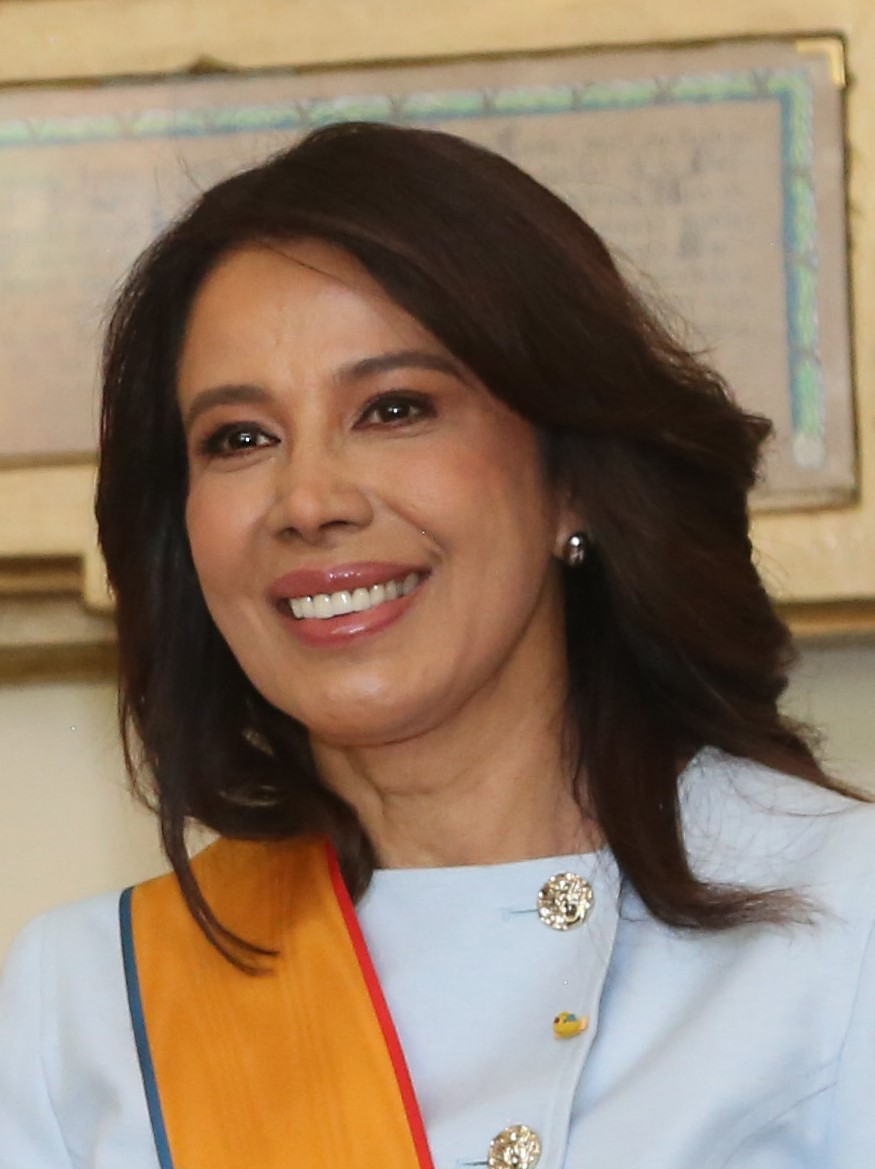
- Gellibert in 2025

Secretary General of Public Administration
- Incumbent
- Assumed office 19 August 2024
- President: Daniel Noboa
- Preceded by: Arturo Félix Wong

Acting Vice President of Ecuador
- In office 30 March 2025 – 24 May 2025
- President: Daniel Noboa
- Preceded by: Verónica Abad Rojas
- Succeeded by: María José Pinto

Personal details
- Party: National Democratic Action
- Occupation: Politician

Cynthia Gellibert, is an Ecuadorian politician who has been the Secretary General of Public Administration since 2024. She was the acting Vice President of Ecuador from 30 March 2025 until 24 May 2025, replacing the elected-Vice President Veronica Abad.

== Education ==
After studying economics at the Vicente Rocafuerte Lay University, she earned a degree in economics. She completed a master's degree in Public Administration at the Santa Elena Peninsula State University.

== Political career ==
In 2010, she worked as a management analyst at the Ministry of Telecommunications. In 2011, she was an advisor at the Ministry of Sport, and that same year, she returned to Telecommunications as head of fixed assets and financial analyst until 2012. Between 2012 and 2014, she again served as an advisor at the Ministry of Sport. In 2015, she held several roles: general administrator at the Provincial Sports Federation of Santo Domingo de los Tsáchilas, office coordinator at the Governing Council of the Special Regime of Galapagos, and advisor at the Ministry of Sports. In 2017, she worked as an advisor and undersecretary of Sports Development. Between 2017 and 2018, she was a public servant at the Ministry of Labor, at Cear EP, a sales and marketing expert, and an advisor to the Guayas Governor's Office. In 2018, she was an analyst of enabling titles and then Director of Planning at the Ecuadorian Transit Commission.

Later, in 2021, she continued as Director of Planning and Planning Assistant at the same institution. She was also the Provincial Coordinator of Affiliation and Technical Control of Guayas at the IESS until 2020. Between 2020 and 2022, she held the position of Zonal Coordinator 5 at the Ministry of Government, and in 2021, she was Head of Collection and Payments at the Teodoro Maldonado Carbo Specialty Hospital.

=== Acting Vice President ===
Gellibert has served as secretary general of public administration for the Noboa administration since 19 August 2024. On 29 March 2025, she was appointed in a decree by Noboa as the acting Vice President of Ecuador, replacing the elected and suspended, Vice President Veronica Abad. Abad had previously been suspended in November 2024, by the labor ministry for 150 days. Her suspension was lifted by a judge in December 2025, ordering the labor ministry to give her an apology for the suspension.

With her appointment as acting vice president, President Daniel Noboa focused on institutional stability and a leadership aligned with his vision of government. This decision reinforced his political strategy in the wake of the close 2025 election. Her appointment as vice president by decree has caused controversy, along with Noboa's refusal to relinquish his office during the official electoral period, which was intended for his vice president, Verónica Abad Rojas. Noboa won re-election, resulting into Gellibert being succeeded by Noboa's running mate María José Pinto on 24 May 2025.
