= Alfredo Borrero =

Vice President of Ecuador from 2021 to 2023

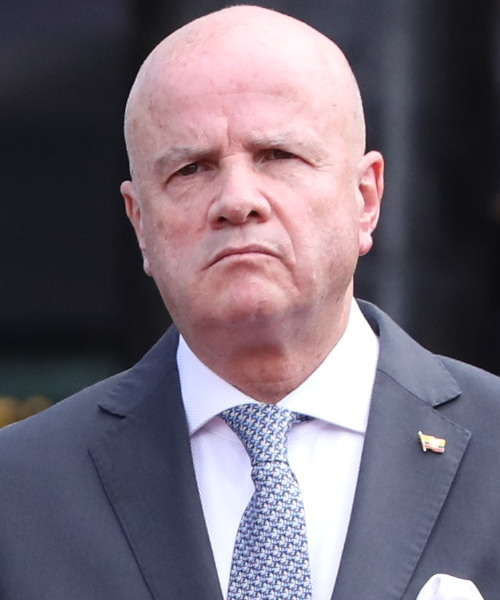
- Borrero in 2022

52nd Vice President of Ecuador
- In office 24 May 2021 – 23 November 2023
- President: Guillermo Lasso
- Preceded by: María Alejandra Muñoz
- Succeeded by: Verónica Abad Rojas

Personal details
- Born: Alfredo Enrique Borrero Vega; 19 October 1955 (age 70) Cuenca, Ecuador
- Party: Creating Opportunities
- Spouse: Lucia Pazmiño Salvador
- Relations: Jasmine Tookes (daughter-in-law)
- Children: 4
- Education: Harvard University
- Occupation: Neurosurgeon, politician

Alfredo Enrique Borrero Vega (born 19 October 1955) is an Ecuadorian neurosurgeon and politician who served as the 52nd vice president of Ecuador from 2021 to 2023. He was elected to the vice presidency in the 2021 election. Borrero Vega was the running mate of Guillermo Lasso from the political party called Creating Opportunities.

== Medical career ==
Between 2005 and 2014, Borrero was the medical director of the Hospital Metropolitano of Quito. He was the president of the Association of Private Hospitals and Clinics from 2007 to 2014. He is the dean and administrator of the Faculty of Medicine of the Universidad de las Americas (UDLA). Borrero has 40 years of experience in health administration and has worked in medical and educational institutions for more than 25 years in the same city.

In March 2020, he became the director of Saving Lives, an initiative created by Guillermo Lasso against the COVID-19 pandemic and raised 8 million dollars to help purchase supplies and equipment for the Ecuadorian Health System. In the middle of that same month, he was named the Executive Director of this institution.

== Vice-presidency (2021–2023) ==
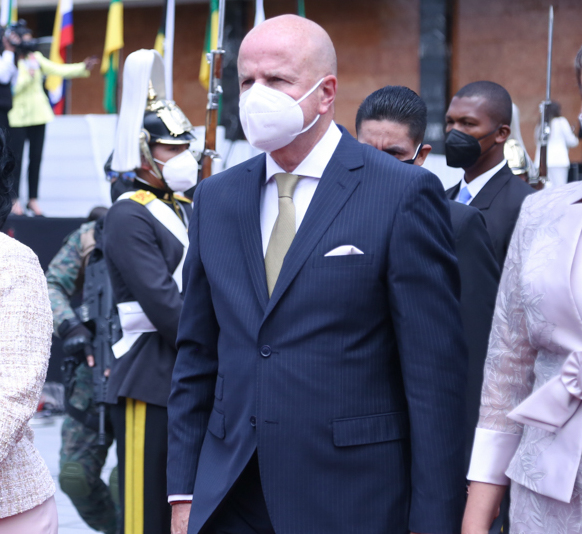
Borrero at his inauguration ceremony, May 2021

=== 2021 election ===
In October 2020, Guillermo Lasso, presidential candidate of the party called Creating Opportunities, named Borrero as his running mate for the 2021 election. In February 2021, the ticket advanced to the April run-off election, following a narrow second-place victory over Yaku Pérez.

One poll before the run-off had Arauz leading Lasso with a 82% certainty of winning. The Lasso-Borrero ticket defeated Arauz with 52% on 11 April in the run-off election in an upset victory.

On 19 May 2021, he received his credentials as the constitutional Vice President in anticipation of his inauguration.

=== Tenure ===
Borrero was inaugurated as the 52nd vice president of Ecuador on 24 May 2021.

== Personal life ==
Borrero was born in Cuenca, Ecuador in 1955. Borrero is a graduate in Health Administration from Harvard University.

He is married to Lucia Pazmiño and has four children from previous marriages, one of whom is Juan David Borrero, director of international markets at Snap Inc. and husband to the American Victoria's Secret model, Jasmine Tookes.
