= Antonio Flores Jijón =

President of Ecuador (1888–1892)

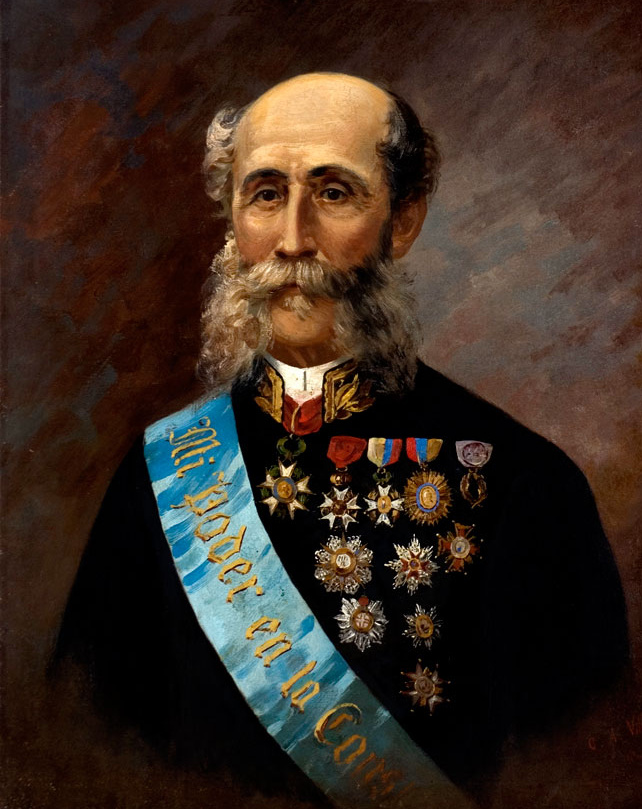

13th President of Ecuador
- In office 17 August 1888 – 30 June 1892
- Vice President: Pedro Cevallos (1888—1890); Pablo Herrera (1890—1892)
- Preceded by: Pedro José Cevallos
- Succeeded by: Luis Cordero Crespo

Personal details
- Born: 23 October 1833 Quito, Ecuador
- Died: 30 August 1915 (aged 81) Geneva, Switzerland
- Parents: Juan José Flores (father); Mercedes Jijón de Vivanco y Chiriboga (mother)

Juan Antonio María Flores y Jijón de Vivanco (23 October 1833 – 30 August 1915) as 13th President of Ecuador 17 August 1888 to 30 June 1892. He was a member of the Progressive Party, a Liberal Catholic party.

Antonio Flores was born in Quito at Carondelet Palace (the presidential residence) while his father, General Juan José Flores, presided over the nation. His mother was Mercedes Jijón de Vivanco y Chiriboga, daughter of the Count of Casa Jijón, member of one of Quito's old aristocratic families.

During the first presidency of Gabriel García Moreno, Flores was an ambassador in Paris, London, and Washington. He was also Minister of Finance in 1865. He died in Geneva, Switzerland. He was married to Leonor Ruiz de Apodaca y García-Tienza, a native of Cuba. His vice president and predecessor was Pedro José Cevallos.

Political offices
| Preceded by Pedro José Cevallos | President of Ecuador; 1888–1892 | Succeeded by Luis Cordero |
