= Cabinet of Ecuador =

Section of the executive branch of Ecuadorian government

The Cabinet of Ecuador is part of the executive branch of the Ecuadorian government, consisting of the heads of the variable number of government ministries. The cabinet is appointed by the President.
