= Rafael Pérez Pareja =

Vice president of Ecuador (1836–1897)

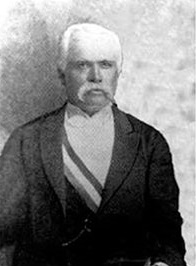
- Rafael Pérez Pareja

President of the Provisional Government of Quito
- In office 9 July 1883 – 17 September 1883
- Preceded by: Luis Cordero Crespo
- Succeeded by: Ramón Borrero y Cortázar

Vice President of Ecuador
- In office 15 October 1883 – 10 February 1884
- Succeeded by: Agustín Guerrero Lizarzaburu

Member of the Provisional Government of Quito
- In office 14 February 1883 – 11 October 1883

Personal details
- Born: 1836 Quito, Ecuador
- Died: 1897 (aged 60–61) Quito, Ecuador
- Spouse: Antonia Chiriboga y Muñoz
- Children: Juan Nepomuceno; Carmen Amelia; Rafael; Miguel Ángel; Antonio; María; Eduardo; Pedro; Elisa; Mercedes Elena

Rafael Pérez Pareja (1836–1897) was a public figure in 19th-century Ecuador, a supporter of liberalism.

He served as Vice President of Ecuador from 15 October 1883 to 10 February 1884.

Born in the household formed by José María Pérez Calisto, Knight First Class of the Royal American Order of Isabel the Catholic, and Leonor de Pareja y Arteta.

He fought vehemently against the dictatorship of Ignacio de Veintemilla.

He was military chief of the province of Pichincha, only to be interim president of Ecuador as a member of pentavirato who ruled the country between 14 January and 15 October 1883, along with Pablo Herrera, Luis Cordero, Pedro Lizarzaburu and Agustin Guerrero.

He married Munoz Antonia Chiriboga in 1850.

== Sources ==
- Diego Pérez-Ordóñez, Genealogía de los Pérez de Quito, descendientes de don Pedro Pérez Muñoz, publicaciones Ceniga, Quito, 1994.
- Fernando Jurado Noboa, Los Chiriboga, Quito, 1989.

Political offices
Preceded by Luis Cordero Crespo	President of Ecuador; 1883	Succeeded by Ramón Borrero y Cortázar
