= List of elected or appointed female heads of state or government =

Gender of chief executive by year

Map showing countries which currently have women as heads of state or government, counting governors-general but not monarchs.

Map showing countries which since independence have had women as heads of state or government. (Constituent countries of the Netherlands are counted.)

Female head of government
Female head of state
Female head of state or government (combined) (Note: Heads of government of constitutional monarchies without a vice-regal representative are included.)
Female head of state and female head of government
Female prime minister or state counselor acting as deputy to the combined head of state and government (de facto leader)
- Three former sovereign states had a female head of state or government in the 20th century: East Germany, Tannu Tuva and Yugoslavia.

The following is a list of women who have been elected or appointed head of state or government of their respective countries. The first list includes female presidents who are heads of state and may also be heads of government, as well as female heads of government who are not concurrently head of state, such as prime ministers. The list does not include Queens regnant who are heads of state (but not of government). (Note: As of 2024, there is one female monarch of a sovereign state, Ntfombi of Eswatini (as Queen Mother and co-head of state with her son, King Mswati III).)

Khertek Anchimaa, of the mostly unrecognized and now defunct Tuvan People's Republic, is regarded as the first elected female head of state in the world, although not in multiparty, free and fair elections. The wife of the nation's Supreme Leader, she is the first woman to be elected chairman of a country. She became the chairwoman of the country's presidium in 1940.

The first woman to be democratically elected as prime minister of a country was Sirimavo Bandaranaike of Ceylon (present-day Sri Lanka), when she led her party to victory in the July 1960 general election.

The first woman to serve as president of a country was Isabel Perón of Argentina, who served as the country's vice president and succeeded to the presidency in July 1974 upon the death of her husband.

In 1979, Margaret Thatcher was elected as Prime Minister of the United Kingdom, becoming both the United Kingdom's first female prime minister, and Europe's first elected female head of government.

The first woman elected president of a country was Vigdís Finnbogadóttir of Iceland, who won the 1980 presidential election as well as three subsequent elections, remaining in office for a total of 16 years, which makes her the longest-serving non-hereditary female head of state in history. Vigdís was also the first woman to win a presidential election where the second place candidate was another woman: she defeated Sigrún Þorsteinsdóttir in the 1988 presidential election.

The first democratically elected female prime minister of a Muslim majority country was Benazir Bhutto of Pakistan, who led her party to victory in the 1988 general election and later in 1993, making her the first woman democratically elected leader of any Muslim nation. Bhutto was also the first of only two non-hereditary female world leaders who gave birth to a child while serving in office, the other being Jacinda Ardern of New Zealand.

The longest-tenured female non-hereditary head of government is Sheikh Hasina of Bangladesh. She served as the country's prime minister from June 1996 to July 2001 and again from January 2009 until August 2024, for a combined total of over 20 years.

Finland was the first republic in which women served concurrently as both the head of state and head of government, with both Anneli Jäätteenmäki and Mari Kiviniemi serving as prime ministers under president Tarja Halonen.

The prime ministers of Equatorial Guinea, Mozambique, Namibia, Peru, and Uganda are included in the list of elected or appointed female deputy heads of government but not in the list of elected or appointed female deputy heads of state, as they are neither heads of government, nor deputy heads of state due to the existence of the office of vice president in these countries, whereas the prime ministers of South Korea and Sri Lanka (post-1978) are included in both of those lists.

Currently, Iceland and Trinidad and Tobago are the only republics where both the serving head of state and head of government are women. Costa Rica, the Marshall Islands, Mexico, Namibia, Peru, Suriname, Tanzania, and Venezuela are republics where the female President is the combined head of state and government.

== Elected or appointed female chief executives ==
This list includes women who were appointed by a governing committee or parliament where heads of state or government are not directly elected by citizens. The list does not include women chosen by a hereditary monarch. Interim heads of state or government are listed in italics.

Incumbent

Name	Portrait	Country	Office	Mandate start	Mandate end	Term length	Head of state or government	Executive or non-executive
Sirimavo Bandaranaike		Ceylon/ Sri Lanka	Prime Minister	21 July 1960	27 March 1965	4 years, 249 days	Head of government	Executive (Note: Since 1978, Prime Ministers of Sri Lanka are no longer executive heads of government.)
Sirimavo Bandaranaike		Ceylon/ Sri Lanka	Prime Minister	29 May 1970	23 July 1977	7 years, 55 days (Total Term: 11 years, 304 days)	Head of government	Executive
Indira Gandhi		India	Prime Minister	24 January 1966	24 April 1977	11 years, 90 days	Head of government	Executive
Indira Gandhi		India	Prime Minister	15 January 1980	31 October 1984 (assassinated)	4 years, 290 days (Total Term: 16 years, 15 days)	Head of government	Executive
Golda Meir		Israel	Prime Minister	17 March 1969	3 June 1974	5 years, 78 days	Head of government	Executive
Isabel Perón		Argentina	President	1 July 1974	24 March 1976	1 year, 267 days	Head of state and government	Executive
Elisabeth Domitien		Central African Republic	Prime Minister	2 January 1975	7 April 1976	1 year, 96 days	Head of government	
Margaret Thatcher		United Kingdom	Prime Minister	4 May 1979	28 November 1990	11 years, 208 days	Head of government	Executive
Maria de Lourdes Pintasilgo		Portugal	Prime Minister	1 August 1979	3 January 1980	155 days	Head of government	Executive
Lidia Gueiler Tejada		Bolivia	President	16 November 1979	17 July 1980	244 days	Head of state	Executive
Eugenia Charles		Dominica	Prime Minister	21 July 1980	14 June 1995	14 years, 328 days	Head of government	Executive
Vigdís Finnbogadóttir		Iceland	President	1 August 1980	1 August 1996	16 years, 0 days	Head of state	
Gro Harlem Brundtland		Norway	Prime Minister	4 February 1981	14 October 1981	252 days	Head of government	Executive
Gro Harlem Brundtland		Norway	Prime Minister	9 May 1986	16 October 1989	3 years, 160 days	Head of government	Executive
Gro Harlem Brundtland		Norway	Prime Minister	3 November 1990	25 October 1996	5 years, 357 days (Total Term: 10 years, 39 days)	Head of government	Executive
Soong Ching-ling		China	Honorary President	16 May 1981	28 May 1981	12 days	Head of state	
Agatha Barbara		Malta	President	15 February 1982	15 February 1987	5 years, 0 days	Head of state	
Milka Planinc		Yugoslavia	Prime Minister	16 May 1982	15 May 1986	3 years, 364 days	Head of government	Executive
Corazon Aquino		Philippines	President	25 February 1986	30 June 1992	6 years, 126 days	Head of state and government	Executive
Stella Sigcau		Transkei (Note: Transkei was a partially recognized state which existed between 1976 and 1994. The only United Nations member state that recognized its independence was South Africa, and it was later reabsorbed into South Africa in 1994.)	Prime Minister	5 October 1987	30 December 1987	86 days	Head of government	Executive
Benazir Bhutto		Pakistan	Prime Minister	2 December 1988	6 July 1990	1 year, 216 days	Head of government	Executive
Benazir Bhutto		Pakistan	Prime Minister	19 October 1993	5 November 1996	3 years, 17 days (Total term: 4 years, 233 days)	Head of government	Executive
Ertha Pascal-Trouillot		Haiti	President	13 March 1990	7 February 1991	331 days	Head of state	
Kazimira Prunskienė		Lithuania	Prime Minister	11 March 1990	10 January 1991	299 days	Head of government	Executive
Sabine Bergmann-Pohl		East Germany	President of the People's Chamber	5 April 1990	2 October 1990	180 days	Head of state	
Violeta Chamorro		Nicaragua	President	25 April 1990	10 January 1997	6 years, 260 days	Head of state and government	Executive
Mary Robinson		Ireland	President	3 December 1990	12 September 1997	6 years, 283 days	Head of state	
Khaleda Zia		Bangladesh	Prime Minister	20 March 1991	30 March 1996	5 years, 10 days	Head of government	Executive
Khaleda Zia		Bangladesh	Prime Minister	10 October 2001	29 October 2006	5 years, 19 days (Total Term: 10 years, 29 days)	Head of government	Executive
Édith Cresson		France	Prime Minister	15 May 1991	2 April 1992	323 days	Head of government	
Hanna Suchocka		Poland	Prime Minister	11 July 1992	25 October 1993	1 year, 106 days	Head of government	Executive
Tansu Çiller		Turkey	Prime Minister	13 June 1993	6 March 1996	2 years, 267 days	Head of government	Executive
Kim Campbell		Canada	Prime Minister	25 June 1993	4 November 1993	132 days	Head of government	Executive
Sylvie Kinigi		Burundi	Prime Minister	10 July 1993	7 February 1994	109 days	Head of government	
Agathe Uwilingiyimana		Rwanda	Prime Minister	18 July 1993	7 April 1994 (assassinated)	263 days	Head of government	
Chandrika Kumaratunga		Sri Lanka	President	12 November 1994	19 November 2005	11 years, 7 days	Head of state and government	Executive
Claudette Werleigh		Haiti	Prime Minister	7 November 1995	27 February 1996	112 days	Head of government	
Sheikh Hasina		Bangladesh	Prime Minister	23 June 1996	15 July 2001	5 years, 22 days	Head of government	Executive
Sheikh Hasina		Bangladesh	Prime Minister	6 January 2009	5 August 2024	15 years, 212 days (Total Term: 20 years, 234 days)	Head of government	Executive
Ruth Perry		Liberia	Chairwoman of the Council of State	3 September 1996	2 August 1997	333 days	Head of state and government	Executive
Rosalía Arteaga		Ecuador	President	9 February 1997	11 February 1997	2 days	Head of state and government	Executive
Mary McAleese		Ireland	President	11 November 1997	11 November 2011	14 years, 0 days	Head of state	
Jenny Shipley		New Zealand	Prime Minister	8 December 1997	10 December 1999	2 years, 2 days	Head of government	Executive
Janet Jagan		Guyana	President	19 December 1997	11 August 1999	1 year, 235 days	Head of state and government	Executive
Vaira Vīķe-Freiberga		Latvia	President	8 July 1999	8 July 2007	8 years, 0 days	Head of state	
Mireya Moscoso		Panama	President	1 September 1999	1 September 2004	5 years, 0 days	Head of state and government	Executive
Helen Clark		New Zealand	Prime Minister	10 December 1999	19 November 2008	8 years, 350 days	Head of government	Executive
Tarja Halonen		Finland	President	1 March 2000	1 March 2012	12 years, 0 days	Head of state	
Gloria Macapagal Arroyo		Philippines	President	20 January 2001	30 June 2010	9 years, 161 days	Head of state and government	Executive
Mame Madior Boye		Senegal	Prime Minister	3 March 2001	4 November 2002	1 year, 246 days	Head of government	Executive
Megawati Sukarnoputri		Indonesia	President	23 July 2001	20 October 2004	3 years, 89 days	Head of state and government	Executive
Maria das Neves		São Tomé and Príncipe	Prime Minister	3 October 2002	18 September 2004	1 year, 351 days	Head of government	
Anneli Jäätteenmäki		Finland	Prime Minister	17 April 2003	24 June 2003	68 days	Head of government	Executive
Yulia Tymoshenko		Ukraine	Prime Minister	24 January 2005	6 September 2005	225 days	Head of government	Executive
Yulia Tymoshenko		Ukraine	Prime Minister	18 December 2007	3 March 2010	2 years, 75 days (Total Term: 2 years, 300 days)	Head of government	Executive
Maria do Carmo Silveira		São Tomé and Príncipe	Prime Minister	8 June 2005	21 April 2006	317 days	Head of government	
Angela Merkel		Germany	Chancellor	22 November 2005	8 December 2021	16 years, 16 days	Head of government	Executive
Ellen Johnson Sirleaf		Liberia	President	16 January 2006	22 January 2018	12 years, 6 days	Head of state and government	Executive
Michelle Bachelet		Chile	President	11 March 2006	11 March 2010	4 years, 0 days	Head of state and government	Executive
Michelle Bachelet		Chile	President	11 March 2014	11 March 2018	4 years, 0 days (Total Term: 8 years)	Head of state and government	Executive
Portia Simpson-Miller		Jamaica	Prime Minister	30 March 2006	11 September 2007	1 year, 165 days	Head of government	Executive
Portia Simpson-Miller		Jamaica	Prime Minister	5 January 2012	3 March 2016	4 years, 58 days (Total Term: 5 years, 223 days)	Head of government	Executive
Pratibha Patil		India	President	25 July 2007	25 July 2012	5 years, 0 days	Head of state	
Cristina Fernández de Kirchner		Argentina	President	10 December 2007	10 December 2015	8 years, 0 days	Head of state and government	Executive
Zinaida Greceanîi		Moldova	Prime Minister	31 March 2008	14 September 2009	1 year, 167 days	Head of government	Executive
Michèle Pierre-Louis		Haiti	Prime Minister	5 September 2008	11 November 2009	1 year, 67 days	Head of government	
Jóhanna Sigurðardóttir		Iceland	Prime Minister	1 February 2009	23 May 2013	4 years, 111 days	Head of government	Executive
Jadranka Kosor		Croatia	Prime Minister	6 July 2009	23 December 2011	2 years, 170 days	Head of government	Executive
Dalia Grybauskaitė		Lithuania	President	12 July 2009	12 July 2019	10 years, 0 days	Head of state	
Roza Otunbayeva		Kyrgyzstan	President	7 April 2010	1 December 2011	1 year, 238 days	Head of state	
Laura Chinchilla		Costa Rica	President	8 May 2010	8 May 2014	4 years, 0 days	Head of state and government	Executive
Kamla Persad-Bissessar		Trinidad and Tobago	Prime Minister	26 May 2010	9 September 2015	5 years, 106 days	Head of government	Executive
Kamla Persad-Bissessar		Trinidad and Tobago	Prime Minister	1 May 2025	Incumbent	1 year, 203 days	Head of government	Executive
Mari Kiviniemi		Finland	Prime Minister	22 June 2010	22 June 2011	1 year, 0 days	Head of government	Executive
Julia Gillard		Australia	Prime Minister	24 June 2010	27 June 2013	3 years, 3 days	Head of government	Executive
Iveta Radičová		Slovakia	Prime Minister	8 July 2010	4 April 2012	1 year, 271 days	Head of government	Executive
Dilma Rousseff		Brazil	President	1 January 2011	31 August 2016; Suspended 12 May 2016	5 years, 243 days 5 years, 139 days	Head of state and government	Executive
Cissé Mariam Kaïdama Sidibé		Mali	Prime Minister	3 April 2011	22 March 2012	354 days	Head of government	
Atifete Jahjaga		Kosovo	President	7 April 2011	7 April 2016	5 years, 0 days	Head of state	
Yingluck Shinawatra		Thailand	Prime Minister	5 August 2011	7 May 2014	2 years, 275 days	Head of government	Executive
Helle Thorning-Schmidt		Denmark	Prime Minister	3 October 2011	28 June 2015	3 years, 268 days	Head of government	Executive
Joyce Banda		Malawi	President	7 April 2012	31 May 2014	2 years, 54 days	Head of state and government	Executive
Park Geun-hye		South Korea	President	25 February 2013	10 March 2017; Suspended 9 December 2016	4 years, 13 days 3 years, 288 days	Head of state and government	Executive
Alenka Bratušek		Slovenia	Prime Minister	20 March 2013	18 September 2014	1 year, 182 days	Head of government	Executive
Tatiana Turanskaya		Transnistria (Note: Transnistria is an unrecognized state which declared its independence in 1990. It does not have any international recognition as an independent nation by United Nations member states, and is considered by the international community to be part of the Republic of Moldova.)	Prime Minister	10 June 2013	13 October 2015	2 years, 125 days	Head of government	Executive
Tatiana Turanskaya		Transnistria	Prime Minister	30 November 2015	2 December 2015	2 days (Total Term: 2 years, 127 days)	Head of government	Executive
Sibel Siber		Northern Cyprus (Note: Northern Cyprus is a partially recognized de facto state. Only Turkey recognizes its independence, while the remainder of the international community considers it to be part of the Republic of Cyprus.)	Prime Minister	13 June 2013	2 September 2013	81 days	Head of government	Executive
Aminata Touré		Senegal	Prime Minister	1 September 2013	8 July 2014	310 days	Head of government	Executive
Erna Solberg		Norway	Prime Minister	16 October 2013	14 October 2021	7 years, 363 days	Head of government	Executive
Laimdota Straujuma		Latvia	Prime Minister	22 January 2014	11 February 2016	2 years, 20 days	Head of government	Executive
Catherine Samba-Panza		Central African Republic	President	23 January 2014	30 March 2016	2 years, 67 days	Head of state	Executive
Marie-Louise Coleiro Preca		Malta	President	4 April 2014	4 April 2019	5 years, 0 days	Head of state	
Ewa Kopacz		Poland	Prime Minister	22 September 2014	16 November 2015	1 year, 55 days	Head of government	Executive
Kolinda Grabar-Kitarović		Croatia	President	19 February 2015	18 February 2020	4 years, 364 days	Head of state	
Ameenah Gurib-Fakim		Mauritius	President	5 June 2015	23 March 2018	2 years, 291 days	Head of state	
Bidya Devi Bhandari		Nepal	President	29 October 2015	13 March 2023	7 years, 135 days	Head of state	
Beata Szydło		Poland	Prime Minister	16 November 2015	11 December 2017	2 years, 25 days	Head of government	Executive
Hilda Heine		Marshall Islands	President	28 January 2016	14 January 2020	3 years, 351 days	Head of state and government	Executive
Hilda Heine		Marshall Islands	President	3 January 2024	Incumbent	2 years, 321 days	Head of state and government	Executive
Aung San Suu Kyi		Myanmar	State Counsellor	6 April 2016	1 February 2021	4 years, 301 days	De facto head of government	De facto Executive
Tsai Ing-wen		Taiwan	President	20 May 2016	20 May 2024	8 years, 0 days	Head of state	Executive
Theresa May		United Kingdom	Prime Minister	13 July 2016	24 July 2019	3 years, 11 days	Head of government	Executive
Kersti Kaljulaid		Estonia	President	10 October 2016	11 October 2021	5 years, 1 day	Head of state	
Ana Brnabić		Serbia	Prime Minister	29 June 2017	20 March 2024	6 years, 265 days	Head of government	Executive
Halimah Yacob		Singapore	President	14 September 2017	14 September 2023	6 years, 0 days	Head of state	
Jacinda Ardern		New Zealand	Prime Minister	26 October 2017	25 January 2023	5 years, 91 days	Head of government	Executive
Katrín Jakobsdóttir		Iceland	Prime Minister	30 November 2017	9 April 2024	6 years, 131 days	Head of government	Executive
Viorica Dăncilă		Romania	Prime Minister	29 January 2018	4 November 2019	1 year, 279 days	Head of government	Executive
Paula-Mae Weekes		Trinidad and Tobago	President	19 March 2018	20 March 2023	5 years, 1 day	Head of state	
Mia Mottley		Barbados	Prime Minister	25 May 2018	Incumbent	8 years, 179 days	Head of government	Executive
Sahle-Work Zewde		Ethiopia	President	25 October 2018	7 October 2024	5 years, 348 days	Head of state	
Salomé Zurabishvili		Georgia	President	16 December 2018	29 December 2024 (Disputed)	6 years, 13 days	Head of state	
Brigitte Bierlein		Austria	Chancellor	3 June 2019	7 January 2020	218 days	Head of government	Executive
Maia Sandu		Moldova	Prime Minister	8 June 2019	14 November 2019	159 days	Head of government	Executive
Maia Sandu		Moldova	President	24 December 2020	Incumbent	5 years, 331 days	Head of state	
Zuzana Čaputová		Slovakia	President	15 June 2019	15 June 2024	5 years, 0 days	Head of state	
Mette Frederiksen		Denmark	Prime Minister	27 June 2019	Incumbent	7 years, 146 days	Head of government	Executive
Sophie Wilmès		Belgium	Prime Minister	27 October 2019	1 October 2020	340 days	Head of government	Executive
Jeanine Áñez		Bolivia	President	12 November 2019	8 November 2020	362 days	Head of state and government	Executive
Sanna Marin		Finland	Prime Minister	10 December 2019	20 June 2023	3 years, 192 days	Head of government	Executive
Katerina Sakellaropoulou		Greece	President	13 March 2020	13 March 2025	5 years, 0 days	Head of state	
Rose Christiane Raponda		Gabon	Prime Minister	16 July 2020	9 January 2023	2 years, 177 days	Head of government	
Victoire Tomegah Dogbé		Togo	Prime Minister	28 September 2020	3 May 2025	4 years, 217 days	Head of government	Executive (Note: Following the constitutional reform in March 2024 which transformed Togo from a presidential system to a parliamentary one and where the role of prime minister became the most powerful job in the country.)
Ingrida Šimonytė		Lithuania	Prime Minister	11 December 2020	12 December 2024	4 years, 1 day	Head of government	Executive
Kaja Kallas		Estonia	Prime Minister	26 January 2021	23 July 2024	3 years, 179 days	Head of government	Executive
Samia Suluhu Hassan		Tanzania	President	19 March 2021	Incumbent	5 years, 246 days	Head of state and government	Executive
Vjosa Osmani		Kosovo	President	4 April 2021	4 April 2026	5 years, 0 days	Head of state	
Fiamē Naomi Mataʻafa		Samoa	Prime Minister	24 May 2021	16 September 2025	4 years, 115 days	Head of government	Executive
Natalia Gavrilița		Moldova	Prime Minister	6 August 2021	16 February 2023	1 year, 194 days	Head of government	Executive
Najla Bouden		Tunisia	Prime Minister	11 October 2021	2 August 2023	1 year, 295 days	Head of government	Executive
Sandra Mason		Barbados	President	30 November 2021	29 November 2025	3 years, 364 days	Head of state	
Magdalena Andersson		Sweden	Prime Minister	30 November 2021	18 October 2022	322 days	Head of government	Executive
Xiomara Castro		Honduras	President	27 January 2022	27 January 2026	4 years, 0 days	Head of state and government	Executive
Katalin Novák		Hungary	President	10 May 2022	26 February 2024	1 year, 292 days	Head of state	
Élisabeth Borne		France	Prime Minister	16 May 2022	9 January 2024	1 year, 238 days	Head of government	
Droupadi Murmu		India	President	25 July 2022	Incumbent	4 years, 118 days	Head of state	
Liz Truss		United Kingdom	Prime Minister	6 September 2022	25 October 2022	49 days	Head of government	Executive
Giorgia Meloni		Italy	Prime Minister	22 October 2022	Incumbent	4 years, 29 days	Head of government	Executive
Dina Boluarte		Peru	President	7 December 2022	10 October 2025	2 years, 307 days	Head of state and government	Executive
Nataša Pirc Musar		Slovenia	President	23 December 2022	Incumbent	3 years, 332 days	Head of state	
Borjana Krišto		Bosnia and Herzegovina	Chairwoman of the Council of Ministers	25 January 2023	Incumbent	3 years, 299 days	Head of government	
Christine Kangaloo		Trinidad and Tobago	President	20 March 2023	Incumbent	3 years, 245 days	Head of state	
Evika Siliņa		Latvia	Prime Minister	15 September 2023	28 May 2026	2 years, 255 days	Head of government	
Sylvanie Burton		Dominica	President	2 October 2023	Incumbent	3 years, 49 days	Head of state	
Myriam Spiteri Debono		Malta	President	4 April 2024	Incumbent	2 years, 230 days	Head of state	
Gordana Siljanovska-Davkova		North Macedonia	President	12 May 2024	Incumbent	2 years, 192 days	Head of state	
Judith Suminwa		Congo, Democratic Republic of the	Prime Minister	12 June 2024	Incumbent	2 years, 161 days	Head of government	
Halla Tómasdóttir		Iceland	President	1 August 2024	Incumbent	2 years, 111 days	Head of state	
Paetongtarn Shinawatra		Thailand	Prime Minister	16 August 2024	29 August 2025; Suspended 1 July 2025	1 year, 13 days 319 days	Head of government	Executive
Claudia Sheinbaum		Mexico	President	1 October 2024	Incumbent	2 years, 50 days	Head of state and government	Executive
Kristrún Frostadóttir		Iceland	Prime Minister	21 December 2024	Incumbent	1 year, 334 days	Head of government	Executive
Ilza Amado Vaz		São Tomé and Príncipe	Prime Minister	9 January 2025	12 January 2025	3 days	Head of government	
Raffaella Petrini		Vatican City	President of the Governatore	1 March 2025	Incumbent	1 year, 264 days	Head of government	
Netumbo Nandi-Ndaitwah		Namibia	President	21 March 2025	Incumbent	1 year, 244 days	Head of state and government	Executive
Sara Zaafarani		Tunisia	Prime Minister	21 March 2025	Incumbent	1 year, 244 days	Head of government	
Brigitte Haas		Liechtenstein	Prime Minister	10 April 2025	Incumbent	1 year, 224 days	Head of government	
Jennifer Geerlings-Simons		Suriname	President	16 July 2025	Incumbent	1 year, 127 days	Head of state and government	Executive
Yulia Svyrydenko		Ukraine	Prime Minister	17 July 2025	16 July 2026	364 days	Head of government	
Inga Ruginienė		Lithuania	Prime Minister	25 September 2025	14 July 2026	292 days	Head of government	Executive
Sanae Takaichi		Japan	Prime Minister	21 October 2025	Incumbent	1 year, 30 days	Head of government	Executive
Catherine Connolly		Ireland	President	11 November 2025	Incumbent	1 year, 9 days	Head of state	
Iliana Iotova		Bulgaria	President	23 January 2026	Incumbent	301 days	Head of state	
Laura Fernández Delgado		Costa Rica	President	8 May 2026	Incumbent	196 days	Head of state and government	Executive
Keiko Fujimori		Peru	President	28 July 2026	Incumbent	115 days	Head of state and government	Executive
Fatima Ezzahra El Mansouri		Morocco	Prime Minister	29 September 2026	Incumbent	52 days	Head of government	Executive
Justina Shiroka Pula		Kosovo	President	7 October 2026	Incumbent	44 days	Head of state	
Ülle Madise		Estonia	President	12 October 2026	Incumbent	39 days	Head of state	

=== Elected or appointed acting/interim female chief executives ===
This list includes women elected or appointed in an acting capacity, wherein they assumed a vacated office on a temporary basis.

Incumbent

Name	Portrait	Country	Office	Mandate start	Mandate end	Term length	Head of state or government	
Sükhbaataryn Yanjmaa		Mongolia	Acting Chairman of the Presidium of the State Great Khural	7 September 1953	7 July 1954	303 days	Head of state	
Soong Ching-ling		China	Acting Co-chairperson	31 October 1968	24 April 1972	3 years, 176 days	Head of state	
Soong Ching-ling		China	Acting Chairperson	6 July 1976	5 March 1978	1 year, 242 days	Head of state	
Carmen Pereira		Guinea-Bissau	Acting President	14 May 1984	16 May 1984	2 days	Head of state	
Sylvie Kinigi		Burundi	Acting President	27 October 1993	5 February 1994	101 days	Head of state	
Reneta Indzhova		Bulgaria	Acting Prime Minister	17 October 1994	25 January 1995	100 days	Head of government	
Irena Degutienė		Lithuania	Acting Prime Minister	4 May 1999	18 May 1999	14 days	Head of government	
Irena Degutienė		Lithuania	Acting Prime Minister	27 October 1999	3 November 1999	7 days (Total Term: 21 days)	Head of government	
Nyam-Osoryn Tuyaa		Mongolia	Acting Prime Minister	22 July 1999	30 July 1999	8 days	Head of government	
Nino Burjanadze		Georgia	Acting President	23 November 2003	25 January 2004	63 days	Head of state	
Nino Burjanadze		Georgia	Acting President	25 November 2007	20 January 2008	56 days	Head of state	
Barbara Prammer		Austria	Co-Acting President	6 July 2004	8 July 2004	2 days	Head of state	
Radmila Šekerinska		Macedonia	Acting Prime Minister	12 May 2004	12 June 2004	31 days	Head of government	
Radmila Šekerinska		Macedonia	Acting Prime Minister	3 November 2004	15 December 2004	42 days (Total Term: 73 days)	Head of government	
Dalia Itzik		Israel	Acting President	25 January 2007	15 July 2007	171 days	Head of state	
Ivy Matsepe-Casaburri		South Africa	Acting President	25 September 2005		14 hours	Head of state and government	
Rose Francine Rogombé		Gabon	Acting President	10 June 2009	16 October 2009	128 days	Head of state	
Cécile Manorohanta		Madagascar	Acting Prime Minister	18 December 2009	20 December 2009	2 days	Head of government	
Adiato Djaló Nandigna		Guinea-Bissau	Acting Prime Minister	10 February 2012	12 April 2012	62 days	Head of government	
Monique Ohsan Bellepeau		Mauritius	Acting President	31 March 2012	21 July 2012	112 days	Head of state	
Monique Ohsan Bellepeau		Mauritius	Acting President	29 May 2015	5 June 2015	7 days (Total Term: 119 days)	Head of state	
Slavica Đukić Dejanović		Serbia	Acting President	5 April 2012	31 May 2012	56 days	Head of state	
Natalia Gherman		Moldova	Acting Prime Minister	22 June 2015	30 July 2015	38 days	Head of government	
Vassiliki Thanou		Greece	Acting Prime Minister	27 August 2015	21 September 2015	25 days	Head of government	
Maya Parnas		Transnistria	Acting Prime Minister	13 October 2015	30 November 2015	48 days	Head of government	
Maya Parnas		Transnistria	Acting Prime Minister	2 December 2015	23 December 2015	21 days (Total Term: 69 days)	Head of government	
Doris Bures		Austria	Co-Acting President of the National Council	8 July 2016	26 January 2017	202 days	Head of state	
Đặng Thị Ngọc Thịnh		Vietnam	Acting President	21 September 2018	23 October 2018	32 days	Head of state	
Vjosa Osmani		Kosovo	Acting President	5 November 2020	22 March 2021	137 days	Head of state	
Maya Tskitishvili		Georgia	Acting Prime Minister	18 February 2021	22 February 2021	4 days	Head of government	
Kamala Harris		United States	Acting President	19 November 2021	19 November 2021	1 hour 25 minutes	Head of state and government	
Võ Thị Ánh Xuân		Vietnam	Acting President	18 January 2023	2 March 2023	43 days	Head of state	
Võ Thị Ánh Xuân		Vietnam	Acting President	21 March 2024	22 May 2024	62 days (Total Term: 105 days)	Head of state	
Claudia Rodríguez de Guevara		El Salvador	Acting President	1 December 2023	1 June 2024	183 days	Head of state	
Isabelle Berro-Amadeï		Monaco	Acting Minister of State	10 January 2025	21 July 2025	192 days	Head of government	
Sushila Karki		Nepal	Interim Prime Minister	12 September 2025	27 March 2026	196 days	Head of government	
Delcy Rodríguez		Venezuela	Acting President	3 January 2026	Incumbent	321 days	Head of state and government	
Albulena Haxhiu		Kosovo	Acting President	4 April 2026	7 October 2026	186 days	Head of state	
Ágnes Forsthoffer		Hungary	Acting President	20 July 2026	19 August 2026	30 days	Head of state	
Janira Hopffer Almada		Cabo Verde	Acting President	15 September 2026	Incumbent	66 days	Head of state	
Ana Brnabić		Serbia	Acting President	28 September 2026	17 November 2026	50 days	Head of state	Executive

== Female members of collective head-of-state bodies ==
Incumbent

Name	Portrait	Country	Office	Mandate start	Mandate end	Term length	Head of state or government
Alexandra Kollontai		Soviet Russia	Member of the Council of People's Commissars	26 October 1917	23 February 1918	120 days	Member of the collective head of state
Nadezhda Krupskaya		Soviet Union	Member of the Presidium of the Supreme Soviet	12 December 1937	27 February 1939	1 year, 77 days	Member of the collective head of state
Klavdiya Nikolayeva		Soviet Union	Member of the Presidium of the Supreme Soviet	12 December 1937	10 February 1946	8 years, 60 days	Member of the collective head of state
Anna Pankratova		Soviet Union	Member of the Presidium of the Supreme Soviet	14 March 1954	25 May 1957	3 years, 41 days	Member of the collective head of state
Yekaterina Furtseva		Soviet Union	Member of the Presidium of the Supreme Soviet	12 March 1950	18 April 1962	12 years, 6 days	Member of the collective head of state
Alicja Musiałowa-Afanasjew		Poland	Member of the Council of State	20 November 1952	24 June 1965	12 years, 216 days	Member of the collective head of state
Yadgar Nasriddinova		Soviet Union	Member of the Presidium of the Supreme Soviet	24 March 1959	25 September 1970	11 years, 154 days	Member of the collective head of state
Luise Ermisch		East Germany	Member of the State Council	12 September 1960	13 November 1963	3 years, 62 days	Member of the collective head of state
Irmgard Neumann		East Germany	Member of the State Council	12 September 1960	13 November 1963	3 years, 62 days	Member of the collective head of state
Tursunoy Akhunova		Soviet Union	Member of the Presidium of the Supreme Soviet	18 April 1962	16 June 1974	12 years, 59 days	Member of the collective head of state
Lieselott Herforth		East Germany	Member of the State Council	13 November 1963	25 June 1981	17 years, 224 days	Member of the collective head of state
Else Merke		East Germany	Member of the State Council	13 November 1963	26 November 1971	8 years, 13 days	Member of the collective head of state
Brunhilde Hanke		East Germany	Member of the State Council	19 November 1964	5 April 1990	25 years, 137 days	Member of the collective head of state
Anni Neumann		East Germany	Member of the State Council	19 November 1964	26 November 1971	7 years, 7 days	Member of the collective head of state
Eugenia Krassowska-Jodłowska		Poland	Member of the Council of State	24 June 1965	28 March 1972	6 years, 278 days	Member of the collective head of state
Zoya Pukhova		Soviet Union	Member of the Presidium of the Supreme Soviet	12 June 1966	25 May 1989	22 years, 347 days	Member of the collective head of state
Maria Schneider		East Germany	Member of the State Council	13 July 1967	26 November 1971	4 years, 136 days	Member of the collective head of state
Margarete Müller		East Germany	Member of the State Council	26 November 1971	11 January 1990	18 years, 46 days	Member of the collective head of state
Ilse Thiele		East Germany	Member of the State Council	26 November 1971	11 January 1990	18 years, 46 days	Member of the collective head of state
Rosel Walther		East Germany	Member of the State Council	26 November 1971	5 April 1990	18 years, 130 days	Member of the collective head of state
Halina Koźniewska		Poland	Member of the Council of State	28 March 1972	2 April 1980	8 years, 5 days	Member of the collective head of state
Valentina Tereshkova		Soviet Union	Member of the Presidium of the Supreme Soviet	June 1974	March or April 1989	c. 14 years	Member of the collective head of state
Rimma Gavrilova		Soviet Union	Member of the Presidium of the Supreme Soviet	16 June 1974	4 March 1984	9 years, 293 days	Member of the collective head of state
Kamshat Donenbaeva		Soviet Union	Member of the Presidium of the Supreme Soviet	16 June 1974	25 May 1989	14 years, 343 days	Member of the collective head of state
Eugenia Kempara		Poland	Member of the Council of State	18 December 1976	6 November 1985	8 years, 323 days	Member of the collective head of state
Yekaterina Mukhina		Soviet Union	Member of the Presidium of the Supreme Soviet	4 March 1979	4 March 1984	5 years, 0 days	Member of the collective head of state
Violeta Chamorro		Nicaragua	Member of the Junta of National Reconstruction	18 July 1979	19 April 1980	276 days	Member of the collective head of state and government
Krystyna Marszałek-Młyńczyk		Poland	Member of the Council of State	2 April 1980	23 March 1983	2 years, 355 days	Member of the collective head of state
Maria Lea Pedini-Angelini		San Marino	Captain Regent	1 April 1981	1 October 1981	183 days	Member of the collective head of state
Johanna Töpfer		East Germany	Member of the State Council	25 June 1981	17 November 1989	8 years, 145 days	Member of the collective head of state
Gloriana Ranocchini		San Marino	Captain Regent	1 April 1984	1 October 1984	183 days	Member of the collective head of state
Gloriana Ranocchini		San Marino	Captain Regent	1 October 1989	1 April 1990	182 days	Member of the collective head of state
Elisabeth Kopp		Switzerland	Member of the Swiss Federal Council	21 October 1984	12 January 1989	4 years, 83 days	Member of the collective head of state and government
Elżbieta Gacek		Poland	Member of the Council of State	6 November 1985	17 June 1988	2 years, 224 days	Member of the collective head of state
Monika Werner		East Germany	Member of the State Council	16 June 1986	5 April 1990	3 years, 293 days	Member of the collective head of state
Eveline Klett		East Germany	Member of the State Council	16 June 1986	5 April 1990	3 years, 293 days	Member of the collective head of state
Edda Ceccoli		San Marino	Captain Regent	1 October 1991	1 April 1992	183 days	Member of the collective head of state
Biljana Plavšić		(Socialist Republic of Bosnia and Herzegovina) Bosnia and Herzegovina	Serb Member of the Presidency	1 March 1992	9 April 1992	39 days	Member of the collective head of state
Tatjana Ljujić-Mijatović		Bosnia and Herzegovina	Serb Member of the Presidency	24 December 1992	5 October 1996	3 years, 286 days	Member of the collective head of state
Ruth Dreifuss		Switzerland	Member of the Swiss Federal Council	1 April 1993	31 December 2002	9 years, 296 days	Member of the collective head of state and government
Patrizia Busignani		San Marino	Captain Regent	1 April 1993	1 October 1993	183 days	Member of the collective head of state
Ruth Metzler		Switzerland	Member of the Swiss Federal Council	1 January 1999	31 December 2003	4 years, 364 days	Member of the collective head of state and government
Rosa Zafferani		San Marino	Captain Regent	1 April 1999	1 October 1999	183 days	Member of the collective head of state
Rosa Zafferani		San Marino	Captain Regent	1 April 2008	1 October 2008	183 days	Member of the collective head of state
Maria Domenica Michelotti		San Marino	Captain Regent	1 April 2000	1 October 2000	183 days	Member of the collective head of state
Micheline Calmy-Rey		Switzerland	Member of the Swiss Federal Council	1 January 2003	31 December 2011	8 years, 364 days	Member of the collective head of state and government
Valeria Ciavatta		San Marino	Captain Regent	1 October 2003	1 April 2004	183 days	Member of the collective head of state
Valeria Ciavatta		San Marino	Captain Regent	1 April 2014	1 October 2014	183 days	Member of the collective head of state
Fausta Morganti		San Marino	Captain Regent	1 April 2005	1 October 2005	183 days	Member of the collective head of state
Doris Leuthard		Switzerland	Member of the Swiss Federal Council	1 August 2006	31 December 2018	12 years, 152 days	Member of the collective head of state and government
Eveline Widmer-Schlumpf		Switzerland	Member of the Swiss Federal Council	1 January 2008	31 December 2015	7 years, 364 days	Member of the collective head of state and government
Assunta Meloni		San Marino	Captain Regent	1 October 2008	1 April 2009	182 days	Member of the collective head of state
Simonetta Sommaruga		Switzerland	Member of the Swiss Federal Council	1 November 2010	31 December 2022	12 years, 60 days	Member of the collective head of state and government
Maria Luisa Berti		San Marino	Captain Regent	1 April 2011	1 October 2011	183 days	Member of the collective head of state
Maria Luisa Berti		San Marino	Captain Regent	1 October 2022	1 April 2023	182 days	Member of the collective head of state
Denise Bronzetti		San Marino	Captain Regent	1 October 2012	1 April 2013	182 days	Member of the collective head of state
Denise Bronzetti		San Marino	Captain Regent	1 April 2025	1 October 2025	183 days	Member of the collective head of state
Antonella Mularoni		San Marino	Captain Regent	1 April 2013	1 October 2013	183 days	Member of the collective head of state
Anna Maria Muccioli		San Marino	Captain Regent	1 October 2013	1 April 2014	182 days	Member of the collective head of state
Lorella Stefanelli		San Marino	Captain Regent	1 October 2015	1 April 2016	183 days	Member of the collective head of state
Mimma Zavoli		San Marino	Captain Regent	1 April 2017	1 October 2017	183 days	Member of the collective head of state
Vanessa D'Ambrosio		San Marino	Captain Regent	1 April 2017	1 October 2017	183 days	Member of the collective head of state
Karin Keller-Sutter		Switzerland	Member of the Swiss Federal Council	1 January 2019	Incumbent	7 years, 323 days	Member of the collective head of state and government
Viola Amherd		Switzerland	Member of the Swiss Federal Council	1 January 2019	1 April 2025	6 years, 90 days	Member of the collective head of state and government
Aisha Musa el-Said		Sudan	Member of the Sovereignty Council	21 August 2019	21 May 2021	1 year, 273 days	Member of the collective head of state
Raja Nicola		Sudan	Member of the Sovereignty Council	21 August 2019	Incumbent	7 years, 91 days	Member of the collective head of state
Mariella Mularoni		San Marino	Captain Regent	1 October 2019	1 April 2020	183 days	Member of the collective head of state
Grazia Zafferani		San Marino	Captain Regent	1 April 2020	1 October 2020	183 days	Member of the collective head of state
Željka Cvijanović		Bosnia and Herzegovina	Serb Member of the Presidency	16 November 2022	Incumbent	4 years, 4 days	Member of the collective head of state
Élisabeth Baume-Schneider		Switzerland	Member of the Swiss Federal Council	1 January 2023	Incumbent	3 years, 323 days	Member of the collective head of state and government
Adele Tonnini		San Marino	Captain Regent	1 April 2023	1 October 2023	183 days	Member of the collective head of state
Milena Gasperoni		San Marino	Captain Regent	1 April 2024	1 October 2024	183 days	Member of the collective head of state
Francesca Civerchia		San Marino	Captain Regent	1 October 2024	1 April 2025	182 days	Member of the collective head of state
Rosario Murillo		Nicaragua	Co-president	18 February 2025	Incumbent	1 year, 275 days	Member of the collective head of state and government
Alice Mina		San Marino	Captain Regent	1 April 2026	1 October 2026	183 days	Member of the collective head of state
Darijana Filipović		Bosnia and Herzegovina	Croat Member of the Presidency	16 November 2026	Incumbent	4 days	Member of the collective head of state

== Female viceregal representatives ==
Below are women who have been appointed representatives of heads of state, such as female governors-general and French representatives of Andorra. As governors-general are appointed representatives of the monarch of the Commonwealth realms (currently Charles III) and the French Representatives of Andorra are appointed representatives of the French Co-Prince of Andorra (currently Emmanuel Macron), they act as heads of state and carry out on a regular basis the functions and duties associated with such a role in the Commonwealth realms (excluding the United Kingdom, which has no governor-general, as the monarch of the Commonwealth realms primarily resides there) and Andorra, respectively.

Incumbent

Name	Portrait	Country	Office	Mandate start	Mandate end	Term length
Elmira Minita Gordon		Belize	Governor-General	21 September 1981	17 November 1993	12 years, 57 days
Jeanne Sauvé		Canada	Governor General	14 May 1984	29 January 1990	5 years, 260 days
Nita Barrow		Barbados	Governor-General	6 June 1990	19 December 1995	5 years, 196 days
Catherine Tizard		New Zealand	Governor-General	13 December 1990	21 March 1996	5 years, 99 days
Pearlette Louisy		Saint Lucia	Governor-General	17 September 1997	31 December 2017	20 years, 105 days
Adrienne Clarkson		Canada	Governor General	7 October 1999	27 September 2005	5 years, 324 days
Silvia Cartwright		New Zealand	Governor-General	4 April 2001	4 August 2006	5 years, 122 days
Ivy Dumont		The Bahamas	Governor-General	11 November 2001	30 November 2005	4 years, 19 days
Michaëlle Jean		Canada	Governor General	27 September 2005	1 October 2010	5 years, 4 days
Emmanuelle Mignon		Andorra	Representative of the French Co-Prince	6 June 2007	24 September 2008	1 year, 110 days
Louise Lake-Tack		Antigua and Barbuda	Governor-General	17 July 2007	13 August 2014	7 years, 27 days
Quentin Bryce		Australia	Governor-General	5 September 2008	28 March 2014	5 years, 204 days
Sylvie Hubac		Andorra	Representative of the French Co-Prince	15 May 2012	5 January 2015	2 years, 235 days
Cécile La Grenade		Grenada	Governor-General	7 May 2013	Incumbent	13 years, 197 days
Marguerite Pindling		The Bahamas	Governor-General	8 July 2014	28 June 2019	4 years, 355 days
Patsy Reddy		New Zealand	Governor-General	28 September 2016	28 September 2021	5 years, 0 days
Julie Payette		Canada	Governor General	2 October 2017	21 January 2021	3 years, 111 days
Sandra Mason		Barbados	Governor-General	8 January 2018	30 November 2021 (became inaugural president)	3 years, 326 days
Susan Dougan		Saint Vincent and the Grenadines	Governor-General	1 August 2019	5 January 2026	6 years, 157 days
Froyla Tzalam		Belize	Governor-General	27 May 2021	Incumbent	5 years, 177 days
Mary Simon		Canada	Governor General	26 July 2021	8 June 2026	4 years, 317 days
Cindy Kiro		New Zealand	Governor-General	21 October 2021	Incumbent	5 years, 30 days
Marcella Liburd		Saint Kitts and Nevis	Governor-General	1 February 2023	Incumbent	3 years, 292 days
Cynthia A. Pratt		The Bahamas	Governor-General	1 September 2023	Incumbent	3 years, 80 days
Sam Mostyn		Australia	Governor-General	1 July 2024	Incumbent	2 years, 142 days
Louise Arbour		Canada	Governor General	8 June 2026	Incumbent	165 days
Temukisa Auina Penehuro Hauma		Tuvalu	Governor General	30 September 2026	Incumbent	51 days

=== Acting female viceregal representatives ===
This list includes women appointed as viceregal representatives in an acting capacity, wherein they assumed a vacated office on a temporary basis under the terms of a dormant commission.

Incumbent

Name	Portrait	Country	Office	Mandate start	Mandate end	Term length
Dame Sian Elias		New Zealand	Administrator of the Government (Acting Governor-General)	22 March 2001	4 April 2001	13 days
Dame Sian Elias		New Zealand	Administrator of the Government (Acting Governor-General)	4 August 2006	23 August 2006	19 days
Dame Sian Elias		New Zealand	Administrator of the Government (Acting Governor-General)	23 August 2011	31 August 2011	8 days
Dame Sian Elias		New Zealand	Administrator of the Government (Acting Governor-General)	31 August 2016	28 September 2016	28 days
Dame Monica Dacon		Saint Vincent and the Grenadines	Acting Governor-General	3 June 2002	2 September 2002	91 days
Dame Sandra Mason		Barbados	Acting Governor-General	30 May 2012	1 June 2012	2 days
Teniku Talesi Honolulu		Tuvalu	Acting Governor-General	22 August 2019	15 January 2021	1 year, 146 days
Dame Helen Winkelmann		New Zealand	Administrator of the Government (Acting Governor-General)	28 September 2021	21 October 2021	23 days

== See also ==
- Matriarchy
- Women in government
- List of elected and appointed female deputy heads of state
- List of elected and appointed female deputy heads of government
- List of female monarchs
- List of female presidents in Latin America
