= List of elected and appointed female deputy heads of state =

This is a list of women who have been elected or appointed deputy head of state or deputy head of government of their respective countries.

== List ==
Denotes incumbent deputy head of state
- Italics denotes an acting deputy head of state (or deputy head of government) and states that are either de facto (with limited to no international recognition) or defunct.

Name	Image	Country	Continent	Office	Mandate start	Mandate end	Term length
Rosalia Zemlyachka		Soviet Union	Europe	Deputy Premier	8 May 1939	26 August 1943	4 years, 110 days
Wanda Wasilewska		Poland (Under wartime occupation)	Europe	Deputy Prime Minister (Polish Committee of National Liberation)	21 July 1944	31 December 1944	163 days
Ana Pauker		Romania	Europe	Deputy Prime Minister	1949	9 July 1952	3 years, 190 days
Soong Ching-ling		People's Republic of China	Asia	Deputy Chairperson	1 October 1949	27 September 1954	4 years, 361 days
Soong Ching-ling		People's Republic of China	Asia	Deputy Chairperson	27 April 1959	24 February 1972	12 years, 303 days
Ludmila Jankovcová		Czechoslovakia	Europe	Deputy Prime Minister	1954	1963	9 years, 0 days
Tyyne Leivo-Larsson		Finland	Europe	Deputy Prime Minister	26 April 1958	29 August 1958	125 days
Maria Paretti		Romania	Europe	Vice President	1961	1966	5 years, 0 days
Grete Wittkowski		East Germany	Europe	Deputy Prime Minister	9 February 1961	14 July 1967	6 years, 155 days
Constanța Crăciun		Romania	Europe	Vice President	1965	1969	4 years, 0 days
Barbara Castle		United Kingdom	Europe	First Secretary of State	6 April 1968	19 June 1970	2 years, 74 days
Isabel Perón		Argentina	South America	Vice President	12 October 1973	1 July 1974	262 days
Wu Guixian		China	Asia	Vice Premier	January 1975	September 1977	2 years, 243 days
Agatha Barbara		Malta	Europe	Deputy Prime Minister	18 September 1976	12 December 1981	5 years, 85 days
Chen Muhua		China	Asia	Vice Premier	1978	1982	4 years, 0 days
Maria Ciocan		Romania	Europe	Vice President	1980	1985	5 years, 0 days
Cornelia Filipas		Romania	Europe	Deputy Prime Minister	1980	1982	2 years, 0 days
Elena Ceaușescu		Romania	Europe	Deputy Prime Minister	29 March 1980	22 December 1989	9 years, 296 days
Colette Flesch		Luxembourg	Europe	Deputy Prime Minister	22 November 1980	20 July 1984	3 years, 241 days
Anahita Ratebzad		Afghanistan	Asia	Deputy Chairwoman of the Revolutionary Council	27 December 1980	24 November 1985	4 years, 332 days
Kim Pok-sin		North Korea	Asia	Vice Premier	1981	2002	21 years, 0 days
Mine Guri		Albania	Europe	Vice President	22 November 1982	1 September 1991	8 years, 283 days
Judit Csehák		Hungary	Europe	Deputy Prime Minister	6 December 1984	16 December 1987	3 years, 10 days
Maria Ghițulică		Romania	Europe	Vice President	1985	1989	4 years, 0 days
Viola Burnham		Guyana	South America	Co-Vice President; Deputy Prime Minister	6 August 1985	9 October 1991	6 years, 64 days
Aneta Spornic		Romania	Europe	Deputy Prime Minister	1986	1987	1 year, 0 days
Maria Mambo Café		Angola	Africa	Deputy Prime Minister	1986	1988	2 years, 0 days
Victoria Garrón Orozco		Costa Rica	North America	Second Vice President	8 May 1986	8 May 1990	4 years, 0 days
Lina Ciobanu		Romania	Europe	Deputy Prime Minister	1987	1989	2 years, 0 days
Nguyễn Thị Định		Vietnam	Asia	Vice President	19 April 1987	19 July 1992	5 years, 91 days
Aleksandra Biryukova		Soviet Union	Europe	Deputy Premier	1 October 1988	17 September 1990	1 year, 351 days
Helen Clark		New Zealand	Oceania	Deputy Prime Minister	8 August 1989	2 November 1990	1 year, 86 days
Christa Luft		East Germany	Europe	Deputy Prime Minister	13 November 1989	12 April 1990	150 days
Lena Hjelm-Wallén		Sweden	Europe	Acting Deputy Prime Minister	16 February 1990	27 February 1990	11 days
Lena Hjelm-Wallén		Sweden	Europe	Deputy Prime Minister	16 November 1995	21 October 2002	6 years, 339 days
Blaga Dimitrova		Bulgaria	Europe	Vice President	22 January 1992	6 July 1993	1 year, 165 days
Roza Otunbayeva		Kyrgyzstan	Asia	Deputy Prime Minister	26 February 1992	10 October 1992	227 days
Nguyễn Thị Bình		Vietnam	Asia	Vice President	8 October 1992	12 August 2002	9 years, 308 days
Mimi Jakobsen		Denmark	Europe	Deputy Prime Minister	21 January 1993	28 January 1994	1 year, 7 days
Marianne Jelved		Denmark	Europe	Deputy Prime Minister	25 January 1993	27 November 2001	8 years, 306 days
Sheila Copps		Canada	North America	Deputy Prime Minister	4 November 1993	30 April 1996	2 years, 178 days
Sheila Copps		Canada	North America	Deputy Prime Minister	19 June 1996	11 July 1997	1 year, 22 days
Guadalupe Jerezano Mejía		Honduras	North America	Third Vice President	27 January 1994	27 January 1998	4 years, 0 days
Rebeca Grynspan		Costa Rica	North America	Second Vice President	8 May 1994	8 May 1998	4 years, 0 days
Mona Sahlin		Sweden	Europe	Deputy Prime Minister	7 October 1994	16 November 1995	1 year, 40 days
Chandrika Kumaratunga		Sri Lanka	Asia	Prime Minister	19 August 1994	12 November 1994	85 days
Billie Miller		Barbados	North America	Deputy Prime Minister	12 September 1994	23 May 2003	8 years, 253 days
Sirimavo Bandaranaike		Sri Lanka	Asia	Prime Minister	14 November 1994	9 August 2000	5 years, 269 days
Specioza Kazibwe		Uganda	Africa	Vice President	18 November 1994	21 May 2003	8 years, 184 days
Katarína Tóthová		Slovakia	Europe	Deputy Prime Minister	13 December 1994	30 October 1998	3 years, 321 days
Julia Mena		Nicaragua	North America	Vice President	2 January 1995	2 January 1997	2 years, 0 days
Ljerka Mintas-Hodak		Croatia	Europe	Deputy Prime Minister	7 November 1995	27 January 2000	4 years, 81 days
Dilbar Ghulomova		Uzbekistan	Asia	Deputy Prime Minister	21 December 1995	12 December 2003	7 years, 356 days
Larisa Gutnichenko		Kyrgyzstan	Asia	Deputy Prime Minister	1996	1998	2 years, 0 days
Mira Jangaracheva		Kyrgyzstan	Asia	Deputy Prime Minister	1996	1998	2 years, 0 days
Tansu Çiller		Turkey	Europe	Deputy Prime Minister	28 June 1996	30 June 1997	1 year, 2 days
Rosalía Arteaga		Ecuador	South America	Vice President	10 August 1996	9 February 1997	183 days
Rosalía Arteaga		Ecuador	South America	Vice President	11 February 1997	30 March 1998	1 year, 47 days
Janet Jagan		Guyana	South America	Prime Minister and First Vice President	6 March 1997	19 December 1997	288 days
Isatou Njie-Saidy		The Gambia	Africa	Vice President	20 March 1997	18 January 2017	19 years, 304 days
Mary Harney		Ireland	Europe	Tánaiste	26 June 1997	13 September 2006	9 years, 78 days
Masoumeh Ebtekar		Iran	Asia	Vice President	2 August 1997	3 August 2005	8 years, 1 day
Masoumeh Ebtekar		Iran	Asia	Vice President	10 September 2013	1 September 2021	13 years, 44 days
Taufa Vakatela		Fiji	Oceania	Deputy Prime Minister	7 August 1997	19 May 1999	1 year, 285 days
Anne Enger Lahnstein		Norway	Europe	Acting Deputy Prime Minister	17 October 1997	8 October 1999	1 year, 356 days
Dosta Dimovska		Republic of Macedonia	Europe	Deputy Prime Minister	1998	2000	2 years, 0 days
Dosta Dimovska		Republic of Macedonia	Europe	Deputy Prime Minister	2001	2002	1 year, 0 days
Galina Saidova		Uzbekistan	Asia	Deputy Prime Minister	1998	2000	2 years, 0 days
Radmila Kiprijanova-Radovanoviḱ		Republic of Macedonia	Europe	Deputy Prime Minister	1998	1999	1 year, 0 days
Zlatka Popovska		Republic of Macedonia	Europe	Deputy Prime Minister	1998	1998	1 year
Gladys Caballero de Arevalo		Honduras	North America	Second Vice President	27 January 1998	27 January 2002	4 years, 0 days
Shailaja Acharya		Nepal	Asia	Deputy Prime Minister	15 April 1998	31 May 1999	1 year, 46 days
Astrid Fischel Volio		Costa Rica	North America	First Vice President	8 May 1998	8 May 2002	4 years, 0 days
Elizabeth Odio Benito		Costa Rica	North America	Second Vice President	8 May 1998	8 May 2002	4 years, 0 days
Gloria Macapagal Arroyo		Philippines	Asia	Vice President	30 June 1998	20 January 2001	2 years, 204 days
Annemarie Jorritsma		Netherlands	Europe	First Deputy Prime Minister	3 August 1998	22 July 2002	3 years, 353 days
Els Borst		Netherlands	Europe	Second Deputy Prime Minister	3 August 1998	22 July 2002	3 years, 353 days
Valentina Matviyenko		Russia	Europe	Deputy Prime Minister	24 September 1998	11 March 2003	4 years, 168 days
Makbule Çeço		Albania	Europe	Deputy Prime Minister	1999	2001	2 years, 0 days
Rima Khalaf		Jordan	Asia	Deputy Prime Minister	4 March 1999	19 June 2000	1 year, 107 days
Kuini Speed		Fiji	Oceania	Deputy Prime Minister	19 May 1999	27 May 2000	1 year, 8 days
Isabelle Durant		Belgium	Europe	Deputy Prime Minister	12 July 1999	12 July 2003	4 years, 0 days
Laurette Onkelinx		Belgium	Europe	Deputy Prime Minister	12 July 1999	12 July 2003	4 years, 0 days
Laurette Onkelinx		Belgium	Europe	Deputy Prime Minister	20 March 2008	11 October 2014	6 years, 205 days
Lydie Polfer		Luxembourg	Europe	Deputy Prime Minister	7 August 1999	31 July 2004	4 years, 359 days
Maja Gojković		Federal Republic of Yugoslavia	Europe	Deputy Prime Minister	12 August 1999	4 November 2000	1 year, 84 days
Megawati Sukarnoputri		Indonesia	Asia	Vice President	26 October 1999	23 July 2001	1 year, 289 days
Nigina Sharapova		Tajikistan	Asia	Deputy Prime Minister	2 December 1999	20 December 2004	5 years, 18 days
Lidia Guțu		Moldova	Europe	Deputy Prime Minister	21 December 1999	19 April 2001	1 year, 119 days
Yulia Tymoshenko		Ukraine	Europe	Vice Prime Minister	30 December 1999	19 January 2001	1 year, 20 days
Željka Antunović		Croatia	Europe	Deputy Prime Minister	27 January 2000	23 December 2003	3 years, 330 days
Susanne Riess-Passer		Austria	Europe	Vice-Chancellor	4 February 2000	28 February 2003	3 years, 24 days
Annette Lu		Taiwan (Republic of China)	Asia	Vice President	20 May 2000	20 May 2008	8 years, 0 days
Milagros Ortiz Bosch		Dominican Republic	North America	Vice President	16 August 2000	16 August 2004	4 years, 0 days
Adina Bastidas		Venezuela	South America	Vice President	24 December 2000	13 January 2002	1 year, 20 days
Mária Kadlečíková		Slovakia	Europe	Deputy Prime Minister	2001	16 October 2002	1 year, 288 days
Sandra Pierantozzi		Palau	Oceania	Vice President	19 January 2001	1 January 2005	3 years, 348 days
Teimumu Kepa		Fiji	Oceania	Deputy Prime Minister	15 March 2001	5 December 2006	5 years, 265 days
Rita Kieber-Beck		Liechtenstein	Europe	Deputy Prime Minister	5 April 2001	21 April 2005	4 years, 16 days
Lydia Shuleva		Bulgaria	Europe	Deputy Prime Minister	24 July 2001	17 August 2005	4 years, 24 days
Sima Samar		Afghanistan	Asia	Vice Chairwoman of Interim Administration	22 December 2001	19 June 2002	179 days
Armida Villela de López Contreras		Honduras	North America	Second Vice President	27 January 2002	27 January 2006	4 years, 0 days
Manuela Ferreira Leite		Portugal	Europe	Minister of State and of Finance	6 April 2002	17 July 2004	2 years, 102 days
Cynthia Pratt		Bahamas	North America	Deputy Prime Minister	3 May 2002	4 May 2005	3 years, 1 day
Cynthia Pratt		Bahamas	North America	Deputy Prime Minister	6 June 2005	4 May 2007	1 year, 332 days
Lineth Saborío Chaverri		Costa Rica	North America	First Vice President	8 May 2002	8 May 2006	4 years, 0 days
Ermelinda Meksi		Albania	Europe	Deputy Prime Minister	29 June 2002	29 December 2003	1 year 5 months
Chang Sang		South Korea	Asia	Acting Prime Minister	11 July 2002	31 July 2002	20 days
Trương Mỹ Hoa		Vietnam	Asia	Vice President	12 August 2002	25 July 2007	4 years, 347 days
Margareta Winberg		Sweden	Europe	Deputy Prime Minister	21 October 2002	31 October 2003	1 year, 10 days
Radmila Šekerinska		Republic of Macedonia	Europe	Deputy Prime Minister	1 November 2002	27 August 2006	3 years, 299 days
Fransisca Pereira Gomes		Guinea-Bissau	Africa	Deputy Prime Minister	17 November 2002	14 September 2003	301 days
Angèle Gnonsoa		Côte d'Ivoire	Africa	Deputy Prime Minister	10 February 2003	7 December 2005	2 years, 300 days
Henriette Diabaté		Côte d'Ivoire	Africa	Deputy Prime Minister	10 February 2003	7 December 2005	2 years, 300 days
Wu Yi		China	Asia	Second Vice Premier	15 March 2003	2 June 2007	4 years, 79 days
Wu Yi		China	Asia	Acting First Vice Premier	2 June 2007	17 March 2008	289 days
Galina Karelova		Russia	Europe	Deputy Prime Minister	24 April 2003	24 February 2004	306 days
Mia Mottley		Barbados	North America	Deputy Prime Minister	23 May 2003	15 January 2008	4 years, 237 days
Beatriz Merino		Peru	South America	Prime Minister	23 June 2003	15 December 2003	175 days
Teima Onorio		Kiribati	Oceania	Vice President	10 July 2003	12 March 2016	12 years, 246 days
Marita Ulvskog		Sweden	Europe	Acting Deputy Prime Minister	31 October 2003	1 June 2004	214 days
Anne McLellan		Canada	North America	Deputy Prime Minister	12 December 2003	6 February 2006	2 years, 56 days
Jadranka Kosor		Croatia	Europe	Deputy Prime Minister	23 December 2003	6 July 2009	5 years, 195 days
Khayrinisso Mavlonova		Tajikistan	Asia	Deputy Prime Minister	2004	23 November 2013	9 years, 326 days
Svetlana Inamova		Uzbekistan	Asia	Deputy Prime Minister	2004	2008	4 years, 0 days
Toktobubu Aytikeeva		Kyrgyzstan	Asia	Deputy Prime Minister	2004	2005	1 year, 0 days
Tamar Beruchashvili		Georgia	Europe	Deputy Prime Minister	17 February 2004	27 December 2004	314 days
María Teresa Fernández de la Vega		Spain	Europe	First Deputy Prime Minister	18 April 2004	20 October 2010	6 years, 185 days
Izabela Jaruga-Nowacka		Poland	Europe	Deputy Prime Minister	2 May 2004	31 October 2005	1 year, 121 days
Byrganym Aitimova		Kazakhstan	Asia	Deputy Prime Minister	15 May 2004	13 December 2005	1 year, 6 months
Yeh Chu-lan		Taiwan (Republic of China)	Asia	Vice Premier	20 May 2004	21 February 2005	277 days
Ana Vilma de Escobar		El Salvador	North America	Vice President	1 June 2004	1 June 2009	5 years, 0 days
Luísa Diogo		Mozambique	Africa	Prime Minister	17 August 2004	16 January 2010	5 years, 152 days
Laila Freivalds		Sweden	Europe	Acting Deputy Prime Minister	1 October 2004	1 November 2004	31 days
Joice Mujuru		Zimbabwe	Africa	Vice President	6 December 2004	8 December 2014	10 years, 2 days
Ishengul Boljurova		Kyrgyzstan	Asia	Deputy Prime Minister	25 March 2005	15 August 2005	143 days
Phumzile Mlambo-Ngcuka		South Africa	Africa	Deputy President	22 June 2005	24 September 2008	3 years, 94 days
Fatemeh Javadi		Iran	Asia	Vice President	3 August 2005	5 August 2009	4 years, 2 days
Emel Etem Toshkova		Bulgaria	Europe	Deputy Prime Minister	17 August 2005	27 July 2009	3 years, 344 days
Alice Nzomukunda		Burundi	Africa	Vice President	29 August 2005	5 September 2006	1 year, 7 days
Zinaida Greceanîi		Moldova	Europe	First Deputy Prime Minister	10 October 2005	31 March 2008	2 years, 173 days
Freya Van den Bossche		Belgium	Europe	Deputy Prime Minister	15 October 2005	21 December 2007	2 years, 67 days
Constance Simelane		Swaziland	Africa	Deputy Prime Minister	2006	23 October 2008	2 years, 296 days
Zyta Gilowska		Poland	Europe	Deputy Prime Minister	7 January 2006	24 June 2006	168 days
Zyta Gilowska		Poland	Europe	Deputy Prime Minister	22 September 2006	7 September 2007	350 days
Zyta Gilowska		Poland	Europe	Deputy Prime Minister	10 September 2007	16 November 2007	67 days
Georgette Koko		Gabon	Africa	Deputy Prime Minister	20 January 2006	17 July 2009	3 years, 178 days
Tsai Ing-wen		Taiwan (Republic of China)	Asia	Vice Premier	25 January 2006	21 May 2008	1 year, 116 days
Lucia Žitňanská		Slovakia	Europe	Deputy Prime Minister	8 February 2006	4 July 2006	146 days
Lucia Žitňanská		Slovakia	Europe	Deputy Prime Minister	23 March 2016	22 March 2018	1 year, 364 days
Najah al-Attar		Syria	Asia	Vice President	23 March 2006	8 December 2024	18 years, 260 days
Maria Tebús		São Tomé and Príncipe	Africa	Deputy Prime Minister	21 April 2006	14 February 2008	1 year, 299 days
Tzipi Livni		Israel	Asia	Deputy Prime Minister	4 May 2006	31 March 2009	2 years, 331 days
Dalia Itzik		Israel	Asia	Designated Acting President	4 May 2006	30 March 2009	2 years, 330 days
Laura Chinchilla		Costa Rica	North America	First Vice President	8 May 2006	8 October 2008	2 years, 153 days
Ivana Dulić-Marković		Serbia	Europe	Deputy Prime Minister	20 June 2006	9 November 2006	142 days
Lourdes Mendoza		Peru	South America	Second Vice President	28 July 2006	28 July 2011	5 years, 0 days
Gabriela Konevska-Trajkovska		Republic of Macedonia	Europe	Deputy Prime Minister	27 August 2006	26 July 2008	1 year, 334 days
Marina Barampama		Burundi	Africa	Vice President	8 September 2006	8 February 2007	153 days
Maud Olofsson		Sweden	Europe	Deputy Prime Minister	6 October 2006	5 October 2010	3 years, 364 days
Gordana Đurović		Montenegro	Europe	Deputy Prime Minister	10 November 2006	11 June 2009	2 years, 213 days
Nguyễn Thị Doan		Vietnam	Asia	Vice President	25 July 2007	8 April 2016	8 years, 258 days
Julia Gillard		Australia	Oceania	Deputy Prime Minister	3 December 2007	24 June 2010	2 years, 203 days
Elmira Ibraimova		Kyrgyzstan	Asia	Deputy Prime Minister	2008	2010	2 years, 0 days
Farida Akbarova		Uzbekistan	Asia	Deputy Prime Minister	2008	2011	3 years, 0 days
Honorine Dossou-Naki		Gabon	Africa	Deputy Prime Minister	2008	17 July 2009	1 year, 197 days
Đurđa Adlešič		Croatia	Europe	Deputy Prime Minister	12 January 2008	12 October 2010	2 years, 273 days
Joëlle Milquet		Belgium	Europe	Deputy Prime Minister	20 March 2008	26 April 2010	2 years, 37 days
Meglena Plugchieva		Bulgaria	Europe	Deputy Prime Minister	24 April 2008	29 July 2009	1 year, 96 days
Mary Coughlan		Ireland	Europe	Tánaiste	7 May 2008	9 March 2011	2 years, 306 days
Baleka Mbete		South Africa	Africa	Deputy President	25 September 2008	9 May 2009	1 year, 107 days
Lene Espersen		Denmark	Europe	Deputy Prime Minister	10 September 2008	13 January 2011	2 years, 125 days
Men Sam An		Cambodia	Asia	Deputy Prime Minister	25 September 2008	22 August 2023	14 years, 331 days
Vlasta Parkanová		Czech Republic	Europe	First Deputy Prime Minister	23 January 2009	8 May 2009	105 days
Thokozani Khuphe		Zimbabwe	Africa	Deputy Prime Minister	11 February 2009	11 September 2013	4 years, 212 days
Elena Salgado		Spain	Europe	Second Deputy Prime Minister	7 April 2009	11 July 2011	2 years, 95 days
Elena Salgado		Spain	Europe	First Deputy Prime Minister	11 July 2011	22 December 2011	164 days
Ndéye Khady Diop		Senegal	Africa	Deputy Prime Minister	30 April 2009	5 April 2012	2 years, 341 days
Joyce Banda		Malawi	Africa	Vice President	29 May 2009	7 April 2012	2 years, 312 days
Viera Petriková		Slovakia	Europe	Deputy Prime Minister	3 July 2009	8 July 2010	1 year, 5 days
Fatemeh Bodaghi		Iran	Asia	Vice President	21 September 2009	10 September 2013	3 years, 354 days
Farahnaz Torkestani		Iran	Asia	Vice President	21 September 2009	10 September 2013	3 years, 354 days
Maryam Mojtahedzadeh		Iran	Asia	Vice President	21 September 2009	8 October 2013	4 years, 17 days
Nasrin Soltankhah		Iran	Asia	Vice President	21 September 2009	10 September 2013	3 years, 354 days
Cécile Manorohanta		Madagascar	Africa	Deputy Prime Minister	10 October 2009	18 December 2009	69 days
Cécile Manorohanta		Madagascar	Africa	Deputy Prime Minister	20 December 2009	2 November 2011	1 year, 317 days
Sujata Koirala		Nepal	Asia	Deputy Prime Minister	12 October 2009	6 February 2011	1 year, 117 days
Tazhikan Kalimbetova		Kyrgyzstan	Asia	Deputy Prime Minister	21 October 2009	7 April 2010	168 days
Uktomkhan Abdullaeva		Kyrgyzstan	Asia	Deputy Prime Minister	21 October 2009	7 April 2010	168 days
Uktomkhan Abdullaeva		Kyrgyzstan	Asia	Deputy Prime Minister	17 December 2010	23 September 2011	280 days
María Antonieta de Bográn		Honduras	North America	First Vice President	27 January 2010	27 January 2014	4 years, 0 days
Han Kwang-bok		North Korea	Asia	Vice Premier	7 June 2010	2012	2 years, 207 days
Kim Rak-hui		North Korea	Asia	Vice Premier	7 June 2010	April 2012	2 years, 207 days
Hannelore Kraft		Germany	Europe	President of the Bundesrat	1 November 2010	31 October 2011	1 year, 293 days
Monique Ohsan Bellepeau		Mauritius	Africa	Vice President	12 November 2010	4 April 2016	5 years, 144 days
Eka Tkeshelashvili		Georgia	Asia	Deputy Prime Minister	20 November 2010	25 October 2012	1 year, 340 days
Awa Ndiaye		Côte d'Ivoire	Africa	Deputy Prime Minister	6 December 2010	13 March 2012	1 year, 98 days
Innocence Ntap		Côte d'Ivoire	Africa	Deputy Prime Minister	6 December 2010	13 March 2012	1 year, 98 days
Girlyn Miguel		Saint Vincent and the Grenadines	North America	Deputy Prime Minister	19 December 2010	14 December 2015	4 years, 360 days
Penda Diallo		Guinea	Africa	Deputy Prime Minister	24 December 2010	29 December 2015	5 years, 5 days
Elmira Basitkhanova		Uzbekistan	Asia	Deputy Prime Minister	2011	14 December 2016	5 years, 348 days
Teuta Arifi		Republic of Macedonia	Europe	Deputy Prime Minister	2011	2013	2 years, 0 days
Edita Tahiri		Kosovo	Europe	Deputy Prime Minister	23 February 2011	9 December 2014	3 years, 289 days
Mimoza Kusari-Lila		Kosovo	Europe	Deputy Prime Minister	23 February 2011	2 October 2013	2 years, 221 days
Verica Kalanović		Serbia	Europe	Deputy Prime Minister	14 March 2011	27 July 2012	1 year, 135 days
Rosario Fernández		Peru	South America	Prime Minister	19 March 2011	28 July 2011	131 days
Cristina Fontes Lima		Cape Verde	Africa	Deputy Prime Minister	21 March 2011	22 April 2016	5 years, 32 days
Assunção Esteves		Portugal	Europe	President of Parliament	21 June 2011	22 October 2015	4 years, 123 days
Jutta Urpilainen		Finland	Europe	Deputy Prime Minister	22 June 2011	6 June 2014	2 years, 349 days
Karolína Peake		Czech Republic	Europe	Deputy Prime Minister	1 July 2011	10 July 2013	2 years, 9 days
Susan Denham		Ireland	Europe	Chief Justice	25 July 2011	28 July 2017	6 years, 3 days
Marisol Espinoza		Peru	South America	First Vice President	28 July 2011	28 July 2016	5 years, 0 days
Margrethe Vestager		Denmark	Europe	Deputy Prime Minister	3 October 2011	2 September 2014	2 years, 334 days
Indira Vardania		Abkhazia	Europe	First Vice Premier	10 October 2011	3 June 2014	2 years, 236 days
Gulnara Asymbekova		Kyrgyzstan	Asia	Deputy Prime Minister	14 November 2011	25 March 2014	2 years, 131 days
Meherzia Labidi Maïza		Tunisia	Africa	First Vice-president of the Constituent Assembly of Tunisia	22 November 2011	2 December 2014	3 years, 10 days
Soraya Sáenz de Santamaría		Spain	Europe	First Deputy Prime Minister	22 December 2011	1 June 2018	6 years, 161 days
Milanka Opačić		Croatia	Europe	Deputy Prime Minister	23 December 2011	22 January 2016	4 years, 30 days
Roxana Baldetti		Guatemala	North America	Vice President	14 January 2012	8 May 2015	3 years, 114 days
Han Myeong-sook		South Korea	Asia	Prime Minister	16 January 2012	12 April 2012	87 days
Margarita Popova		Bulgaria	Europe	Vice President	22 January 2012	22 January 2017	5 years, 0 days
Alla Dzhioyeva		South Ossetia	Europe	Deputy Prime Minister	23 May 2012	21 April 2017	4 years, 333 days
Maya Parnas		Transnistria	Europe	Deputy Prime Minister	24 January 2012	23 December 2015	3 years, 333 days
Natalia Nikiforova		Transnistria	Europe	Deputy Prime Minister	24 January 2012	2012	?
Natalia Rusanova		Transnistria	Europe	Deputy Prime Minister	24 January 2012	2012	?
Nina Shtanski		Transnistria	Europe	Deputy Prime Minister	24 January 2012	14 September 2015	3 years, 233 days
Tatiana Turanskaya		Transnistria	Europe	Deputy Prime Minister	24 January 2012	10 July 2013	1 year, 167 days
Raisa Bogatyrova		Ukraine	Europe	Vice Prime Minister	14 February 2012	23 February 2014	2 years, 9 days
Kamila Talieva		Kyrgyzstan	Asia	Deputy Prime Minister	5 September 2012	25 March 2014	1 year, 201 days
Olga Golodets		Russia	Europe	Deputy Prime Minister	21 May 2012	21 January 2020	7 years, 245 days
Suzana Grubješić		Serbia	Europe	Deputy Prime Minister	27 July 2012	2 September 2013	1 year, 37 days
Margarita Cedeño		Dominican Republic	North America	Vice President	16 August 2012	16 August 2020	8 years, 0 days
Fowsiyo Yussuf Haji Aadan		Somalia	Africa	Deputy Prime Minister	4 November 2012	17 January 2014	1 year, 74 days
Suheir Atassi		Syrian Arab Republic (opposition)	Asia	Vice President of the National Coalition	12 November 2012	4 January 2015	2 years, 53 days
Vesna Pusić		Croatia	Europe	First Deputy Prime Minister	16 November 2012	22 January 2016	3 years, 67 days
Gladys María Bejerano Portela		Cuba	North America	Vice President	24 February 2013	10 October 2019	6 years, 228 days
Mercedes López Acea		Cuba	North America	Vice President	24 February 2013	19 April 2018	5 years, 54 days
Deyana Kostadinova		Bulgaria	Europe	Acting Deputy Prime Minister	13 March 2013	29 May 2013	77 days
Ekaterina Zaharieva		Bulgaria	Europe	Acting Deputy Prime Minister	13 March 2013	29 May 2013	77 days
Ekaterina Zaharieva		Bulgaria	Europe	Acting Deputy Prime Minister	6 August 2014	7 November 2014	93 days
Ekaterina Zaharieva		Bulgaria	Europe	Deputy Prime Minister	4 May 2017	12 May 2021	4 years, 8 days
Iliyana Tsanova		Bulgaria	Europe	Acting Deputy Prime Minister	13 March 2013	29 May 2013	77 days
Iliyana Tsanova		Bulgaria	Europe	Acting Deputy Prime Minister	6 August 2014	7 November 2014	93 days
Liu Yandong		China	Asia	Second Vice Premier	16 March 2013	19 March 2018	5 years, 3 days
Daniela Bobeva		Bulgaria	Europe	Deputy Prime Minister	29 May 2013	6 August 2014	1 year, 69 days
Zinaida Zlatanova		Bulgaria	Europe	Deputy Prime Minister	29 May 2013	6 August 2014	1 year, 69 days
Tatiana Potîng		Moldova	Europe	Deputy Prime Minister	30 May 2013	18 February 2015	1 year, 263 days
Natalia Gherman		Moldova	Europe	Deputy Prime Minister	30 May 2013	20 January 2016	2 years, 235 days
Maria Luís Albuquerque		Portugal	Europe	Minister of State and of Finance	2 July 2013	24 July 2013	22 days
Elham Aminzadeh		Iran	Asia	Vice President	11 August 2013	12 July 2016	2 years, 336 days
Shahindokht Molaverdi		Iran	Asia	Vice President	8 October 2013	9 August 2017	3 years, 305 days
Elżbieta Bieńkowska		Poland	Europe	Deputy Prime Minister	27 November 2013	22 September 2014	299 days
Gulshara Abdykhalikova		Kazakhstan	Asia	Deputy Prime Minister	28 November 2013	11 November 2014	348 days
Ava Rossana Guevara		Honduras	North America	Second Vice President	27 January 2014	27 January 2018	4 years, 0 days
Lorena Enriqueta Herrera Estevez		Honduras	North America	Third Vice President	27 January 2014	27 January 2018	4 years, 0 days
Elmira Sarieva		Kyrgyzstan	Asia	Deputy Prime Minister	25 March 2014	1 May 2015	1 year, 37 days
Aster Mamo		Ethiopia	Africa	Deputy Prime Minister	8 April 2014	1 November 2016	2 years, 207 days
Kori Udovički		Serbia	Europe	Deputy Prime Minister	27 April 2014	11 August 2016	2 years, 106 days
Zorana Mihajlović		Serbia	Europe	Deputy Prime Minister	27 April 2014	26 October 2022	8 years, 182 days
Ana Helena Chacón		Costa Rica	North America	Second Vice President	8 May 2014	8 May 2018	4 years, 0 days
Isabel Saint Malo		Panama	North America	Vice President	1 July 2014	1 July 2019	5 years, 0 days
Joan Burton		Ireland	Europe	Tánaiste	4 July 2014	6 May 2016	1 year, 307 days
Ana Jara		Peru	South America	Prime Minister	22 July 2014	2 April 2015	254 days
Violeta Bulc		Slovenia	Europe	Deputy Prime Minister	18 September 2014	19 November 2014	62 days
Åsa Romson		Sweden	Europe	Deputy Prime Minister	3 October 2014	25 May 2016	1 year, 235 days
Margot Wallström		Sweden	Europe	Acting Deputy Prime Minister	3 October 2014	10 September 2019	4 years, 342 days
Meglena Kuneva		Bulgaria	Europe	Deputy Prime Minister	7 November 2014	27 January 2017	2 years, 81 days
Rumyana Bachvarova		Bulgaria	Europe	Deputy Prime Minister	7 November 2014	27 January 2017	2 years, 81 days
Csilla Hegedüs		Romania	Europe	Deputy Prime Minister	24 November 2014	13 December 2014	19 days
Damira Niyazalieva		Kyrgyzstan	Asia	Deputy Prime Minister	27 December 2014	1 May 2015	125 days
Natalya Kochanova		Belarus	Europe	Deputy Prime Minister	27 December 2014	21 December 2016	1 year, 360 days
Noura al-Ameer		Syrian Arab Republic (opposition)	Asia	Vice President of the National Coalition	4 January 2015	5 March 2016	1 year, 61 days
Marie-Noëlle Koyara		Central African Republic	Africa	Minister of State	17 January 2015	2 April 2016	1 year, 76 days
Inonge Wina		Zambia	Africa	Vice President	26 January 2015	24 August 2021	6 years, 210 days
Saara Kuugongelwa		Namibia	Africa	Prime Minister	21 March 2015	21 March 2025	10 years, 0 days
Gulmira Kudaiberdieva		Kyrgyzstan	Asia	Deputy Prime Minister	1 May 2015	11 November 2016	1 year, 192 days
Dariga Nazarbayeva		Kazakhstan	Asia	Deputy Prime Minister	11 September 2015	13 September 2016	1 year, 2 days
Samia Suluhu Hassan		Tanzania	Africa	Vice President	5 November 2015	19 March 2021	5 years, 134 days
Gabriela Michetti		Argentina	South America	Vice President	10 December 2015	10 December 2019	4 years, 0 days
Samira al-Masalma		Syrian Arab Republic (opposition)	Asia	Vice President of the National Coalition	5 March 2016	6 May 2017	1 year, 62 days
Fiamē Naomi Mataʻafa		Samoa	Oceania	Deputy Prime Minister	21 March 2016	11 September 2020	4 years, 174 days
Đặng Thị Ngọc Thịnh		Vietnam	Asia	Vice President	8 April 2016	6 April 2021	4 years, 363 days
Ivanna Klympush-Tsintsadze		Ukraine	Europe	Vice Prime Minister	14 April 2016	29 August 2019	3 years, 137 days
Frances Fitzgerald		Ireland	Europe	Tánaiste	6 May 2016	28 November 2017	1 year, 206 days
Isabella Lövin		Sweden	Europe	Deputy Prime Minister	25 May 2016	5 February 2021	4 years, 256 days
Azra Jasavić		Montenegro	Europe	Deputy Prime Minister	2 June 2016	28 November 2016	179 days
Leni Robredo		Philippines	Asia	Vice President	30 June 2016	30 June 2022	6 years, 0 days
Mercedes Aráoz		Peru	South America	Second Vice President	28 July 2016	23 March 2018	1 year, 238 days
Mercedes Aráoz		Peru	South America	Prime Minister	17 September 2017	2 April 2018	259 days
Mercedes Aráoz		Peru	South America	First Vice President	23 March 2018	7 May 2020	2 years, 45 days
Martina Dalić		Croatia	Europe	Deputy Prime Minister	19 October 2016	14 May 2018	1 year, 207 days
Malu Dreyer		Germany	Europe	President of the Bundesrat	1 November 2016	31 October 2017	364 days
Zahra Ahmadipour		Iran	Asia	Vice President	6 November 2016	13 August 2017	280 days
Cholpon Sultanbekova		Kyrgyzstan	Asia	Deputy Prime Minister	11 November 2016	20 April 2018	1 year, 160 days
Paula Bennett		New Zealand	Oceania	Deputy Prime Minister	12 December 2016	26 October 2017	318 days
Tatyana Kirova		Transnistria	Europe	Deputy Prime Minister	17 December 2016	Incumbent	9 years, 311 days
Sevil Shhaideh		Romania	Europe	Deputy Prime Minister	4 January 2017	16 June 2017	163 days
Sevil Shhaideh		Romania	Europe	Deputy Prime Minister	29 June 2017	17 October 2017	110 days
Rosario Murillo		Nicaragua	North America	Vice President	10 January 2017	30 January 2025	8 years, 20 days
Iliana Iotova		Bulgaria	Europe	Vice President	22 January 2017	23 January 2026	9 years, 1 day
Denitsa Zlateva		Bulgaria	Europe	Acting Deputy Prime Minister	27 January 2017	4 May 2017	97 days
Malina Krumova		Bulgaria	Europe	Acting Deputy Prime Minister	27 January 2017	4 May 2017	97 days
Mehriban Aliyeva		Azerbaijan	Asia	Vice President	21 February 2017	Incumbent	9 years, 245 days
Fatoumata Tambajang		The Gambia	Africa	Vice President	22 February 2017	29 June 2018	1 year, 127 days
Grațiela-Leocadia Gavrilescu		Romania	Europe	Deputy Prime Minister	3 April 2017	16 June 2017	74 days
Grațiela-Leocadia Gavrilescu		Romania	Europe	Deputy Prime Minister	29 June 2017	4 November 2019	2 years, 128 days
Mariyana Nikolova		Bulgaria	Europe	Deputy Prime Minister	4 May 2017	12 May 2021	4 years, 8 days
Salwa Aksoy		Syrian Arab Republic (opposition)	Asia	Vice President of the National Coalition	6 May 2017	6 May 2018	1 year, 0 days
Ledina Mandia		Albania	Europe	Deputy Prime Minister	22 May 2017	11 September 2017	112 days
Marija Pejčinović Burić		Croatia	Europe	Deputy Prime Minister	19 June 2017	19 July 2019	2 years, 30 days
Laya Jonaidi		Iran	Asia	Vice President	9 August 2017	1 September 2021	9 years, 76 days
Senida Mesi		Albania	Europe	Deputy Prime Minister	11 September 2017	17 January 2019	1 year, 128 days
Lucía Topolansky		Uruguay	South America	Vice President	13 September 2017	1 March 2020	2 years, 170 days
María Alejandra Vicuña		Ecuador	South America	Vice President	4 October 2017	4 December 2018	1 year, 61 days
Kajsa Ollongren		Netherlands	Europe	Second Deputy Prime Minister	26 October 2017	1 November 2019	2 years, 6 days
Kajsa Ollongren		Netherlands	Europe	Second Deputy Prime Minister	4 May 2020	10 January 2022	1 year, 251 days
Carola Schouten		Netherlands	Europe	Third Deputy Prime Minister	26 October 2017	2 July 2024	6 years, 250 days
Fazila Jeewa-Daureeawoo		Mauritius	Africa	Vice Prime Minister	16 November 2017	6 November 2019	1 year, 355 days
Beata Szydło		Poland	Europe	Deputy Prime Minister	11 December 2017	4 June 2019	1 year, 175 days
Cristina Lesnic		Moldova	Europe	Deputy Prime Minister	10 January 2018	8 June 2019	1 year, 149 days
Cristina Lesnic		Moldova	Europe	Deputy Prime Minister	16 March 2020	9 November 2020	238 days
Jewel Taylor		Liberia	Africa	Vice President	22 January 2018	22 January 2024	6 years, 0 days
Olga Margarita Alvarado Rodríguez		Honduras	North America	Second Vice President	27 January 2018	27 January 2022	4 years, 0 days
María Antonia Rivera		Honduras	North America	Third Vice President	27 January 2018	27 January 2022	4 years, 0 days
Ana Birchall		Romania	Europe	Deputy Prime Minister	29 January 2018	4 November 2019	1 year, 279 days
Sun Chunlan		China	Asia	Second Vice Premier	19 March 2018	11 March 2023	4 years, 357 days
Gabriela Matečná		Slovakia	Europe	Deputy Prime Minister	22 March 2018	21 March 2020	1 year, 365 days
Elisabetta Casellati		Italy	Europe	President of the Senate	24 March 2018	12 October 2022	4 years, 202 days
Inés María Chapman Waugh		Cuba	North America	Vice President	19 April 2018	10 October 2019	1 year, 174 days
Beatriz Johnson Urrutia		Cuba	North America	Vice President	19 April 2018	10 October 2019	1 year, 174 days
Altinai Omurbekova		Kyrgyzstan	Asia	Deputy Prime Minister	20 April 2018	15 June 2020	2 years, 56 days
Dima Moussa		Syrian Arab Republic (opposition)	Asia	Vice President of the National Coalition	6 May 2018	1 July 2020	2 years, 56 days
Dima Moussa		Syrian Arab Republic (opposition)	Asia	Vice President of the National Coalition	12 September 2023	12 February 2025	1 year, 153 days
Epsy Campbell Barr		Costa Rica	North America	First Vice President	8 May 2018	8 May 2022	4 years, 0 days
Alicia Pucheta		Paraguay	South America	Vice President	9 May 2018	15 August 2018	98 days
Tatyana Golikova		Russia	Europe	Deputy Prime Minister	18 May 2018	Incumbent	8 years, 159 days
Wan Azizah Wan Ismail		Malaysia	Asia	Deputy Prime Minister	21 May 2018	24 February 2020	1 year, 279 days
Carmen Calvo Poyato		Spain	Europe	First Deputy Prime Minister	7 June 2018	12 July 2021	3 years, 35 days
Delcy Rodríguez		Venezuela	South America	Vice President	14 June 2018	Incumbent	8 years, 132 days
Maya Tskitishvili		Georgia	Europe	Second Deputy Prime Minister	17 July 2018	22 February 2021	2 years, 220 days
Marta Lucía Ramírez		Colombia	South America	Vice President	7 August 2018	7 August 2022	4 years, 0 days
Alenka Bratušek		Slovenia	Europe	Deputy Prime Minister	13 September 2018	13 March 2020	1 year, 182 days
Olga Sánchez Cordero		Mexico	North America	Secretary of the Interior	1 December 2018	26 August 2021	2 years, 268 days
Isatou Touray		The Gambia	Africa	Vice President	15 March 2019	4 May 2022	3 years, 50 days
Alena Schillerová		Czech Republic	Europe	Deputy Prime Minister	30 April 2019	17 December 2021	2 years, 231 days
Alena Schillerová		Czech Republic	Europe	Deputy Prime Minister	15 December 2025	Incumbent	313 days
Katri Kulmuni		Finland	Europe	Deputy Prime Minister	12 September 2019	9 June 2020	271 days
Thea Tsulukiani		Georgia	Europe	First Deputy Prime Minister	13 September 2019	22 February 2021	1 year, 162 days
Thea Tsulukiani		Georgia	Europe	Deputy Prime Minister	31 March 2021	25 September 2024	3 years, 178 days
Raluca Turcan		Romania	Europe	Deputy Prime Minister	4 November 2019	23 December 2020	1 year, 49 days
Leela Devi Dookhun		Mauritius	Africa	Vice Prime Minister	12 November 2019	22 November 2024	5 years, 10 days
Chrystia Freeland		Canada	North America	Deputy Prime Minister	20 November 2019	16 December 2024	5 years, 26 days
Cristina Fernández de Kirchner		Argentina	South America	Vice President	10 December 2019	10 December 2023	4 years, 0 days
Nadia Calviño		Spain	Europe	Third Deputy Prime Minister	13 January 2020	31 March 2021	1 year, 77 days
Nadia Calviño		Spain	Europe	Second Deputy Prime Minister	31 March 2021	12 July 2021	103 days
Nadia Calviño		Spain	Europe	First Deputy Prime Minister	12 July 2021	29 December 2023	2 years, 170 days
Teresa Ribera		Spain	Europe	Fourth Deputy Prime Minister	13 January 2020	12 July 2021	1 year, 180 days
Teresa Ribera		Spain	Europe	Third Deputy Prime Minister	12 July 2021	25 November 2024	3 years, 136 days
Viktoria Abramchenko		Russia	Europe	Deputy Prime Minister	21 January 2020	14 May 2024	4 years, 114 days
Zeina Akar		Lebanon	Asia	Deputy Prime Minister	21 January 2020	10 September 2021	1 year, 232 days
Rebecca Nyandeng De Mabior		South Sudan	Africa	Fourth Vice President	21 February 2020	Incumbent	6 years, 245 days
Beatriz Argimón		Uruguay	South America	Vice President	1 March 2020	1 March 2025	5 years, 0 days
Aleksandra Pivec		Slovenia	Europe	Deputy Prime Minister	13 March 2020	5 October 2020	206 days
Veronika Remišová		Slovakia	Europe	Deputy Prime Minister	21 March 2020	15 May 2023	3 years, 55 days
Jadwiga Emilewicz		Poland	Europe	Deputy Prime Minister	9 April 2020	6 October 2020	180 days
Armanda Berta dos Santos		East Timor	Asia	Deputy Prime Minister	29 May 2020	1 July 2023	3 years, 33 days
Albulena Balaj-Halimaj		Kosovo	Europe	Deputy Prime Minister	3 June 2020	22 March 2021	292 days
Olha Stefanishyna		Ukraine	Europe	Deputy Prime Minister	4 June 2020	17 July 2025	5 years, 43 days
María Alejandra Muñoz		Ecuador	South America	Vice President	22 July 2020	24 May 2021	306 days
Raquel Peña de Antuña		Dominican Republic	North America	Vice President	16 August 2020	Incumbent	6 years, 69 days
Annika Saarikko		Finland	Europe	Deputy Prime Minister	10 September 2020	20 June 2023	2 years, 283 days
Petra De Sutter		Belgium	Europe	Deputy Prime Minister	1 October 2020	3 February 2025	4 years, 125 days
Sophie Wilmès		Belgium	Europe	Deputy Prime Minister	1 October 2020	14 July 2022	1 year, 286 days
Maja Gojković		Serbia	Europe	Deputy Prime Minister	28 October 2020	2 May 2024	3 years, 187 days
Olga Cebotari		Moldova	Europe	Deputy Prime Minister	9 November 2020	6 August 2021	270 days
Violeta Bermúdez		Peru	South America	Prime Minister	18 November 2020	28 July 2021	252 days
Kamala Harris		United States	North America	Vice President	20 January 2021	20 January 2025	4 years, 0 days
Uduch Sengebau Senior		Palau	Oceania	Vice President	21 January 2021	16 January 2025	3 years, 361 days
Pany Yathotou		Laos	Asia	Vice President	22 March 2021	23 March 2026	5 years, 1 day
Donika Gërvalla-Schwarz		Kosovo	Europe	Second Deputy Prime Minister	22 March 2021	Incumbent	5 years, 216 days
Emilija Redžepi		Kosovo	Europe	Third Deputy Prime Minister	22 March 2021	26 August 2025	4 years, 157 days
Sabine Monauni		Liechtenstein	Europe	Deputy Prime Minister	25 March 2021	Incumbent	5 years, 213 days
Yolanda Díaz		Spain	Europe	Third Deputy Prime Minister	31 March 2021	12 July 2021	103 days
Yolanda Díaz		Spain	Europe	Second Deputy Prime Minister	12 July 2021	Incumbent	5 years, 104 days
Võ Thị Ánh Xuân		Vietnam	Asia	Vice President	6 April 2021	Incumbent	5 years, 201 days
Mariam Chabi Talata		Benin	Africa	Vice President	24 May 2021	Incumbent	5 years, 153 days
Jessica Alupo		Uganda	Africa	Vice President	21 June 2021	Incumbent	5 years, 125 days
Robinah Nabbanja		Uganda	Africa	Prime Minister	21 June 2021	Incumbent	5 years, 125 days
Dina Boluarte		Peru	South America	First Vice President	28 July 2021	7 December 2022	1 year, 132 days
Mutale Nalumango		Zambia	Africa	Vice President	24 August 2021	Incumbent	5 years, 61 days
Ensieh Khazali		Iran	Asia	Vice President	1 September 2021	10 August 2024	2 years, 344 days
Mirtha Vásquez		Peru	South America	Prime Minister	6 October 2021	31 January 2022	117 days
Yulia Svyrydenko		Ukraine	Europe	First Vice Prime Minister	4 November 2021	17 July 2025	3 years, 255 days
Kalina Konstantinova		Bulgaria	Europe	Deputy Prime Minister	13 December 2021	2 August 2022	232 days
Korneliya Ninova		Bulgaria	Europe	Deputy Prime Minister	13 December 2021	2 August 2022	232 days
Paulette Lenert		Luxembourg	Europe	First Deputy Prime Minister	5 January 2022	17 November 2023	1 year, 104 days
Sigrid Kaag		Netherlands	Europe	First Deputy Prime Minister	10 January 2022	8 January 2024	1 year, 363 days
Santia Bradshaw		Barbados	North America	Deputy Prime Minister	26 January 2022	Incumbent	4 years, 271 days
Doris Gutiérrez		Honduras	North America	Second Vice President	27 January 2022	30 April 2024	2 years, 94 days
Doris Gutiérrez		Honduras	North America	First Vice President	30 April 2024	27 January 2026	1 year, 272 days
Izkia Siches		Chile	South America	Minister of the Interior and Public Security	11 March 2022	6 September 2022	179 days
Mariana Vieira da Silva		Portugal	Europe	Minister of the Presidency	30 March 2022	2 April 2024	2 years, 3 days
Anja Šimpraga		Croatia	Europe	Deputy Prime Minister	29 April 2022	17 May 2024	2 years, 18 days
Mary Munive		Costa Rica	North America	Second Vice President	8 May 2022	31 July 2025	3 years, 84 days
Mary Munive		Costa Rica	North America	First Vice President	31 July 2025	8 May 2026	281 days
Tanja Fajon		Slovenia	Europe	Deputy Prime Minister	1 June 2022	4 June 2026	4 years, 3 days
Sara Duterte		Philippines	Asia	Vice President	30 June 2022	Incumbent	4 years, 116 days
Belinda Balluku		Albania	Europe	Deputy Prime Minister	28 July 2022	26 February 2026	3 years, 213 days
Francia Márquez		Colombia	South America	Vice President	7 August 2022	7 August 2026	4 years, 0 days
Carolina Tohá		Chile	South America	Minister of the Interior and Public Security	6 September 2022	4 March 2025	2 years, 179 days
Thérèse Coffey		United Kingdom	Europe	Deputy Prime Minister	6 September 2022	25 October 2022	49 days
Esperança da Costa		Angola	Africa	Vice President	15 September 2022	Incumbent	4 years, 39 days
Ebba Busch		Sweden	Europe	Deputy Prime Minister	18 October 2022	Incumbent	4 years, 6 days
Betssy Chávez		Peru	South America	Prime Minister	26 November 2022	7 December 2022	11 days
Rose Christiane Raponda		Gabon	Africa	Vice President	9 January 2023	30 August 2023	233 days
Carmel Sepuloni		New Zealand	Oceania	Deputy Prime Minister	25 January 2023	27 November 2023	306 days
Manuela Roka Botey		Equatorial Guinea	Africa	Prime Minister	1 February 2023	17 August 2024	1 year, 198 days
Mariya Gabriel		Bulgaria	Europe	Deputy Prime Minister	6 June 2023	9 April 2024	308 days
Luisa María Alcalde Luján		Mexico	North America	Secretary of the Interior	19 June 2023	30 September 2024	1 year, 103 days
Riikka Purra		Finland	Europe	Deputy Prime Minister	20 June 2023	Incumbent	3 years, 126 days
Karien van Gennip		Netherlands	Europe	Second Deputy Prime Minister	5 September 2023	2 July 2024	301 days
Denisa Saková		Slovakia	Europe	Deputy Prime Minister	25 October 2023	Incumbent	2 years, 364 days
Manuela Schwesig		Germany	Europe	President of the Bundesrat	1 November 2023	31 October 2024	365 days
María Jesús Montero		Spain	Europe	Fourth Deputy Prime Minister	21 November 2023	29 December 2023	38 days
María Jesús Montero		Spain	Europe	First Deputy Prime Minister	29 December 2023	27 March 2026	2 years, 88 days
Verónica Abad Rojas		Ecuador	South America	Vice President	25 November 2023	24 May 2025	1 year, 180 days
Victoria Villarruel		Argentina	South America	Vice President	10 December 2023	Incumbent	2 years, 318 days
Karin Herrera		Guatemala	North America	Vice President	15 January 2024	Incumbent	2 years, 282 days
Netumbo Nandi-Ndaitwah		Namibia	Africa	Vice President	4 February 2024	21 March 2025	1 year, 45 days
Cristina Gherasimov		Moldova	Europe	Deputy Prime Minister	5 February 2024	Incumbent	2 years, 261 days
Lyudmila Petkova		Bulgaria	Europe	Deputy Prime Minister	9 April 2024	16 January 2025	282 days
Irena Vujović		Serbia	Europe	Deputy Prime Minister	2 May 2024	16 April 2025	349 days
Hsiao Bi-khim		Taiwan (Republic of China)	Asia	Vice President	20 May 2024	Incumbent	2 years, 157 days
Cheng Li-chun		Taiwan (Republic of China)	Asia	Vice Premier	20 May 2024	Incumbent	2 years, 157 days
Fleur Agema		Netherlands	Europe	First Deputy Prime Minister	2 July 2024	3 June 2025	336 days
Sophie Hermans		Netherlands	Europe	Second Deputy Prime Minister	2 July 2024	3 June 2025	336 days
Sophie Hermans		Netherlands	Europe	First Deputy Prime Minister	3 June 2025	23 February 2026	265 days
Mona Keijzer		Netherlands	Europe	Fourth Deputy Prime Minister	2 July 2024	3 June 2025	336 days
Mona Keijzer		Netherlands	Europe	Third Deputy Prime Minister	3 June 2025	23 February 2026	265 days
Angela Rayner		United Kingdom	Europe	Deputy Prime Minister	5 July 2024	5 September 2025	1 year, 62 days
Zahra Behrouz Azar		Iran	Asia	Vice President	10 August 2024	Incumbent	2 years, 75 days
Shina Ansari		Iran	Asia	Vice President	22 August 2024	Incumbent	2 years, 63 days
Harini Amarasuriya		Sri Lanka	Asia	Prime Minister	24 September 2024	Incumbent	2 years, 30 days
Rosa Icela Rodríguez		Mexico	North America	Secretary of the Interior	1 October 2024	Incumbent	2 years, 23 days
Anke Rehlinger		Germany	Europe	President of the Bundesrat	1 November 2024	31 October 2025	364 days
Sariha Moya		Ecuador	South America	Acting Vice President	11 November 2024	23 December 2024	42 days
Verona Murphy		Ireland	Europe	Ceann Comhairle	18 December 2024	Incumbent	1 year, 310 days
Sara Aagesen		Spain	Europe	Third Deputy Prime Minister	25 November 2024	Incumbent	1 year, 333 days
Jane Naana Opoku-Agyemang		Ghana	Africa	Vice President	7 January 2025	Incumbent	1 year, 290 days
Maria Benvinda Levy		Mozambique	Africa	Prime Minister	15 January 2025	Incumbent	1 year, 282 days
Josephine Joseph Lagu		South Sudan	Africa	Fifth Vice President	10 February 2025	Incumbent	1 year, 256 days
Carolina Cosse		Uruguay	South America	Vice President	1 March 2025	Incumbent	1 year, 237 days
Doina Nistor		Moldova	Europe	Deputy Prime Minister	14 March 2025	1 November 2025	232 days
Lucia Witbooi		Namibia	Africa	Vice President	21 March 2025	Incumbent	1 year, 217 days
Cynthia Gellibert		Ecuador	South America	Acting Vice President	30 March 2025	24 May 2025	55 days
Adrijana Mesarović		Serbia	Europe	Deputy Prime Minister	16 April 2025	Incumbent	1 year, 191 days
María José Pinto		Ecuador	South America	Vice President	24 May 2025	Incumbent	1 year, 153 days
Jane Ansah		Malawi	Africa	Vice President	4 October 2025	Incumbent	1 year, 20 days
Oana Gheorghiu		Romania	Europe	Deputy Prime Minister	30 October 2025	20 October 2026	355 days
María Antonieta Mejía		Honduras	North America	First Vice President	27 January 2026	Incumbent	270 days
Diana Herrera		Honduras	North America	Third Vice President	27 January 2026	Incumbent	270 days
Maria Nedina		Bulgaria	Europe	Deputy Prime Minister	19 February 2026	8 May 2026	78 days
Dilan Yeşilgöz		Netherlands	Europe	First Deputy Prime Minister	23 February 2026	Incumbent	243 days
Denisse Miralles		Peru	South America	Prime Minister	24 February 2026	17 March 2026	21 days
Albana Koçiu		Albania	Europe	Deputy Prime Minister	26 February 2026	Incumbent	240 days
Viengthong Siphandone		Laos	Asia	Vice President	23 March 2026	Incumbent	215 days
Suphajee Suthumpun		Thailand	Asia	Deputy Prime Minister	30 March 2026	Incumbent	208 days
Nan Ni Ni Aye		Myanmar	Asia	Second Vice President	10 April 2026	Incumbent	197 days
Anita Orbán		Hungary	Europe	Deputy Prime Minister	16 May 2026	Incumbent	161 days
Han Seong-sook		South Korea	Asia	Prime Minister	1 July 2026	Incumbent	115 days
Louise Haigh		United Kingdom	Europe	First Secretary of State	20 July 2026	Incumbent	96 days
Irina Okladnikova		Russia	Europe	Deputy Prime Minister – Chief of Staff of the Government	22 October 2026	Incumbent	2 days

== See also ==
- Council of Women World Leaders
- List of current state leaders by date of assumption of office
- List of elected and appointed female state leaders
- Women in government
