= Gacek (surname) =

Gacek is a Polish surname. Notable people with the surname include:

- Elżbieta Gacek (born 1938), Polish politician
- Piotr Gacek (born 1978), Polish volleyball player
- Urszula Gacek (born 1963), Polish politician
- Wally Gacek (1926–2020), Canadian ice hockey player
