= Majalli Wahabi =

Druze-Israeli politician

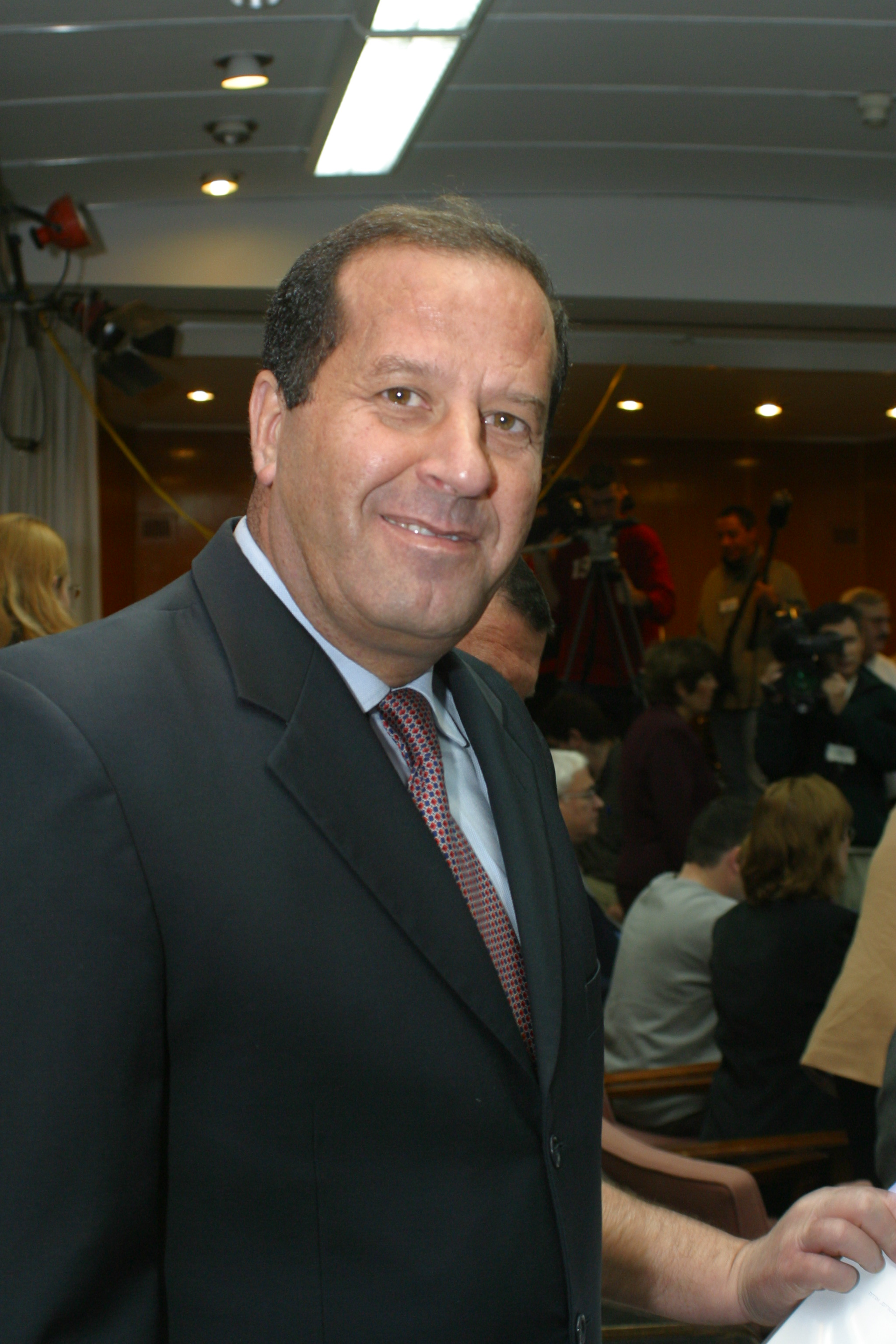

Faction represented in the Knesset
- 2003–2005: Likud
- 2005–2012: Kadima
- 2012–2013: Hatnuah

Personal details
- Born: 12 February 1954 (age 72) Beit Jann, Israel

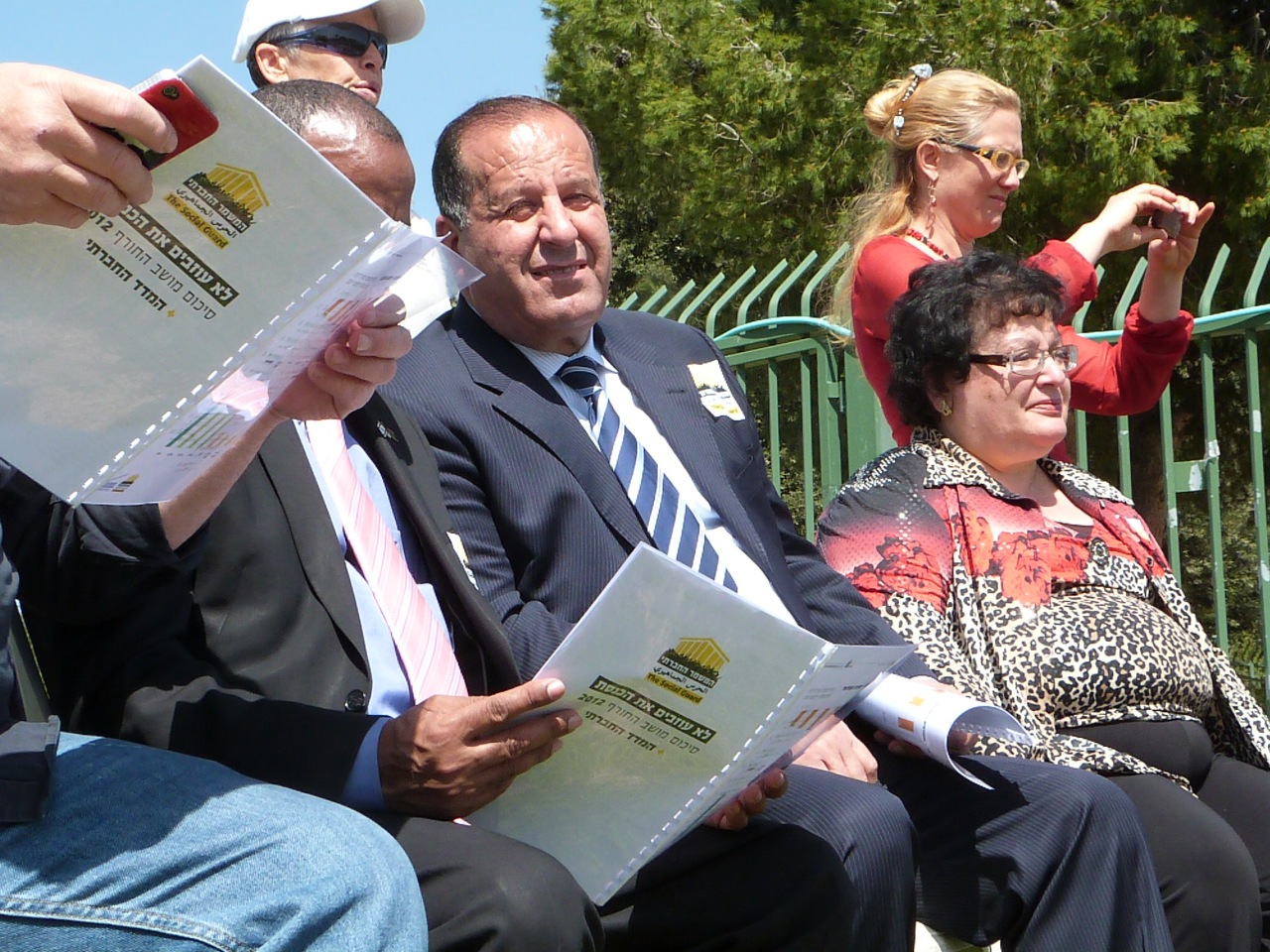
Wahaba in 2012

Majalli Wahabi (Arabic: مجلي وهبي, Hebrew: מג'לי והבה, also transcripted as Majalli Wahbee or Majli Wahaba; born 12 February 1954) is a Druze-Israeli politician who served as a member of the Knesset for Likud, Kadima and HaTnuah between 2003 and 2013. He briefly assumed the position of Acting President due to the President of Israel Mr. Moshe Katsav's leave of absence as well as due to Interim and Acting President of Israel Mrs. Dalia Itzik's diplomatic trips abroad that took place during 2007; making him the first non-jew and the first Druze to be Israel's acting head of state; although assuming it for a mere few short periods during that year.

== Early and personal life ==
Wahabi was born in the Druze village of Beit Jann, Israel. He earned a B.A. in Political Sciences and History of Islam at the Hebrew University of Jerusalem; and M.A. in History of Concurrent Middle East at the University of Haifa, Israel. He is fluent in Arabic, Hebrew, English, and French.

He served in the Israel Defense Forces (IDF). Initially assigned as an instructor at the intelligence school, he joined a designated Druze infantry battalion and became an officer. He served in the 1982 Lebanon War, and subsequently as a deputy brigade commander in the Golan Heights Division, and as a senior Northern Command officer. He rose to the rank of Lieutenant-Colonel.

Wahabi is married and has 4 children; among them is his son Tomer Wahaba who served as the first Druze member of the Israeli Army Radio (Galatz).

== Political career ==
Wahabi met then-Defense Minister Ariel Sharon in 1981. Starting in 1996, he served as Sharon's personal ambassador to Israel's Arab neighbors, Egypt and Jordan.

He was elected to the 16th Knesset in 2003 on the Likud list. In March 2005 he was appointed Deputy Minister in the Ministry in the Prime Minister's Office, and became Deputy Minister of Education, Culture and Sport in June 2006.

When Sharon left Likud to found Kadima, Wahabi followed, and was elected to the 17th Knesset in 2006 on the Kadima list. He assumed the position of Deputy Speaker of the Knesset. In October 2007 he was added to Ehud Olmert's cabinet as Deputy Foreign Affairs Minister. He retained his seat in the 2009 elections after being placed 21st on the Kadima list.

His public activities include:

- Director General, the Ministry for Regional Cooperation (1999–2002)
- Senior Political Advisor, Ministry of Foreign Affairs (1998–1999)
- Aide to the Minister of Infrastructure (1996–1999) (Ariel Sharon)

On 27 February 2007, while then president Moshe Katzav was on leave of absence due to an indictment for rape charges, and interim president Dalia Itzik was on a trip abroad, Wahabi, who had previously served as interim speaker of the Knesset, was named acting president of Israel for two weeks, becoming the first non-Jew and Druze to be Israel's acting head of state.

Wahabi condemned a website that "incited against Israeli soldiers" as war criminals and published their personal information and called for the punishment of those responsible.

Shortly before the 2013 elections Wahabi joined the new Hatnuah party, and was placed twelfth on its list. He lost his seat as the party won only six seats.

== See also ==
- List of Arab members of the Knesset
- List of Israeli Druze
