= Alicja Musiałowa-Afanasjew =

Polish politician (1911–1998)

Alicja Musiałowa-Afanasjew (1911–1998) was a Soviet-Polish politician (Communist).

She was a member of the Polish Council of State, making her a member of the Collective Head of State, in 1952–1965.
