= Rimma Gavrilova =

Rimma Gavrilova (1934-2008) was a Soviet-Russian Politician (Communist).

She was a member of the Presidium of the Supreme Soviet, making her a member of the Collective Head of State, in 1974-1984.
