= Mira Jangaracheva =

Kyrgyzstani politician (born 1952)

- Жангарачева Мира Камилевна

Deputy Prime Minister for Social Policy of the Government of the Kyrgyz Republic
- In office 1998–1999

Personal details
- Born: March 30, 1952 (age 74) Frunze, Kyrgyz SSR, USSR

Mira Jangaracheva (sometimes Dzhangaracheva) (born 1952) is a Kyrgyzstani politician.

Born in Frunze, Jangaracheva graduated from the history department of Kyrgyz National University in 1974. She worked at the Frunze Polytechnic Institute until 1978; from then until 1981, she studied at the Moscow State University. In 1981, she returned to the Frunze Polytechnic Institute to become a senior lecturer; from 1989 until 1992, she was at Moscow State University again, working on her doctoral degree. In 1992, she became the director of the Center for Social and Political Problems, launching her political career; soon, she became a deputy head of Bishkek's civic administration, handling social issues. In 1995, she was elected to the Supreme Council, and the following year, she was appointed deputy prime minister for social matters. By the end of the decade, she had become one of the most influential female politicians in the country. Jangaracheva remained as Minister of Labor and Social Affairs until 1999, when she was fired and made deputy governor of the Chuy Region. She has remained active in politics and government, more recently being named an advisor to the vice-prime minister. She has published many articles and papers on social matters and interethnic relations in her home country, and has spoken at TEDx functions in Kyrgyzstan.
