= Krystyna Marszałek-Młyńczyk =

Polish activist (1930–2007)

Krystyna Teresa Marszałek-Młyńczyk (born April 9, 1930 in Białystok, died December 22, 2007 in Warsaw) was a Polish press journalist, translator and editor, social activist. She was a member of the Democratic Party (SD), satellite of the Polish United Workers' Party (communist)

She was a member of the Polish Council of State, making her a member of the Collective Head of State, in 1980–1983.

She was Deputy Minister of Culture and Art (1986–1990), Director of the Polish Institute in Paris (1984–1986), President of the Council of the Foundation for the Remembrance of the Victims of the Auschwitz-Birkenau Extermination Camp (1990–2007).
