= Yekaterina Mukhina =

Yekaterina Mukhina (1944-1996) was a Soviet-Russian Politician (Communist).

She was a member of the Presidium of the Supreme Soviet, making her a member of the Collective Head of State, in 1979-1984.
