= Angèle Gnonsoa =

Ivorian academic and politician

Angèle Gnonsoa Zonsahon
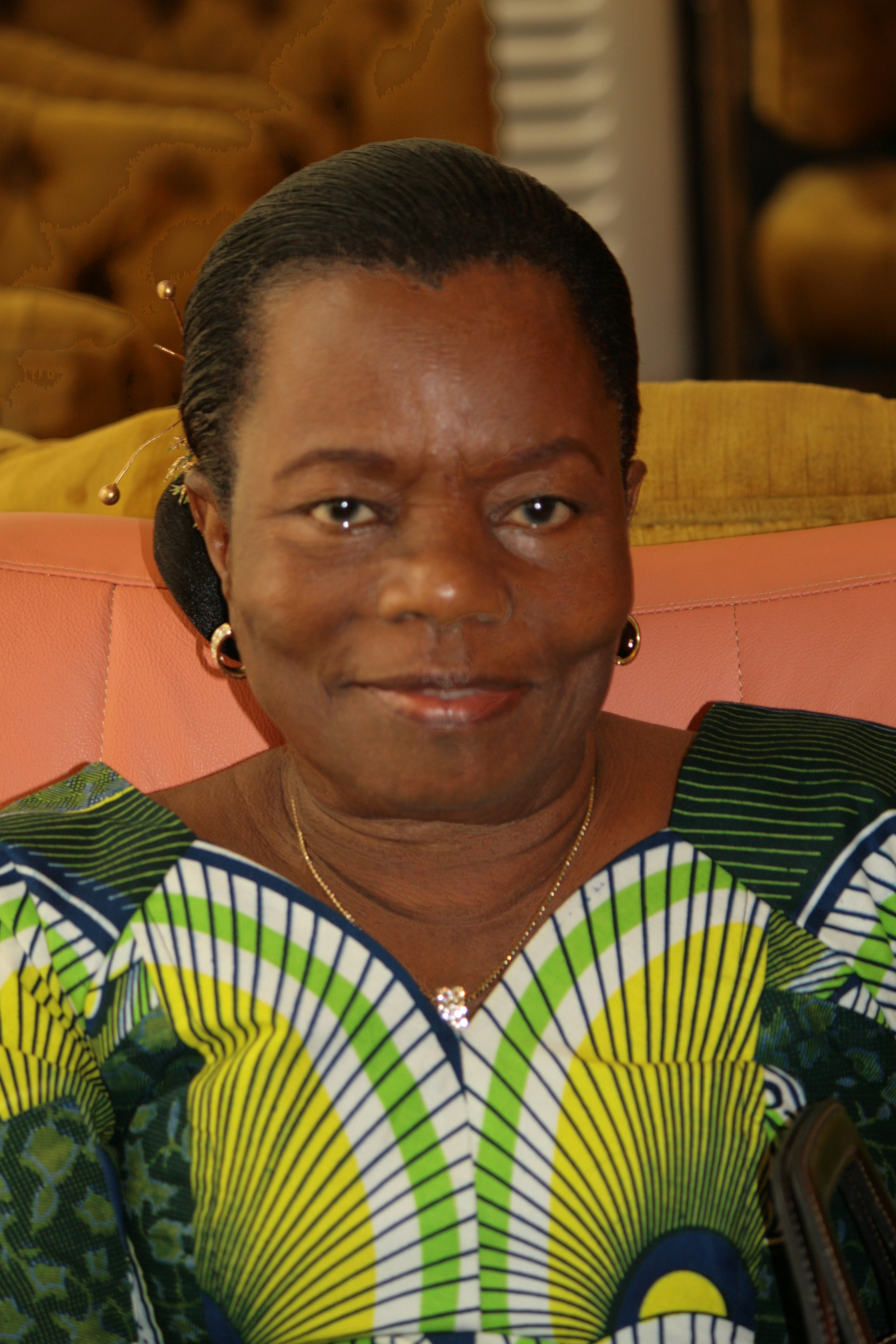
- Ivorian politician Angèle Gnonsoa

Personal details
- Born: 1941 (age 84–85)
- Citizenship: Ivory Coast
- Occupation: Politician, Minister

Angèle Gnonsoa or Angèle Gnonsoa Zonsahon (born 1941) is an Ivorian academic and politician. She was a Minister of the Environment from 2003 to 2005, and Minister of Professional Education during the 2010–2011 Ivorian crisis.

== Biography ==
Angèle Gnonsoa trained as an anthropologist, studying in France. A speaker of the Wè language, Gnonsoa researched and taught oral traditions at the University of Abidjan. She is an expert on the use of masks in Wè festivity.

As a university professor, Gnonsoa worked with Francis Wodié, trying to ensure multiparty politics in the Ivory Coast. She was a founding member of the Ivorian Workers' Party (PIT) in 1990. She was the party's second national secretary and later its first vice president. From 2003 to 2005 she served as Minister of the Environment, representing PIT in Seydou Diarra's government of national unity after the First Ivorian Civil War.

After the first round of the 2010 Ivorian presidential election in October 2010, the Ivorian Workers' Party was split over which of the two front-runners to support. Gnonsoa strongly opposed Wodié, who wanted to support the centre-right coalition of Alassane Ouattara. Instead she chose to support Laurent Gbagbo and, after the disputed election, entered Gbagbo's government under Gilbert N'Gbo Ake as minister of professional education. After Gbagbo's arrest in April 2011, Gnonsoa was also arrested. Though she escaped jail, she needed to leave the Ivory Coast, living as a refugee in Ghana for eight years until her 2019 return to the Ivory Coast.

== Works ==
- (with Philippe Oberlé) Masques vivants de Côte d'Ivoire. Colmar, France: S.A.E.P., 1985.
- Le masque au cœur de la société wè. Abidjan: Frat Mat éditions, 2007.
