= Eugenia Kempara =

Polish politician (1928–2024)

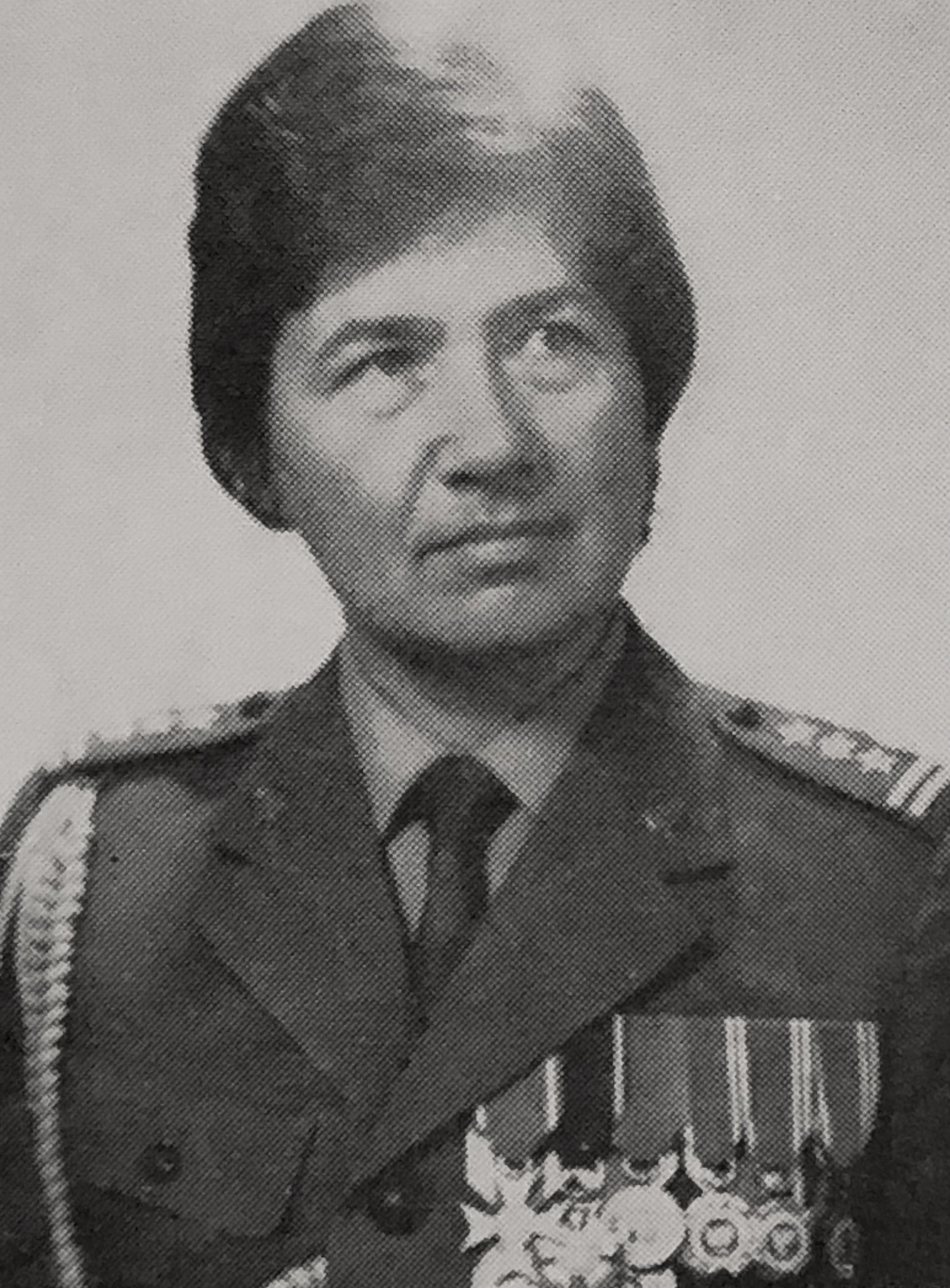
Eugenia Kempara

Eugenia Kempara (29 September 1928 – 20 December 2024) was a Polish communist politician.

== Life and career ==
Kempara was born on 29 September 1928. She was a member of the Polish Council of State, making her a member of the Collective Head of State, in 1976–1985.

Kempara died on 20 December 2024, at the age of 96.
