= Noura al-Ameer =

Syrian anti-government activist

Noura al-Ameer al-Jizawi is a Syrian anti-government activist and vice-president of the Syrian opposition. When she was 26, she was jailed for six months imprisoned in Damascus and Homs, released late in 2012.

== Biography ==
In 2016, she and her husband, Bahr Abdul Razzak, were living in Gaziantep, Turkey. She received a suspicious email, and Razzak, a security expert, found evidence she had been hacked by the Iranian government.

She was able to study at the University of Toronto for a masters at the Munk School of Global Affairs through a Scholars-at-Risk scholarship.
