= Halina Koźniewska =

Former Soviet-Polish politician

Halina Koźniewska (1920-1999) was a Soviet-Polish Politician (Communist).

She was a member of the Polish Council of State, making her a member of the Collective Head of State, in 1972-1980.
