= Eugenia Krassowska-Jodłowska =

Polish politician (1910–1986)

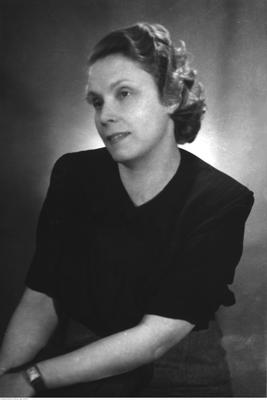
Eugenia Krassowska-Jodłowska

Eugenia Krassowska-Jodłowska (1910-1986) was a Soviet-Polish Politician (Communist).

She was a member of the Polish Council of State, making her a member of the Collective Head of State, in 1965-1972.
