= Interim and Acting President of Israel =

Temporary government posts provided in Israel's Basic Law

Interim President of the Israel and Acting President of Israel are temporary posts established by Israeli Basic Law for the State of Israel. These are two different offices, the Interim President in case of presidential vacancy, and Acting President when the President remains in office but temporarily cannot fulfill his or her duties.

== Interim President ==
The Basic Law states that in case of the death, resignation or removal from office of the President, the Speaker of the Knesset shall become Interim President:

If the place of the President of the State has fallen vacant, and so long as the new President has not yet begun to hold office, the Speaker of the Knesset shall hold office as Interim President of the State

An Interim President, who retains his post of Knesset Speaker, serves until the Knesset chooses a new President.

The following individuals have served as Interim President:

1. Yosef Sprinzak (November 9 – December 8, 1953)
2. Kadish Luz (April 23 – May 21, 1963)
3. Avraham Burg (July 13 – August 1, 2000)
4. Dalia Itzik (July 1 – July 15, 2007)

== Acting President ==
During a period in which the President of the State has temporarily ceased to carry out his functions and exercise his powers, the Speaker of the Knesset shall hold office as Acting President of the State

Disregarding cases in which the President is outside Israel (and is legally deemed to "cease to carry out his functions and exercise his powers"), the most recent person to serve as Acting President was Dalia Itzik, when Moshe Katzav was suspended. However, when including those cases, the speaker of the knesset receives the role every time the president goes abroad.

Majalli Wahabi, briefly became Israel's Acting President due to Moshe Katzav's leave of absence and Dalia Itzik's trip abroad in February 2007, making him the first non-Jew (Druze) to act as Israel's head of state.
