= Elżbieta Gacek =

Polish communist politician (born 1938)

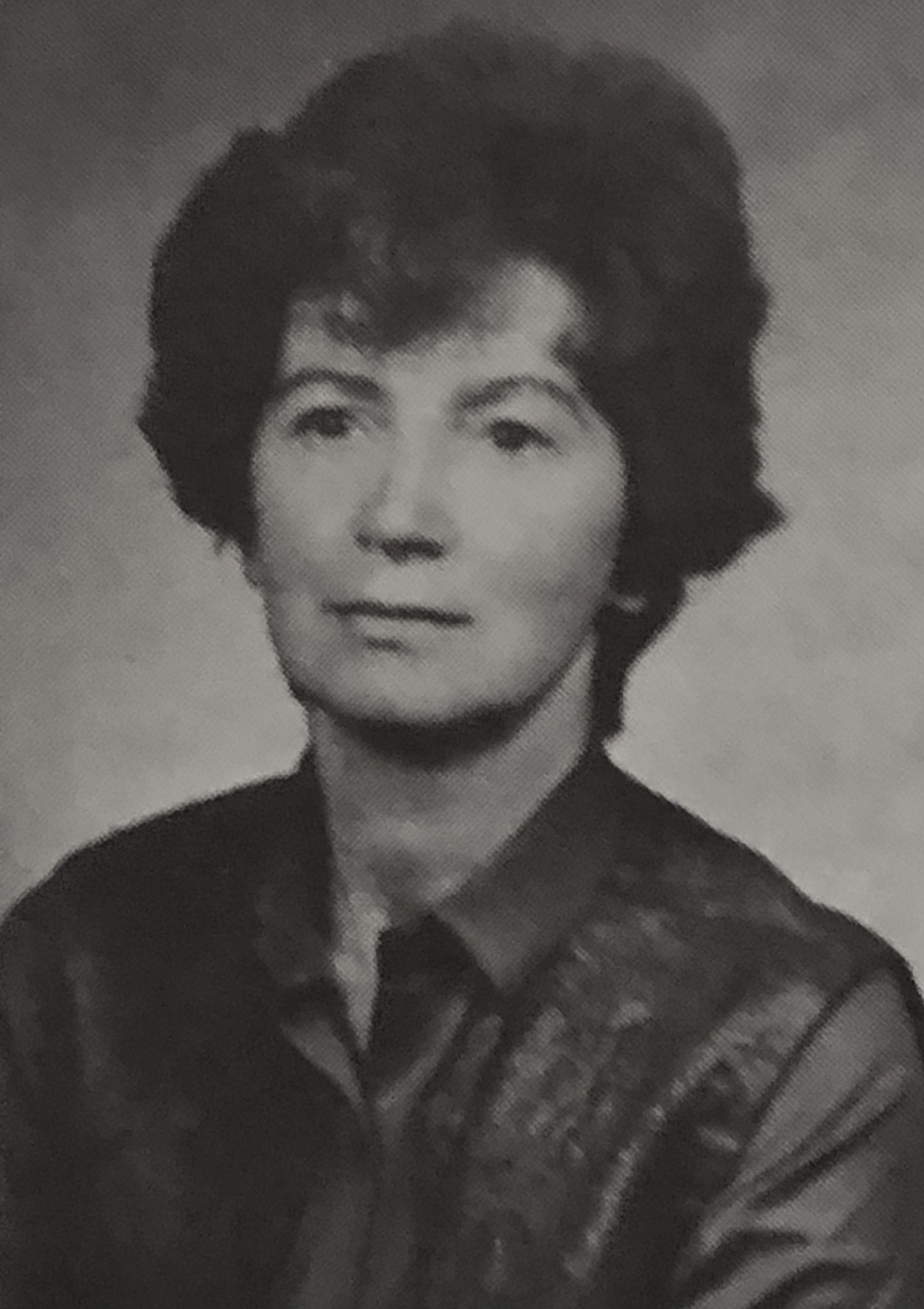
Elżbieta Gacek

Elżbieta Gacek (born 1938) was a Polish communist politician. She was a member of the Polish Council of State, making her a member of the Collective Head of State, from 1985 to 1988.
