= Dalia Itzik =

Israeli politician (born 1952)

- דליה איציק
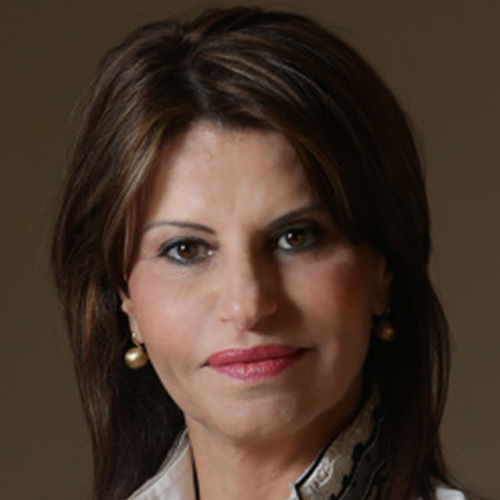
- Itzik in 2014

Acting President of Israel
- In office 1 July 2007 – 15 July 2007
- Prime Minister: Ehud Olmert
- Preceded by: Moshe Katsav
- Succeeded by: Shimon Peres

Speaker of the Knesset
- In office 4 May 2006 – 30 March 2009
- Preceded by: Reuven Rivlin
- Succeeded by: Reuven Rivlin

Leader of the Opposition
- In office 13 May 2003 – 25 June 2003
- Prime Minister: Ariel Sharon
- Preceded by: Amram Mitzna
- Succeeded by: Shimon Peres

Ministerial roles
- 1999–2001: Minister of the Environment
- 2001–2002: Minister of Industry and Trade
- 2005: Minister of Communications

Faction represented in the Knesset
- 1992–1999: Labor Party
- 1999–2001: One Israel
- 2001–2006: Labor Party
- 2006–2013: Kadima

Personal details
- Born: 20 October 1952 (age 73) Jerusalem

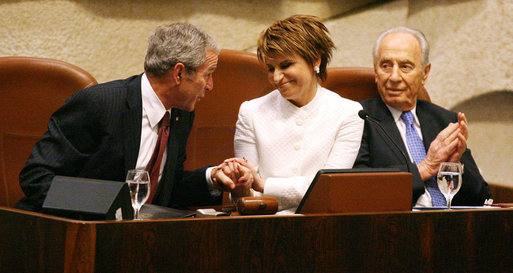
Dalia Itzik with U.S. President George W. Bush and Shimon Peres

Dalia Itzik (Hebrew: דליה איציק Dalya Itsik; born 20 October 1952) is an Israeli former politician who last served as a member of the Knesset for Kadima. She has previously served in several ministerial positions, and on 4 May 2006 became the first female speaker of the Knesset, and served as President of Israel in an interim capacity in July 2007. She was briefly the first woman in Israel's history to be president.

== Biography ==
Itzik was born in Jerusalem. Her parents were Iraqi Jews who had immigrated to Israel. Her family was poor; her father was an alcoholic and at times her mother had to steal food for the family to survive. She attended a religious high school, and afterwards, avoided conscription to the Israel Defense Forces by declaring herself religious. She then attended a teacher training course, and went on to obtain a BA in Literature and History from the Hebrew University of Jerusalem and a BA in law from IDC Herzliya. She worked as a teacher, during which she headed the teachers' union in Jerusalem, worked as a deputy to Jerusalem mayor Teddy Kollek, and served as a member of the executive committee of the Israel Broadcasting Authority.

On 26 October 1988, she was involved in a car accident that killed Knesset member Michael Reisser, who was driving to Jerusalem, when Reisser's car crashed into hers. Reisser was fatally wounded and died the following day, while Itzik was seriously injured.

She is married to Danny, an employee of the Israel Electric Corporation. They have three children, Ran, Uri and Adi. The family lives in Jerusalem's Ramat Sharett neighborhood.

== Political career ==
Before being elected to the 13th Knesset in 1992, Itzik served as the deputy mayor of Jerusalem.

After being re-elected in 1996 and 1999, she was appointed Minister of the Environment in Ehud Barak's government, serving from 1999 until 2001. In 2001 she became Minister of Industry and Trade, before leaving the cabinet in 2002.

Re-elected in 2003, Itzik served as Minister of Communications in 2005. In 2006 she defected to Ariel Sharon's newly formed party, Kadima.

Following the 2006 elections she became Knesset speaker. On 25 January 2007, Israeli President Moshe Katsav took a three-month leave of absence, and on 1 July of that year, resigned the office in a plea bargain. The speaker of the Knesset stands first in the line of succession, making Itzik acting president. She served as the official head of State until Shimon Peres formally took over on 15 July 2007.

After winning third place on the party's list, Itzik retained her seat in the 2009 elections and later became the chairperson of the party. On 5 December 2012, in the days leading up to the 2013 elections while polls showed Kadima either barely getting into the Knesset or not even passing the threshold, Itzik announced she was taking a break from politics and dropping out of the race.

Itzik contested in the 2014 Israeli presidential election, coming third with 28 votes. Her supporters came from across the political spectrum.
