= List of political parties in Ecuador =

This article lists political parties in Ecuador.

Ecuador has a multi-party system with numerous parties, in which usually no single party has a chance of gaining power alone, so parties must work with each other to form coalition governments.

== Registered parties ==
Party/Movement		Nº	Est.	Political position	Ideology	Leader	Assembly members	Provincial Prefects	Mayors
Democratic Center Movement; Movimiento Centro Democrático	CD	1	2012	Centre	Big tent; Social liberalism	Galo Almeida	0 / 151	0 / 23	17 / 221
Popular Unity Movement; Movimiento Unidad Popular	UP	2	2014	Left-wing	Revolutionary socialism; Primordialism	Geovanni Atarihuana	1 / 151	1 / 23	13 / 221
Patriotic Society Party; Partido Sociedad Patriótica	PSP	3	2002	Right-wing	Populism; Personalism	Lucio Gutiérrez	1 / 151	0 / 23	9 / 221
People, Equality and Democracy Movement; Movimiento Pueblo, Igualdad y Democracia	PID	4	2022	Centre	Big tent; Pluralism	Arturo Moreno	0 / 151	0 / 23	5 / 221
Citizen Revolution Movement; Movimiento Revolución Ciudadana	RC	5	2016	Left-wing	Social democracy; Post-neoliberalism	Rafael Correa	65 / 151	8 / 23	50 / 221
Social Christian Party; Partido Social Cristiano	PSC	6	1951	Right-wing	Neoliberalism; Christian democracy	Jaime Nebot	4 / 151	2 / 23	73 / 221
National Democratic Action; Acción Democrática Nacional	ADN	7	2021	Right-wing	Neoliberalism; Personalism	Daniel Noboa	66 / 151	1 / 23	1 / 221
Advance; Avanza	Avanza	8	2012	Right-wing	Neoliberalism; Big tent	Javier Orti	0 / 151	0 / 23	15 / 221
Democratic Left; Izquierda Democrática	ID	12	1970	Centre-left	Social liberalism; Social democracy	Analía Ledesma	0 / 151	1 / 23	10 / 221
AMIGO Movement; Movimiento AMIGO	AMIGO	16	2020	Centre	Big tent; Pluralism	Juan Carlos Yar	0 / 151	0 / 23	2 / 221
Ecuadorian Socialist Party; Partido Socialista Ecuatoriano	PSE	17	1926	Centre-left	Social democracy; Pluralism	Gustavo Vallejo	0 / 151	0 / 23	7 / 221
Pachakutik Plurinational Unity Movement; Movimiento de Unidad Plurinacional Pachakutik	MUPP	18	1995	Centre-left to left-wing	Indigenism; Primordialism	Leonidas Iza	9 / 151	6 / 23	26 / 221
Future Movement; Movimiento Futuro	MF	20	2018	Centre-right	Big tent; Political opportunism	Gustavo Larrea	0 / 151	0 / 23	7 / 221
CREO Movement; Movimiento CREO	CREO	21	2012	Right-wing	Neoliberalism; Right-wing populism	Guillermo Lasso	0 / 151	0 / 23	20 / 221
SUMA Party; Partido SUMA	SUMA	23	2012	Right-wing	Neoliberalism; Political opportunism	Mauricio Rodas	0 / 151	1 / 23	25 / 221
RETO Movement; Movimiento RETO	RETO	33	2012	Centre-right	Big tent; Political opportunism	Aquiles Alvarez	1 / 151	0 / 23	12 / 221

== Unregistered parties ==
Party / Movement		Est.	Political position	Ideology	Leader	National affiliation	International affiliation
Communist Party of Ecuador; Partido Comunista del Ecuador	PCE	1926	Far-left	Marxism–Leninism	Winston Alarcón Elizalde	FE (2014-2018)	IMCWP; WAIP; FSP
Communist Party of Ecuador – Red Sun; Partido Comunista de Ecuador – Sol Rojo	PCE-SR	1993	Far-left	Marxism–Leninism–Maoism; Gonzalo Thought; Anti-revisionism	Comrade Joselo		ICL
Marxist–Leninist Communist Party of Ecuador; Partido Comunista Marxista–Leninista del Ecuador	PCMLE	1964	Far-left	Marxism–Leninism; Stalinism; Hoxhaism; Anti-revisionism	Oswaldo Palacios	MPD (1978–2014); UP (since 2014)	ICMLPO
Workers' Party of Ecuador; Partido de los Trabajadores del Ecuador	PTE	1996	Far-left	Marxism–Leninism			
Ecuadorian Communist Party; Partido Comunista Ecuatoriano	PCE	2012	Far-left	Marxism–Leninism; Bolivarianism	Paúl Almeida	FE (2014-2018)	FSP

== Defunct parties ==
- Alfarist Radical Front (FRA)
- A New Option (UNO)
- Build Movement (MC25)
- Christian Democratic Union (Ecuador) (DP)
- Concentration of People's Forces (CFP)
- Conservative Party (Ecuador) (PCE)
- Democratic People's Movement (MPD)
- Ecuadorian Popular Revolutionary Union
- Ecuadorian Radical Liberal Party (PLRE)
- Ecuadorian Roldosist Party (PRE)
- Freedom Party (Ecuador) (PL)
- Institutional Renewal Party of National Action (PRIAN)
- Movement Ecuador's Force (MFE)
- PAIS Alliance
- Solidarity Fatherland Movement (MPS)
- Ethics and Democracy Network (RED)
- Velasquist National Federation (FNV)
- Force Ecuador (FE)
- Coalition Movement (MC)

== See also ==
- List of political parties by country
- Liberalism and radicalism in Ecuador
