= Ricardo Patiño =

Ecuadorian politician

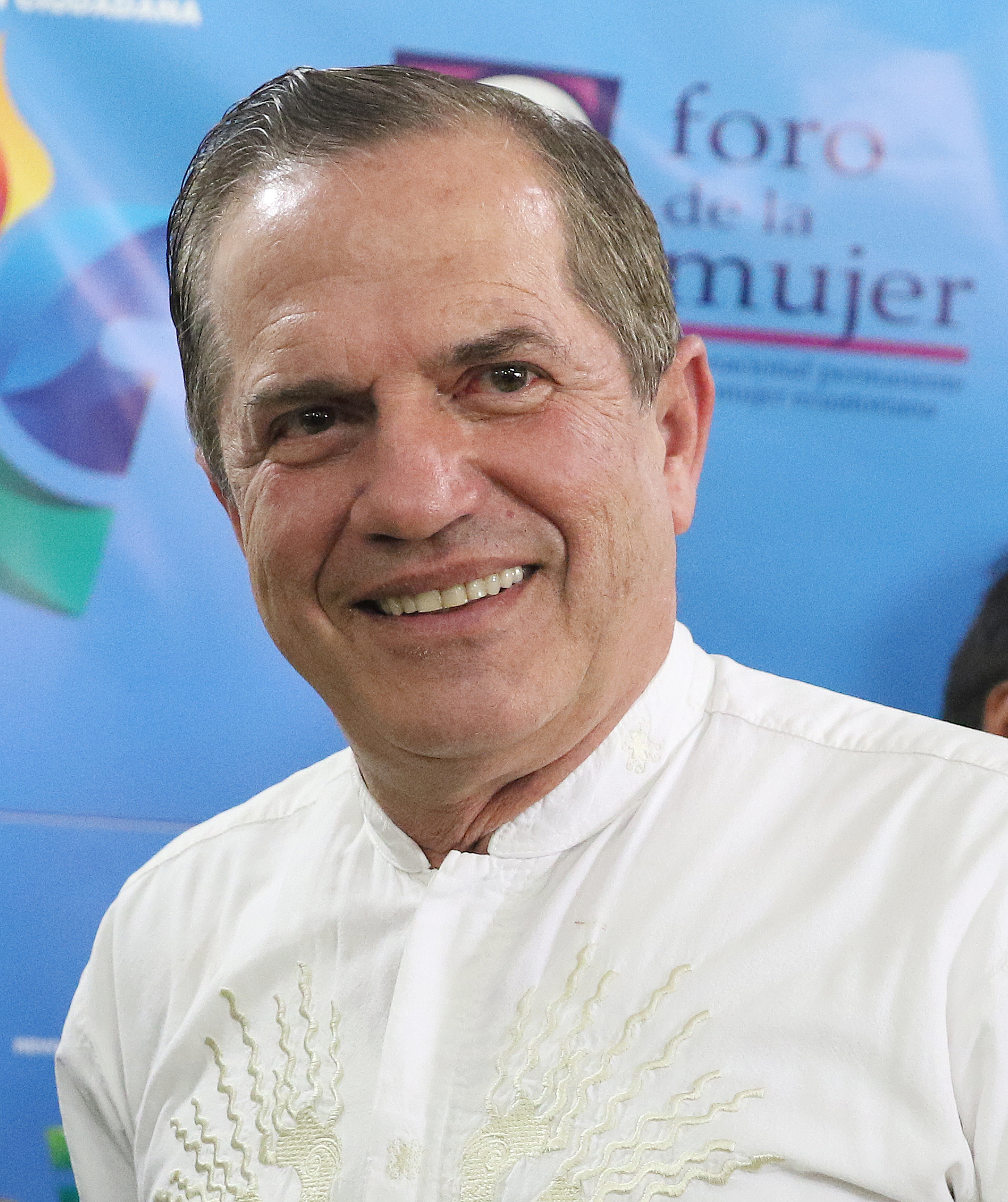

Minister of National Defence
- In office 4 March 2016 – 24 May 2017
- President: Rafael Correa
- Preceded by: Fernando Cordero Cueva

Minister of Foreign Affairs
- In office January 2010 – March 2016
- President: Rafael Correa
- Preceded by: Fander Falconí
- Succeeded by: Guillaume Long

Personal details
- Born: 16 May 1954 (age 72) Guayaquil, Ecuador
- Education: Metropolitan Autonomous University; International University of Andalusia

Ricardo Armando Patiño Aroca (born 16 May 1954) is an Ecuadorian politician who served as minister of foreign affairs from 2010 to 2016, under the government of President Rafael Correa. Previously he was minister of finance and minister of the coast. He is one of the ideologists of The Citizens' Revolution, which, with Correa, wanted to gradually introduce a democratic socialist government in Ecuador. On 4 March 2016, he was named as defense minister by President Correa.

== Academic career ==
Born in Guayaquil, Patiño studied economics at the Metropolitan Autonomous University (UAM) in Iztapalapa, Mexico. He earned the diploma to "Best Economics Student from Autonomous Metropolitan University", and he graduated as top student, due to his high grade point average (1979). He then received a Master in Economic Development at the International University of Andalusia, Spain (2001).

He has published the following books: "Desempleo y Subempleo en Guayaquil en la Década de los 90: Teoría, Conceptos, Indicadores y Tendencia" (Unemployment and Underemployment in Guayaquil during the 90s: Theory, Concepts, Indicators, and Trends) and "Jubileo 2000", "La vida antes que la Deuda" (Jubilee 2000: Life before debt). He is co-author of the book: "Empleo y economía del Trabajo en el Ecuador"(Employment and Labor Economics in Ecuador), published by Abya-yala (2001). Additionally, he wrote the introduction for the book: "Deuda Externa y Bonos Brady" (External Debt and Brady Bonds).

Besides, he collaborated as Technical Editor for the collection of books that make up the "Plan Nacional de Empleo del Ecuador" (National Plan of Employment) that addresses topics such as: "Plan Nacional de Empleo y Desarrollo Local" (National Plan of Employment and Local Development), "Las Microfinanzas en el Ecuador"(Microfinance in Ecuador), "Inversión Pública y Uso Intensivo de Mano de Obra- Políticas y Metodología de Medición"(Public Investment and Intensive Labor Use – Policies, Methods of Measurement), "Empleo y Género" (Employment and Gender), "Jornadas de Intercambio de Experiencias de Proyectos de Empleo y Desarrollo Local" (Experience Sharing Conference Project on Employment and Local Development), "Censo Nacional de Cooperativas de Ahorro y Crédito controladas por la Dirección Nacional de Cooperativas"(National Census of Saving and Credit Unions controlled by the National Directorate of Cooperatives).

After writing his master's thesis related to the world of labor, Patiño was External Consultant of the ILO (September 2000 – February 2001) and General Coordinator of the Research Team "Estrategias para una política de empleo para el Ecuador con énfasis en la pequeña empresa y micro empresa" (Strategies for an employment policy for Ecuador with emphasis on micro and small enterprise) ILDIS (February – September 2000). From March 2001 to December 2002, he was Coordinator of the Technical Advisory Committee of the Inter-Ministerial Committee on Employment of Ecuador.

Throughout his career he has held the positions such as : Economic Consultant of the Ecuadorian Central Class Organizations (1982–1991), Parliamentary Counselor (1990–1992), Founding Member of the Board of Directors of the Association of Users and Consumers of Guayas (1992 – 1997), Founder of the Group of Social Studies (March 1999 – 2000), General Coordinator of the Research Team "Strategies for an employment policy for Ecuador with emphasis on micro and small enterprise" ILDIS (February – September 2000), Founding Member and Coordinator of the Jubilee 2000 movement-Red Guayaquil Driving Group member (May 1999 to present), Member of the Driving Group (May 1999 – to present), Coordinator of the Technical Advisory Committee of the Inter-Ministerial Employment Commission of Ecuador (March 2001 – December 2002), Founding Member and Manager of the Savings and Credit Cooperative "De todas" (February 2003 – May 2005), Coordinator of the Professional Team appointed by Jubilee 2000 – Red Guayaquil, for developing the National Strategy for Debt Relief (August to December 2003), Advisor to the Minister of Economy and Finance of the Republic of Ecuador (June to July 2005), General Undersecretary of Economics at the Ministry of Economy and Finance of the Republic of Ecuador (July–August 2005), Minister of Economy and Finance (January–July 2007), President of the Comprehensive Auditing Commission of Ecuador's Public Credit (2007–2008), Minister of the Coast (July–December 2007), Politics' Minister Coordinator (2008 – 2010), and Minister of Foreign Affairs, Trade, and Integration (2010 to present).

== Political career ==
After graduation from UAM, Patiño went to Nicaragua where he took part in the Sandinista Revolution, which overthrew the Somoza family dictatorship. This socialist revolution was influenced by liberation theology. He was then appointed Head of the Department of Economic Planning, National Institute of Agrarian Reform, Southern Region, Nicaragua (1980–1981), where he worked on land redistribution which was a major priority of the Nicaraguan government.

Patiño then returned to Guayaquil to work as an activist with trade unions and workers in the country. He was Economic Adviser for the Ecuadorian Central Class Organizations (1982–1991) and Founding Member of the Board of the Association of Users and Consumers of Guayas (1992 – 1997). He was also an advisor at the National Parliament (1990–1992).

In 1999 Patiño was a founding member, along with Alberto Acosta, Patricia Davila and Yvonne Benitez and others, of Jubilee 2000 – Guayaquil Network, an organization that investigated, criticised, and sought to resolve issues concerning Ecuador's foreign debt. Patiño was the Coordinator of this movement for two years, and remains a member of the promoter group.

In 2002, influenced by reading "Creating a world without poverty" by Professor Muhammad Yunus, Patiño gathered together a group of professionals and leaders of social organizations providing financial support and training for women with very low income without access to credit in the financial system (especially from the Guasmo of Guayaquil). This organization, which works with the Grameen Methodology, still works today and has expanded considerably.

== Performance in the public service in Ecuador ==
Patiño was part of the team that accompanied Correa since the beginning of his political career. He participated in two of his political campaigns: in 2006, (when he first won the Presidency of the Republic for the first time), and in 2009 (when he was elected for his second term of office within the framework of the general elections contemplated under the transition regime introduced with the endorsement of the Magna Carta). The leftist leader led the Ministries of Economy and Finance (nowadays Ministry of Finance), Coast, Coordinator of Politics and Autonomous Governments. He currently is the Minister of Foreign Affairs, Trade and Integration.

=== Minister of Economy and Finance ===
While he was Minister of Economy, Patiño created the Under-Secretariat of Social Economy, and raised the need of carrying out a Comprehensive Auditing to the Ecuadorian public debt. This initiative materialized in 2008. Besides, he increased the budget for health and education, created policies for granting credits to rural areas, and gave priority to investment in social and strategic sectors.

Additionally, the first actions done to design and construct a New International Financial Architecture, fundamental importance issue to the Government of Ecuador that led to the creation of a specialized Presidential Technical Commission for the design of new regional financial institutions, with special emphasis in the design and creation of the "Banco del Sur" (South Bank) as the regional development banks to support new type called the food sovereignty, health, natural resources and knowledge. Also the implementation of a system of payments in local currencies to stimulate and deepen regional trade subsequently managed to make in the Regional Clearance Unitary System (SUCRE).

His initial actions for the creation of the "Banco del Sur" were included in the Declaration of Quito from 3 May 2007 and in the Declaration of Asuncion, 22 May 2007. These efforts converged on the signing of the Founding Act of "Banco del Sur" by the Presidents of Argentina, Bolivia, Brazil, Ecuador, Paraguay, Uruguay and Venezuela, on 9 December 2007.

=== Relations with IMF and World Bank ===
Before the government took office, Ricardo Patiño, as designated Minister of Economy, stated to the International Monetary Fund (IMF) that the country would not sign Letters of Intent with the IMF ever again. (By signing these kinds of documents, Ecuador assumed commitments on economic policies in return for continuing to receive IMF loans). He also announced that the country would pay in advance the total of its debt with the Fund, which added up to $33 million. In that way it would end its credit relations with that organization.

Four months after Correa's government took office, Ecuador settled its debt with IMF and declared Eduardo Somensatto, the representative of the World Bank (WB) in the country as "persona non grata", as a refusal towards the Bank's decision of not signing the second part of the credit for competitive adjustment and consolidated tax, for an amount of one hundred million dollars, because of an alleged unfulfilment of the conditions concerning public debt, established under the conditions matrix.

The World Bank decided not to sign such loan, at the time in which President Rafael Correa was Minister of Economy and Finance, despite the fact that, previously, the Loans Committee had issued a favorable report where it is stated that all the established conditions at the policies matrix and the Board of Directors, were met.

=== Renegotiation of external debt ===
Voicing a speech, that included constant references such as the need of "putting humans before capital at all times", from the Ministry of Economy and Finance (now Ministry of Finance), Patiño drove, since January 2007, the creation of a commission that would audit the total public debt of the country, including the contracting, negotiation, restructuration, and usage of the different types of credits in order to determine their legitimacy, transparence, quality, efficiency, and effectiveness.

The main objective was achieved on 9 July 2007, by means of the issuing of the decree 427 on the part of President Correa. The document, that gave way to an unprecedented process of public debt auditing on behalf of State organisms, stipulated the creation of the Comprehensive Auditing Commission of Ecuador's Public Credit (officially known as CAIC, which is its acronym in Spanish). This Commission audited the "covenants, contracts, and other forms of modalities used in credit acquisition by Ecuador's' public sector that came from governments, institutions of the multilateral financing system or the bank and the private sector, whether national or foreign, from 1976 to 2006".

Patiño, President of the CAIC, structured work that comprehended the technical, financial, social viability that served as a basis for justifying each credit. It also considered the conditions under which they were granted, the conditioning set by the creditor, the destination of the resources, the general impact of the project, among other issues.

The final report of the CIAC was presented in November 2008; among its arguments were the declaration of "illegitimacy" to the commercial tranches and the need of recognizing the joint responsibly comprehended in managing the debt, the annulment of illegitimate obligations and the compensation for the damages caused. President, Rafael Correa, declared on 12 December the moratorium of the external debt, on the tranche of Global bonds 2012 and 2030. Global bonds 2010 represented a capital of 510 million dollars. In February 2009, he likewise declared the moratorium on Global bonds 2030; they added up to a capital of 2,700 million dollars. With this declaration, Correa undertook the definition of a proposal directed to creditors, despite the warnings from the market analysts that the country would suffer the terrible consequences of having refused to pay the debt when it had all the necessary resources in order to do so. The market speculated on the scope of Ecuador's plan. Options revolved around the renegotiation, restructuration, repurchase, exchange of documents, among others. The official proposal was presented on 20 April 2009; it consisted on repurchasing the bonds in circulation for up to 35 cents of their nominal values (price ceiling), appealing to an inverse reverse auction mechanism, by which the owed amount reduced just as the due date for closing the operation got closer. Ecuador finally announced, on June of the same year, that through the operation it had repurchased the bonds with a discount of up to 70 per cent. According to reports from the Minister of Finance of that time, Elsa Viteri, the net savings that came from this operation were 2,000 million dollars. However, when adding the savings concerning the service of the bonds, if their original settlement due date had arrived, the country saved 7,500 million dollars, according to Viteri. Ecuador, buy means of the repurchase and other actions concerning the management of its public debt, succeeded in lowering the service of its external obligations from almost the 40% to the 22% of the General Budget of the State. The balance of the debt reduced, in net terms, by more than 3,000 million and the service by 331.2 million dollars a year. With these achievements, during the last five years, social investment grew significantly from 1,980 to 5,197 million dollars between 2006 and 2011. Poverty, at national scale, decreased from 37.6% to 28.6%, during the same years. Rural poverty was reduced from 60.6 to 50.9 per cent. (Source: Video "Debtocracy").

=== Politics' Minister Coordinator ===
He was then appointed head of the Ministry of the Coast, an entity created for coordinating State organizations and their initiatives within the provinces of the littoral of Ecuador. During his administration, he set the basis for the prevention and assistance plans aimed to the areas that are regularly affected by climatic phenomena, such as "El Niño".

In this position, he strengthened the bonds with Decentralized Autonomous Governments (GAD, acronym in Spanish), and with indigenous organizations of the country regarding governmental policies in favor of interculturality in the Ecuadorian society. Besides, he coordinated the relations between the Executive and the ruling bloc at the Constituent National Assembly of Ecuador 2007, that wrote the Constitution which is in force, and whose establishment was approved by 81.72% of the voters at the Popular Referendum of 15 April of the same year. The Constituent Assembly had 130 members: 100 at province scale, 24 at national scale, and 6 representatives of the emigrant communities. Alianza Pais had 80 seats.

Also, along with the bloc of Alianza Pais, he participated in the approval of laws and the definition of constitutional reforms implemented by the Constituent Assembly on the areas of Fundamental Rights and Guarantees; Organization; Social and Citizen Participation; Structure and State Institutions; Land-use Regulation and Allocation of Responsibilities; Natural Resources and Biodiversity; Labor, Production, and Social Inclusion; Development Regime; Justice and Fight against Corruption; Sovereignty, International Relations and Integration; and Legislation and Inspection.

The Constitution was approved on 28 September 2008 by an overwhelming majority of voters (63.93%). After this resolution, a transition regime was established. It considered the execution of new general elections; here, Correa and the ruling movement, as well as the adoption of the required reforms for applying the new Magna Carta prevailed including the approval and implementation of the democratic institutions for the administration of justice, among others.

The transition period was completed on 10 August 2009, with the possession of President Rafael Correa and of the members of the National Assembly.

=== Minister of Foreign Affairs, Trade, and Integration ===
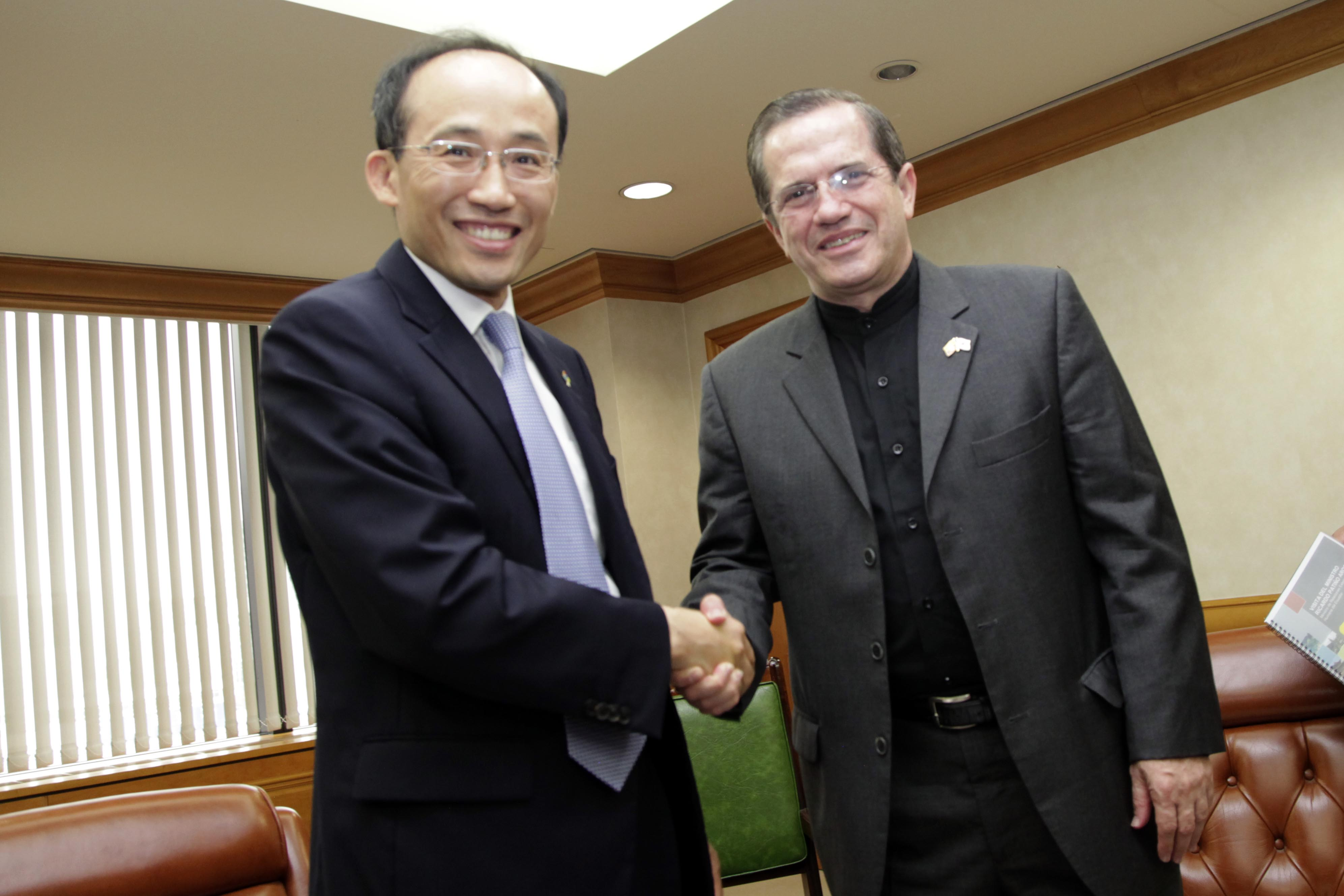
Ricardo Patiño (right) with the 1st Deputy Minister of Economy and Finance of South Korea Choo Kyung-ho (left) in 2013

In January 2010, he assumed the post of Minister of Foreign Affairs, Trade, and Integration; he voiced a speech on sovereignty, regional integration, making citizens participants of diplomacy, and supporting Ecuadorian migrants abroad. During his administration, Ecuador witnessed transcendental milestones regarding its international and trade policies, which included the consolidation of relations with neighboring countries, the end to border disputes, the achievement of new commercial partners, the strengthening of new stages of regional integration, and the promotion of human rights.

Ecuador also witnessed advances on bilateral relations with Colombia and Peru. During 2012, Binational Cabinets took place in both countries on which agreements on road management, health, security, trade, assistance to vulnerable populations were signed; also, the basis for a comprehensive governmental assistance in the border areas were set. With neighboring countries, the border disputes were settled after defining the sea limits by means of a process that involved dialogue, negotiation, and mutual trust.

Ecuador became a model when it comes to the integration process that boosted the development of regional blocks such as the Union of South American Nations (UNASUR, acronym in Spanish), the Community of Latin American and Caribbean States (CELAC, acronym in Spanish), and the Bolivarian Alliance for the Americas (ALBA, acronym in Spanish). Along these lines, he has been an important agent in the region regarding democracy defense and the sovereignty of nations.

When it comes to the economic area, his labor has focused on opening new markets and on the inclusion of new agent in foreign trade; for example; micro, small and medium-sized enterprises, as well as the agents for fair trade and popular and solidarity economy. As an alternative to Free Trade Agreements (FTA), he developed a new commercial agreement format called "Acuerdo Comercial para el Desarrollo (ACD acronym in Spanish)" (Trade Agreement for Development), a proposal that is going through negotiation with Turkey, El Salvador, and Nicaragua, and which has been introduced to countries such as the United States, Switzerland, Canada, among others.

In the framework of this integration process, new economic and trade relations are being promoted, by strengthening the usage of the Unified System for Regional Compensation (SUCRE, acronym in Spanish). Besides, specific policies for Asia, Africa, and Oceania were planned and executed; by doing so, the opening of new Embassies like the one from Singapore and Qatar, as well as commercial offices in Colombia, the U.S., Singapore, Argentina, and the Netherlands has taken place.

He has strengthened trade relations with nations including China, a country that has signed several agreements with Ecuador concerning electricity generation projects, mining, security, health, infrastructure and cooperation. Regarding the opening of markets, he has strengthened trade relations with countries from Asia, Africa, and the Middle East. However, the United States and the European Union remain a priority on his agenda.

==== The Boost of UNASUR ====
When Patiño took possession as Minister of Foreign Affairs, Trade, and Integration, Ecuador was the President Pro Tempore of UNASUR. At the time, 3 of the 12 countries had ratified the Treaty establishing the organism; therefore, Patiño's goal was to get the rest of the countries to ratify it in a short period so it would enter into force. As a result, he undertook an international campaign in order to achieve it.

Finally, the Treaty establishing UNASUR entered into force in March 2011, almost three years after it had been signed in Brasilia, on 23 May 2008.

At the same time, there was a strong impetus to form and consolidate the South American Councils on Health, Social Development, Infrastructure and Planning, World Drug Problem, Defense, and South American Energy. It is also important to acknowledge the adoption of the Additional Protocol to the UNASUR Constitutive Treaty of the "Commitment to Democracy", which recognizes the support to the democratic order in the region.

==== Momentum for a New International Financial Architecture ====
Consistent with the undertaken activities as Minister of Economy and Finance, Patiño as the Minister of Foreign Affairs and Human Mobility promoted the use, expansion and deepening of the Regional Clearance Unitary System (SUCRE) as a tool to increase and deepen trade relations with Cuba, Bolivia, Ecuador, Nicaragua and Venezuela. They are countries that form the ALBA-TCP.

He has been a promoter of the creation of "Banco del Sur" (Southern Bank).

Among his efforts to provide UNASUR the legal and institutional structure, he has promoted "Banco del Sur", whose managed deployed the necessary actions aimed at the signing of the Agreement by the Heads of the seven founding countries (Argentina, Brazil, Bolivia, Ecuador, Paraguay, Uruguay and Venezuela), held on 26 September 2009.

On 3 April 2012, with ratification by the parliaments of Argentina, Bolivia, Ecuador, Uruguay and Venezuela, entered into force the Charter and on 12 June 2013 held the first meeting of the Council of Ministers of Finance, the same which was opened by Ecuador's Foreign Minister Ricardo Patiño and the Chancellor of Venezuela Elias Jagua. At this first meeting there were important steps aimed at this regional development banks new type, based primarily on the strategic needs of the region and not subjugated to the dictates of the market, including operations in the shortest possible time. (the rules of procedure was approved, the process of designation of authorities was agreed and the schedule of the first contributions was approved).

==== 30 September ====
Minister Ricardo Patiño had protagonist participation when supporting President Rafael Correa during the events that took place on 30 September 2010. Along with the members of the Government Cabinet, he joined the people that went to Carondelet Palace in order to support the President. There, he condemned the coup d’état attempt and appealed people to pacifically march to the National Police Hospital so as to rescue the President, who had been kidnapped by the members of the Police.

Patiño led the way and remained at the place where the confrontation occurred, where after a fire exchange, a major military operation managed to rescue President Correa.

Diplomatic representative from several countries and international organisms met that day in Ecuador for supporting democracy and the Government of President Rafael Correa. The Presidents of UNASUR had a meeting the very same day in Argentina and approved a declaration that energetically condemns the coup d’état attempt; also, they instructed their Foreign Ministers to meet in Quito so as to give their support to the Ecuadorian Government. Next day, an Extraordinary Meeting of Foreign Ministers from UNASUR was held in order to express their support to President Correa.

OAS approved a resolution rejecting these facts and supporting the National Government. Next day, the Secretary General of the organism visited the country and expressed his support directly to the Government.

Likewise, before the UN, the Group of States of Latin America and the Caribbean approved a declaration rejecting all attempts made to destabilize democratic order in Ecuador, and appealed the international community to pronounce itself on defense of institutionalism and democratic stability in Ecuador and the region.

Afterwards, the Foreign Ministry, in charge of Patiño, made an international appeal to safeguard democracy in Ecuador; acts of solidarity took place in countries from all over the world, where people congregated in order to express their support to the Government of Rafael Correa.

==== Ecuador expels United States Ambassador ====
In April 2011, he expelled the United States Ambassadress in Ecuador, Heather Hodges, since she refused to give explanations concerning a cable filtered by WikiLeaks, in which Hodges affirmed that President Rafael Correa appointed General Jaime Hurtado as Commander of the National Police despite the fact that he knew about his alleged criminal behavior since he thought that because of Hurtado's condition he could be "easily manipulated". Patiño expressed his indignation resulting from those affirmations, declared the Ambassadress persona non grata, and asked her to leave the country as soon as possible. In response, the United States also expelled Ecuadorian Ambassador, Luis Gallegos.

Finally, the impasse was overcome by appointing new ambassadors in both countries in June 2012.

==== Incorporation of new diplomats ====
As part of his commitment to break down racist and discriminative schemes in the Foreign Ministry, Patiño incorporated people of indigenous nationalities, afro-Ecuadorians, and "montubios" to the diplomatic service for the first time. Two public meritocracy-based rounds took place to select approximately 170 career diplomats that also were compliant with the gender equity concept and with the participation of national minority groups, traditionally discriminated in Ecuador.

==== Diplomatic asylum to Julian Assange ====
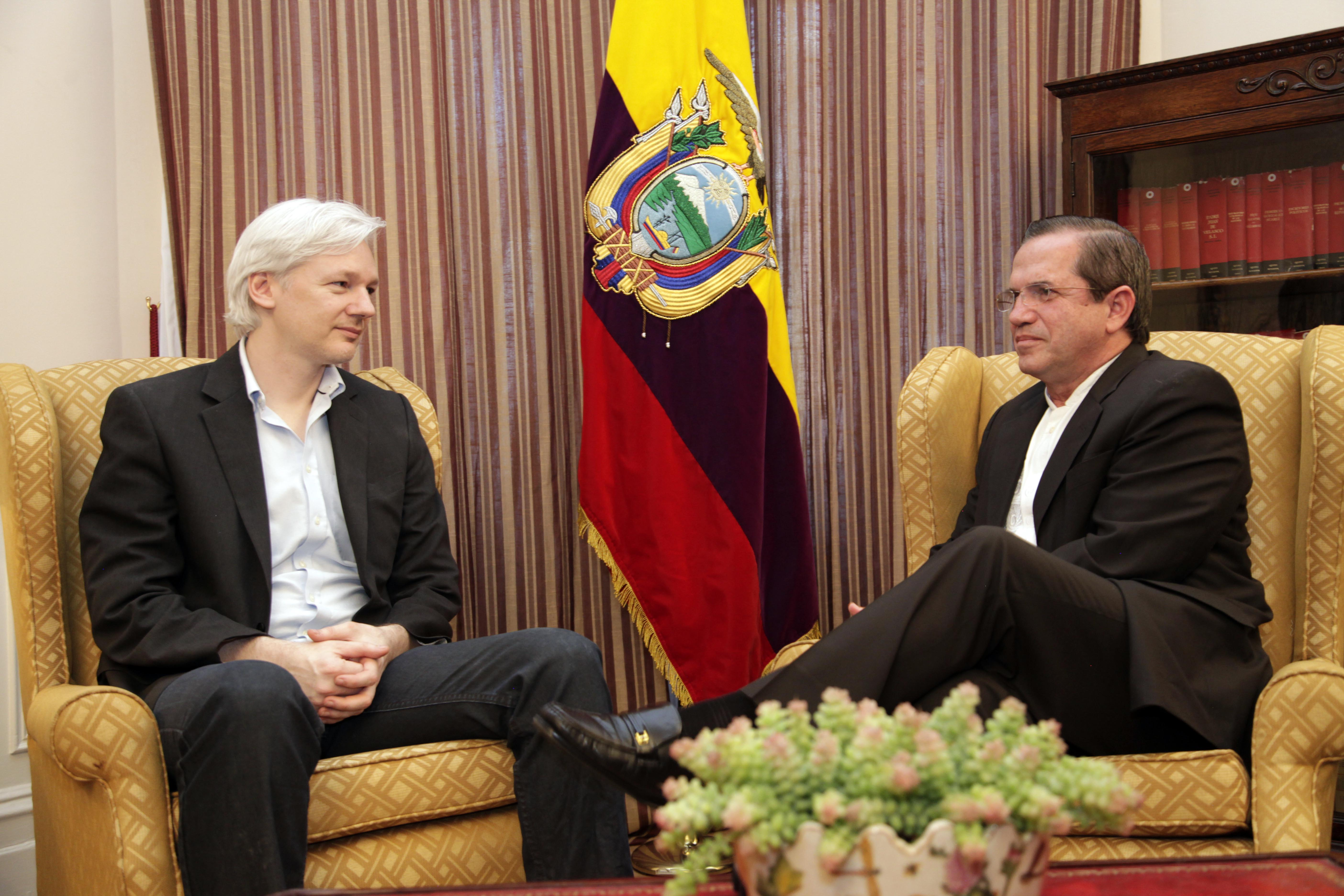
Ricardo Patiño with Assange at the Ecuadorian Embassy on 16 June 2013

On 19 June 2012, the creator of WikiLeaks, Julian Assange, appeared at the Ecuadorian Embassy in London in order to request diplomatic protection to the Ecuadorian State. He based his request on his fear that the United Kingdom would extradite him to Sweden, the country that wants to interrogate him on alleged sex crimes, and that from that country he could be further extradited to the United States, where he affirms his life is at risk.

From that moment on, Ecuador held diplomatic high-level dialogues with the United Kingdom, Sweden, and the United States.

The Ecuadorian Government asked the United Kingdom for guarantees so Assange could face, without obstacles, the open legal proceedings in Sweden. Among such guarantees were that once his legal responsibilities were faced in Sweden, he would not be further extradited to a third country; before which, no displays of wanting to achieve political commitments were received.

The lawyers of the Australian citizen requested to the Swedish justice that it take Assange's declarations at the premises of the Ecuadorian Embassy in London. Ecuador officially stated its will to ease up this interview so as not to interfere or obstruct the legal proceedings that were developing in Sweden, a measure that is legally feasible. Sweden did not accept it. On the other hand, Ecuador consulted the possibility that the Swedish government would establish guarantees so Assange would not be extradited from that country to the United States. Again, it received a negative answer.

Finally, Ecuador addressed a communication to the Government of the United States in order to officially get to know its position on the Assange case. Consultations revolved around enquiring if a legal proceeding against Julian Assange and/or the creators of WikiLeaks was taking place, or if there was any intention of doing so; what kind of laws, which conditions, and maximum penalties these people would be subjected to; and if there was any intention of requesting Julian Assange's extradition to the United States. Its response was that it could not provide information on the matter, alleging it was a bilateral issue between Ecuador and the United Kingdom.

Amid the dialogues, Ecuador was holding with the United Kingdom, Sweden, and the United States, on 15 August, Patiño condemned the British threat of taking action in order to arrest Julian Assange by entering the premises of the Ecuadorian Embassy in London. The next day, he announced that the Government of Ecuador had decided to grant diplomatic asylum to the creator of WikiLeaks.

The international community condemned the United Kingdom's threat and supported Ecuador's position regarding the grant of diplomatic asylum. Several organisms like the OAS, UNASUR, ALBA, and political and social organizations from several countries showed their support to Ecuador.

On 27 September 2012, Patiño had a meeting with the British Foreign Minister, William Hague. They agreed to carry on with the dialogues in order to find a diplomatic solution for the issue.

==== Promoter of a profound reform of the Inter American System on Human Rights (IASHR) ====
The Minister of Foreign Affairs, Trade and Integration, Ricardo Patiño has been one of the promoters of the initiative to strengthen the Inter- American Human Rights System, with specific reforms to the Inter- American Commission on Human Rights (IACHR). The representatives of 21 States Parties to the American Convention on Human Rights (Pact of San Jose) met in Guayaquil on 11 March 2013 for further discussion in the region.

During the plenary, member countries of the Pact of San Jose, agreed a resolution that served as a draft for the discussion at the Extraordinary General Assembly of the Organization of American States (OAS) held on 22 March in Washington, where a resolution was passed which hosted almost entirely the Declaration of Guayaquil.

For the same purpose, Patiño also chaired the Second Conference of States Parties to the American Convention on Human Rights on 14 May 2013, in Cochabamba, Bolivia, where a second Declaration was passed reaffirming commitments held in Guayaquil, and establishes concrete actions to advance the process in which Ecuador has played an active and decisive role.

Among the most important results is to create a Special Committee of Ministers of Foreign Affairs, to visits countries that are not part of the American Convention on Human Rights, as well as a proposal to establish a forum with all the States, Party and non-Party, members of the Pact of San José, and with the participation of social sectors to discuss the issue and advance in the objective of strengthening the IACHR.

== Arrest warrant ==
In April 2019 Ola Bini, a Swedish software developer, was detained in Ecuador. Ecuador said he was being investigated for being part of a plot to "destabilise" the Ecuadorian government. Ecuador's interior minister, María Paula Romo alleged Patiño was part of the plot and had travelled with Bini to Peru, Spain and Venezuela. Patiño said he had never met Bini. An Ecuadorian judge ordered Patiño's arrest for "instigation" and prosecutors asked Interpol for help in detaining him. Patiño said he was "being wrongfully pursued for calling for peaceful protests against President Lenín Moreno".

== See also ==
- Rafael Correa
- Debtocracy
- Socialism of the 21st century
- The Citizens' Revolution
