= Marllely Vásconez =

Ecuadorian politician

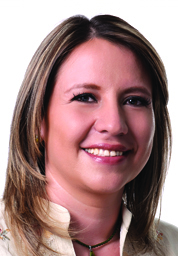
Marllely Vásconez in 2016

Marllely Vásconez Arteaga is a politician in Ecuador where she is the President of the commission on worker's rights and a member of the National Assembly.

== Life ==
Vásconez was born in the town of El Carmen in Manabí Province in Western Ecuador. She qualified in law and gained a doctorate. After lecturing for twelve years at the Lay University Eloy Alfaro, she stood to be a member of the assembly. She was the Director of the Provincial Directorate of the Ministry of Economic and Social Inclusion in Manabi.

She is a member of PAIS Alliance and the President of the commission on worker's rights. She was involved in debate over the government's measures to improve public-private partnerships and in improving workers rights when bullying takes place in the workplace.
