= São Paulo Forum =

Conference of left-wing political parties

- Foro de São Paulo (Portuguese); Foro de São Paulo (Spanish); Forum de São Paulo (French)
- Abbreviation: FSP
- Formation: 1990 (first conference)
- Type: Political international
- Purpose: South and Central American network of left-wing political parties and organisations
- Headquarters: São Paulo, Brazil
- Region served: The Americas
- Official languages: English, Portuguese, Spanish, and French

São Paulo Forum is a conference of left-wing political parties and organizations from the Americas, primarily Latin America and the Caribbean. It was launched by the Workers' Party (Portuguese: Partido dos Trabalhadores – PT) of Brazil in 1990 in the city of São Paulo.

The Forum of São Paulo was constituted in 1990, when the Brazilian Workers' Party approached other parties of Latin America and the Caribbean to debate the new international scenario after the fall of the Berlin Wall and rising adoption of some economic liberalization policies implemented at the time by right-leaning governments in the region. The stated main objective of the conference was to argue for alternatives to neoliberalism.

The first meeting held in São Paulo in July 1990 was attended by members of 48 parties and organizations from Latin American and the Caribbean. The original name given to the meeting was Meeting of Left and Anti-imperialist Parties and Organizations of Latin America (Portuguese: Encontro de Partidos e Organizações de Esquerda e Anti-imperialistas da América Latina). Since the 1991 meeting in Mexico City, it started being alternately called Foro de São Paulo in reference to the location of the first meeting. Subsequent meetings have been hosted by many of the parties throughout the region.

== Political stance ==
According to FSP, more than 100 parties and political organizations participate in its conferences today. Their political positions vary across a wide spectrum, which includes: social-democratic parties, left-wing grassroots labor and social movements inspired by the Catholic Church, ethnic and environmentalist groups, anti-imperialist and nationalist organizations, communist parties, and armed guerrilla forces. The latter, however, is true only so far as one is willing to think of the Revolutionary Armed Forces of Colombia as an actual member of the FSP, when actually the FARC, although never formally banned from the Forum, have been barred from participating in its meetings as early as 2005, when they were refused admittance to that year's meeting of the FSP in São Paulo.

These groups differ on a range of topics which go from the use of armed force in revolutions to the support of representative democracy. The Communist Party of Cuba, for example, has adopted a single-party system for decades, while Brazil's Workers' Party (PT) supports and participates in a multi-party system of representative democracy. Some parties such as Chile's Social Convergence advocate for radical democracy, participatory democracy, and workplace democracy instead of representative democracy as a primary value. These differences grant special relevance to FSP's final declarations, released at the end of each conference, which state the collective position of its members.

Ever since FSP's first meeting (1990), the Declaration which was approved expressed the participants' "willingness to renew leftist and socialist thought, to reaffirm its emancipating character, to correct mistaken conceptions, and to overcome all expressions of bureaucratism and all absence of true social and massive democracy."

The first Declaration manifests "an active compromise with the validity of human rights, of democracy and of popular sovereignty as strategic values, which place the constant challenge of leftist, socialist and progressive forces renewing their thoughts and actions."

At the second conference (Mexico, 1991), FSP expanded its objectives to add the proposal of working toward Latin American integration, an interchange of experiences, the discussion of the political left's differences and searching for consensus in action. The following conferences reinstate the participants' willingness to exchange experiences and develop a dialogue, while at the regional and continental level FSP's influence grows, with some of its members achieving electoral success and their candidates reaching the presidency of many countries.

During the early 1990s, the FSP was seen by some as expressing the emergence of a new Latin American leftist paradigm: non-authoritarian, de-militarized and grassroots-friendly. As others have noted, however, there is a marked contradiction between the fiery and quasi-revolutionary rhetoric about "socialism of the 21st century" indulged in sometimes by many FSP's leaders, and the plain fact that the positions of power held by such leaders depend, on most cases, on their holding positions in governments which have emerged through the electoral road. In a statement made in 2008 in Lima, before a gathering of Peruvian businessmen, however, Brazil's President Lula would declare, approvingly, that the FSP had "educated" the Left in the understanding of the existence of possibilities of running for elections and gaining power through the democratic way – a declaration that prompted a comment from AFP, reproduced at the Rede Globo site, to the effect that the hallmark of FSP's activities had been its "very moderate" character.

Nevertheless, almost since its inception, the FSP has been the target of criticism from the right in the United States and Latin America, especially in Brazil, describing it as an organization promoting terrorism and/or a revival of communism, something regarded even by mainstream conservatives as unfounded and "exaggerated to say the least". The allegedly subversive character of the Foro's activities, however, was revived during the 2010 Brazilian presidential election campaign, as the vice-presidential candidate in the José Serra ticket, Antônio Pedro de Siqueira Indio da Costa, denounced repeatedly the supposed connection, by way of the Foro, between the Brazilian Workers' Party and the FARC. Alternatively, the Foro is seen also as more than a simple regular gathering, in that policies that had been advised by it came to be actively implemented later – such as the strengthening of Mercosur, or the setting up of Unasur – but that the Foro was better understood as a "brainstorming organization", a "think-tank for politicians".

During the fifth meeting (Montevideo, 1995) a dispute arose about the attendance of the Movimiento Bolivia Libre, which was charged, in a motion presented by ten parties, led by Argentina's Partido Obrero, of support to the repressive actions of the neoliberal government of Gonzalo Sánchez de Lozada in Bolivia. The refusal of the motion by the Foro's plenum led to the permanent withdrawal of Partido Obrero from the meeting. Partido Obrero had already declared itself in opposition to the Foro's positions, having previously made public a note in which it protested against the change in the official name of the organization, as "offering evidence of putting, in the place of actual making of common policies, a kind of purely academic workshop, [a sure sign] of conscious depoliticization leading eventually to the cover-up of rightist policies".

During the 14th meeting in El Salvador, it was resolved that the Foro should organize a number of subordinate organizations and facilities: an electronic bulletin on the Net, a politic-cultural festival, an electoral observatory and a cadre school.

In the final declaration of the FSP's 15th meeting in Montevideo, there is a reinstatement and updating of the Foro's goals: to aid "the progressive forces in the continent who are in power and strive in various ways to build projects which – according to each country's particular characteristics – allow them to face the main problems generated by neoliberalism" – something which added to the statement made at the same time by Belela Herrera, International Relations chargé of the Uruguayan Broad Front, that issues like ecology, exclusion, racism and xenophobia had added themselves inseparably to the Left's traditional agenda. The meeting also debated the ongoing Colombian armed conflict, which prompted a declaration by the International Relations Secretary of the Brazilian Workers' Party, Valter Pomar, who exposed what in his view was the Foro's general stance towards the current Colombian situation: "In Colombia we have a military confrontation that has been going on for decades, having as its players the [Colombian] State, as well as the paramilitary and insurgent forces. The Foro is interested in achieving peace and in having a negotiated process towards reaching this goal".

In the 16th meeting, which opened on 20 August 2009 in Mexico City, the Foro was expected to concentrate discussion on the 2009 Honduran constitutional crisis as well as engaging in efforts to the restoration of the deposed Honduran president Manuel Zelaya. The Vice president of the Mexican Senate, Yeidckol Polevnsky, has invited the Honduran MP Silvia Ayala, as a member of the Democratic Unification Party and leader of the manifestations in support of Zelaya held in San Pedro Sula, to attend the meeting – something that attracted the fury of the pro-government Honduran press.

The ongoing meeting in Mexico will also be the first to organize a parallel youth meeting, where member parties will discuss the impact of the global economic crisis on Latin American youth and the responses that could be offered to it.

In January 2010, the European Left – the broad front of European national Left parties formed in view of a common stand in European politics – at the opening of its Third Congress, expressed its interest in strengthening ties with the FSP.

== Participants ==
Map showing Foro de São Paulo members as of 2026: Member in government Member not in government

=== In government ===
The following countries are currently being governed by leaders and member parties of the Foro de São Paulo:

- Brazil – Luiz Inácio Lula da Silva (Workers' Party/Brazil of Hope) (2023–present)
- Cuba – Miguel Díaz-Canel (Communist Party of Cuba) (2021–present)
- Mexico – Claudia Sheinbaum (Morena) (2024–present)
- Nicaragua – Daniel Ortega/Rosario Murillo (Sandinista National Liberation Front) (2007/2025–present)
- Saint Lucia – Philip J. Pierre (Saint Lucia Labour Party) (2021–present)
- Uruguay – Yamandú Orsi (Movement of Popular Participation/Broad Front) (2025–present)
- Venezuela – Delcy Rodríguez (United Socialist Party of Venezuela/Great Patriotic Pole) (2026–present)

=== As part of a ruling coalition ===
- Guatemala – Winaq (2024–present)

=== Official members ===
Country	Name
Argentina	Broad Front
Argentina	Communist Party of Argentina
Argentina	Communist Party of Argentina (Extraordinary Congress)
Argentina	Evita Movement
Argentina	Freemen of the South Movement
Argentina	Frente Transversal Nacional y Popular
Argentina	Humanist Party
Argentina	Intransigent Party
Argentina	Revolutionary Communist Party
Argentina	Socialist Party
Argentina	Solidary Party
Aruba	Democratic Network
Barbados	People's Empowerment Party
Belize	Belize People's Front
Bolivia	Communist Party of Bolivia
Bolivia	Movement for Socialism
Brazil	Brazilian Communist Party
Brazil	Communist Party of Brazil
Brazil	Democratic Labour Party
Brazil	Workers' Party
Chile	Allendist Socialism Movement
Chile	Communist Party of Chile
Chile	Humanist Party
Chile	Libertarian Left
Chile	Revolutionary Left Movement
Chile	Socialist Party of Chile
Colombia	Alternative Democratic Pole
Colombia	Colombian Communist Party
Colombia	Commons
Colombia	Democratic Unity
Colombia	Green Alliance
Colombia	Historic Pact
Colombia	Humane Colombia
Colombia	Indigenous and Social Alternative Movement (MAIS)
Colombia	Patriotic March
Colombia	Patriotic Union of Colombia
Colombia	Presentes por el Socialismo
Costa Rica	Broad Front
Costa Rica	People's Vanguard Party
Cuba	Communist Party of Cuba
Dominican Republic	Alliance for Democracy
Dominican Republic	Broad Front
Dominican Republic	Communist Party of Labour
Dominican Republic	Country Alliance
Dominican Republic	Democratic Choice
Dominican Republic	Dominican Liberation Party
Dominican Republic	Dominican Revolutionary Party
Dominican Republic	Force of the Revolution
Dominican Republic	People's Force
Dominican Republic	Social Democratic Institutional Bloc
Dominican Republic	United Left Movement
Ecuador	Communist Party of Ecuador
Ecuador	Ecuadorian Communist Party
Ecuador	Ecuadorian Socialist Party
Ecuador	Marxist–Leninist Communist Party of Ecuador
Ecuador	Pachakutik Plurinational Unity Movement – New Country
Ecuador	Revolución Ciudadana
El Salvador	Farabundo Martí National Liberation Front
Guatemala	Guatemalan National Revolutionary Unity
Guatemala	Tejiendo Pueblo
Guatemala	Winaq
Haiti	Struggling People's Organization
Honduras	Liberty and Refoundation
Mexico	Labor Party
Mexico	National Regeneration Movement
Nicaragua	Sandinista National Liberation Front
Panama	Democratic Revolutionary Party
Paraguay	Citizen Participation Party
Paraguay	Guasú Front
Paraguay	Paraguayan Communist Party
Paraguay	Party for a Country of Solidarity
Paraguay	Party of the Movement Towards Socialism
Paraguay	Popular Patriotic Movement Party
Paraguay	Popular Socialist Convergence Party
Paraguay	Revolutionary Febrerista Party
Paraguay	Tekojoja People's Party
Peru	Communist Party of Peru – Red Fatherland
Peru	Free Peru
Peru	Land and Liberty
Peru	Peruvian Communist Party
Peru	Peruvian Humanist Party
Peru	Peruvian Nationalist Party
Peru	Socialist Party
Peru	United People's Party
Puerto Rico	Communist Party of Puerto Rico
Puerto Rico	Hostosian National Independence Movement
Puerto Rico	Revolutionary Nationalist Movement
Puerto Rico	Socialist Front
Saint Lucia	Saint Lucia Labour Party
Trinidad and Tobago	Movement for Social Justice
Uruguay	Artiguist Tendency
Uruguay	Broad Front
Uruguay	Communist Party of Uruguay
Uruguay	March 26 Movement
Uruguay	Movement of Popular Participation
Uruguay	People's Victory Party
Uruguay	Socialist Party of Uruguay
Uruguay	Uruguay Assembly
Venezuela	Communist Party of Venezuela
Venezuela	Fatherland for All
Venezuela	United Socialist Party of Venezuela
Venezuela	We Are Venezuela Movement

=== Associate members ===
Country	Name	Notes
United States	Democratic Socialists of America	Became associate members of the forum in 2023.

=== Former members ===
Country	Name	Notes
Brazil	Brazilian Socialist Party	Withdrew from the Foro in 2019 due to the Foro's support of the Nicolás Maduro government in Venezuela.
Brazil	Popular Socialist Party	Withdrew from the Foro in 2004 due to the Foro's support of the Fidel Castro and Hugo Chávez governments in Cuba and Venezuela.
Ecuador	PAIS Alliance	Left the Foro in 2021 following the renaming as the MOVER Movement.
United States	Green Party of the United States (associate)	Voted to join as an associate member in 2019 and began appointing delegates to the forum. Rejoined the Global Greens in 2026.

== Meetings and organization ==
Meetings were held in São Paulo (1990), Mexico City (1991), Managua (1992), Havana (1993), Montevideo (1995), San Salvador (1996), Porto Alegre (1997), Mexico City (1998), Managua (2000), Havana (2001), Antigua Guatemala (2002), Quito (2003), São Paulo (2005), San Salvador (2007), Montevideo (2008), Mexico City (2009), Buenos Aires (2010), Managua (2011), Caracas (2012), São Paulo (2013), La Paz (2014), Mexico City (2015), San Salvador (2016), Managua (2017), Havana (2018), Caracas (2019) and Brasília (2023).

The Foro's chief authority is its meeting itself. Between meetings, the Foro is represented by an Executive Group (Grupo de Trabalho) composed of a sample of its overall membership that usually meets thrice a year as well as by an Executive Secretariat (Secretariado Executivo).

== See also ==
- COPPPAL
- Parliamentary Group of the Left
- Pink tide
- Madrid Forum
- Forum for the Progress and Integration of South America (PROSUR)
