= Ricardo Paredes Romero =

Ecuadorian politician

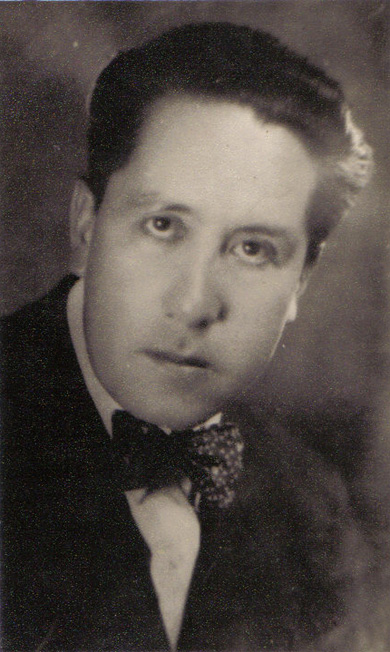
- Born: March 19, 1898; Riobamba, Chimborazo Province, Ecuador
- Died: September 13, 1979 (aged 81)
- Education: Central University of Quito
- Organization: Communist Party of Ecuador (formerly known as the Ecuadorian Socialist Party)
- Notable work: Gold and Blood in Portovelo
- Title: General Secretary of the Communist Party of Ecuador
- Term: 1937-1952
- Parents: Alejandro Paredes Pérez (father); María Romero Gallegos (mother)

Ricardo Paredes Romero (March 19, 1898 - September 13, 1979) was an Ecuadorian physician, writer, naturalist, and social scientist. He was the founder of the Communist Party of Ecuador (PCE) in 1931 and a candidate for President of Ecuador in 1933.

== Early life and medical studies ==
Ricardo Paredes Romero was born in 1898 in Riobamba, the capital of Chimborazo Province in Ecuador. His father, Alejandro Paredes Pérez, was an employee of the Ministry of Economy, and died when he was 4 years old. His mother, María Romero Gallegos, was a businesswoman as well as raising her four children on her own.

Ricardo attended the Jesuit school San Felipe Nery between 1908 and 1913. During this time, he organized a group of acquaintances to protest against the punishments students were being subjected to, going as far as occupying the school's administration building. As a result, he was expelled, imprisoned for one day to be questioned, and had to complete his final year at a different institution.

In 1914, he enrolled in the Faculty of Medicine at the Central University of Quito, where he took an interest in studying the damage caused by syphilis in pregnant women and their children. This topic would be central to his research, and during his undergraduate studies he closely followed such cases in Quito. Treating syphilis as a social issue, he became aware of the link between the epidemic and socioeconomic contradictions of the Ecuadorian population, and began to study the possibilities of state action in combating the disease.

In 1921, he graduated as a doctor at the age of 23. From then on he practiced as a gynecologist, engaging in the fight against venereal diseases.

Throughout the 1920s, he focused on deepening his humanistic and philosophical knowledge; coming into contact with the works of Voltaire, Rousseau, Marx, Engels, and Lenin, as well as socialist publications produced in the Soviet Union.

From 1922 to 1923, he taught biology at the same university from which he graduated, as well as starting a medical practice in the center of Quito.

In 1928, he worked as an army doctor in Portoviejo. There he met Zoila Modesta Flor Cedeño, with whom he married and had five children.

== Political path and career ==
In November 1924, he and some colleagues launched the magazine La Antorcha, which challenged the policies of then-president José Luis Tamayo. In 1925, the periodical was renamed La Antorcha Socialista. Later that year, he promoted the formation of a group of socialists in Guayas. Working alongside the mentors of the Juliana Revolution, the group deposed then-president Gonzalo Córdova in a coup d'état in July 1925, replacing him with a governing junta.

In an attempt to better involve the lower-class in the revolution, Ricardo dedicated himself to building a communist movement in Cayambe, north of Quito. There he met community leader Jesús Gualavisí and invited him to participate in the Socialist Assembly in Quito in hopes of founding a socialist party. In May 1926, with the participation of socialist groups from various parts of the country, the Ecuadorian Socialist Party was formed.

In 1928, representing the Ecuadorian Socialist Party in Moscow during the VI Congress of the Third Communist International, he presented this proposal to the party, which generated strong disputes and eventually culminated in an internal division.

In 1931, due to its affiliation with Communist International, the Ecuadorian Socialist Party became known as the Communist Party of Ecuador.

In 1935, he participated in the VII Congress of the Communist International, whose central theme was the danger of the expansion of fascism.

In early 1937, he was elected general secretary of the Ecuadorian Communist Party, which he remained until 1952.

In 1947, as the Senator of Ecuador, he fought for the return of the Galápagos Islands, which had been ceded by the government of President José María Velasco Ibarra to the United States. He championed the 200-mile territorial sea limit, setting a precedent for this claim in other countries Latin America.

Among other books, he wrote Gold and Blood in Portovelo, in which he denounces the exploitative conditions of miners in the province of El Oro.

He organized communist party sections in Manta and Esmeraldas, fighting for work in the ports, education, and health of these cities.

His influence on the Ecuadorian indigenous movement is profound, as evidenced by the biographies of peasant leaders Dolores Cacuango, Jesús Gualavisi, and Tránsito Amaguaña.

Called by the Apostle of Ecuadorian Communism, he lived and died in consistency with his ideals, fighting for a more just Ecuador and relentlessly combating racism and regionalism.
