= United Front (Ecuador) =

Political coalition in Ecuador

UNITED Front Frente UNIDOS
- Leader: Rafael Correa (2014-2017); Lenín Moreno (2017-2018)
- General Secretary: Patricio Zambrano
- Founded: June 2014
- Dissolved: August 2018
- Succeeded by: Union for Hope (de facto)
- Headquarters: Quito
- Political position: Centre-left to Left-wing

The UNITED Front (Spanish: Frente UNIDOS, FE) was an Ecuadorian left-wing electoral alliance, formed with the objective of supporting the government of Rafael Correa, and his Citizens' Revolution project. The United Front was formed following the results of the 2014 Ecuadorian local elections, in what Correa dubbed the "Conservative Restoration", and was primarily coordinated by the PAIS Alliance.

== History ==
In April 2015, the Avanza Party withdrew from the coalition following a disagreement between party leader Ramiro González Jaramillo and Rafael Correa concerning changes to the Ecuadorian Institute of Social Security.

In October 2016, the Democratic Center Movement (MCD) was expelled from the coalition following a public spat between MCD leader Jimmy Jairala and Rafael Correa, which lead to MCD supporting Paco Moncayo in the 2017 Ecuadorian general election.

During the 2017 Ecuadorian general election, the PAIS Alliance joined with member parties to contest certain provinces (stated below). The United Front supported the candidacy of Lenín Moreno, who won the presidential elections with 51.16% of the vote.

The United Front was dissolved in 2018 following Lenín Moreno's shift to the right, and away from the policies of Correa.

== Membership ==
National, provincial, unregistered, and former members:

National
Party	Nº	Ideology	Political Position
PAIS Alliance	35	Correism; Democratic socialism; Left-wing populism	Left-wing
Ecuadorian Socialist Party	17	Social democracy; Democratic socialism	Centre-left to left-wing
Provincial
Party		Province	
Agrarian Integration Movement San Miguel		Bolívar	
Pachakutik Plurinational Unity Movement – New Country		Chimborazo	
Regional Autonomous Movement		El Oro	
Regional Action for Equity		Loja	
Bolivarian Alfarista Alliance Movement		Los Ríos	
First Unit Movement		Manabí	
People's Movement		Orellana	
Citizen Struggle Front		Santa Elena	
Revolutionary Left Movement		Zamora-Chinchipe	
Unregistered
Communist Party of Ecuador
Ecuadorian Communist Party
Communist Youth of Ecuador
Political Movement - Alfaro Vive, Carajo
Movement Building Development and Ecuadorian Citizen Unity
Amazonía Life Front
Former
Party	Nº	Ideology	Political Position
Avanza Party	8	Social-democracy (formerly); Neoliberalism	Right-Wing
Democratic Center Movement	1	Progressivism; Personalism; Populism	Center to center-left
