= Communist Party of Ecuador =

Communist political party in Ecuador)

Communist Party of Ecuador Partido Comunista del Ecuador
- Abbreviation: PCE
- General Secretary: Winston Alarcón Elizalde
- Founded: May 23, 1926
- Headquarters: Quito
- Newspaper: El Pueblo
- Youth wing: Communist Youth of Ecuador
- Union Affiliate: Ecuadorian Workers Confederation
- Ideology: Communism; Marxism–Leninism
- Political position: Far-left
- National affiliation: United Front (2014-2018)
- Regional affiliation: São Paulo Forum
- International affiliation: IMCWP; World Anti-Imperialist Platform
- Colours: Red

Party flag
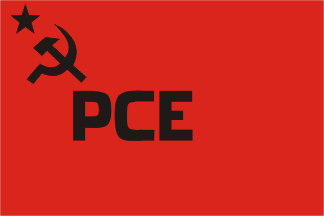

Website
- pcecuadorcc

The Communist Party of Ecuador (Spanish: Partido Comunista del Ecuador) is a Marxist-Leninist party in Ecuador that split from the Socialist Party in 1930, after having been a part of the PSE since the party's inception in 1926. The party still maintains its founding year as 1926. The party publishes El Pueblo, the general secretary is Winston Alarcón and the youth wing of the PCE is the Communist Youth of Ecuador

== History ==
=== Background ===
One of the origins of left-wing radicalism in Ecuador can be traced back to the Montonero Alfarista Guerillas of the Liberal Revolution of 1895, which was influenced by indigenous leaders like Jesús Gualavisí and Ambrosio Lasso. Gualavisí was an Indigenous leader from Cayambe, and a founding member of the Socialist Party of Ecuador (PSE); Lasso was a member of Alejo Sáes' army and leader of the Battle of Chuquirá in 1935. The events of the 1922 Guayaquil general strike and July Revolution led to the foundation of the forerunners of both the Communist and Socialist Parties of Ecuador; the Núcleo Socialista de Pichincha Province and the Sección Comunista de Propaganda y Acción Lenin. Both predecessor organizations were founded in Quito in September 1925, which in turn were mainly supported by the activists of the short-lived newspaper La Antorcha, founded in 1924 (including Ricardo Paredes Romero, Leonardo Muñoz and the poet Jorge Carrera Andrade ). The Mexican politician and diplomat Rafael Ramos Pedrueza was the inspiration for the founding of the Sección Comunista. The Sección Comunista dissolved soon after Ramos Pedrueza was recalled from Ecuador, while the Socialist Party (PSE), was founded in 1926. When it was founded, the party was internally divided. It joined the Communist International on its second attempt, at whose sixth congress Ricardo Paredes was the only Ecuadorian representative after the more socialist/left-liberal oriented general secretary Carrera Andrade was not granted a visa for the Soviet Union in time. Paredes subsequently replaced Carrera Andrade as general secretary and pursued a course of orientation of the PSE as a communist party, which was renamed Partido Socialista Ecuatoriano, sección de la III Internacional Comunista in 1929. In 1931 there was a rift between revolutionary communists loyal to Moscow and more reform-oriented "socialists" in the party, which was subsequently renamed "Partido Comunista del Ecuador" under the leadership of Paredes. In 1933 the Socialist Party was re-founded by members who did not follow the line of the communist party.

During the May 28 Revolution, the Communist Party of Ecuador took an active role in the coup, as party member Nela Martínez orchestrated the takeover of the Government Palace, and for four days she was in charge of the Ecuadorian government. Following the Revolution, Pedro Saad Herrería assumed an advisory role to José María Velasco Ibarra

The Third Congress took place clandestinely in May 1946, led by Paredes Romero, following Velasco Ibarra's self-proclamation as dictator and the dissolution of the 1945 Constituent Assembly. During this Congress, Paredes Romero made his first significant self-criticism regarding his "politics of alliances." He acknowledged the erroneous prejudices about "imperialist monopolies" and "semi-coloniality," and dismantled the "Browderite" positions within his ranks.

=== Sino-Soviet Split ===
In 1946, after the failure of the alliance with conservative José María Velasco Ibarra, the party lost its legal registration and was forced underground, with the consequent imprisonment of numerous members. The party was made legal again a few years later, under the presidency of Galo Plaza. Following the 1963 coup d'état and junta, The party was criminalized again, and during this second stage in hiding, it experienced its major split, which later became established as the Marxist–Leninist Communist Party of Ecuador (PCMLE) in 1964.

The Sixth Congress of the PCE declared the urgent need to create a 'Social and National Liberation Front' as a tactical objective, advocating for a non-peaceful path towards Socialism without specifying the forms of struggle to be employed by the Party (whether legal, illegal, or clandestine). This stance led to ideological conflicts within the PCE.

As a result, two sects emerged: one led by Rafael Echeverría Flores, who joined the party after the May 28 Revolution, and the other by the party's old guard under Pedro Saad Herrería. The ideological struggles were further complicated by regionalist tensions exacerbated by CIA infiltration and the failure of a guerrilla project on the banks of the Toachi River in the Santo Domingo de los Tsáchilas Province, culminated in the division of the party and the founding of the PCMLE.

Philip Agee, former CIA agent, wrote a book detailing the infiltration of the PCE. He claimed the PCE was the "most organized force" of the Ecuadorian left in the 1960s, and that targeting the Communist Party of Ecuador was the CIA's primary objective in the country. The CIA carried out various actions, including burning the party's library and staging attacks against church leaders. The Agency's most prominent action in infiltrating the PCE was surrounding Provincial Committee of Pichincha leader Rafael Echeverría Flores with informants. Agee's book, "Inside the Company: CIA Diary" identifies these informants as Mario Cárdenas, Atahualpa Basantes, and Luis Vargas. After the subsequent formation of the PCMLE, some of these agents followed Echeverría in leading the new party but were expelled in 1966 due to repeated accusations of being police informants.

=== Government of Rafael Correa ===
In November 2010, Edwin Pérez, the general secretary of the Communist Youth, was killed in an attack by a far-right group.

In 2012, the party experienced another split when members of the "Communist Youth of Ecuador" were expelled for engaging in activities not authorized by the Central Committee. These expelled members subsequently formed the Ecuadorian Communist Party (ECP). The ECP focused primarily on Socialism of the 21st century and Hugo Chávez's Bolivarianism. The communist party joined Correa's United Front in 2014.

== Popular Democratic Union and the Broad Left Front (FADI) ==
The communist party was legally recognized until the 1960s, maintaining its existence but forming other political structures that represented it electorally, the first of these being the Popular Democratic Union. During the 1968 Ecuadorian general election, the party nominated Elías Gallegos, who obtained 2% of the vote. For the 1978–79 Ecuadorian general election, the Party changed the name of the "Popular Democratic Union", to the "Broad Left Front" (FADI). Candidate René Maugé obtained 4.74% of the vote.

In the following 1984 Ecuadorian general election, both the Socialist Party and the PCE both fielded presidential candidates, Manuel Salgado for the PSE, who came in last place, and René Maugé for the FADI, who came in eighth place. 1984 marked a turning point for the communist party as in subsequent elections, FADI began to decline in electoral strength, and the PSE began to grow.

In 1995, the Socialist Party of Ecuador and FADI merged to form the Socialist Party – Broad Front of Ecuador. During the subsequent internal restructuring, the Socialist Party gained greater influence, leading to the Communist Party losing its electoral representation.

Logo of the Broad Left Front
