= Fernando Cordero Cueva =

Ecuadorian politician and architect

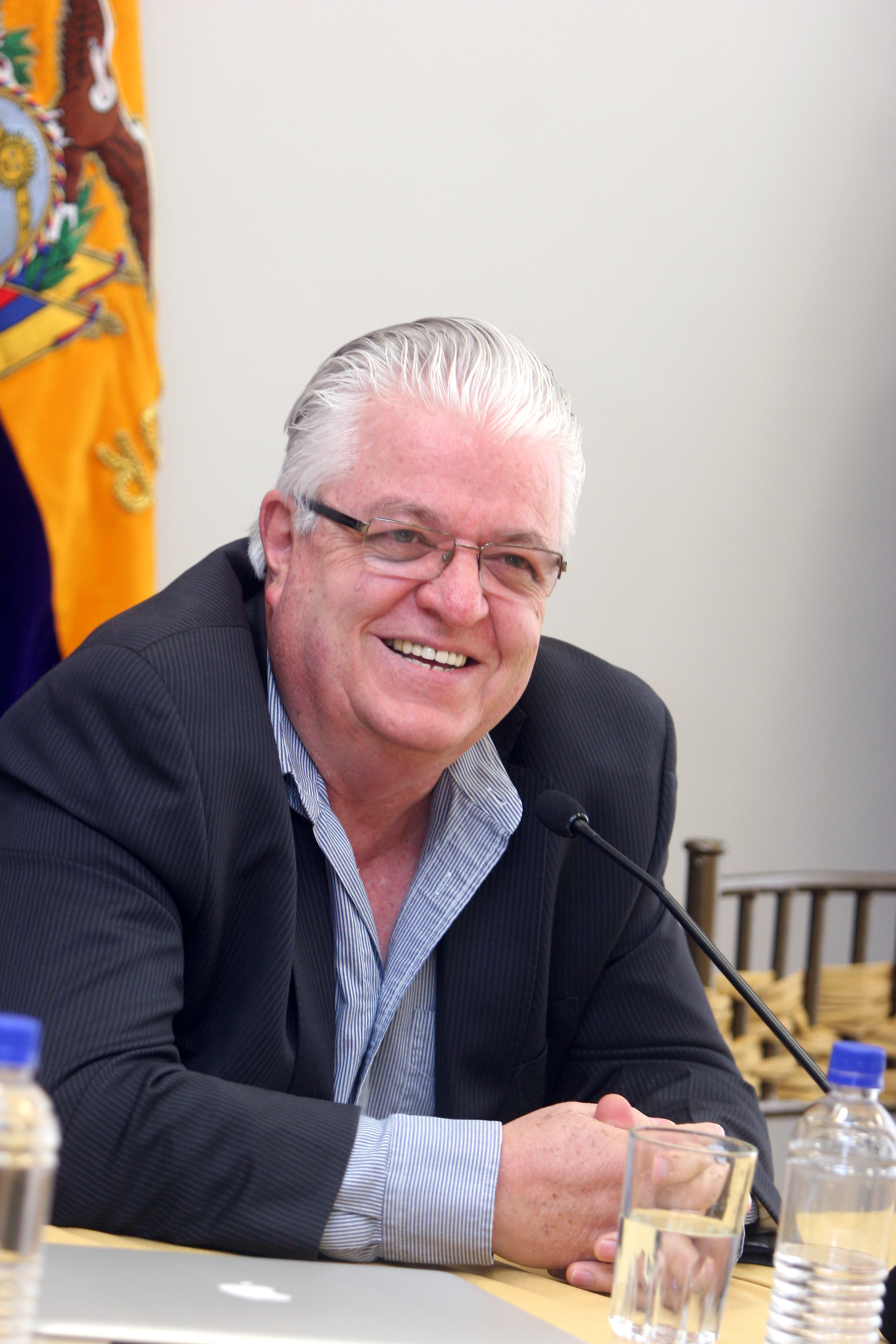

Minister of National Defence
- In office September 24, 2014 – March 1, 2016
- President: Rafael Correa
- Preceded by: María Fernanda Espinosa
- Succeeded by: Ricardo Patiño

1st President of the National Assembly
- In office July 31, 2009 – May 14, 2013
- Preceded by: Himself (as President of the Legislative and Accountability Commission)
- Succeeded by: Gabriela Rivadeneira

President of the Legislative and Accountability Commission
- In office October 27, 2008 – July 21, 2009
- Preceded by: Himself (as President of the Ecuadorian Constituent Assembly)
- Succeeded by: Himself (as President of the National Assembly)

President of the Ecuadorian Constituent Assembly
- In office June 27, 2008 – October 27, 2008
- Preceded by: Alberto Acosta
- Succeeded by: Himself (as President of the Legislative and Accountability Commission)

Mayor of Cuenca
- In office August 10, 1996 – January 5, 2005
- Preceded by: Xavier Muñoz Chávez
- Succeeded by: Marcelo Cabrera Palacios

Personal details
- Born: 27 May 1952 (age 74) Cuenca, Ecuador
- Party: PAIS Alliance
- Spouse: Nelly Carvallo
- Education: University of Cuenca; Complutense University of Madrid

Juan Fernando Cordero Cueva (born May 27, 1952) is an Ecuadorian politician and architect. He was the mayor of Cuenca between 1996 and 2005. He was also Member of the Ecuadorian Congress and President of the Ecuadorian Constituent Assembly in 2008. Between 2009 and 2013 he was President of the National Assembly. From September 2014 to March 2016 he was Minister of National Defence. He is also publicly known as Corcho Cordero.

== Career ==
Cordero was born 1952 in Cuenca the son of Leonardo Cordero Vega and his wife, Beatriz Cueva Jaramillo. His maternal grandfather was the recognized politician Carlos Cueva Tamaríz.

Cordero studied architecture at the University of Cuenca, of which he later served as dean in 1989–1991 and 1994–1996. He graduated 1975, absolved a post-gradual program in Brazil until 1977 and obtained later a Master's degree in Urbanism at the Complutense University of Madrid in 2007. He has been a professor at his alma mater since 1977 and has been involved in international architectural organizations such as Sociedad Interamericana de Planificación. He was elected mayor of Cuenca in 1996 and was reelected for a second term in 2000. As such he won 2004 a prize for the best work as mayor in Ecuador among 22 participants. 2006 Cueva was elected member of the Ecuadorian Congress as the most voted candidate in the country and 2007 of the Ecuadorian Constituent Assembly.

Cordero Cueva was later elected President of the National Assembly, and was appointed Minister of National Defense on September 26, 2014, a position he served through March 1, 2016. He succeeded María Fernanda Espinosa, and was himself succeeded by Ricardo Patiño.

Cordero Cueva is married to Nelly Carvallo and has three children.
