= Aminta Buenaño =

Ecuadorian writer and politician (born 1958)

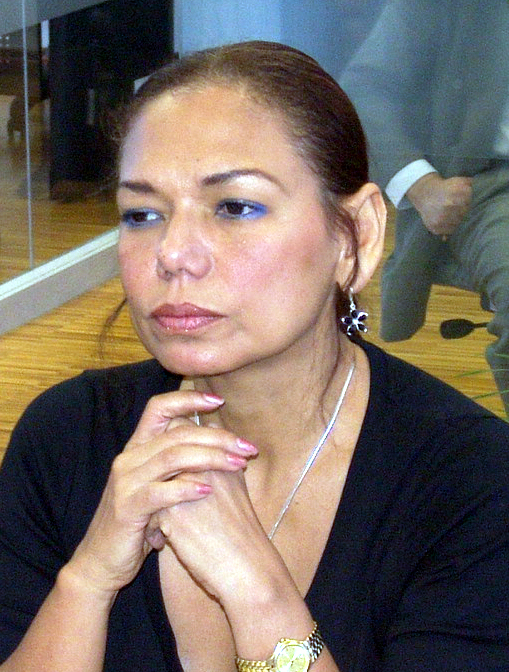
(2009)

Aminta Buenaño Rugel (born Santa Lucía Canton, Guayas Province, 1958) is an Ecuadorian writer and politician.

== Biography ==
She has worked for the publication El Universo, in Guayaquil.

In 2007, she joined Ecuadorian Constituent Assembly, as a member of PAIS Alliance. She was congressional vice-president. She has also helped write the 2008 Constitution of Ecuador.

In 2011, she was appointed in 2011 as Ecuador's ambassador to Spain.

On April 3, 2014, she was appointed ambassador to Nicaragua, with extra accreditation as non-resident to Barbados. She was dismissed on February 22, 2017

== Prizes ==
- International Short Story Award Jauja de Valladolid (1979).
- National Short Story Award Diario El Tiempo.

== Works ==
- La mansión de los sueños (Guayaquil, 1985)
- La otra piel (Guayaquil, 1992)
- Mujeres divinas (2006)

=== Anthologies ===
- Mujeres ecuatorianas en el relato (1988)
- Primera Bienal del Cuento Ecuatoriano "Pablo Palacio" (Quito, 1991)
- Veintiún cuentistas ecuatorianos (Quito, 1996)
- Antología de narradoras ecuatorianas (Quito, 1997)
- 40 cuentos ecuatorianos (Quito, 1997)
- Antología básica del cuento ecuatoriano (Quito, 1998)
