= Pink tide =

21st-century success of left-leaning Latin American leaders

Map of Latin America depicting the ruling party of each country by São Paulo Forum affiliation. Red depicts member parties (left-wing) and blue depicts non-member parties (right-wing) in 2011 (left), 2018 (center), and 2026 (right).

The pink tide (Spanish: marea rosa; Portuguese: onda rosa), or the turn to the left (Spanish: giro a la izquierda; Portuguese: virada à esquerda), was a political wave and turn towards left-wing governments in Latin America throughout the 21st century. As a term, both phrases are used in political analysis in the news media and elsewhere to refer to a move toward more economically progressive or socially progressive policies in the region. Such governments have been referred to as "left-of-centre", "left-leaning", and "radical social-democratic". They are also members of the São Paulo Forum, a conference of left-wing political parties and other organizations from the Americas.

The Latin American countries viewed as part of this ideological trend have been referred to as pink tide nations, with the term post-neoliberalism or socialism of the 21st century also being used to describe the movement. Elements of the movement have included a rejection of the Washington Consensus. At the same time, some pink tide governments, such as those of Argentina, Brazil, and Venezuela, have been varyingly characterized as being anti-American, prone to populism, as well as authoritarian, particularly in the case of Nicaragua and Venezuela by the 2010s, although many others remained democratic.

The pink tide was followed by the conservative wave, a political phenomenon that emerged in the early 2010s as a direct reaction to the pink tide. Some authors have proposed that there are multiple distinct pink tides rather than a single one, with the first pink tide happening during the late 1990s and early 2000s and a second pink tide encompassing the elections of the late 2010s to early 2020s. A resurgence of the pink tide was kicked off by Mexico in 2018 and Argentina in 2019 and further established by Bolivia in 2020, along with Peru, Honduras, and Chile in 2021, and then Colombia and Brazil in 2022, with Colombia electing the first left-wing president in their history. In 2023, centre-left Bernardo Arévalo secured a surprise victory in Guatemala. In 2024, Claudia Sheinbaum won the Mexican presidency in a landslide, a continuation of Andrés Manuel López Obrador's left-wing government, and Yamandú Orsi's victory in Uruguay marked a return to power for the Broad Front.

However, during the mid-2020s the second pink tide has been dissipating, with countries such as Argentina, Bolivia, Chile, Colombia, Honduras, Panama, and Peru electing right-leaning governments, leading to some believing a "second conservative wave" is now ongoing. The new trend was cemented by the strikes on Venezuela and the capture of president Nicolás Maduro in early January 2026, along with threats from US president Donald Trump towards the then Colombian president Gustavo Petro. The trend was not uniform, however, with Flavio Bolsonaro being defeated by left-leaning incumbent Lula da Silva during the 2026 Brazilian general election.

== History ==
=== Rise of the left: 1990s and 2000s ===
Following the third wave of democratization in the 1980s, the institutionalisation of electoral competition in Latin America opened up the possibility for the left to ascend to power. For much of the region's history, formal electoral contestation excluded leftist movements, first through limited suffrage and later through military intervention and repression during the second half of the 20th century. The dissolution of the Soviet Union and the end of the Cold War changed the geopolitical environment, as many revolutionary movements vanished, and the left embraced the core tenets of capitalism. In turn, the United States no longer perceived leftist governments as a security threat, creating a political opening for the left.

In the 1990s, as the Latin American elite no longer feared a communist takeover of their assets, the left exploited this opportunity to solidify their base, run for local offices, and gain experience governing on the local level. At the end of the 1990s and early 2000s, the region's initial unsuccessful attempts with the neoliberal policies of privatisation, cuts in social spending, and foreign investment left countries with high levels of unemployment, inflation, and rising social inequality.

This period saw increasing numbers of people working in the informal economy and suffering material insecurity, and ties between the working classes and the traditional political parties weakening, resulting in a growth of mass protest against the negative social effects of these policies, such as the piqueteros in Argentina, and in Bolivia indigenous and peasant movements rooted among small coca farmers, or cocaleros, whose activism culminated in the Bolivian gas conflict of the early-to-mid 2000s. The left's social platforms, which were centered on economic change and redistributive policies, offered an attractive alternative that mobilized large sectors of the population across the region, who voted leftist leaders into office.

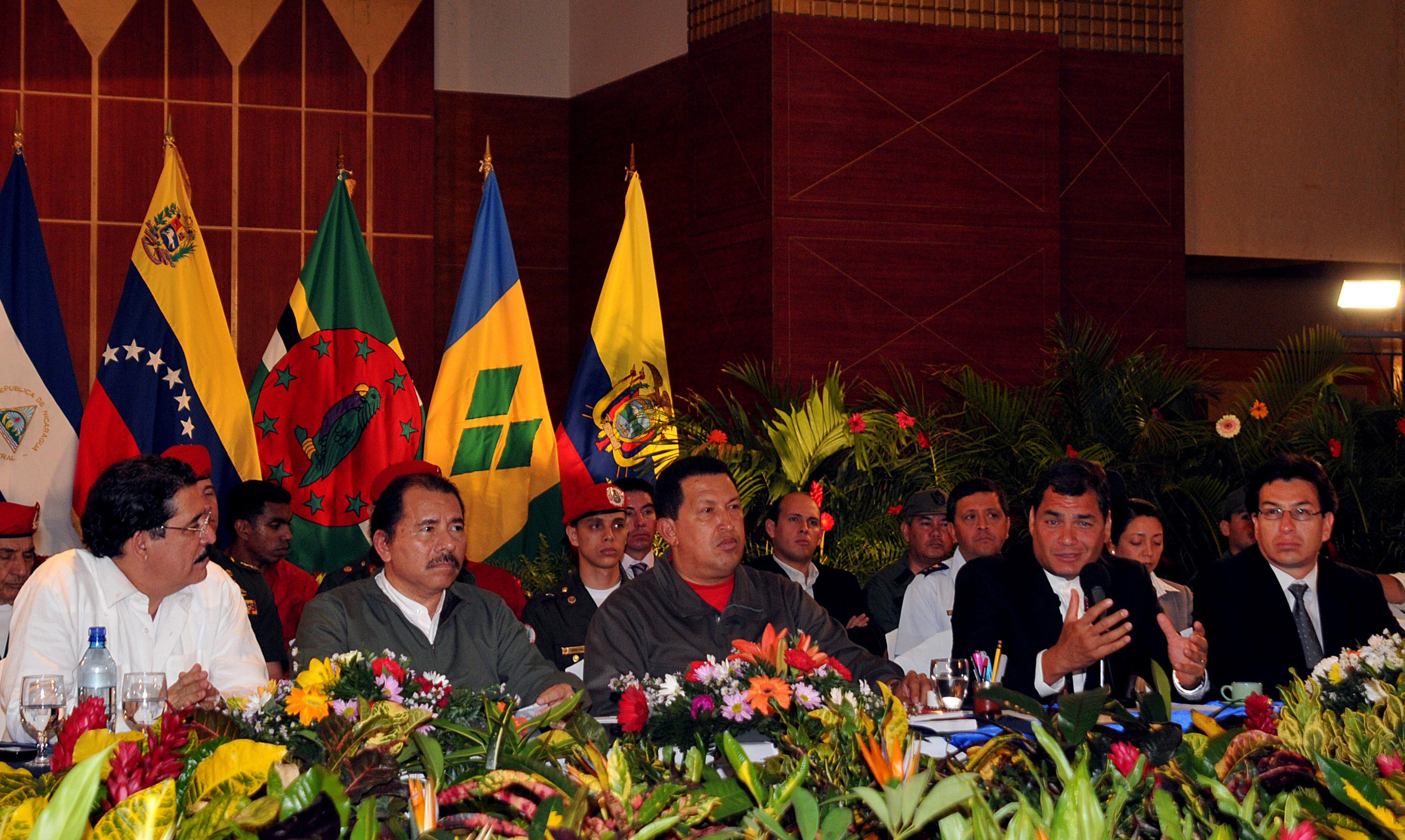
ALBA was founded by left-wing populist leaders such as Nicaraguan revolutionary Daniel Ortega, Venezuelan president Hugo Chávez, and Bolivian president Evo Morales.

The pink tide was led by Hugo Chávez of Venezuela, who was elected into the presidency in 1998. National policies among the left in Latin America are divided between the styles of Chávez and Luiz Inácio Lula da Silva, as the latter not only focused on those affected by inequality but also catered to private enterprises and global capital. Lucio Gutiérrez imitated Chávez, staged a coup d'état in 2000 and was elected in 2002 on a leftist platform but by 2003, the Indigenist Pachakutik and CONAIE withdrew their support seeing him as a traitor and in 2005, protests led to his removal from power. In 2006, Rafael Correa was elected president. In Bolivia, Evo Morales unexpectedly came second in the 2002 presidential election and was elected by a large margin in 2005. In 2006, Daniel Ortega returned to power in Nicaragua.

Commenting on the rise of left-wing governments in the region, one observer in a 2007 study noted that “Now anti-imperialist and anti-capitalist governments such as Venezuela (Chavez), Cuba (Castro), Bolivia (Morales) and Ecuador (Correa) have been joined by nationalist centre-left governments such as Brazil (Lula da Silva), Uruguay and Argentina.”

==== Commodities boom and growth ====
With the difficulties facing emerging markets across the world at the time, Latin Americans turned away from liberal economics and elected leftist leaders who had recently turned toward more democratic processes. The popularity of such leftist governments relied upon by their ability to use the 2000s commodities boom to initiate populist policies, such as those used by the Bolivarian government in Venezuela. According to Daniel Lansberg, this resulted in "high public expectations in regard to continuing economic growth, subsidies, and social services". With China becoming a more industrialized nation at the same time and requiring resources for its growing economy, it took advantage of the strained relations with the United States and partnered with the leftist governments in Latin America. South America in particular initially saw a drop in inequality and a growth in its economy as a result of Chinese commodity trade.

As the prices of commodities lowered into the 2010s, coupled with welfare overspending with little savings by pink tide governments, policies became unsustainable and supporters became disenchanted, eventually leading to the rejection of leftist governments. Analysts state that such unsustainable policies were more apparent in Argentina, Brazil, Ecuador, and Venezuela, who received Chinese funds without any oversight. As a result, some scholars have stated that the pink tide's rise and fall was "a byproduct of the commodity cycle's acceleration and decadence".

Some pink tide governments, such as Bolivia, Ecuador, and Venezuela, allegedly ignored international sanctions against Iran, allowing the Iranian government access to funds bypassing sanctions as well as resources such as uranium for the Iranian nuclear program.

=== End of commodity boom and decline: 2010s ===
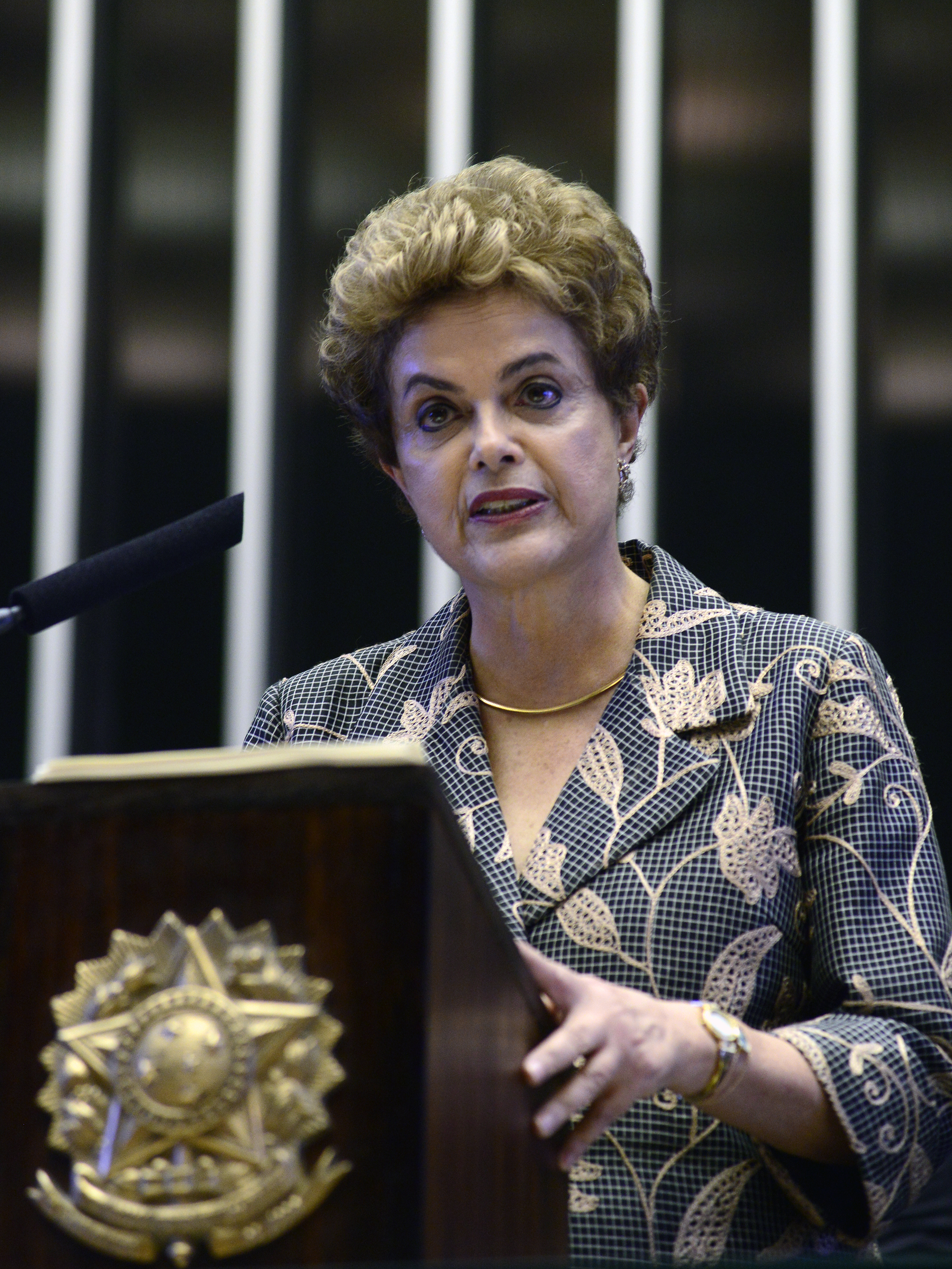
The impeachment of Dilma Rousseff gave rise to the conservative wave in the 2010s.

The US government said Chávez had "dreams of continental domination", was a threat to his own people. According to Michael Reid writing in the Council on Foreign Relations magazine, Foreign Affairs, Chávez' regional influence peaked in 2007 and interest in him waned after Venezuela's dependence on oil revenue led it into an economic crisis and he grew increasingly authoritarian.

In 2009, Honduran president Manuel Zelaya who started off as centre-right but moved to the left was removed in a coup d'état.

The death of Chávez in 2013 left the most radical wing without a clear leader as Nicolás Maduro did not have the international influence and prestige of his predecessor. Chinese trade and loans, which were more favourable than those provided by the International Monetary Fund, resulted in economic growth, a steep fall in poverty, a decline in extreme income inequality, and a swelling of the middle class in South America. By the mid-2010s, Chinese investment in Latin America began to decline.

By 2015, the shift away from the left became more pronounced in Latin America, with The Economist saying the pink tide had ebbed, and Vice News stating that 2015 was "The Year the 'Pink Tide' Turned". In the 2015 Argentine general election, Cristina Fernández de Kirchner's favoured candidate for the presidency Daniel Scioli was defeated by his centre-right opponent Mauricio Macri, against a background of rising inflation, reductions in GDP, and declining prices for soybeans, which was a key export for the country, leading to falls in public revenues and social spending.

Shortly afterwards, the corruption scandal surrounding Petrobras engulfed Brazilian politics and led to the impeachment of Brazilian president Dilma Rousseff, culminating in her removal from office. In Ecuador, retiring president Rafael Correa's successor was his vice-president, Lenín Moreno, who took a narrow victory in the 2017 Ecuadorian general election, a win that received a negative reaction from the business community at home and abroad. However, after his election, Moreno shifted his positions rightwards and sidelined Correa's allies, resulting in Correa branding his former deputy "a traitor" and "a wolf in sheep's clothing".

By 2016, the decline of the pink tide saw an emergence of a "new right" in Latin America, with The New York Times stating "Latin America's leftist ramparts appear to be crumbling because of widespread corruption, a slowdown in China's economy and poor economic choices", with the newspaper elaborating that leftist leaders did not diversify economies, had unsustainable welfare policies and disregarded democratic behaviors. In mid-2016, the Harvard International Review stated that "South America, a historical bastion of populism, has always had a penchant for the left, but the continent's predilection for unsustainable welfarism might be approaching a dramatic end."

Far-right candidate Jair Bolsonaro was elected in Brazil in 2018 Brazilian general election, providing Brazil with its most right-wing government since the military dictatorship.

=== Resurgence: late 2010s and early 2020s ===
Some countries, however, pushed back against the trend and elected more left-leaning leaders, such as Mexico with the electoral victory of Andrés Manuel López Obrador in the 2018 Mexican general election and Argentina where the incumbent centre-right president Mauricio Macri lost against centre-left challenger Alberto Fernández (Peronist) in the 2019 Argentine general election. This development was later strengthened by the landslide victory of the left-wing Movement for Socialism and its presidential candidate Luis Arce in Bolivia in the 2020 Bolivian general election.

A series of violent protests against austerity measures and income inequality scattered throughout Latin America have also occurred within this period in Chile, Colombia (in 2019 and 2021), Haiti and Ecuador.

This trend continued throughout 2021 and 2022, when multiple left-wing leaders won elections in Latin America. In the 2021 Peruvian general election, Peru elected the maverick peasant union leader Pedro Castillo on a socialist platform, defeating neoliberal rivals. In the 2021 Honduran general election held in November, leftist Xiomara Castro was elected president of Honduras, and weeks later leftist Gabriel Boric won the 2021 Chilean general election to become the new president of Chile. The 2022 Colombian presidential election was won by leftist Gustavo Petro, making him the first left-wing president of Colombia in the country's 212-year history. Lula followed suit in October 2022 by returning to power after narrowly beating Bolsonaro. In 2023, Guatemala elected centre-left Bernardo Arévalo as its president. In 2024, Claudia Sheinbaum won the Mexican presidency in a landslide, a continuation of Andrés Manuel López Obrador's left-wing government, and Yamandú Orsi's victory in Uruguay marked a return to power for the Broad Front.

=== Second decline: mid-2020s ===
Since mid-2022, some political commentators have suggested that Latin America's second pink tide may be dissipating, citing the unpopularity of Boric and the 2022 Chilean national plebiscite, the deposition of Castillo, the shift of many elected leaders towards the political center, the election of conservative Santiago Peña as president of Paraguay and Ecuador's election of centre-right president, Daniel Noboa, over his leftist rival, Luisa González. Also in 2023, Argentina elected —for the first time in the country's history, a right-wing Libertarian candidate, Javier Milei, as president, after November 19's general elections.

The rightward trend in Latin American politics largely continued through 2025. In Ecuador, President Noboa was easily re-elected in a rematch against Luisa González. Noboa's 11% margin of victory was the largest of any Ecuadorian president since the 2013 election. In Bolivia, the ruling Movement for Socialism lost every seat in the Chamber of Senators and all but two seats in the Chamber of Deputies. The presidential election was won by center-right Senator Rodrigo Paz, bringing a right wing government to power in Bolivia for the first time in twenty years. In Chile, right-wing candidate José Antonio Kast defeated Jeannette Jara in the presidential runoff. In Honduras, the highly conservative politician Nasry Asfura narrowly won against the moderately conservative Salvador Nasralla, while the candidate that represented the incumbent Liberty and Refoundation socialist party came in a distant third, with only 19.19% of the vote. Analysts expected the conservative shift to continue into 2026, with right-wing candidates seen as favored to win the 2026 elections in Peru, Colombia, and Brazil. Conservative victories in all eight of the elections in 2025–2026 would likely produce a significant shift to the right across Latin America, and deal a huge blow to the São Paulo Forum (FSP), with the potential new conservative administrations seen as likely to work more closely with the incumbent Second Trump Administration.

On 3 January 2026, the United States launched military strikes on Venezuela, leading to the capture of President Maduro and his wife.

On 2 February 2026, conservative populist candidate Laura Fernandez Delgado won the 2026 Costa Rican general election.

On 21 June 2026, hard-right populist candidate Abelardo de la Espriella won the 2026 Colombian presidential election in the second round against officialist Iván Cepeda, winning by the slimmest margin in Colombian history.

On 29 June 2026, Keiko Fujimori, a right-wing candidate and daughter of former president Alberto Fujimori, narrowly beat left-wing candidate Roberto Sánchez in the 2026 Peruvian general election.

On 4 October 2026, Lula trailed right-wing candidate Flávio Bolsonaro in the first round of the 2026 Brazilian presidential election, though neither candidate won an outright majority, meaning the election went to a runoff. However, in the runoff on 25 October, Lula won reelection for a fourth term.

== Economic outcome ==
=== Economy and social development ===
The pink tide governments aimed to improve the welfare of the constituencies that brought them to power, which they attempted through measures intended to increase wages, such as raising minimum wages, and softening the effects of neoliberal economic policies through expanding welfare spending, such as subsidizing basic services and providing cash transfers to vulnerable groups like the unemployed, mothers outside of formal employment, and the precariat. In Venezuela, the first pink tide government of Chávez increased spending on social welfare, housing, and local infrastructures, and established the Bolivarian missions, decentralised programmes that delivered free services in fields, such as healthcare and education, as well as subsidised food distribution.

Before Lula's election, Brazil suffered from one of the highest rates of poverty in the Americas, with the infamous favelas known internationally for its levels of extreme poverty, malnutrition, and health problems. Extreme poverty was also a problem in rural areas. During Lula's presidency several social programs like Zero Hunger (Fome Zero) were praised internationally for reducing hunger in Brazil, poverty, and inequality, while also improving the health and education of the population. Around 29 million people became middle class during Lula's eight years tenure. During Lula's government, Brazil became an economic power and member of BRICS. Lula ended his tenure with 80% approval ratings.

In Argentina, the administrations of Néstor Kirchner and Cristina Fernández de Kirchner restored sectoral collective bargaining, strengthening trade unions: unionisation increased from 20 percent of the workforce in the 1990s to 30 percent in the 2010s, and wages rose for an increasing proportion of the working class. Universal allocation per child, a conditional cash transfer programme, was introduced in 2009 for families without formal employment and earning less than the minimum wage who ensured their children attended school, received vaccines, and underwent health checks; it covered over two million poor families by 2013, and 29 percent of all Argentinian children by 2015. A 2015 analysis by staff at Argentina's National Scientific and Technical Research Council estimated that the programme had increased school attendance for children between the ages of 15 and 17 by 3.9 percent. The Kirchners also increased social spending significantly: upon Fernández de Kirchner leaving office in 2015, Argentina had the second highest level of social spending as a percentage of GDP in Latin America, behind only Chile. Their administrations also achieved a drop of 20 percentage points in the proportion of the population living on three US dollars a day or less. As a result, Argentina also became one of the most equal countries in the region according to its Gini coefficient.

In Bolivia, Morales's government was praised internationally for its reduction of poverty, increases in economic growth, and the improvement of indigenous, women, and LGBT rights, in the very traditionally minded Bolivian society. During his first five years in office, Bolivia's Gini coefficient saw an unusually sharp reduction from 0.6 to 0.47, indicating a significant drop in income inequality. Rafael Correa, economist from the University of Illinois, won the 2006 Ecuadorian general election following the harsh economic crisis and social turmoil that caused right-wing Lucio Gutiérrez's resignation as president.

Correa, a practicing Catholic influenced by liberation theology, was pragmatic in his economical approach in a similar manner to Morales in Bolivia. Ecuador soon experienced a non-precedent economic growth that bolstered Correa's popularity to the point that he was the most popular president of the Americas' for several years in a row, with an approval rate between 60 and 85%. In Paraguay, Lugo's government was praised for its social reforms, including investments in low-income housing, the introduction of free treatment in public hospitals, the introduction of cash transfers for Paraguay's most impoverished citizens, and indigenous rights.

Some of the initial results after the first pink tide governments were elected in Latin America included a reduction in the income gap, unemployment, extreme poverty, malnutrition and hunger, and rapid increase in literacy. The decrease in these indicators during the same period of time happened faster than in non-pink tide governments. Several of countries ruled by pink tide governments, such as Bolivia, Costa Rica, Ecuador, El Salvador, and Nicaragua, among others, experienced notable economic growth during this period. Both Bolivia and El Salvador also saw a notable reduction in poverty according to the World Bank. Economic hardships occurred in countries such as Argentina, Brazil, and Venezuela, as oil and commodity prices declined and because of their unsustainable policies according to analysts. In regard to the economic situation, the president of Inter-American Dialogue, Michael Shifter, stated: "The United States–Cuban Thaw occurred with Cuba reapproaching the United States when Cuba's main international partner, Venezuela, began experiencing economic hardships."

== Political outcome ==
Following the initiation of the pink tide's policies, the relationship between both left-leaning and right-leaning governments and the public changed. As leftist governments took power in the region, rising commodity prices funded their welfare policies, which lowered inequality and assisted indigenous rights. These policies of leftist governments in the 2000s eventually declined in popularity, resulting in the election of more conservative governments in the 2010s. Some political analysts consider that enduring legacies from the pink tide changed the location of Latin America's center of the political spectrum, forcing right-wing candidates and succeeding governments to also adopt at least some welfare-oriented policies.

Under the Obama administration, which held a less interventionist approach to the region after recognizing that interference would only boost the popularity of populist pink tide leaders like Chávez, Latin American approval of the United States began to improve as well. By the mid-2010s, "negative views of China were widespread" due to the substandard conditions of Chinese goods, professional actions deemed unjust, cultural differences, damage to the Latin American environment and perceptions of Chinese interventionism.

== Term ==
As a term, the pink tide had become prominent in contemporary discussion of Latin American politics in the early 21st century. Origins of the term may be linked to a statement by Larry Rohter, a New York Times reporter in Montevideo who characterized the 2004 Uruguayan general election of Tabaré Vázquez as the president of Uruguay as "not so much a red tide ... as a pink one". The term seems to be a play on words based on red tide—a biological phenomenon of an algal bloom rather than a political one—with red, a color long associated with communism, especially as part of the Red Scare and red-baiting in the United States, being replaced with the lighter tone of pink to indicate the more moderate socialist ideas that gained strength.

Despite the presence of a number of Latin American governments that professed to embracing left-wing politics, it is difficult to categorize Latin American states "according to dominant political tendencies" like red states and blue states in the United States. While this political shift was difficult to quantify, its effects were widely noticed. According to the Institute for Policy Studies, a left-wing think-tank based in Washington, D.C., 2006 meetings of the South American Summit of Nations and the Social Forum for the Integration of Peoples demonstrated that certain discussions that used to take place on the margins of the dominant discourse of neoliberalism, which moved to the center of public sphere and debate.

In the 2011 book The Paradox of Democracy in Latin America: Ten Country Studies of Division and Resilience, Isbester states: "Ultimately, the term 'the Pink Tide' is not a useful analytical tool as it encompasses too wide a range of governments and policies. It includes those actively overturning neoliberalism (Chávez and Morales), those reforming neoliberalism (Lula), those attempting a confusing mixture of both (the Kirchners and Correa), those having rhetoric but lacking the ability to accomplish much (Toledo), and those using anti-neoliberal rhetoric to consolidate power through non-democratic mechanisms (Ortega)."

== Reception ==
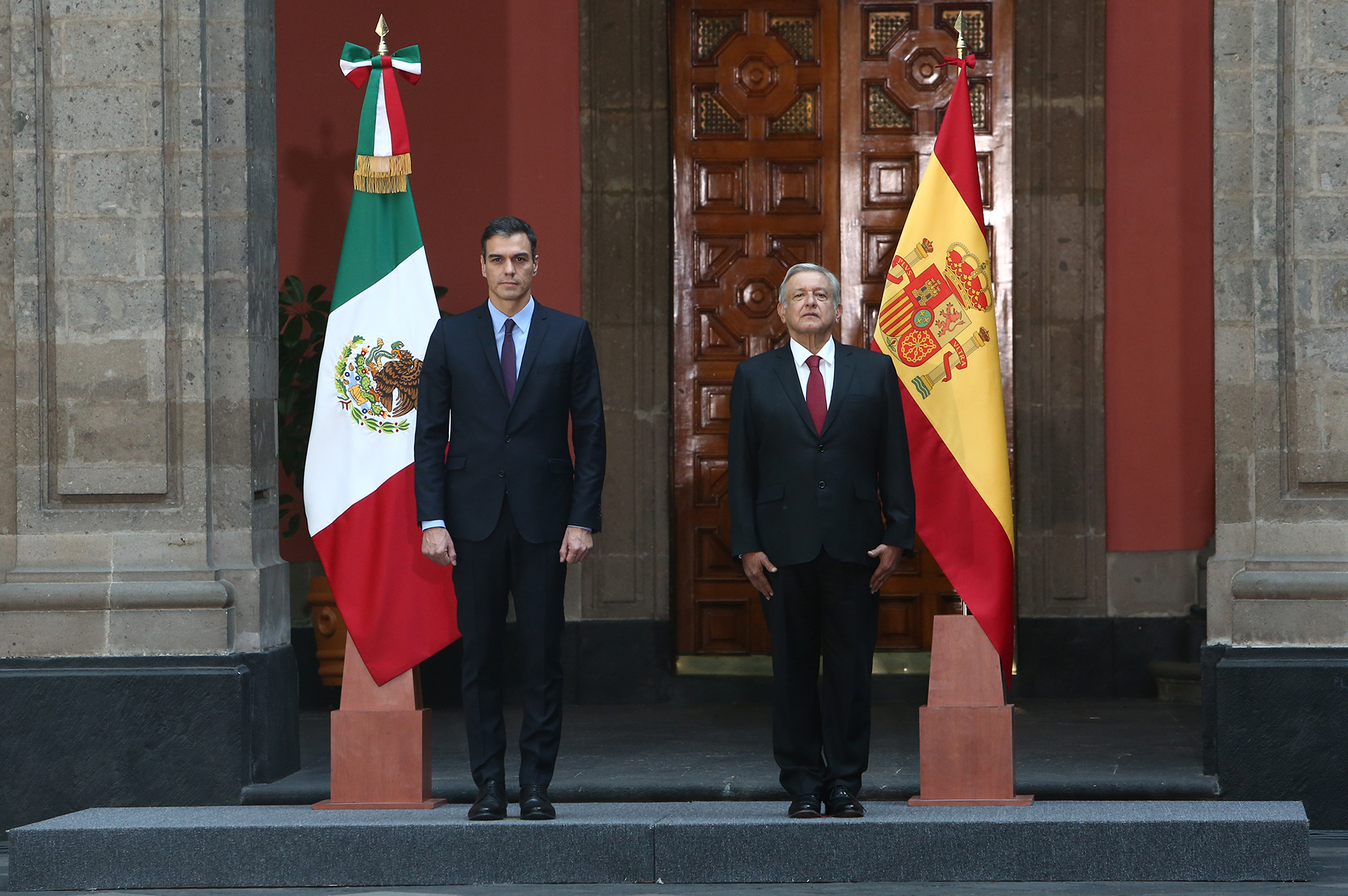
Andrés Manuel López Obrador with Pedro Sánchez in January 2019

In 2006, The Arizona Republic recognized the growing pink tide, stating: "A couple of decades ago, the region, long considered part of the United States' backyard, was basking in a resurgence of democracy, sending military despots back to their barracks", further recognizing the "disfavor" with the United States and the concerns of "a wave of nationalist, leftist leaders washing across Latin America in a 'pink tide'" among United States officials. A 2007 report from the Inter Press Service news agency said how "elections results in Latin America appear to have confirmed a left-wing populist and anti-U.S. trend – the so-called 'pink tide' – which ... poses serious threats to Washington's multibillion-dollar anti-drug effort in the Andes". In 2014, Albrecht Koschützke and Hajo Lanz, directors of the Friedrich Ebert Foundation for Central America, discussed the "hope for greater social justice and a more participatory democracy" following the election of leftist leaders, though the foundation recognized that such elections "still do not mean a shift to the left", but that they are "the result of an ostensible loss of prestige from the right-wing parties that have traditionally ruled".

Writing in Americas Quarterly after the election of Pedro Castillo in 2021, Paul J. Angelo and Will Freeman warned of the risk of Latin American left-wing politicians embracing what they dubbed "regressive social values" and "leaning into traditionally conservative positions on gender equality, abortion access, LGBTQ rights, immigration, and the environment". They cited Castillo blaming Peru's femicides on male "idleness" and criticizing what he called "gender ideology" taught in Peruvian schools, as well as Ecuador, governed by left-wing leaders for almost twenty years, having one of the strictest anti-abortion laws worldwide. On immigration, they mentioned Mexico's southern border militarization to stop Central American migrant caravans and Castillo's proposal to give undocumented migrants 72 hours to leave the country after taking office, while on the environment they cited Ecuadorian progressive presidential candidate Andrés Arauz insisting on oil drilling in the Amazon, as well as the Bolivian president Luis Arce allowing agribusinesses unchecked with deforestation.

== Timeline ==
The timeline below shows periods when a left-wing or center-left leader governed a particular country.

== See also ==
- Bolivarian Alliance for the Americas
- Bolivarianism
- Bolivarian Revolution
- Chavismo
- History of Latin America
- Indigenismo
- Kirchnerism
- Latin American Boom
- Latin American drug legalization
- Latin American integration
- Latin American liberation theology
- Legacy of Che Guevara
- Left-wing populism
- Lulism
- New Left
- Nueva canción
- Pan-Americanism
- Panhispanism
- Politics of Fidel Castro
- Populism in Latin America
- Sandinista ideology
- Tankie
- The Citizens' Revolution
