= Ecuadorian Popular Revolutionary Union =

The Ecuadorian Popular Revolutionary Union (Spanish: Unión Revolucionaria Popular Ecuadoriana, URPE) was a political coalition in Ecuador, formed in 1980 by the People's Committee and the Second Independence Movement. The two organizations constituting URPE had previously belonged to the Broad Left Front (FADI).
