= The Citizens' Revolution =

2007–2017 Ecuadorian government project

The Citizens' Revolution (Spanish: La Revolución Ciudadana) was a political and socioeconomic project formulated by a coalition of left-wing politicians with a variety of social organizations in Ecuador. Through the implementation of the Citizens' Revolution, President Rafael Correa, who was the leader of PAIS Alliance, has sought since 2008 to gradually achieve the socialist reconstruction of Ecuadorian society.

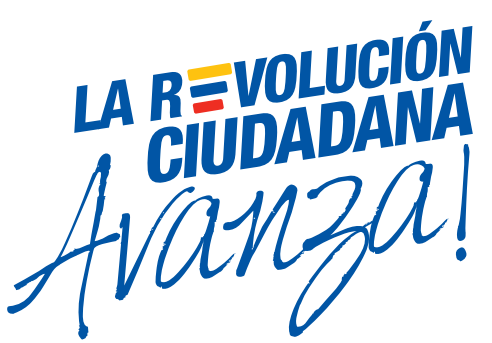
Logo of The Citizens' Revolution used from 2011 to 2012 by the PAIS government

== Origins ==
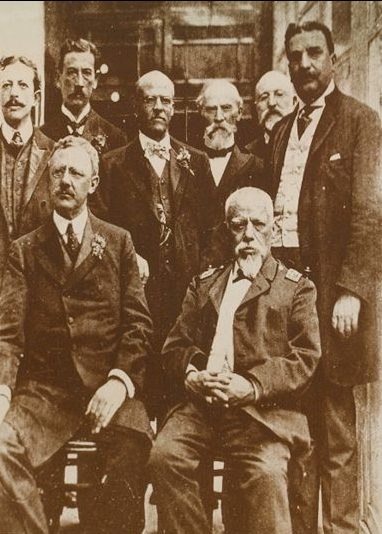
1908: first row, Archer Harman and Eloy Alfaro; second: Alfredo Monge, Crnel. Belisario Torres, Dr. César Borja Lavayen, Gral. Francisco Hipólito Moncayo, William Fox and Amalio Puga

The foundation of the Citizens' Revolution is the Liberal Revolution of 1895 led by Eloy Alfaro (1842–1912) and the ideals of Socialism of the 21st century.

== Basis ==
The Citizens' Revolution was based on the Five Axes of the Citizens' Revolution (Los 5 ejes de la Revolución Ciudadana).

The Five Axes underpin the 2009–2013 National Plan for Good Living which "establishes new horizons aimed to materialize and radicalize the project for a change of the Citizens' Revolution for the construction of a Plurinational and Intercultural State and, finally, for the achievement of Good Living for all Ecuadorians."

Ecuador decided to end its credit relationship with the International Monetary Fund and renegotiated oil contracts and rejoined OPEC. Ecuador was also active in the project to integrate the countries of South America into a single economic and political bloc in UNASUR, the Union of South American Nations and was instrumental in the creation of the Bank of the South (El Banco del Sur) a pan-South American monetary fund, development bank and lending organisation whose founding agreement was signed on 26 September 2009. Following the rightward turn of the Alianza PAIS, allies of Correa founded a new leftist party named for the philosophy, the Citizen Revolution Movement.

== See also ==
- Bolivarian Revolution
- Pink tide
