= Fander Falconí =

Ecuadorian economist and politician

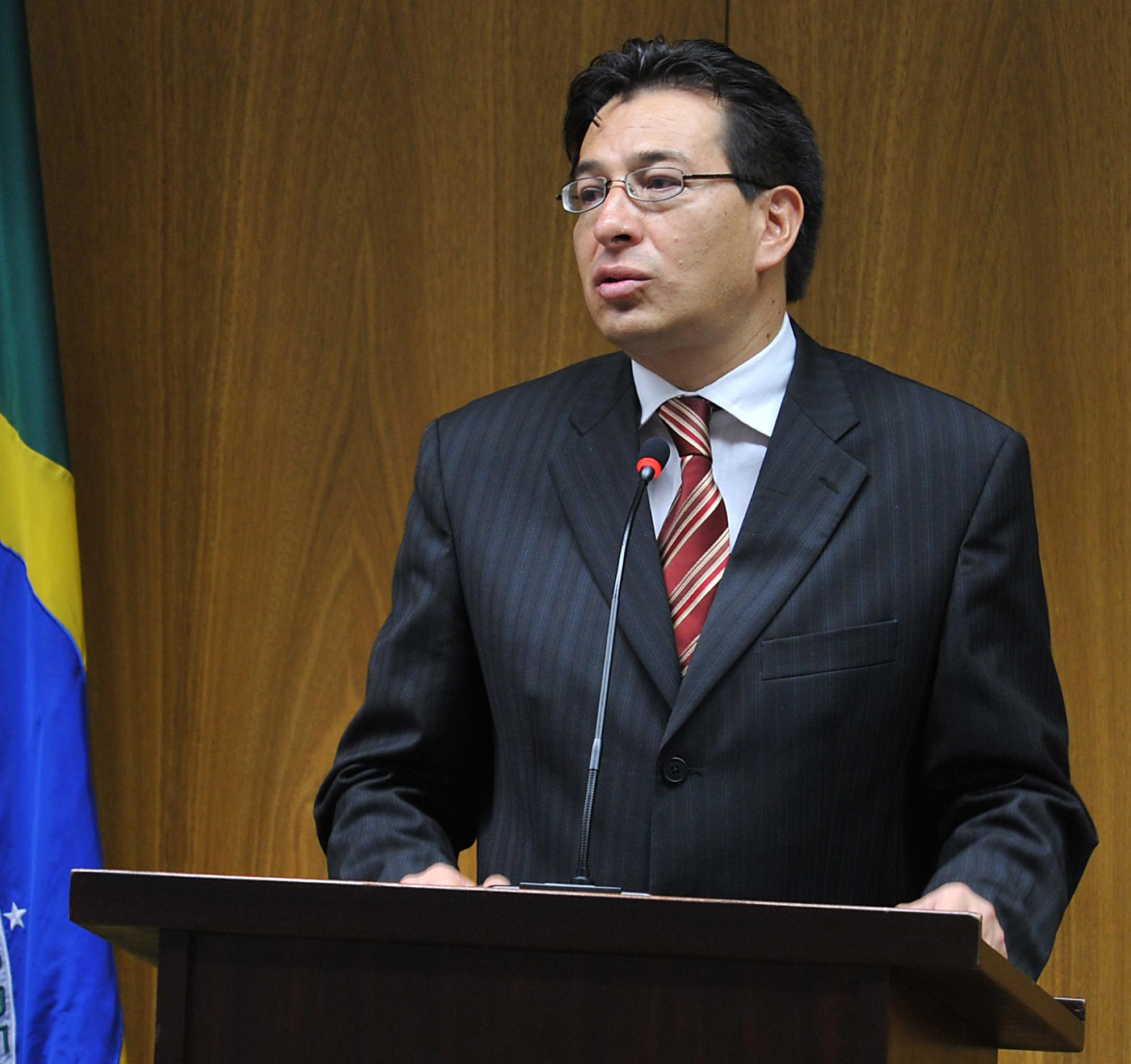
Fander Falconí Benitez

Fander Falconí Benitez (born 19 September 1962), is an Ecuadorian economist and politician. He served as Foreign Minister (known in Ecuador as "Chancellor") in the government of President Rafael Correa from December 2008 until his resignation on 13 January 2010 because of the Yasuní oil project.

On 23 May 2017, he was named Minister of Education in the cabinet of Lenín Moreno.

He studied Economics in Pontificia Universidad Católica del Ecuador.
