= Socialism of the 21st century =

Interpretation of socialist principles

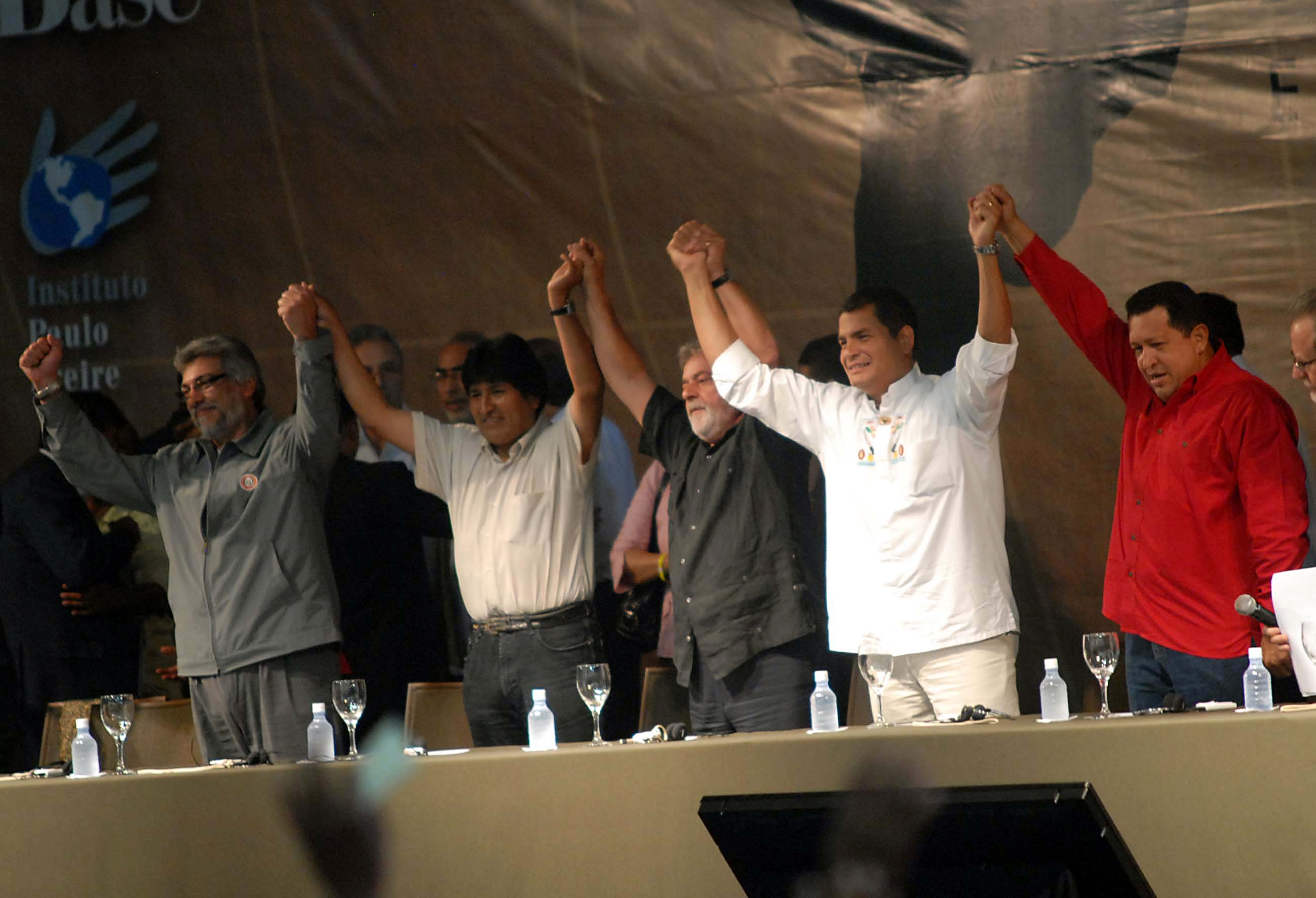
Fernando Lugo (President of Paraguay), Evo Morales (President of Bolivia), Lula da Silva (President of Brazil), Rafael Correa (President of Ecuador) and Hugo Chávez (President of Venezuela) on 29 January 2009

Socialism of the 21st century is an interpretation of socialist principles first advocated by German sociologist and political analyst Heinz Dieterich and taken up by a number of Latin American leaders. Dieterich argued in 1996 that free-market and industrial capitalism and Marxism–Leninism have failed to solve urgent problems of humanity such as poverty, hunger, exploitation of labour, economic oppression, sexism, racism, the destruction of natural resources and the absence of true democracy. Socialism of the 21st century has democratic socialist elements but also resembles Marxist revisionism.

Leaders who have advocated for this form of socialism include Hugo Chávez of Venezuela, Rafael Correa of Ecuador, Evo Morales of Bolivia, Néstor Kirchner and Cristina Fernández de Kirchner of Argentina, Luiz Inácio Lula da Silva of Brazil and Michelle Bachelet of Chile. Because of the local unique historical conditions, socialism of the 21st century is often contrasted with previous applications of socialism in other countries, with a major difference being the effort towards a more effective economic planning process. Outside Latin America, socialism of the 21st century has been promoted by left-wing leaders such as Mark Drakeford and Jeremy Corbyn in the United Kingdom and Lothar Bisky, Egon Krenz and Oskar Lafontaine in Germany, and also by parties such as the Communist Party of Spain and United Left in Spain and the Communist Party of the Russian Federation and Just Russia.

== Historical foundations ==
After a series of structural adjustment loans and debt restructuring led by the International Monetary Fund in the late 20th century, Latin America experienced a significant increase in inequality. Between 1990 and 1999, the Gini coefficient, a measure of inequality in the income or wealth distribution, rose in almost every Latin American country. Volatile prices and inflation led to dissatisfaction. In 2000, only 37% of Latin Americans were satisfied with their democracies (20 points less than Europeans and 10 points less than sub-Saharan Africans). In this context, a wave of left-leaning socio-political movements, called the Pink tide, on behalf of indigenous rights, cocaleros, labor rights, women's rights, land rights and educational reform emerged to eventually provide momentum for the election of socialist leaders. Socialism of the 21st century draws on indigenous traditions of communal governance and previous Latin America socialist and communist movements, including those of Salvador Allende, Fidel Castro, Che Guevara and the Sandinista National Liberation Front.

== Theoretical tenets ==
According to Dieterich, this form of socialism is revolutionary in that the existing society is altered to be qualitatively different, but the process itself should be gradual and non-violent, instead utilising democracy to secure power, education, scientific knowledge about society and international cooperation. Dieterich suggests the construction of four basic institutions within the new reality of post-capitalist civilisation:

1. Equivalent economy based on the Marxian economic labor theory of value and democratically determined by those who directly create value instead of principles of market economies.
2. Majority democracy which makes use of referendums to decide upon important societal questions.
3. Basic state democracy with a suitable protection of minority rights.
4. Citizens who are responsible, rational and self-determined.

== Post-neoliberalism ==
Post-neoliberalism, also known as anti-neoliberalism, is a set of ideals characterized by its rejection of neoliberalism and the economic policies embodied by the Washington Consensus. While there is scholarly debate about the defining features of post-neoliberalism, it is often associated with economic progressivism as a response to neoliberalism's perceived excesses or failures, ranging from nationalization and wealth redistribution to embracing protectionism and revival of trade unions; it can also refer to left-wing politics more generally.

The movement has had particular influence in Latin America, where the pink tide brought about a substantial shift towards left-wing governments in the 2000s. Examples of post-neoliberal governments include the former governments of Evo Morales in Bolivia and Rafael Correa in Ecuador. It has also been claimed by some analysts that the Joe Biden administration in the United States exhibited post-neoliberal characteristics.

=== History ===
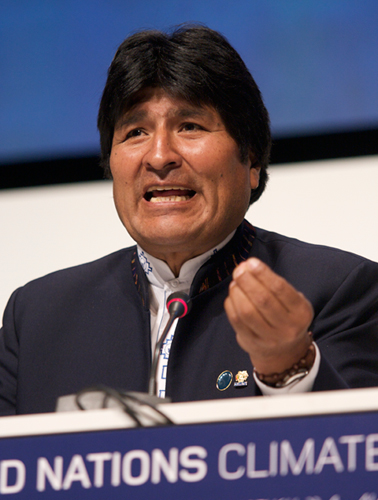
Evo Morales, the former president of Bolivia, is often associated with post-neoliberalism.

The idea of post-neoliberalism arose during the pink tide of the 1990s and 2000s, in which left-wing Latin American critics of neoliberalism like Hugo Chávez and Evo Morales were thrust into power. According to researchers, the election of Chávez as the president of Venezuela in 1999 marked a definite start to the pink tide and post-neoliberal movement. Following his election, Rafael Correa, Néstor Kirchner, Evo Morales, and numerous other leaders associated with the post-neoliberal movement were elected in Latin America during the 2000s and 2010s. Into the 2020s, the Chilean president-elect Gabriel Boric, who emerged victorious in the 2021 Chilean general election, pledged to end the country's neoliberal economic model, stating: "If Chile was the cradle of neoliberalism, it will also be its grave."

While the ideas of post-neoliberalism are not exclusive to Latin America, they are largely associated with the region. Post-neoliberalism has drawn criticism from the right of the political spectrum; right-wing and far-right critics have claimed that the term itself is vague and populistic, while also arguing that "post-neoliberal" policies harm international investment and economic development.

=== Ideology ===
Post-neoliberalism seeks to fundamentally change the role of the state in countries where the Washington Consensus once prevailed. To achieve this, post-neoliberal leaders in Latin America have advocated for the nationalization of several industries, notably the gas, mining, and oil industries. Post-neoliberalism also advocates for the expansion of welfare benefits, greater governmental investment in poverty reduction, and increased state intervention in the economy.

== Latin American application ==
=== Regional integration ===
The model of socialism of the 21st century encourages economic and political integration among nations in Latin America and the Caribbean. This is often accompanied with opposition to North American influence. Regional organizations like ALBA and CELAC promote cooperation with Latin America and exclude North American countries. ALBA is most explicitly related to socialism of the 21st century while other organizations focus on economic integration, ALBA promotes social, political and economic integration among countries that subscribe to democratic socialism. Its creation was announced in direct opposition to George W. Bush's attempts to establish a Free Trade Area of the Americas that included the United States. In 2008, ALBA introduced a monetary union using the SUCRE as its regional currency.

=== Bolivarian process ===
Former Venezuelan President Hugo Chávez initiated a process of social reforms in Venezuela known as the Bolivarian Revolution. This approach was more heavily influenced by the theories of István Mészáros, Michael Lebowitz and Marta Harnecker (who was Chávez's adviser between 2004 and 2011) than by those of Heinz Dieterich. The process draws its name from Latin American liberator Simón Bolívar and is a contemporary example of Bolivarianism.

=== Buen vivir ===
Often translated to good living or living well, the concept of buen vivir is related to the movement for indigenous rights and rights of nature. It focuses on living sustainably as the member of a community that includes both human beings and Nature. Buen vivir is enshrined in 2008 Constitution of Ecuador as an alternative to neoliberal development. The constitution outlines a set of rights, one of which is the rights of nature. In line with the assertion of these rights, buen vivir seeks to change the relationship between nature and humans to a more bio-pluralistic view, eliminating the separation between nature and society. This approach has been applied to the Yasuní-ITT Initiative. Buen vivir is sometimes conceptualised as collaborative consumption in a sharing economy and the term is used to look at the world in way sharply differentiated from natural, social or human capital.

== Criticism ==
=== Authoritarianism ===
Critics claim that socialism of the 21st century in Latin America acts as a façade for authoritarianism. The charisma of figures like Hugo Chávez and mottoes like "Country, Socialism, or Death!" have drawn comparisons to the Latin American dictators and caudillos of the past. According to Steven Levitsky of Harvard University, "Only under the dictatorships of the past ... were presidents reelected for life", with Levitsky further stating that while Latin America experienced democracy, citizens opposed "indefinite reelection, because of the dictatorships of the past". Levitsky then observed: "In Nicaragua, Venezuela and Ecuador, reelection is associated with the same problems of 100 years ago." The Washington Post also stated in 2014 that "Bolivia's Evo Morales, Daniel Ortega of Nicaragua and the late Venezuelan president Hugo Chávez ... used the ballot box to weaken or eliminate term limits."

In 2015, The Economist stated that the Bolivarian Revolution in Venezuela—now under Nicolás Maduro after Chávez's death in 2013—was devolving from authoritarianism to dictatorship as opposition politicians were jailed for plotting to undermine the government, violence was widespread and opposition media shut down. Western media coverage of Chávez and other Latin American leaders from the 21st-century socialist movement has been criticised as unfair by their supporters and leftist media critics.

=== Economics ===
The sustainability and stability of economic reforms associated with governments adhering to socialism of the 21st century have been questioned. Latin American countries have primarily financed their social programs with extractive exports like petroleum, natural gas and minerals, creating a dependency that some economists claim has caused inflation and slowed growth. For the Bolivarian government of Venezuela, their economic policies led to shortages in Venezuela, a high inflation rate and a dysfunctional economy. However, the economic policy of the Hugo Chávez administration and Maduro governments have attributed Venezuela's economic problems to the decline in oil prices, sanctions imposed by the United States and economic sabotage by the opposition. In 2015, Venezuela's economy was performing poorly—the currency had collapsed, it had the world's highest inflation rate and its gross domestic product shrank into an economic collapse in 2016.

=== Populism ===
Although democratic socialist intellectuals have welcomed a socialism of the 21st century, some have been skeptical of Latin America's examples. While citing their progressive role, they argue that the appropriate label for these governments is populist rather than socialist. Similarly, some of the left-wing pink tide governments were criticised for turning from socialism to authoritarianism and populism.

== List of anti-neoliberal or post-neoliberal political parties ==
"If Chile was the cradle of neoliberalism, it will also be its grave."

— Gabriel Boric, 20 December 2021

South America:

- Argentina: Union for the Homeland, Frente de Todos, Front for Victory, Patria Grande Front
- Bolivia: Movement for Socialism
- Chile: Social Convergence
- Ecuador: Citizen Revolution Movement, PAIS Alliance under Rafael Correa
- Uruguay: Broad Front
- Venezuela: Fifth Republic Movement, Great Patriotic Pole, United Socialist Party of Venezuela, under Hugo Chávez, Communist Party of Venezuela

North America:

- Canada: Québec Solidaire, Green Party of Quebec
- Mexico: Morena
- Honduras: Liberty and Refoundation

Asia

- Japan: Social Democratic Party
- Philippines: Partido Lakas ng Masa
- South Korea: Progressive Party
- Sri Lanka: National People's Power
- Turkey: Communist Party of Turkey, Patriotic Party, Labour and Freedom Alliance

Europe

- France: New Anticapitalist Party
- Iceland: Socialist Party of Iceland
- Ireland: Independents 4 Change
- Italy: Power to the People
- Norway: Red Party

Oceania

- Australia: Australian Greens

== See also ==
- Anti-capitalism
- Kirchnerism
- Millennial socialism
- Pink tide
- Post-capitalism
- Post-Marxism
- Project Cybersyn
