= Eduardo Santos Alvite =

Ecuadorian economist and retired diplomat

Ecuadorian Ambassador to Uruguay
- In office 1980–1982
- Preceded by: 1947 to 1952: Leopoldo Benites; 1964: José Rumazo González
- Succeeded by: 2010-2016: Emilio Rafael Izquierdo Miño

Ecuadorian Ambassador to Cuba
- In office 1984–1984
- Preceded by: Jorge Pérez Concha
- Succeeded by: María Augusta Calle

Ecuadorian Ambassador to Russia
- In office 1988–1990
- Preceded by: April 20, 1973 Embajador del Ecuador en la Unión Soviética Jorge Icaza Coronel
- Succeeded by: December 11, 2007: Patricio Alberto Chávez Závala; Julio César Prado Espinosa

Ecuadorian Ambassador to the United Nations Office at Geneva
- In office 1990–1995
- Preceded by: José Ricardo Martinez Cobo
- Succeeded by: Luis Gallegos

Personal details
- Born: 13 March 1940 Quito
- Spouse: Nellie Del Carmen Repetto Heredia María Eugenia Sandoval
- Relations: brother of Fernando Santos Alvite: 1987 under secretary of natural resources, 1988 Energy and Mines Minister Ecuador
- Children: Carlos Eduardo Santos Repetto Alejandro Santos Repetto Verónica Santos Repetto Nelly Santos Repetto Santiago Santos Repetto Lorena Santos Repetto
- Relatives: Santos family
- Education: Graduate in Economic, Spoken languages: Spanish, English
- Alma mater: Autonomous University of Mexico
- Profession: Economist
- Known for: Academic books

Eduardo Santos Alvite is Ecuadorian economist and retired diplomat.

== Career ==
He joined the Ecuadorian Ministry for Foreign Affairs. From 1976 to 1979 he was director of the National Board of Planification and Coordination. From 1979 to 1981 he was Under Secretary of Economic Affairs, Ministry of Foreign Affairs.

From 1980 to 1982 he was ambassador in Montevideo and Permanent representative to the Latin American Integration Association

In 1984 he was Coordinator of the Economic Conference of Latin America in Ecuador and ambassador in Habana. From 1988 to 1990 he was ambassador in Moscow (Soviet Union). From 1990 to 1995 he was Ecuador's Permanent Representative next to the United Nations Office at Geneva.

== Publications ==
- with Mariana Mora Duque: Ecuador: La Ecuador since 1930.
- Ecuador en la década de los noventa, principales desafíos, Corporación Editora Nacional, 1993 - 86 p
- El Ecuador al año 2000: sector agropecuario, forestal y pesquero, Quito, Corporación Editora Nacional/Conacyt, 1989, p.
- "La Pobreza en el Ecuador", del Econ. Eduardo Santos Alvite, 1993
- Crimen contra el pulmón del mundo (THE CRIME AGAINST THE LUNG OF THE WORLD, THE AMAZON),
