= Latin America–United States relations =

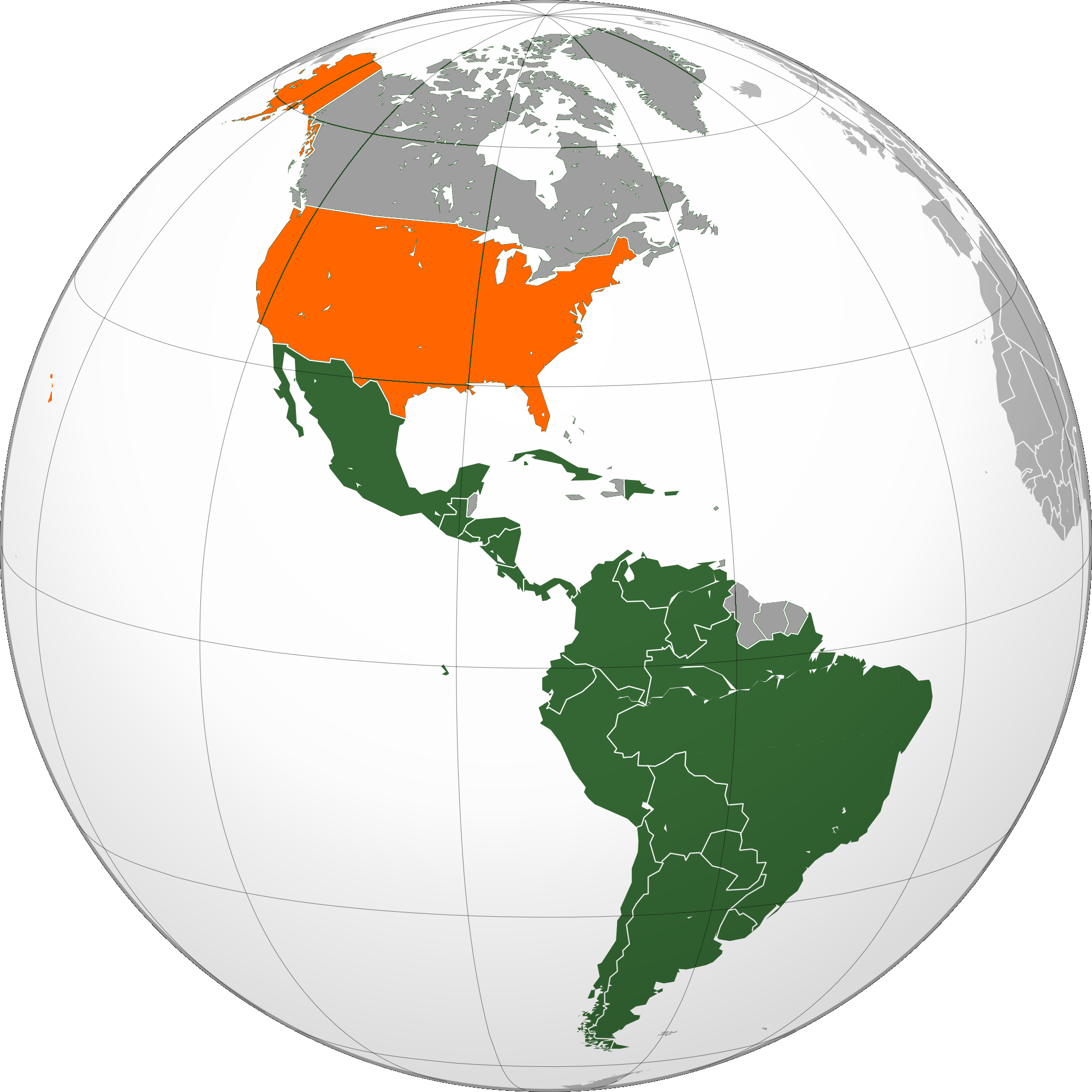

- Latin America: United States

Bilateral relations between the various countries of Latin America and the United States of America have been multifaceted and complex, at times defined by strong regional cooperation and at others filled with economic and political tension and rivalry. Although relations between the U.S. government and most of Latin America were limited prior to the late 1800s, for most of the past century, the United States has unofficially regarded parts of Latin America as within its sphere of influence, and for much of the Cold War (1947–1991), vied with the Soviet Union.

The political context evolved again in the 2000s, with the election in several South American countries of socialist governments. This "pink tide" thus saw the successive elections of Hugo Chávez in Venezuela (1998), Lula in Brazil (2002), Néstor Kirchner in Argentina (2003), Tabaré Vázquez in Uruguay (2004), Evo Morales in Bolivia (2005), Michelle Bachelet in Chile (2006), Daniel Ortega in Nicaragua (2006), Rafael Correa in Ecuador (2006), Fernando Lugo in Paraguay (2008), José Mujica in Uruguay (2009), Ollanta Humala in Peru (2011), Luis Guillermo Solís in Costa Rica (2014), Salvador Sánchez Cerén in El Salvador (2014), and Andrés Manuel López Obrador in Mexico (2018). Although these leaders vary in their policies and attitude towards both Washington, D.C. and neoliberalism, while the states they govern also have different agendas and long-term historic tendencies, which can lead to rivalry and open contempt between themselves, they seem to have agreed on refusing the ALCA and on following a regional integration without the United States' overseeing the process. In particular, Chávez and Morales seem more disposed to ally together, while Kirchner and Lula, who has been criticized by the left-wing in Brazil, including by the Movimento dos Sem Terra (MST) landless peasants movement (who, however, did call to vote for him on his second term), are seen as more centered. The state of Bolivia also has seen some friction with Brazil, as well as Chile. Nouriel Roubini, professor of economics at New York University, said in a May 2006 interview: "On one side, you have a number of administrations that are committed to moderate economic reform. On the other, you've had something of a backlash against the Washington Consensus [a set of liberal economic policies that Washington-based institutions urged Latin American countries to follow, including privatization, trade liberalization and fiscal discipline] and some emergence of populist leaders." In the same way, although a leader such as Chávez verbally attacked the George W. Bush administration as much as the latter attacked him, and claimed to be following a democratic socialist Bolivarian Revolution, the geo-political context has changed a lot since the 1970s. Larry Birns, director of the Council on Hemispheric Affairs, thus stated: for influence in the Western Hemisphere.

Today, the ties between the United States and most of Latin America are generally cordial, but there remain areas of tension between the two sides. Latin America is the largest foreign supplier of oil to the United States and its fastest-growing trading partner, as well as the largest source of illegal drugs and immigration, both documented and otherwise, all of which underline the continually evolving relationship between the region and country.

== Overview ==
=== Early history ===
Until the end of the 19th century, the US only had a especially close relationship primarily with nearby Mexico and Cuba (apart from Central America, Mexico and the Spanish colony of Cuba), which was largely economically tied to Britain. The United States had no involvement in the process by which Spanish colonies broke away and became independent around 1820. In cooperation with, and help from Britain, the United States issued the Monroe Doctrine in 1823, warning against the establishment of any additional European colonies in Latin America.

Texas, which had been settled by colonies of Americans, fought a successful war for independence from Mexico in 1836. Mexico refused to recognize the independence and warned that annexation to the United States meant war. Annexation came in 1845 and the Mexican–American War began in 1846. The American military was easily triumphant. The result was the Mexican Cession of Santa Fe de Nuevo México and Alta California. About 60,000 Mexicans remained in the territories and became US citizens. France took advantage of the American Civil War (1861–1865) to take over Mexico during the Second French Intervention. Due to defeats in Europe, France pulled out troops, leaving the Imperialists and Maximilian I of Mexico to face defeat from the Benito Juarez-led Republicans (backed by the US).

=== Rise in American influence ===
The Anglo-Venezuelan boundary dispute in 1895 asserted for the first time a more outward-looking American foreign policy, particularly in the Americas, marking the United States as a world power. This was the earliest example of modern interventionism under the Monroe Doctrine. By the late nineteenth century the rapid economic growth of the United States increasingly troubled Latin America. A Pan-American Union was created under American aegis, but it had little impact as did its successor the Organization of American States.

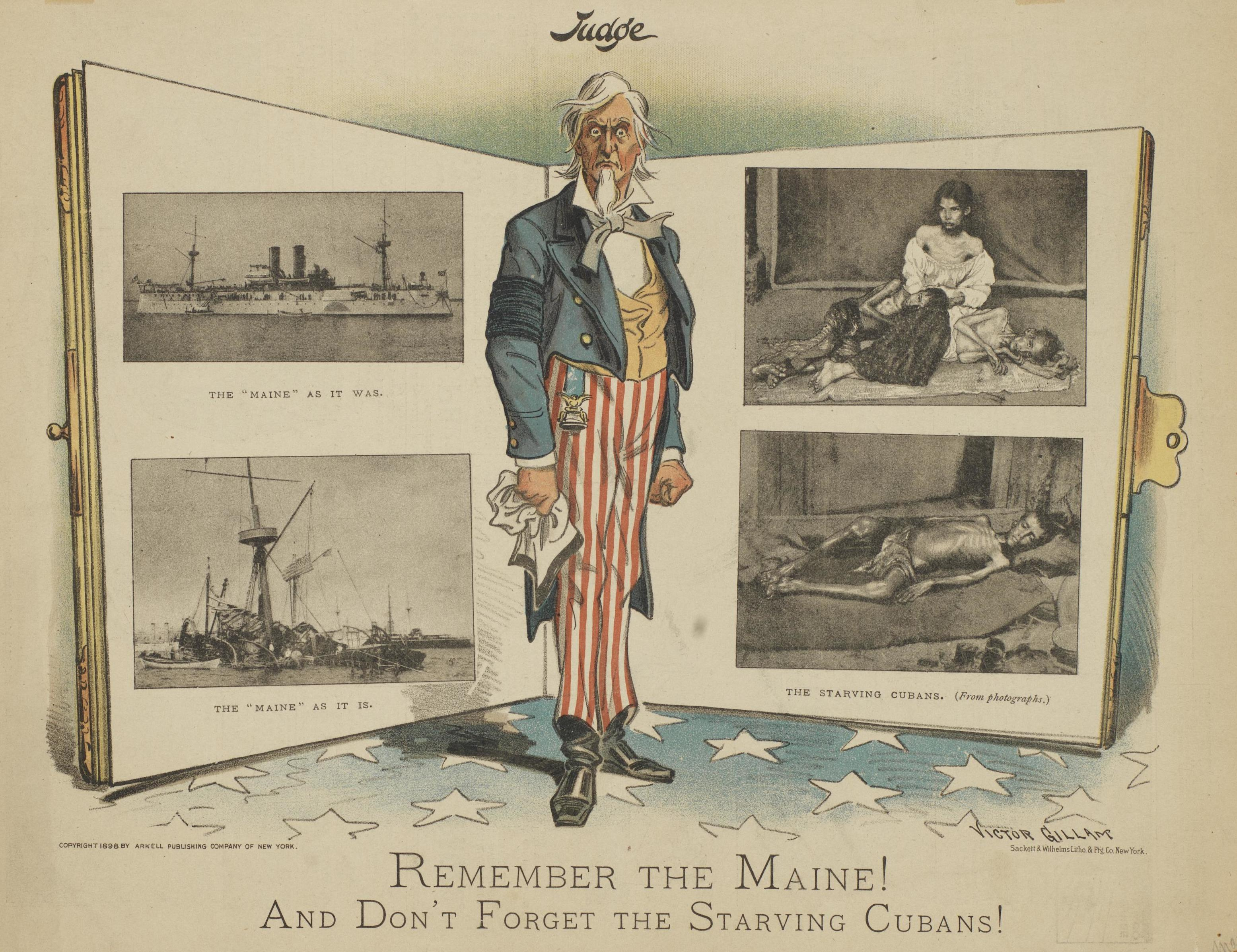
American cartoon, published in 1898: "Remember the Maine! And Don't Forget the Starving Cubans!"

As unrest in Cuba escalated in the 1890s, the United States demanded reforms that Spain was unable to accomplish. The result was the Spanish–American War of 1898, in which United States acquired Puerto Rico and set up a protectorate over Cuba under the Platt Amendment rule passed as part of the 1901 Army Appropriations Bill. The building of the Panama Canal absorbed American attention from 1903. The US facilitated a revolt that made Panama independent from Colombia and set up the Panama Canal Zone as an American owned and operated district that was finally returned to Panama in 1979. The Canal opened in 1914 and proved a major factor in world trade. The United States paid special attention to protection of the military approaches to the Panama Canal, including threats by Germany. Repeatedly it seized temporary control of the finances of several countries, especially Haiti and Nicaragua.

The Mexican Revolution started in 1910; it alarmed American business interests that had invested in Mexican mines and railways. The United States involvement in the Mexican Revolution, include, among other violations of sovereignty, the ambassadorial backing of a coup and assassination of President Francisco I. Madero and the military occupation of Veracruz. Large numbers of Mexicans fled the war-torn revolution into the southwestern United States. Meanwhile, the United States increasingly replaced Britain as the major trade partner and financier throughout Latin America. The US adopted a "Good Neighbor Policy" in the 1930s, which meant friendly trade relations would continue regardless of political conditions or dictatorships. This policy responded to longstanding Latin American diplomatic pressure for a regional declaration of nonintervention, as well as the increasing resistance and cost of US occupations in Central America and the Caribbean. One effect of the two world wars was a reduction in European presence in Latin America and an increasing solidification of the US position. "The proclamation of the Monroe Doctrine that the hemisphere was closed to European powers, which was presumptuous in 1823, had become effective by the eve of the World War I, at least in terms of military alliances," Friedman and Long note. United States signed up the major countries as allies against Germany and Japan in World War II. However, some countries like Argentina, Chile, Ecuador, Paraguay, Uruguay and Venezuela only declared war on Axis powers in 1945 (though most had broken relations previously).

=== Cold War ===
The era of the Good Neighbor Policy ended with the ramp-up of the Cold War in 1945, as the United States felt there was a greater need to protect the western hemisphere from Soviet Union influence and a potential rise of communism. These changes conflicted with the Good Neighbor Policy's fundamental principle of non-intervention and led to a new wave of US involvement in Latin American affairs. "In the 1950s, the United States shifted from an earlier tradition of direct military intervention to covert and proxy interventions in the cases:

Guatemala (1954), Cuba (1961), Guyana (1961–1964), Chile (1970–1973), and Nicaragua (1981–1990), as well as outright military invasions of the Dominican Republic (1965), Grenada (1983), and Panama (1989)."

Furthermore, during the 1970s, the Nixon Administration would exercise immense economic and political pressure. Henry Kissinger, Nixon's Secretary of State, spearheaded the administration's relations in the region and crafted the very circumstances necessary for pro-American leaders to take over. The first decade of the Cold War saw relative high degrees of consensus between US and Latin American elites, centered on anti-communism, though with divergences over the direction of economic policy. Later decades of the Cold War saw higher levels of violence in conflicts with overlapping local, US-Latin American, and global Cold War dimensions, referred to by historian Tanya Harmer as the "inter-American Cold War." The turn of Castro's revolution in Cuba after 1959 toward Soviet communism alienated Cuba from the United States, though reactions to the revolution varied considerably across Latin America. An attempted invasion failed and at the peak of the Cold War in 1962, the Cuban Missile Crisis threatened major war as the Soviet Union installed nuclear weapons in Cuba to defend it from an American invasion. The crisis also shook the domestic politics of Latin American countries, where governments initially exhibited little sympathy for Cuba. There was no invasion, but the United States imposed an economic boycott on Cuba that remains in effect, as well as a breaking off of diplomatic relations, that lasted until 2015. The US also saw the rise of left-wing governments in central America as a threat and, in some cases, overthrew democratically elected governments perceived at the time as becoming left-wing or unfriendly to U.S. interests. Examples include the 1954 Guatemalan coup d'état, the 1964 Brazilian coup d'état, the 1973 Chilean coup d'état and the support of the Contra rebels in Nicaragua. After 1960, Latin America increasingly supplied illegal drugs, especially marijuana and cocaine to the rich American market. One consequence was the growth of violent drug gangs in Mexico and other parts of Central America attempting to control the drug supply. The United States would often back anybody they say as an ally in the fight against communism, including dictatorships such as the Somoza regime in Nicaragua. The Somoza regime would be overthrown in 1979 by the Sandinista Nation Liberation Front, which was a left-wing group that was backed by Cuba and other socialist countries. This along with dozens of other battles between political groups in Latin America only added more tension and division to Latin America's Cold War. As the United States struggled through Vietnam and through the oil shocks, Latin American countries took notice. Many countries, like Venezuela, saw these moments as a chance to space some of the firm grasp the US had put on Latin America and begin to get more from the table. Countries were able to broker new deals that allowed them to grow massively economically, Venezuela became a major supplier of the world's oil, but most importantly, Latin American countries no longer felt like they had to pick between the US and the USSR, but rather be sovereign.

By the 1980s, the Ronald Reagan administration engaged in the fight to stop the spread of communism in Latin America. Reagan believed that democratization and economic liberalization were two sides of the same coin. There was a "vital nexus between economic and political freedom" and that "these democratic and free-market revolutions are really the same revolution." Reagan also added that this deep ideological commitment to democracy was "not cultural imperialism" but rather "the means for genuing self-determination and protection for diversity."

=== Post-Cold War era ===
In the 1970s and 1980s, the United States gave strong support to violent anti-Communist forces in Latin America. The fall of Soviet Communism in 1989–92 largely ended the communist threat. The North American Free Trade Agreement (NAFTA) took effect in 1994 and dramatically increased the volume of trade among Mexico, the United States and Canada. In the Post-Cold War period, Pastor and Long noted, "democracy and free trade seemed to have consolidated, and it looked as though the United States had found an exit from the whirlpool. But as the first decade of this century concludes, that prediction seems premature. Democracy is again endangered, free trade has stalled and threatens to go into reverse, and the exit from the whirlpool is not as clearly marked."

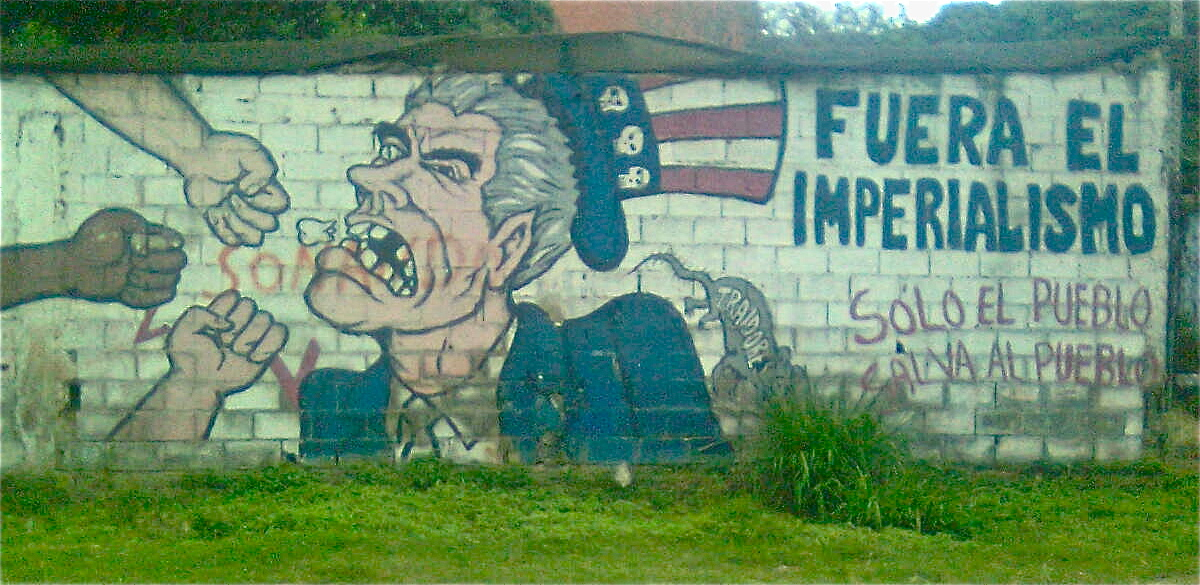
Street art in Venezuela, depicting Uncle Sam and accusing the U.S. government of imperialism

In the early 21st century, several left-wing parties gained power through elections in Latin America during a period known as the pink tide. Venezuela under the late Hugo Chávez and his successor Nicolás Maduro has been particularly critical of U.S. foreign policy; Nicaragua, Bolivia, and Ecuador currently have governments sometimes seen as aligned with Venezuela, while Cuba and the U.S. continue to have non-existent relations. Left-wing governments in nations such as Brazil, Peru, Paraguay, Argentina, and Uruguay during this period were considerably more centrist and neutral.

During this period, the center-right governments in Argentina, Mexico, Panama, Chile, and Colombia pursued closer relations with the U.S., with Mexico being the U.S.'s largest economic partner in Latin America and its third largest overall trade partner after Canada and China. Through the North American Free Trade Agreement (NAFTA) signed with Canada and Mexico in 1994, the United States enjoys virtual duty-free trade with Mexico. Since 1994, the United States has signed other notable free-trade agreements with Chile in 2004, Peru in 2007, and most recently Colombia and Panama in 2011. By 2015, relations were tense between United States and Venezuela.

Large-scale immigration from Latin America to the United States grew since the late 20th century. Today approximately 18% of the U.S. population is Latino Americans, totaling more than 50 million people, mostly of Mexican and Central American background. Furthermore, over 10 million illegal immigrants live in the United States, most of them with Latino origins. Many send money back home to family members and contribute considerably to the domestic economies of their countries of origin. Large-scale immigration to the United States came primarily from Mexico. Smaller, though still significant, immigrant populations from Cuba, El Salvador, the Dominican Republic, Guatemala and Colombia exist in the United States.

Most of Latin America is still part of the Organization of American States, and remains bound by the Inter-American Treaty of Reciprocal Assistance also known as the Rio Pact, which provides for hemispheric defense, with the exceptions of Bolivia, Cuba, Ecuador, Nicaragua, Mexico and Venezuela, all of which withdrew from the Treaty during the past decade.

In addition, Argentina is a major non-NATO ally of the United States, the result of a policy of reapproachment and market liberalization led by President Carlos Menem during the 1990s which saw the country send troops as part of the coalition in the Gulf War and become one of the world's largest contributors to UN peacekeeping operations. After a period of worsening relations during the late 2000s administration of Cristina Kirchner, the election of centre-right President Mauricio Macri has resulted in renewed interest in both countries to continue improving trade and bilateral relations.

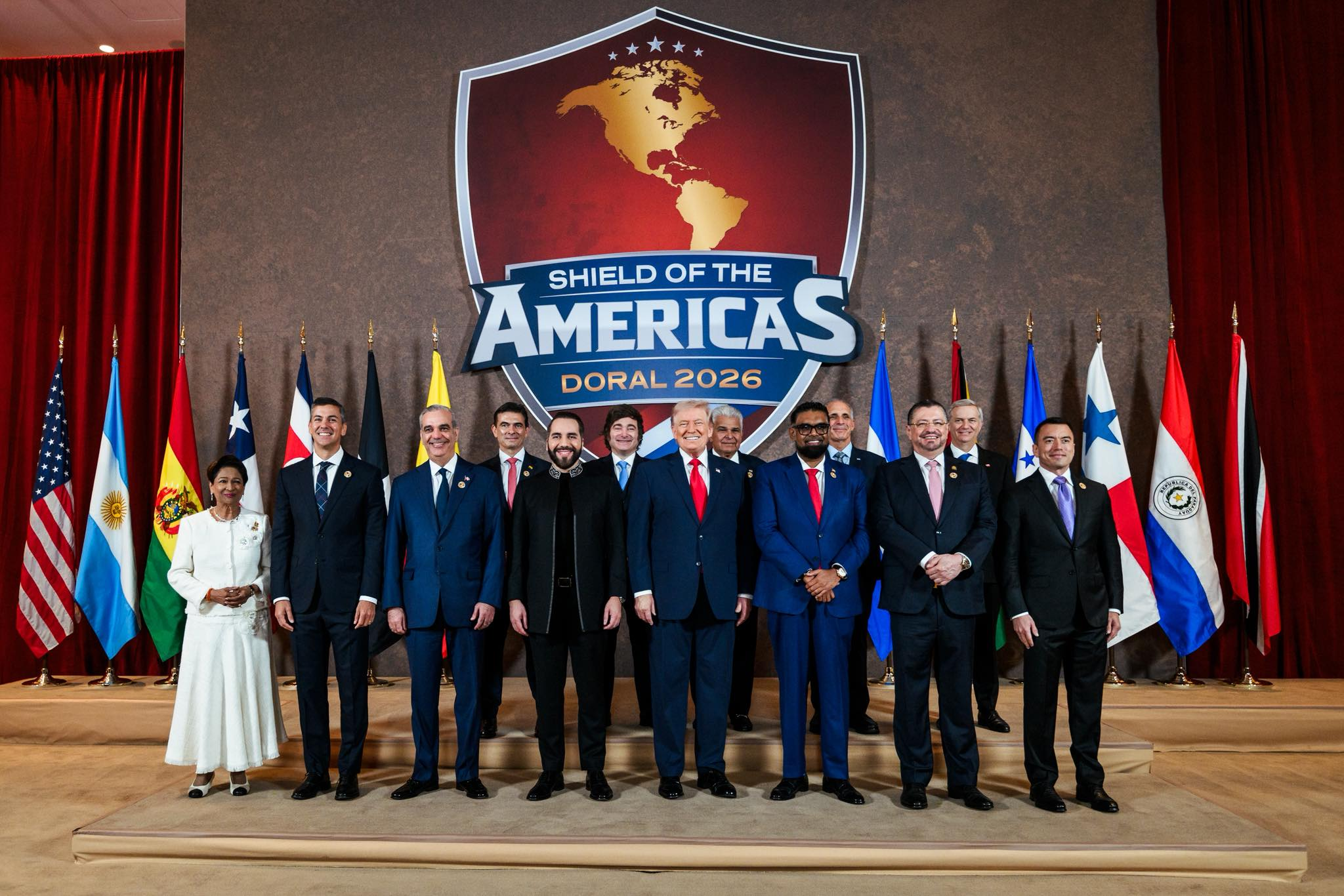
President Trump meets with various Latin American leaders in the Shield of the Americas Summit

In May 2025, after US president Donald Trump's imposition of high tariffs, respondents in every Latin American country surveyed except Argentina support doing more trade with Beijing than with the United States, according to the monthly LatAm Pulse survey conducted by AtlasIntel for Bloomberg News.

Despite these tariffs put by the second Trump administration, the 2020s would see the political right has achieved significant electoral victories in many Latin American countries. Right-wing presidential candidates were elected in Argentina 2023, El Salvador 2024, Panama 2024, Ecuador 2025, Bolivia 2025, Honduras 2025, Chile 2025, Costa Rica 2026, Peru 2026, and Colombia 2026. The right-wing governments that have come to power in these countries have consistently strengthened their ties with the United States and the Trump administration.

== Cultural relations ==
=== Sports ===
American influences brought baseball to Latin America and the Caribbean in the late 19th century, and it is now one of the most popular sports in the region. At the turn of the 21st century, the Latin American diaspora in the United States played a major role in growing American soccer.

== Academic research ==
In a review of 341 published academic books and articles on US-Latin America relations, Bertucci noted that the subject appears and combined a number of academic disciplines, including history, political science, international relations, and economics. Descriptive and normative research is prevalent, and that in works published through 2008, explicit theory-building and hypothesis-testing was limited. That work reviewed showed a prevalence of foreign policy analysis, especially of US foreign policy, with more limited attention to non-state actors and multilateralism. In her study of International Relations as studied and taught within Latin America, Tickner notes that US IR sources remain dominant in the teaching of IR, but that in research, these theories are commonly adapted and reinterpreted in a "Latin American hybrid." She notes the presence of original concepts and emphases; some of these emerge from dependency theory and explore autonomy and international insertion.

There are two broad schools of thought on Latin America–United States relations:

- The "establishment" school which sees US policy towards Latin America as an attempt to exclude extraterritorial rivals from the hemisphere as a way to defend the United States. This grouping of scholars generally sees the US presence in Latin America as beneficial for the region, as it has made warfare rare, led to the creation of multilateral institutions in the region and promoted democracy.
- The "revisionist synthesis" school of scholarship that emerged during the 1980s and 1990s and saw US policy towards Latin America as imperial. This grouping of scholars emphasizes the role of US business and government elites in shaping a foreign policy to economically dominate Latin America. More recently, scholars have expanded the use of Latin American archives and sources, providing greater attention to Latin American agency. Previously, empirical knowledge about Latin American policymaking had been limited by uneven access to archives in the region, which has generally improved in recent years. "As a result, scholars spent time looking under the lamppost of U.S. foreign policy to locate problems in inter-American relations." The more recent "internationalist" approach first emerged largely in history and has expanded to political science and International Relations. Darnton has referred to work by Harmer, Keller, and others as an explicit attempt to "decenter" the study of US-Latin American relations away from a previous focus on US policymaking. These changes also reflected contemporary shifts in international relations in the Americas, namely the rise of "post-hegemonic" groupings and the salience of China as an outside economic option for many South American countries.

== United States's foreign relations with Latin American countries ==
Country	Formal relations began	Notes
Argentina	27 December 1823	See Argentina–United States relations: Argentina has an embassy in Washington, D.C.; United States has an embassy in Buenos Aires.
Bolivia	3 January 1849	See Bolivia–United States relations: Bolivia has an embassy in Washington, D.C.; United States has an embassy in La Paz.
Brazil	26 May 1824	See Brazil–United States relations: Brazil has an embassy in Washington, D.C.; United States has an embassy in Brasília.
Chile	23 April 1824	See Chile–United States relations: Chile has an embassy in Washington, D.C.; United States has an embassy in Santiago.
Colombia	19 June 1822	See Colombia–United States relations: Colombia has an embassy in Washington, D.C.; United States has an embassy in Bogotá.
Costa Rica	24 March 1851	See Costa Rica–United States relations: Costa Rica has an embassy in Washington, D.C.; United States has an embassy in San José.
Cuba	27 May 1902	See Cuba–United States relations: Cuba has an embassy in Washington, D.C.; United States has an embassy in Havana.
Dominican Republic	26 March 1884	See Dominican Republic–United States relations: Dominican Republic has an embassy in Washington, D.C.; United States has an embassy in Santo Domingo.
Ecuador	12 August 1848	See Ecuador–United States relations: Ecuador has an embassy in Washington, D.C.; United States has an embassy in Quito.
El Salvador	15 June 1863	See El Salvador–United States relations: El Salvador has an embassy in Washington, D.C.; United States has an embassy in San Salvador.
Guatemala	4 August 1824	See Guatemala–United States relations: Guatemala has an embassy in Washington, D.C.; United States has an embassy in Guatemala City.
Honduras	19 April 1853	See Honduras–United States relations: Honduras has an embassy in Washington, D.C.; United States has an embassy in Tegucigalpa.
Mexico	12 December 1822	See Mexico–United States relations: Mexico has an embassy in Washington, D.C.; United States has an embassy in Mexico City.
Nicaragua	24 December 1849	See Nicaragua–United States relations: Nicaragua has an embassy in Washington, D.C.; United States has an embassy in Managua.
Panama	13 November 1903	See Panama–United States relations: Panama has an embassy in Washington, D.C.; United States has an embassy in Panama City.
Paraguay	26 November 1861	See Paraguay–United States relations: Paraguay has an embassy in Washington, D.C.; United States has an embassy in Asunción.
Peru	21 May 1827	See Peru–United States relations: Peru has an embassy in Washington, D.C.; United States has an embassy in Lima.
Puerto Rico	10 December 1898	See Puerto Rico–United States relations: Territorial relations between Puerto Rico and the United States were established on December 10, 1898 when Puerto Rico became a territory of the United States.; Puerto Rico does not have an embassy but has the Puerto Rico Federal Affairs Administration in Washington, D.C. which represents the Puerto Rican government in the United States; United States does not have an embassy since Puerto Rico is its own territory, but it does have many federal buildings in Puerto Rico such as the Jose V. Toledo Federal Building and United States Courthouse in San Juan, which houses the U.S. District Court and postal services, and other federal buildings by the USPS, USCIS, FBI and others.
Uruguay	2 October 1867	See United States–Uruguay relations: United States has an embassy in Montevideo.; Uruguay has an embassy in Washington, D.C.
Venezuela	30 June 1835	See United States–Venezuela relations: United States has an embassy in Caracas.; Venezuela has an embassy in Washington, D.C.

== See also ==
- American imperialism
- Anti Americanism
- Anti-American sentiment in Latin America
- Foreign interventions by the United States
- Foreign policy of the United States
- Foreign relations of the United States
- List of United States military bases
- List of free trade agreements
- Military history of the United States
- Organization of American States
- United States involvement in regime change in Latin America
- List of United States invasions of Latin American countries
