= Francisco José Borja Cevallos =

Ecuadorian diplomat

Francisco José Borja Cevallos (born June 22, 1949) is an Ecuadorian government minister and diplomat.

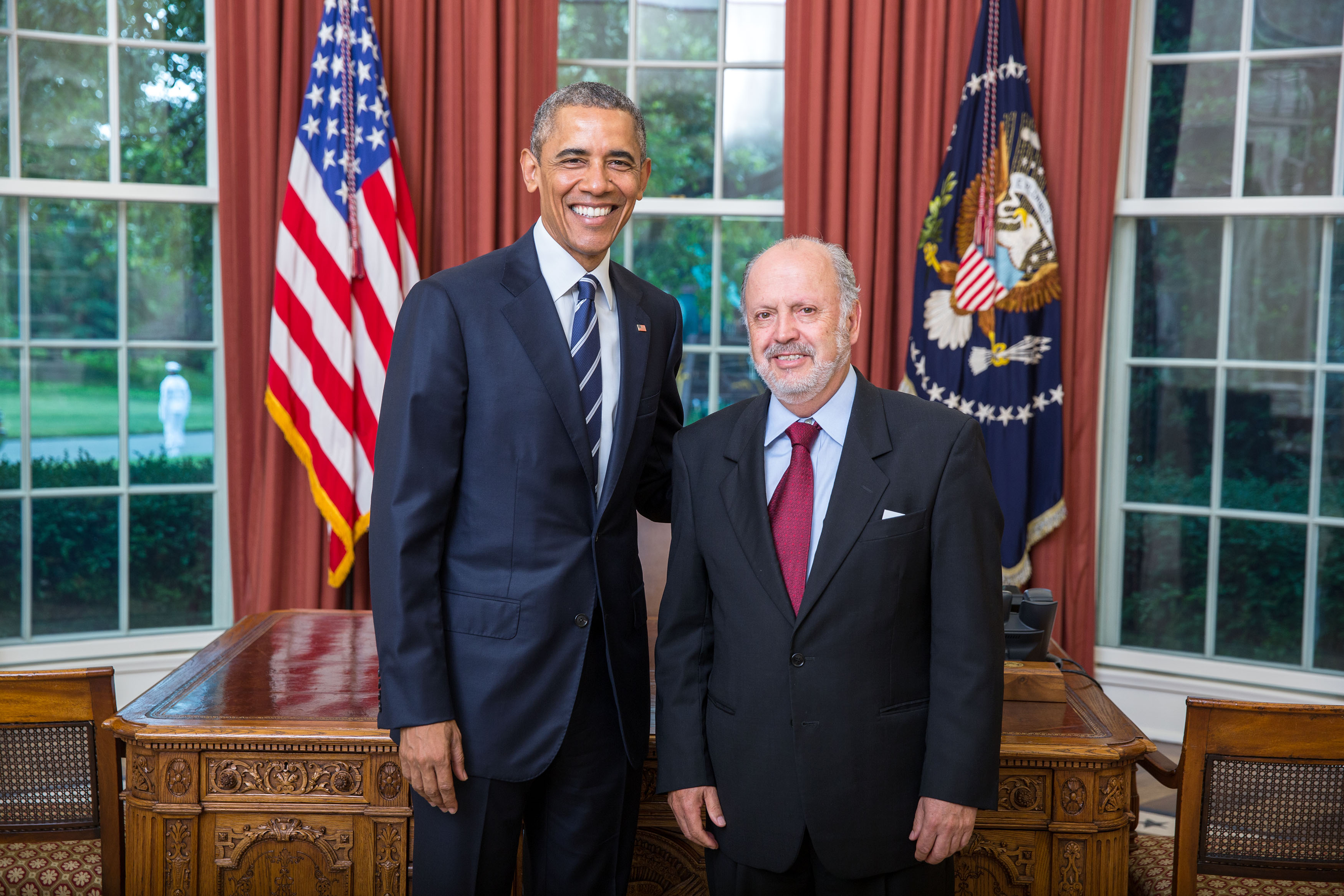

He was appointed Ecuador's ambassador to the United States in 2015, succeeding Nathalie Cely. He was succeeded by Francisco Carrión in 2018.

Prior to his diplomatic career, he worked as a journalist and editor. He was also an adviser to President Rodrigo Borja Cevallos.

He was a Minister of Culture and Heritage from September 2014 to March 2015, after serving as Ambassador to Chile since June 2007.

== See also ==
- Ecuador–United States relations
- Embassy of Ecuador in Washington, D.C.
- List of diplomatic missions of Ecuador
