= Terrorism in Ecuador =

Terrorism in Ecuador was, until the outbreak of the current security crisis due to the government's fight against drug-trafficking organizations, a relatively rare and sporadic occurrence as the country, despite periods of economic and political instability, was traditionally known as a peaceful state in Latin America. This was unlike its neighboring states, Peru and Colombia, which have suffered widespread violence by insurgent, paramilitary, and drug trafficking organizations (all using terror tactics) in different degrees for more than fifty years.

Attacks in Ecuador have traditionally been carried out by small domestic organizations (both known and anonymous) as well as, in a lesser degree, foreign Colombian groups operating within Ecuador's borders. A number of terror organizations have been inactive for several years.

== Terror groups ==
Domestic terrorist groups present in Ecuador, although some have been operationally inactive in the last few years, include the Popular Combatants Group (GCP), the Revolutionary Militia of the People (MRP), the Marxist-Leninist Party of Ecuador, and the ¡Alfaro Vive, Carajo!. AVC was notably active in the 1980s, while both the GCP and MRP variously claimed authorship for a series of attacks in the late 1990s and early 2000s.

Foreign groups include the Colombian groups Revolutionary Armed Forces of Colombia (FARC) and National Liberation Army (ELN).

== Terror attacks ==
=== 1970s ===
- August 12, 1973 – an explosion in or near the grounds of the US Consulate General in Guayaquil was reported. No further information is available.
- September 1, 1978 – eight people were wounded and heavy material damage was sustained from a bomb left at a public phone in the offices of El Universo newspaper in the coastal city of Guayaquil. The attack occurred during the interval months between the first and the second round of presidential elections, a tense political period which marked the transition from military to civilian rule.
- June 18, 1979 – the house of President-elect Jaime Roldós Aguilera in Guayaquil was machine-gunned by unknown assailants.

=== 1980s ===
- 1980 – a bomb explosion at the "Filantrópica" building in the center of Quito, popularly known as 'La Licuadora' ("The Blender"), and which housed the headquarters of Filanbanco, killed two officials of that bank. A photographer who went to the scene to cover the event was also reportedly killed after falling through one of the building's elevator shafts.
- November 26, 1982 – an unidentified individual threw a suitcase bomb with a fuze inside the Israeli Embassy in Quito (located in the third floor of a building) and fled. Policemen Manuel Jiménez Soto and Víctor Jiménez Torres took the suitcase and attempted to take it downstairs to the street, but the bomb blew up when they were just 15 feet (five meters) away from the entrance. Jiménez Soto was instantly killed and Jiménez Torres later died from his injuries at a hospital, while a woman was wounded. Israeli ambassador Eliecer Armon declared that "it wasn't hard to guess who were responsible". No threats or unusual activity were reported beforehand. No authorship could be determined.
- May 1983 – the buildings of the Foreign, Health, and Social Welfare ministries in Quito were reportedly bombed, with no information on casualties or authorship.
- January 28, 1984 – three pamphlet bombs detonated at the bus terminal in the mountain city of Cuenca. The leaflets were authored by self-defined Montoneros Alfaristas and called for a boycott of next day's general elections, which resulted in the election of León Febres Cordero; a conservative politician who became known for cracking down on left-wing subversive groups.
- May 24, 1984 – in the third anniversary of President Roldós' death in a plane crash, pamphlet bombs exploded near the US Embassy and in the Metropolitan Cathedral of Quito, with the leaflets accusing US President Ronald Reagan and the CIA of being responsible for the Roldós' plane crash. No victims were reported.
- January 9, 1985 – an accidental explosion in the Cochapamba neighborhood of Quito killed two members of Alfaro Vive Carajo. A heavy arsenal was later discovered at the site; in addition to propaganda material, instructive guerrilla handbooks, camouflage clothes and other equipment.
- July 25, 1986 – two foreign members of Alfaro Vive Carajo; Diego de Jesús Pérez (Colombian) and Patricia Román (Chilean), were detained after a failed attempt at bombing an Ecuadorian Institute of Telecommunications (now CNT) ground station. The attack was botched after a shootout with security guards watching over the telecommunications tower. The subversives were also reportedly planning armed robberies on three banks.
- April 7, 1987 – an attack with explosives occurred at the headquarters of the Provincial Transit Authority of Pichincha in Quito. According to then-Minister of Government Luis Robles Plaza, "an escalation of violence has presented in the country and it's necessary to stop it". Damages to twelve patrol cars were reported and Alfaro Vive Carajo claimed authorship through leaflets found at the site of the attack.
- June 19, 1989 – a homemade bomb exploded outside a branch of Citibank in the mountain city of Ambato. Only material damage was reported. Despite a claim by the National Police of Ecuador that they had a description of a suspect, no further details are available. No group claimed responsibility, but police sources speculated of the Revolutionary Youth Group or the Democratic People's Movement (a now-defunct legal political party). The attack occurred in a context of a dispute between the government of Rodrigo Borja (a social democrat) and Citibank over an alleged move by the bank to retain $80 million in its deposits to repay a loan.
- October 26, 1989 – five rounds of automatic fire were shot near the US Embassy in Quito, with no injuries or damage reported. According to National Police assigned to the Embassy, a white Suzuki with four occupants made three turns around the traffic circle across the street from the compound. As the vehicle started to head away, one of its occupants fired the shots. Police returned fire but is not known if any of the occupants were harmed. The incident reportedly occurred on the "Day of the Guerrilla" in Quito, during a weeklong conference of guerrilla groups.
- December 31, 1989 – one vehicle was destroyed and another damaged by two explosive devices which were thrown over the wall of the commissary/motorpool of the US Embassy, detonating 10 seconds apart from each other. The motorpool was located some 200 yards from the Embassy. The next day, an explosive device was found at the U.S. Ambassador's residence property. The device was similar to the ones used in the attack the previous day, and may had been thrown over the perimeter wall during New Year's night. The attacks occurred in a context of worldwide condemnation and protest over the United States invasion of Panama.

=== 1990s ===
- January 16, 1991 – in the context of demonstrations against Operation Desert Storm happening that day in Guayaquil, a Mormon church was bombed with only material damage as result. No claims of responsibility were made. That same day, during an evening antiwar demonstration at 8:30 p.m., a small explosion occurred near a branch of Citibank, shattering several of the bank's windows.
- January 22, 1991 – two Mormon churches were bombed by unknown individuals in the coastal cities of Portoviejo and Guayaquil, causing damages of over $2,000 in the former and $1,400 in the latter.
- February 18 and 25, 1991 – unknown attackers bombed Mormon churches in Esmeraldas (a coastal city) and Riobamba (a mountain city), causing damages amounting to nearly $400 in the former and $250 in the latter.
- January 1992 – a bomb exploded at the house of the Mayor of Guayaquil, Harry Soria. The attack took place in the context of strikes, violent protests and riots by municipal workers fired by Soria, who claimed to be fighting corruption (notably sinecure and no-show jobs) while striving to reform the city's chaotic and corrupt municipal administration. This event, and the overall tensions, led then-President Rodrigo Borja to mobilize the army in the city.
- August 4, 1993 – a hoax bomb was placed by unknown individuals at the USAID building in Quito. A small passenger van reportedly parked in the back of the building, and one of the vehicle's five male passengers distracted the local guard with conversation. The driver exited the van though did not approach the gate. When the van left, the guard found a package lay against the security Delta barrier with a note that read: "The next time for real pig American imperialists." The package was immediately examined by US Embassy security personnel and local bomb technicians, initially appearing to contain 15 dynamite sticks with two blasting caps connected with wire to a black box detonator. However, a later examination of the device found that the dynamite sticks were actually filled with dirt to give it a weight similar to that of dynamite. Additionally, the black box was in reality a cassette tape container wrapped in black tape with two wires coming from it. The wires were attached to what appeared to be the top of two blasting caps inserted into the dynamite. Police failed to find suspects and no responsibility was claimed.
- November 25, 1993 – ten men dressed in military fatigues attempted to kidnap Leonard Schorsch, an American citizen employed at American Minga oil firm, working near Shushufindi, in the Ecuadorian jungle canton of the same name. Assailants knocked at the Schorsch's residence door, but one of the bodyguards who answered the door saw the men and found that their hair was too long for them to be regular Armed Forces members. A 30-minute shootout between the bodyguards and the attackers followed, with the attacking group reportedly armed with Uzi submachine guns. During the shootout, an explosive device was hurled to the roof of the house so to induce Schorsch to come out. Two terrorists were allegedly killed during the attack before Schorsch was rescued by a military helicopter and evacuated to the city of Lago Agrio, and finally to Quito. Four of the attackers were arrested, among them two Colombians who may have been FARC members. The attackers may have been responsible for a series of kidnappings and bus robberies in the Lago Agrio area.
- October 1995 – Police detected an explosive device in the basement of the Technical Sub-Directorate of Health in Quito, where the then-Health Minister (and future President) Alfredo Palacio was about to preside over an event for the donation of medical equipment by the US Embassy.
- September 28, 1997 – the first reported bomb attack committed by the Popular Combatants Group was carried out in Quito. No casualties occurred.

=== 2000s ===
- February 16, 2000– a small bomb hidden in a videotape wounded journalist Rafael Cuesta, news editor of Telecentro television network in Guayaquil. The network had been previously threatened by a self-styled "National Liberation Army" (NLA) in order to coerce it into changing its alleged pro-governmental perspective. While authorities believed that the NLA could have been responsible, the GCP also claimed responsibility.
- February 21, 2000– the GCP claimed responsibility for another videocassette bomb mailed to Marcos Murillo, leader of the Evangelical Indians of Ecuador. However, the bomb was found and defused by Police.
- January 4 or 5, 2002– an explosive device detonated outside of Guayaquil's Palace of Justice.
- January 28, 2002– three bombs attributed to the Alfarista Revolutionary Movement detonated at different places in Quito, one of them at the centric San Francisco Plaza, a few blocks away from the Carondelet Palace, seat of the President.
- March 1, 2002– In Quito, a homemade bomb was deactivated by Police at a terrace in the Congress building.
- March 14, 2002– Another pamphlet bomb is detonated at a corner near the Guayas governorship building in Guayaquil.
- April 4, 2002– a pamphlet bomb exploded at the Consulate of Colombia in Quito.
- June 5, 2002– a pamphlet bomb attributed to the GCP detonated in the area of the Clemente Ballén and Escobedo streets in Guayaquil, near one of the entrances to the city's Metropolitan Cathedral.
- August 13, 2002– a pamphlet bomb, again attributed to the GCP, detonated in the area of the Pedro Moncayo and Vélez streets in Guayaquil.
- August 28, 2002– two pamphlet bombs detonated almost simultaneously in Guayaquil; the first detonated in the corner of the Chile and Colón streets; the second one injured three people (two children and an adult) at a McDonald's restaurant in Guayaquil's Malecón 2000 boardwalk mall, also leaving considerable material damages. The pamphlets in both explosions, self-attributed by the MRP, contained anti-US slogans.
- August 29, 2002– around 18:50 local time, a pamphlet bomb exploded at Guayaquil's Centenario Park, leaving no victims or damages. MRP-authored anti-US propaganda was found at the scene. A warning call was made before the explosions.
- September 2, 2002– an explosive device was deactivated by Police in a neighborhood north of Quito.
- September 23, 2002– Within a five-minute interval, three pamphlet bombs detonated in a Banco del Pichincha branch, at an office of the right-wing Social Christian Party, and in the University Citadel in Guayaquil, injuring one person. The MRP again claimed authorship according to Police, which claimed around eight “guerrilla cells” of another group have appeared in the east (the Amazon rainforest), on the coast, and in the Andean mountains, seeking to demonstrate their insurgent presence in the country." A police commander said that, through pamphlet bombs, the group, which he did not identify, called on people "to revolution, to insurgency, and that is the symptom of a guerrilla cell," further noting that a pre-election process in the leadup to the general elections on October 20 could be another factor.
- March 19, 2003– A pamphlet bomb injured three people and destroyed the windows of the Agriculture Ministry Building in Guayaquil.
- March 23, 2003– a grenade was thrown at the United Kingdom's consulate in Guayaquil's city center from a car by individuals who quickly fled the scene. No victims and only minor material damage were reported. The MRP self-adjudicated the attack via email, justifying it as a reaction to that month's invasion of Iraq by the US-led coalition of which the UK formed part. In this line, the nearby US-funded North American-Ecuadorian Center would also have been a target. A philosophy student from the University of Guayaquil was arrested two days later in connection to this attack, in alleged possession of flyers that alluded to the Communist Party of Ecuador, FEUE (Ecuador's largest left-wing university student union), MRP, and Alfaro Revolutionary Montoneras.
- February 16–18, 2004– Two improvised leaflet bombs exploded at the Economy Minister Mauricio Pozo's office in downtown Quito, and at the house of the Ecuadorian Supreme Electoral court chairman in Guayaquil. The attacks left only material damage, and they happened two days apart.
- May 29, 2005– a low power bomb blast occurred during a military parade in the Amazonian city of Macas. The attack only left material damage, and the Comando Revolucionario Amazónico (Revolutionary Amazonic Command in Spanish) claimed responsibility for the attack.
- October 2005– Authorities reported the alleged existence of Patria, Alfaro, Liberación - Ejército de Liberación Alfarista ("Homeland, Alfaro, Liberation - Alfarist Liberation Army"). Some human rights activists labeled this announcement a hoax, claiming it was a government attempt to criminalize social struggle.
- January 20, 2009– an improvised device blasts in the Tower A belonging to the World Trade Center of Guayaquil, leaving small material damages. The attack was claimed by Comuneros de Liberación Nacional (C-LN), mentioning that the attack was in response of the Rafael Correa's management of the economy.
- December 3, 2009– an explosive device detonated near the emergency electric generator of the Teleamazonas TV station. News presenter Jorge Ortiz suggested the attack was inspired by President Rafael Correa's attacks on freedom of speech and press, while Correa himself condemned it and ordered an investigation. A self-styled "N-15 (November 15) Movement" later claimed authorship for the attack against "media vassals of the oligarchy and imperialism", and listed a series of radical leftist policy demands.

=== 2010s ===
- November 22, 2010 – an undetonated bomb was discovered at the office of the rector at the University of Guayaquil. The Popular Combatants Group (PCG), which had been dormant for several years, claimed responsibility for the bomb.
- November 17, 2011 – an improvised explosive device (IED) exploded in the Ministry of Labor building in Quito.
- November 22, 2011 – three pamphlet bombs, using explosives under a large number of pamphlets in order to physically disseminate them, exploded in Guayaquil. The Guerrilla Army of the People N-15 and the Revolutionary Insurgent Armed Forces of Ecuador claimed responsibility for the first two bombs. No group claimed responsibility for the third.
- December 19, 2011 – three separate pamphlet bombs exploded in Guayaquil, Quito and Cuenca. No group claimed responsibility.
- July 13, 2015 – in the context of a series of anti-government protests that started a month earlier, an explosive device of unknown authorship detonated near the offices of President Rafael Correa's ruling PAIS Alliance movement in Guayaquil, leaving material damages.
- July 29, 2015 – as protests against President Correa's government continued, pamphlet bombs detonated at the headquarters of the El Universo and El Telégrafo newspapers. A "National Liberation Front" pamphlet signed by a "Commander Ramiro" warned that the attack was a "first salvo" and a "first communiqué to the youth and the people" and heavily criticized embattled President Correa's Citizen's Revolution political project, which it labeled as "corrupt" and "opportunist".
- Mid-February 2017 – in the run-up to the first round of the heavily polarized 2017 national elections, three mail parcels with alleged explosive devices were sent to journalists and news presenters Estéfani Espín (Ecuavisa) and Janet Hinostroza (Teleamazonas), as well as to the then-President of the National Assembly of Ecuador, Gabriela Rivadeneira, of the ruling PAIS Alliance. Both Rivadeneira and Hinostroza reportedly opened the parcels and, due to their characteristics and appearance, notified Police, whose anti-bomb units examined the unexploded devices. The discovery led the state-owned Correos del Ecuador mail enterprise to slow its deliveries in order to check out for more suspicious parcels, as Police were investigating the possibility that at least five more alleged mail bombs were still not detected.
- April 7, 2017 – Ecuadorian authorities disbanded a self-proclaimed "National Liberation Commoners" (Comuneros de Liberación Nacional), a small armed group engaged in extortion and kidnapping. The group operated in the provinces of Sucumbíos, Pichincha and Los Ríos provinces.
- January 27, 2018 – a car bomb exploded outside a police station in the town of San Lorenzo, on the border with Colombia, wrecking the station, damaging other houses in the area, and leaving 28 people with minor injuries. FARC dissidents were likely behind the attack. This is the first attack of this type in the history of Ecuador.

=== 2020s ===
- August 14, 2022 – an explosion in Guayaquil that killed five and injured many others was ascribed to organized crime gangs.
- March 21, 2023: A wave of letter bombs disguised as USB flash drives was mailed to at least five prominent journalists and media outlets in Ecuador, leaving one wounded. The anonymous packages contained threatening messages along with explosive devices and were sent from the central town of Quinsaloma.

== See also ==
- Crime in Ecuador
