= Ecuador–United States relations =

- Ecuador: United States

Diplomatic mission
- Embassy of Ecuador, Washington, D.C.: Embassy of the United States, Quito

Ecuador and the United States maintained close ties based on mutual interests in maintaining democratic institutions; combating cannabis and cocaine; building trade, investment, and financial ties; cooperating in fostering Ecuador's economic development; and participating in inter-American organizations. Ties are further strengthened by the presence of an estimated 150,000-200,000 Ecuadorians living in the United States and by 24,000 U.S. citizens visiting Ecuador annually, and by approximately 15,000 U.S. citizens living in Ecuador.

Relations between the two nations have been strained following Julian Assange's bid to seek political asylum in the Ecuadorian embassy in London following repeated claims that the US government was pursuing his extradition due to his work with Wikileaks. Ecuador first offered political asylum to Julian Assange in November 2010, which he then invoked by entering their London embassy in June 2012. This was then revoked in 2019, following negotiations between the Moreno administration and the British Government. Relations have since improved following the ouster of Rafael Correa from office as President of Ecuador.

== History ==
Both nations were early signatories of the Inter-American Treaty of Reciprocal Assistance (the Rio Treaty) of 1947, the Western Hemisphere's regional mutual security treaty. However, under the Correa administration, Ecuador denounced the treaty in February 2014, a legal prerequisite by which Ecuador would leave the treaty in 2016. Ecuador shares U.S. concern over increasing narcotrafficking and international terrorism and has energetically condemned terrorist actions, whether directed against government officials or private citizens. The government has maintained Ecuador virtually free of coca production since the mid-1980s and is working to combat money laundering and the transhipment of drugs and chemicals essential to the processing of cocaine.

According to CIA critic and former CIA agent who was stationed in Ecuador Philip Agee, the CIA carried out extensive operations and political manipulation in Ecuador in the early 1960s. For instance the CIA was involved in the group the Ecuadorian Anti-Communist Action.

Ecuador and the U.S. agreed in 1999 to a 10-year arrangement whereby U.S. military surveillance aircraft could use the airbase at Manta, Ecuador, as a Forward Operating Location to detect drug trafficking flights through the region. The arrangement expired in 2009; former president Rafael Correa vowed not to renew it, and since then Ecuador has not had any foreign military facilities in the country.

In fisheries issues, the United States claims jurisdiction for the management of coastal fisheries up to 200 mile (370 km) from its coast, but excludes highly migratory species; Ecuador, on the other hand, claims a 200-mile (370-km) territorial sea, and imposes license fees and fines on foreign fishing vessels in the area, making no exceptions for catches of migratory species. In the early 1970s, Ecuador seized about 100 foreign-flag vessels (many of them U.S.) and collected fees and fines of more than $6 million. After a drop-off in such seizures for some years, several U.S. tuna boats were again detained and seized in 1980 and 1981.

The U.S. Magnuson Fishery Conservation and Management Act then triggered an automatic prohibition of U.S. imports of tuna products from Ecuador. The prohibition was lifted in 1983, and although fundamental differences between U.S. and Ecuadorian legislation still exist, there is no current conflict. During the period that has elapsed since seizures which triggered the tuna import ban, successive Ecuadorian governments have declared their willingness to explore possible solutions to this problem with mutual respect for longstanding positions and principles of both sides. The election of Rafael Correa in October 2006, has strained relations between the two countries and relations have since been fraught with tension. Rafael Correa was heavily critical of U.S. foreign policy whilst in office.

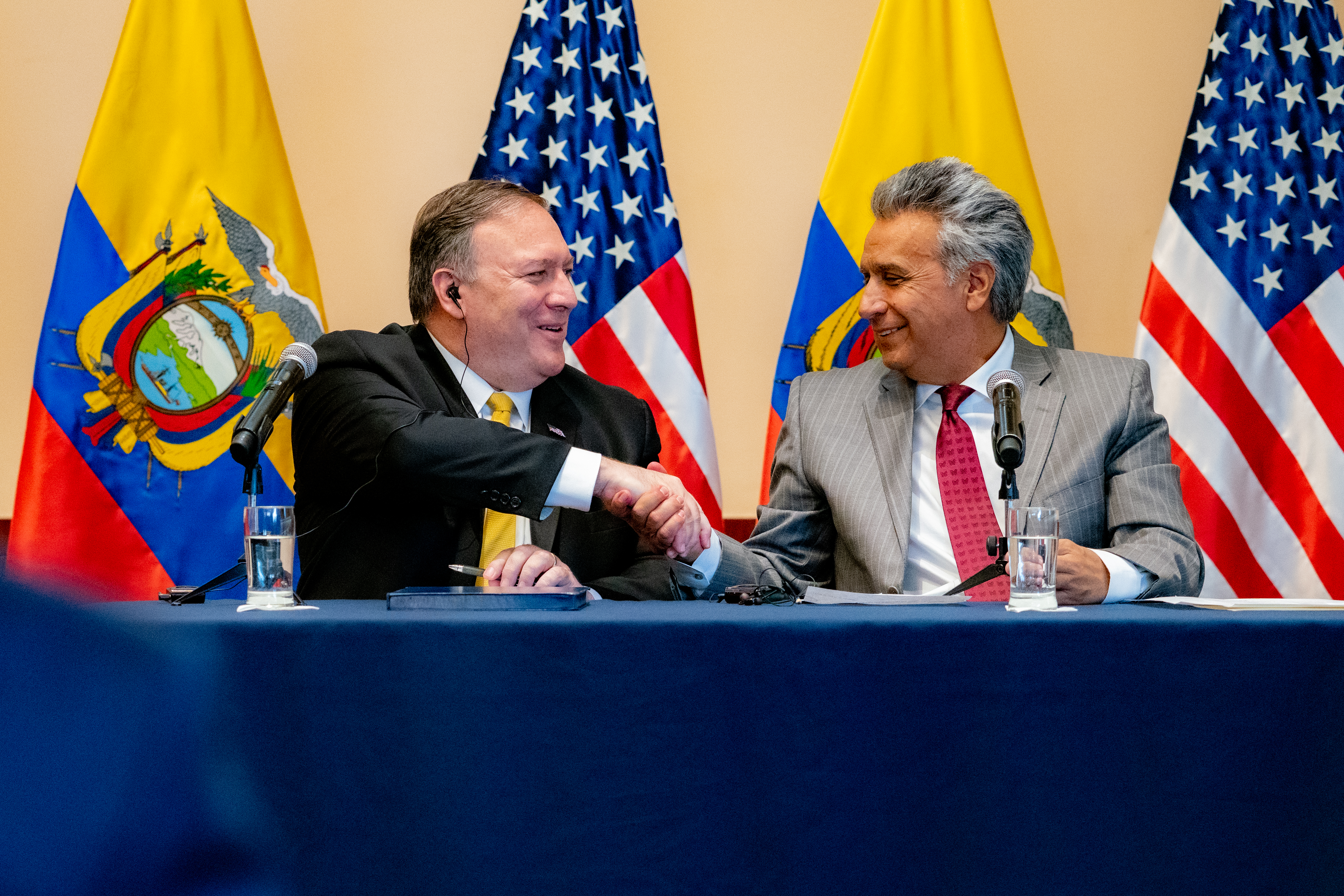
Ecuadorian President Lenín Moreno with U.S. Secretary of State Mike Pompeo, 20 July 2019

In April 2011, relations between Ecuador and the United States soured particularly after Ecuador expelled the U.S. ambassador after a leaked diplomatic cable was shown accusing president Correa of knowingly ignoring police corruption. In reciprocation, the Ecuadorian ambassador Luis Gallegos was expelled from the United States.

In 2013, when Ecuador unilaterally pulled out of a preferential trade pact with the United States over claiming the U.S. used it as blackmail in regards to the asylum request of Edward Snowden, relations between Ecuador and the United States reached an all-time low. The pact offered Ecuador US$23 million, which it offered to the U.S. for human rights training. Tariff free imports had been offered to Ecuador in exchange for drug elimination efforts.

Julian Assange applied for Ecuadorian citizenship on 16 September 2017, which Ecuador granted on 12 December 2017. However, this development was not announced until 25 January 2018.

In April 2019, Assange was arrested by the Metropolitan Police. President of Ecuador, Lenin Moreno, stated that he had 'violated the terms of his asylum'. British Foreign Secretary, Jeremy Hunt stated that the British and Ecuadorian governments had been co-operating since Moreno's inauguration and aimed to resolve the situation. Assange extradition to the United States was denied, due to a combination of his ill health and the nature of the US carceral system.

The relations with the United States improved significantly during the presidency of Lenin Moreno (2017-2021). In February 2020, his visit to Washington was the first meeting between an Ecuadorian and U.S. president in 17 years. In June 2019, Ecuador had agreed to allow US military planes to operate from an airport on the Galapagos Islands.

In January 2026, during Operation Metro Surge, an ICE agent reportedly tried to enter the Ecuadorian consulate in Minneapolis. The Ecuadorian Foreign Affairs Ministry filed a diplomatic note of protest after the incident. In March 2026, the United States launched military operations against "designated terrorist organizations" in Ecuador, dubbed Operation Total Extermination, as part of the Ecuadorian conflict. Ecuadorian president Daniel Noboa has been considered a close ally of U.S. president Donald Trump. In March 2025, Trump met with Noboa in Florida.

In June 2026, Ecuadorian President Daniel Noboa visited the USA. At the Pentagon United States Secretary of Defense, Pete Hegseth, thanked Noboa for being a founding member of the US-led Americas Counter-Cartel Coalition (Shield of the Americas).

== Education ==
American schools in Ecuador:

- Colegio Americano de Quito
- Inter-American Academy of Guayaquil
- Academia Cotopaxi
- Alliance Academy International

== Resident diplomatic missions ==
of Ecuador in the United States

- Washington, D.C. (Embassy)
- Washington. D.C. (Consulate-General)
- Atlanta (Consulate-General)
- Chicago (Consulate-General)
- Houston (Consulate-General)
- Long Island City (Consulate-General)
- Los Angeles (Consulate-General)
- Miami (Consulate-General)
- Minneapolis (Consulate-General)
- New Haven (Consulate-General)
- New York City (Consulate-General)
- Newark (Consulate-General)
- Phoenix (Consulate-General)

of the United States in Ecuador

- Quito (Embassy)
- Guayaquil (Consulate-General)

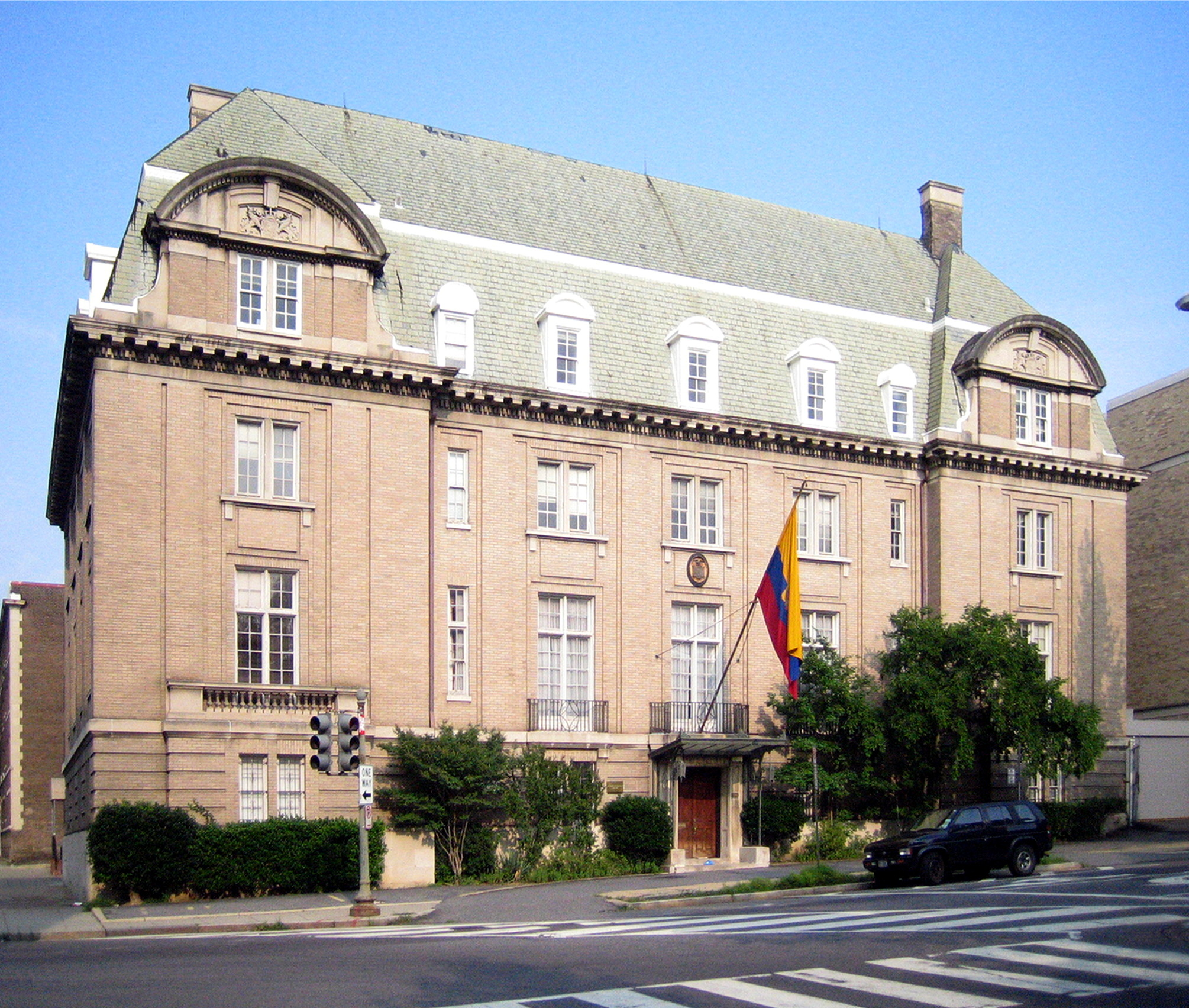
Embassy of Ecuador in Washington, D.C.

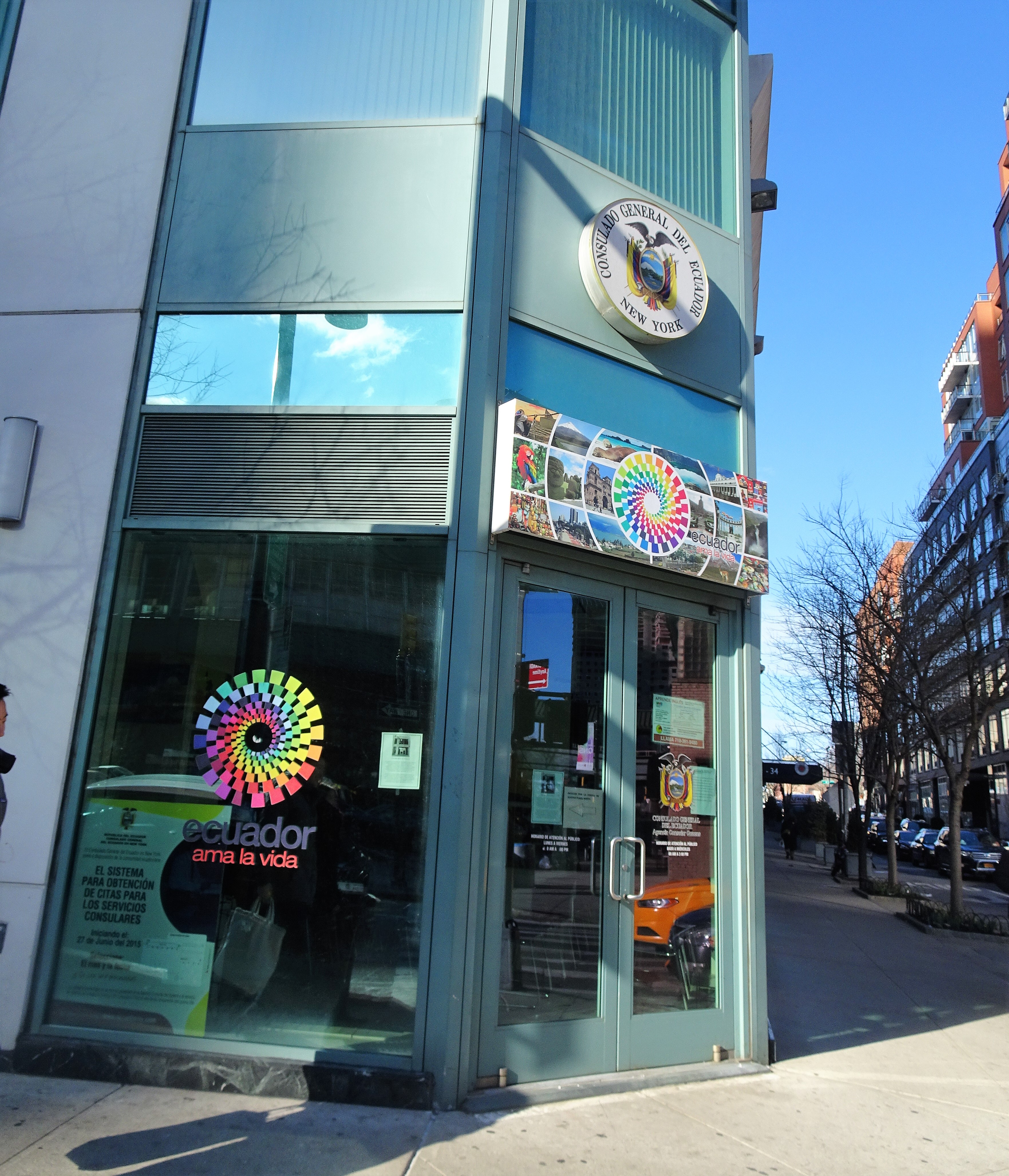
Consulate-General of Ecuador in Long Island City

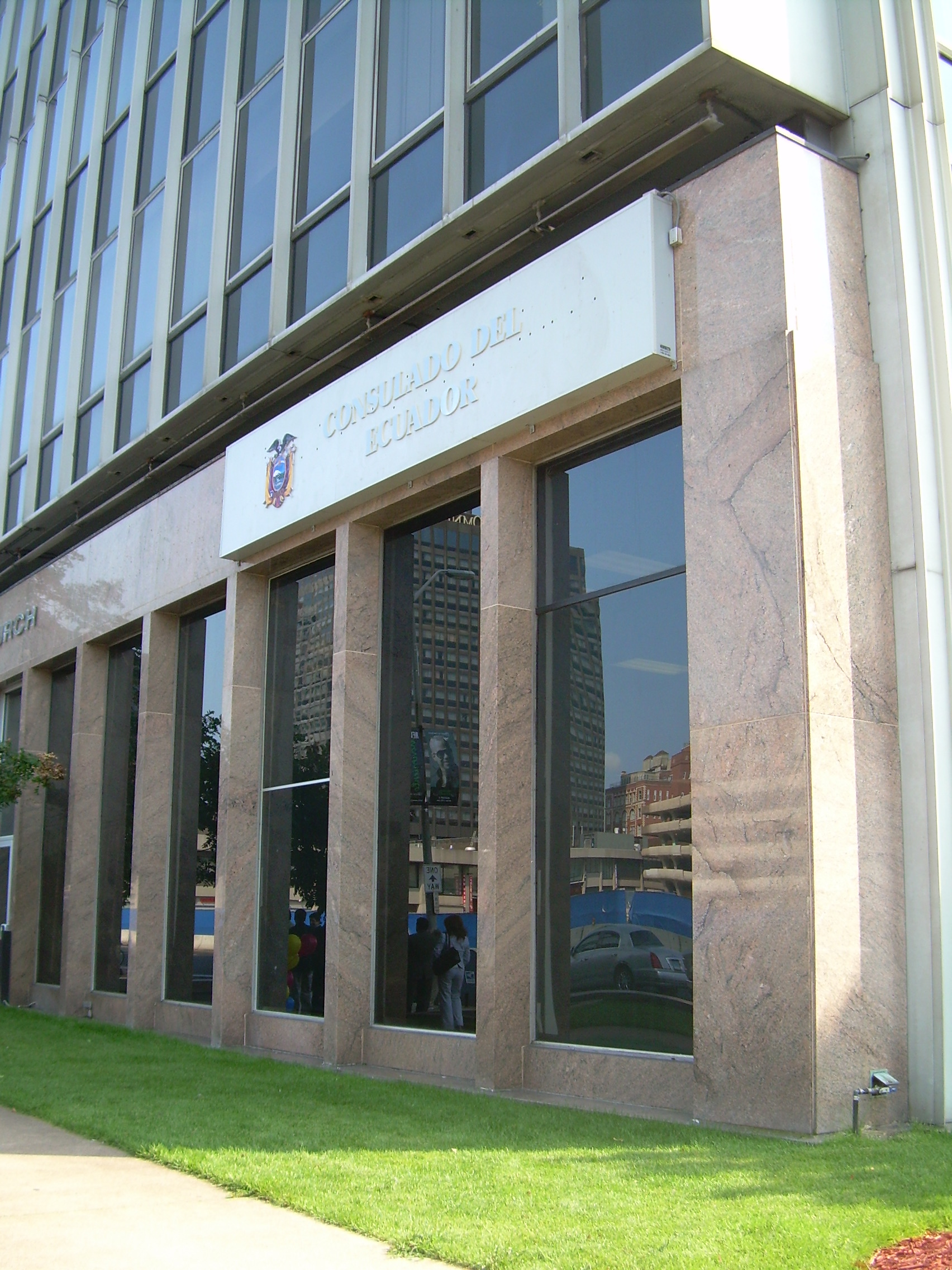
Consulate-General of Ecuador in New Haven
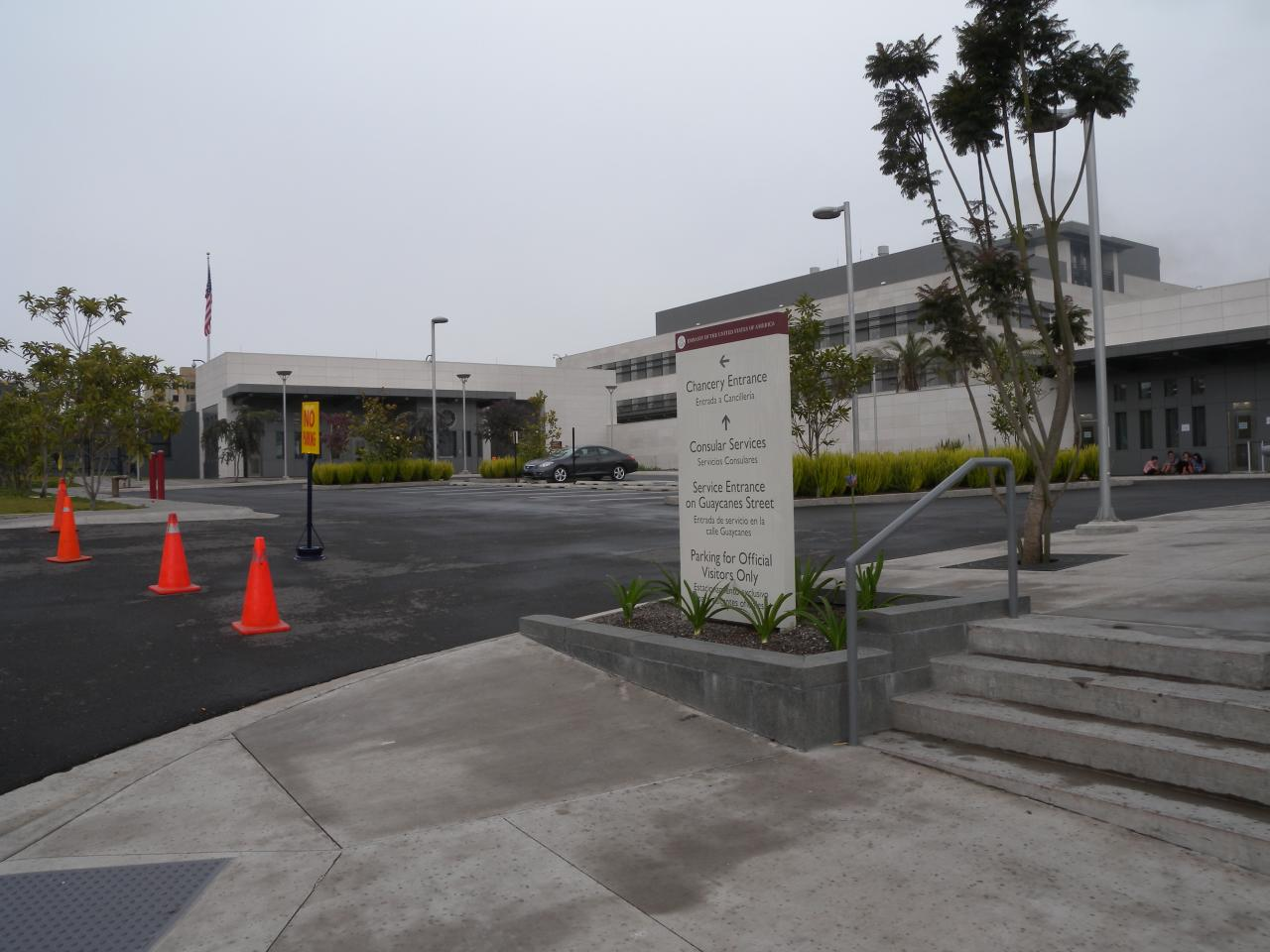
Embassy of the United States in Quito

== See also ==
- Foreign relations of Ecuador
- Foreign relations of the United States
- Americans in Ecuador
- Ecuadorian Americans
- Latin America–United States relations
