= Emilio Rafael Izquierdo Miño =

Ecuadorian diplomat

Ecuadorian Ambassador to Italy
- In office 2003–2007
- Preceded by: [[ ]]
- Succeeded by: Juan Holguin Flores

Ecuadorian Ambassador to Uruguay
- In office 2010–2016
- Preceded by: [[ ]]
- Succeeded by: Galo Galarza Dávila

Ecuadorian Ambassador to the United Nations Office at Geneva
- Incumbent
- Assumed office January 28, 2019
- Preceded by: Luis Gallegos

Personal details
- Born: 28 July 1952 (age 73)

Emilio Rafael Izquierdo Miño is an Ecuadorian diplomat, since January 28, 2019 he is Permanent Representative of Ecuador to the United Nations Office at Geneva.

On January 28, 2019 he presented his credentials to Michael Møller, the Director-General of the United Nations Office as Geneva's Permanent Representative of Ecuador to the United Nations Office at Geneva.

== Career ==
He joined the Ecuadorian Ministry for Foreign Affairs in 1972 and served at Ecuador's Embassy in London the United Kingdom from 1978 to 1983. From 1986 to 1991 he was employed at Embassy of Ecuador in Washington, D.C., the United States. From 1995 to 1997 he was Alternate Permanent Representative of Ecuador to the United Nations . From 1998 to 1999 he served as Deputy Permanent Representative of Ecuador to the United Nations in New York. From 2000 to 2003 he was General Director of the Diplomatic Academy. In 2003 he was Undersecretary for Institutional Development. From 2003 to 2007 he was Ecuador's Ambassador to Italy, and concurrently to Turkey and Slovenia, as well as Ecuador's Permanent Representative to the United Nations organizations based in Rome. From 2007 to 2009 he was Under-Secretary of State for Multilateral Relations. From 2009 to 2010 he was Secretary of the Pro Tempore Presidency of the Union of South American Nations . In 2009 and 2010 he has taught international public law, history of international relations, international humanitarian law, international organizations and the history of music, and was the Director of the School of Political Science and International Relations of the University of the Americas. From 2010 to 2016 he was Ecuador's Ambassador in Montevideo Uruguay, and concurrently starting in 2016 Permanent Representative of Ecuador to the Latin American Integration Association. From 2017 to 2018 he served as the Representative of Ecuador and National Coordinator to the Union of South American Nations .

Mr. Izquierdo Miño has a bachelor's degree in political science, is a lawyer, and has a Ph.D. in jurisprudence from the Pontificia Universidad Católica del Ecuador. He also has diplomas in public and private international law from the Hispanic Culture Institute Madrid, Spain; in international policy from the Foundation for International Studies and Research in Florence, Italy; and in conflict resolution from the University of Uppsala, Sweden.
