= Americans in Ecuador =

Ecuadorian Americans

Americans in Ecuador "Estadounidenses en Ecuador"
Total population
- 5,000 - 15,000

Regions with significant populations
- Cuenca · Quito · Loja

Languages
- American English · Ecuadorian Spanish

Related ethnic groups
- American diaspora · Ecuadorian Americans

Americans in Ecuador consists of immigrants from the United States to Ecuador which includes but is not exclusive to many retirees. It is estimated that about 5,000 to 10,000 American immigrants now live in the country.

== Retirement ==
Cuenca is home to many retirees from all over the United States. They were drawn there by quality health care, a booming social scene and a low cost of living. Americans first came to Cuenca in a slow trickle and many years later a deluge of retirees began settling there. The mayor of Cuenca estimated that about 4,000 Americans are now living there.

Loja is also home to many American retirees who settled there for its scenery and weather. Many retirees there have been accepted into the local community rather than being stereotyped as part of the American enclave.

== Education ==
American schools in Ecuador:

- Colegio Americano de Quito
- Inter-American Academy of Guayaquil

== See also ==
- Ecuador–United States relations
- Ecuadorian American
