= List of permanent representatives of Ecuador to the United Nations Office at Geneva =

List of permanent representatives of Ecuador to the United Nations Office at Geneva

The Ecuadorian permanent representative to the United Nations Office at Geneva represents the government in Quito to the intituitons of the United Nations situated in Geneva.

- 1955: Teodoro Bustamante Muñoz
- 1971: José Ricardo Martinez Cobo
- 1976 to 1982: Ximena Martínez de Pérez
- 1990 to 1995: Eduardo Santos Alvite
- 1997 to 2000: Luis Gallegos
- 2003 to 2005: Hernán Escudero Martínez
- 2008 to 2009: María Fernanda Espinosa
- October 2014 to May 2017: María Fernanda Espinosa
- August 21, 2017: Guillaume Long
- March 13, 2018: Luis Gallegos
- January 28, 2019: Emilio Rafael Izquierdo Miño
