= Nathalie Cely =

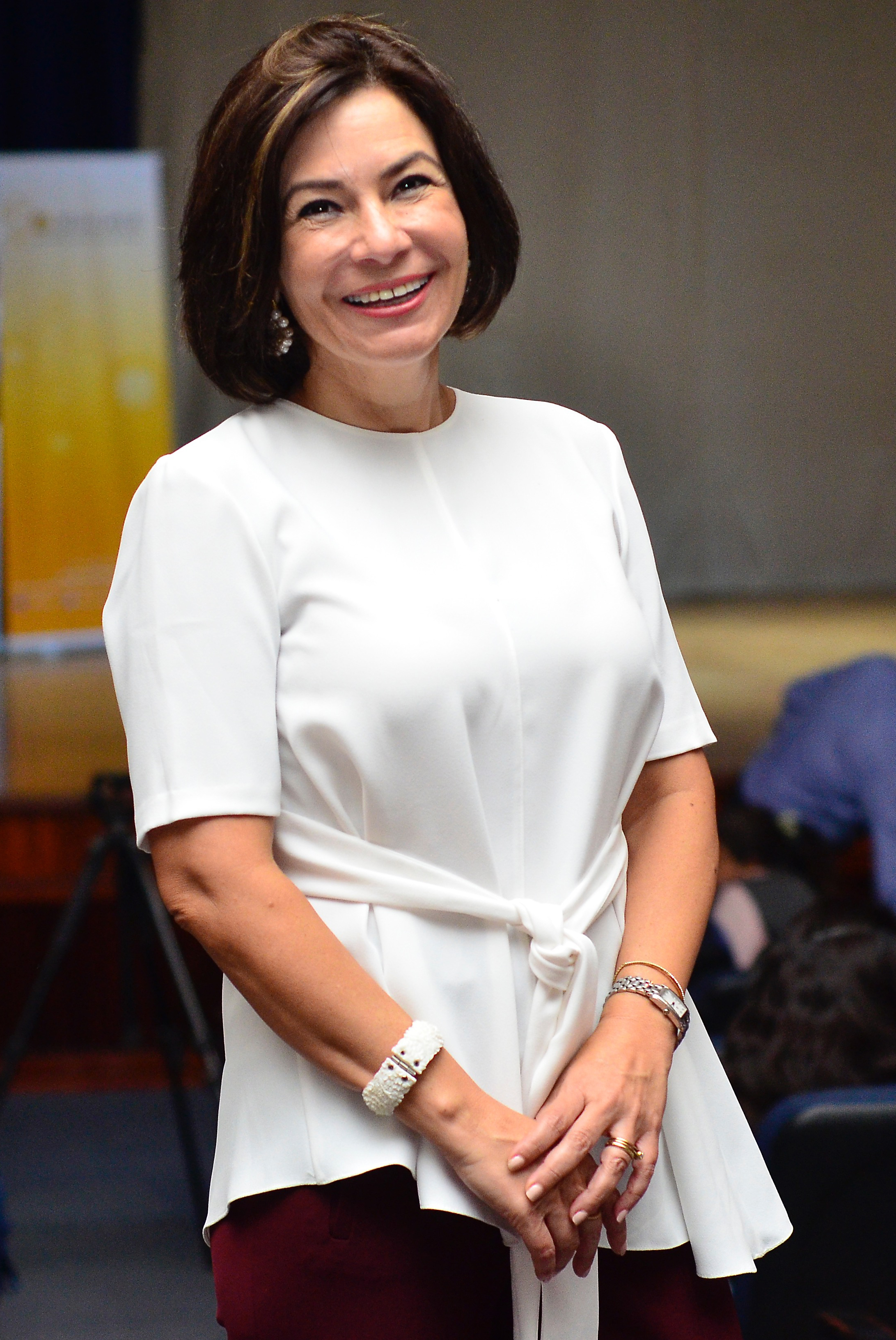

Ecuador Ambassador to the United States
- In office 2012–2015
- Preceded by: Luis Gallegos
- Succeeded by: Francisco José Borja Cevallos

Nathalie Cely Suárez (born 28 December 1965 in Portoviejo) is the former Minister of Production of Ecuador and former Ecuador Ambassador to the United States, in Washington, D.C.

== Biography ==
She graduated from the Universidad Católica de Guayaquil in 1990 with a degree in economics. From May 2009 until November 2011, Cely served as the Coordinating Minister of Production, Employment and Competitiveness. She later served as Ecuador's Coordinating Minister of Social Development from March 2007 to April 2009, and as Ambassador to the United States from 18 January 2012 to early 2015.

Cely was formerly president of Edúcate, an education foundation, and an executive at Stratega, a group working with sustainable business.

With a grant from the Inter-American Development Bank, she attended Harvard University's John F. Kennedy School of Government, graduating in 2001 with a Master's in Public Administration and a Diploma in Public Policy. She was also a PhD student at the Latin American Social Sciences Institute.

== See also ==
- Embassy of Ecuador in Washington, D.C.
