= Colegio Americano de Quito =

Location
- Calle Velasco Ibarra, entre Av. Los Conquistadores y José Borja; Quito, Pichincha; Ecuador; 0.084°S 78.464°W

Information
- Type: Private school
- Established: 1940
- Director: Frank Volpe (2022)
- Enrollment: c,2,200 students
- Website: fcaq.k12.ec

The Fundación Colegio Americano de Quito or Colegio Americano de Quito (American School of Quito) is a private college preparatory school in Quito, Ecuador. In 1940 it was founded by the former president of Ecuador and the president of the Organization of American States (OAS) Galo Plaza Lasso, and Boaz Long.

== History ==
The American School of Quito was founded on October 14, 1940 to 162 students. The first directors were Robert E. and Mrs. Hazel J. Tucker, who had just arrived from the United States. The founders of the school lived in a time characterized by the fascist movements in Europe, represented in Ecuador and other South American nations by the German and Italian schools operating.

The school hired English-speaking, U.S.-educated Ecuadorian teachers to teach civics, geography, history of Ecuador, and Spanish classes, while Americans taught the other classes. The Ecuadorian Ministry of Education cooperated with the foundation of the school. The U.S. and Ecuadorian governments did not have plans to financially aid the school. The school used an educational program derived from the Santa Barbara, California public schools and the Columbia University Lincoln School.

In 2022 the American School had over 2,200 students from Nursery to twelfth grade. Among these students are the children and grandchildren of founding families. The school is co-educational, non-religious, and is a non-profit foundation. It is accredited by Cognia and the Ecuadorian Ministry of Education and Culture. It is recognized by the International Baccalaureate Organization and offers both I.B. Programmes: Middle Years and Diploma. American School graduates can obtain three diplomas: a high school diploma accredited in the United States, the Ecuadorian Bachillerato, and the I.B. Diploma.

== Student Council ==
Every year students from high school vote for the Student Council. The student Council is a group of representatives for high school that run activities and organize events. Candidates from the Student Council come from 11th or 12th (Secretary, Treasurer and Vice-President), and 12th grade only (President).

== Model United Nations ==
The School hosts the largest Model United Nations in Ecuador each year, CAMINU (Colegio Americano Modelo Internacional Naciones Unidas), which include local and international schools, thus contributing to the practice of democratic principles and the analysis of global and local issues in Ecuador.

== Hymn ==
Gloria a tí, Colegio Americano

== Notable alumni and staff ==
- Barbara Morgan taught here from 1978 to 1979. She taught English and science for one year. She was later an astronaut on the Space Shuttle.
- Marcelo Aguirre, artist
- Rodrigo Borja, former President of Ecuador;
- Francisco Carrion, Minister of Foreign Affairs for Ecuador;
- Diego Fernando Cordova, former Ecuadorian ambassador
- David Davidovic, Vice-President at Merck, Genentech and Roche
- Gina Davidovic, President of Bay3000 Corporate Education
- Freddy Ehlers, journalist, Minister
- Luis Fierro, economist, writer, former Vice-Minister of Economy of Ecuador
- Santiago Gangotena González, earned a PhD degree in Physics from University of North Carolina, Chapell Hill and founded the first liberal arts university in Ecuador, Universidad San Francisco de Quito
- Edna Iturralde, author
- Joseph J. Kohn, Princeton Maths Professor
- Carlos Larreategui, former Minister, Chancellor of UDLA (Universidad de Las Americas)
- César Montúfar, presidential candidate, former Member of the National Assembly, Ph.D. in Political Science
- Verónica Montúfar, secretaria ejecutiva Amnistía internacional Ecuador (1991-1996), Responsable de Igualdad de género y de trabajadores con discapacidad (ISP Ecuador).
- Gian-Carlo Rota, mathematician and MIT professor,
- Guadalupe Mantilla, Director of the newspaper "El Comercio"
- Alvaro Mantilla, Director of the newspaper "Hoy"
- Martin Pallares, journalist and writer
- Rodrigo Paz, former mayor of Quito
- Frank Wilbauer, Director of the Red Cross, Ecuador
- Seye Adelekan, Musician
- Maria Fernanda Rea, Vice-President and Corporate Controller of Geodis Logistics Co.
- Xavier Ponce, Chairman of the Ecuadorian American Chamber of Commerce

== See also ==
- Americans in Ecuador
- Ecuador–United States relations
