= Hernán Escudero Martínez =

Executive Secretary of Organización Latinoamericana de Energía
- In office 1973–1975
- Succeeded by: 1975-1978:Carlos Miranda Pacheco...enero 2017-2020: Alfonso Blanco Bonilla

Ecuadorian Ambassador to Peru
- In office 1988–1992
- Succeeded by: José Ayala Lasso

Ecuadorian Ambassador to the United Nations Office at Geneva
- In office March 25, 2003 – 2005
- Preceded by: María Fernanda Espinosa
- Succeeded by: Luis Gallegos

Personal details
- Born: 5 May 1946 Quito, Ecuador

Hernán Escudero Martínez is an Ecuadorian diplomat and professor.

He was born in Quito, Ecuador (5 May 1946). Escudero has occupied several high ranking positions in international diplomacy including being the first Executive Secretary of Organización Latinoamericana de Energía, Deputy Permanent Representative of Ecuador to the United Nations in New York City, Ambassador of Ecuador to Peru and Permanent Representative of Ecuador to the United Nations and the WTO in Geneva. During his tenure in Geneva, Escudero served as chairman of the Executive Committee of the UNHCR. He holds a Master of Arts degree in International Relations from the Fletcher School of Law and Diplomacy. Escudero has been awarded the Order of the Sun of Peru and the Order of Bernardo O'Higgins both in the degree of Grand Cross.
