= Ecuadorian USB bomb attacks =

The Ecuadorian USB bomb attacks occurred in March 2023 when boobytrapped USB drives were sent to Ecuadorian media. One journalist was injured.

Lenin Artieda suffered minor injuries when he plugged in a USB drive he had received at Ecuavisa in Guayaquil. Police carried out a controlled explosion on a similar device sent to TC Televisión, also in Guayaquil. Freedom of expression group Fundamedios said that a third media group had been attacked. Teleamazonas said that one of their journalists had received an anonymous envelope with a device inside that police confirmed contained explosives.

Other devices sent via post either never exploded or were never opened.

Two of the devices were found at media outlets in Guayaquil, two in Quito and one at a package delivery company. The government called the incident a terrorist attack.

== Victims ==
- Lenín Artieda (Ecuavisa): He was the only journalist who actually connected the device. He sustained minor injuries to his hands and face following the detonation.
- Mauricio Ayora (TC Televisión): The envelope arrived addressed to him, but the device was not connected, and the police carried out a controlled explosion.
- Milton Pérez (Teleamazonas): An anonymous envelope was received and also neutralized by security forces before it could be opened.
- Other sources: Press freedom organizations such as Fundamedios confirmed that the attacks sought to silence investigative journalism.

== Reactions ==
The department of the attorney general of Ecuador confirmed that it had opened a terrorism investigation on 20 March 2023. According to interior minister Juan Zapata the letters were all sent from the same town, with three going to Guayaquil and two to Quito. The anonymous packages contained threatening messages along with explosive devices and were sent from the central town of Quinsaloma.

The head of the forensic sciences services said the devices contained "military-type" explosives.

The Committee to Protect Journalists expressed his preoccupation pointing to it as part of a series of threats against journalists by organized crime and federal government, calling the attack "A clear message to silence journalists".

In a statement, the Inter American Press Association condemned the explosive attacks in Ecuador and urged Ecuadorian authorities to guarantee the safety of media workers, "as well as to investigate this attack on press freedom swiftly and thoroughly".
