= Patricio Alberto Chávez Závala =

Former Ecuadorian government official

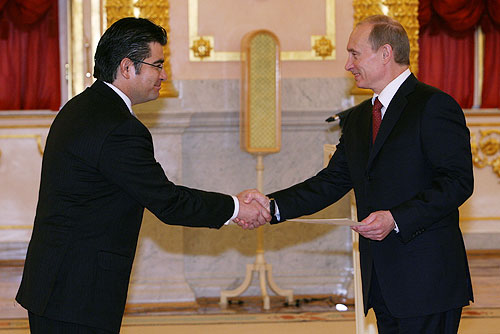
- Chávez Závala presenting his credentials to Russian president Vladimir Putin on 11 December 2007, Moscow Kremlin.

Ecuadorian Ambassador to Rusia
- In office December 11, 2007 – May 28, 2015
- President: Rafael Correa Vladimir Putin
- Preceded by: Alvaro Roberto Ponce Alvarado
- Succeeded by: Julio César Prado Espinosa

Personal details
- Born: 21 February 1967 (age 59) Quito

Patricio Alberto Chávez Závala is an Ecuadorian mechanical engineer, who was as political appointee from 11 December 2007 to May 28, 2015 Ambassador of Ecuador to Russia.

== Education and career ==
He received his primary education at the Eugenio Espejo school, continued at Sebastián de Betancurt College.

In 1986, he went to the USSR to study at the Faculty of Car Repair at the Moscow Automobile and Road Institute (MADI) (now MADGTU).

In 1990, after successful completion and obtaining a degree in mechanical engineering, he continued his studies in the magistracy of this faculty. At the same time he studied at the faculty of foreign languages MADGTU.

After receiving a master's degree in engineering and engineering from MADGTU and an additional specialty, the Russian language teacher returned to his homeland, where in 1992-1993 he worked as technical director at PROMECYF (Factory of Armored Vehicles and Defense).

In 1993-1995 he was the head of the National Industrial Administration (Steel products from Ecuador).

In 1996-2003, he held the position of General Director of SVETLANROSS: EXPORTOFQUALITYFLOWERS, in 2001-2003 - General Director of SVENTLAN ROSS INTERNATIONAL CARGO AGENCY.

In 2003, he received a master's degree in business management in personnel management as a result of his studies at the Faculty of Business Administration at the University of San Francisco in Quito, Ecuador (2001-2003).

From 2004 to 2006, he worked as the General Director of SVETLAN ROSS CONSOULTING CIA LTDA, the chief consultant, administrator of the development and personnel management group in the Human Resources Management Department of the Consulting Services Administration Department. During the same period, he studied at the Faculty of Law of Private Technical University of Loja, Quito, Ecuador, and also served as Assistant Professor at the Department of Company Management, University of San Francisco in Quito, currently undergoing postgraduate studies at the Latin Institute Merica Russian Academy of Sciences Department of Political Science. Diplomatic mission At the professional level, Patricio Chavez began to engage in relations between Russia and Ecuador in 2003, when he was appointed representative of Ecuador in the Russian-Latin American Association for Higher Education, and also became president of the Russian-Latin American Fund for Ecuador. He held these positions until 2007, when he was appointed head of the diplomatic mission of Ecuador in Russia with the rank of Ambassador Extraordinary and Plenipotentiary and again went to Russia.
