= Embassy of the United States, Quito =

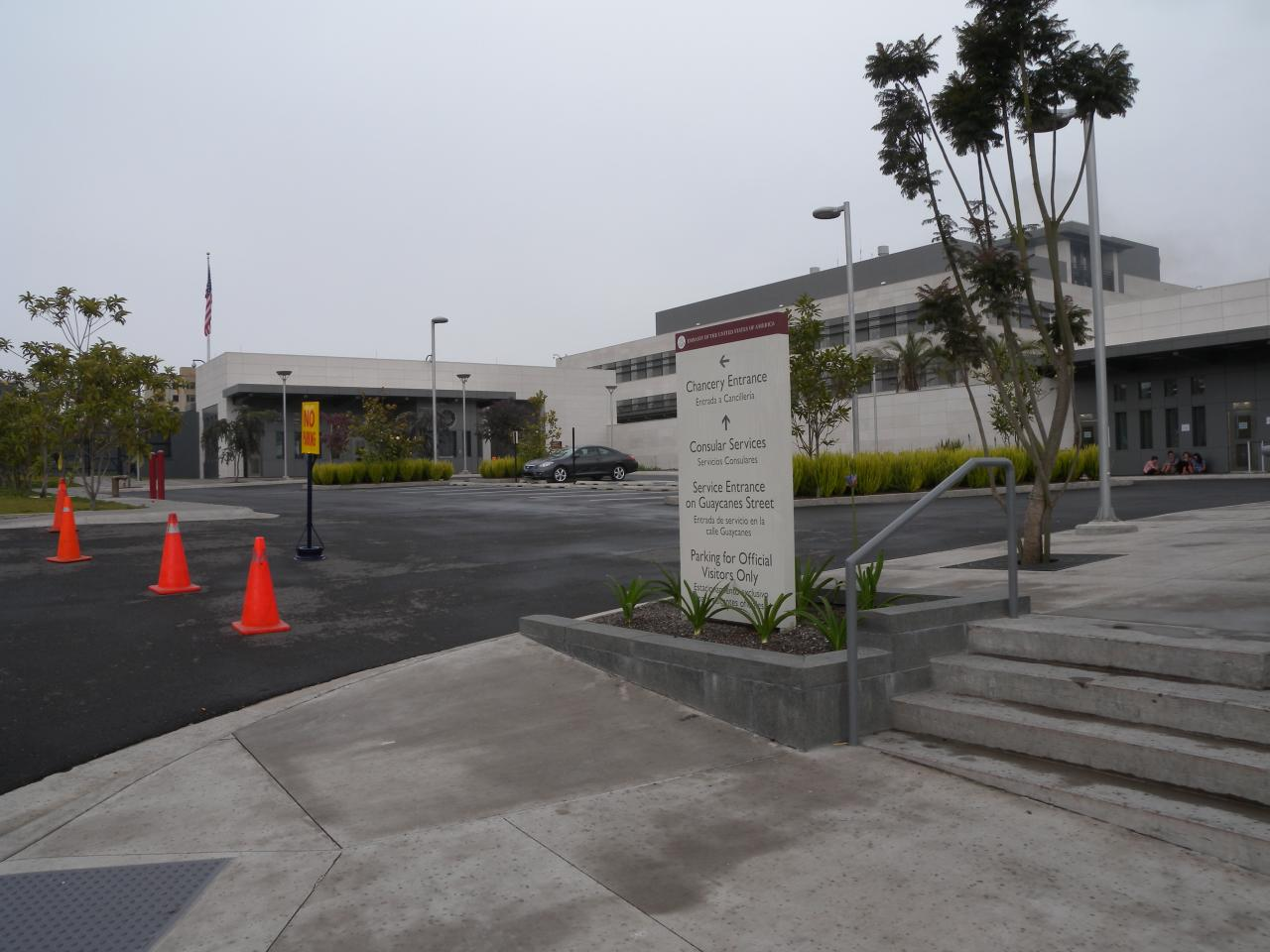
- Location: Quito, Ecuador
- Address: Av. Avigiras, Av. Eloy Alfaro E12-170 y, Quito 170124, Ecuador
- Coordinates: 0°8′17″S 78°28′5″W
- Website: https://ec.usembassy.gov

The Embassy of the United States in Quito is the diplomatic mission of the United States of America in Ecuador.

== History ==
Initial diplomatic interactions began when William Wheelwright was confirmed by the U.S. Senate as the first U.S. Consul in Guayaquil in 1825. Diplomatic recognition of Ecuador as a separate state from the Colombian federation by the United States followed in 1832, subsequent to Ecuador's secession from Colombia in 1830. The first U.S. diplomatic agent resident in Quito was designated in 1848. The rank of the U.S. mission in Ecuador was elevated from a Legation to an embassy in 1942, with Boaz Long serving as the first U.S. Ambassador to Ecuador. This was a significant advancement in the diplomatic ties between the two countries.

The U.S. Ambassador's Residence in Quito was purchased in 1942. Construction commenced in 1946 and was completed to host Ambassador John F. Simmons in 1950.

In 2004, the United States bought six hectares of land in Northern Quito in order to change the location its embassy, which had been in the city center since 1960, in order to strengthen its security. The cost of the new embassy was estimated at $129 million, while the four-story building that hosted the US embassy was sold to Ecuador for $4.5 million. The new embassy was characterized, in the words of architectural historian Jane C. Loeffer, by a "prison-like look and high perimeter wall that is typical of SED structures". (Note: A Standard Embassy Design (SED) is a post-9/11 embassy architectural design meant to enhance security. See Loeffer (2012) for a discussion.)

On April 5, 2011, U.S. Ambassador Heather Hodges was declared as persona non-grata by the Ecuadorian government following the WikiLeaks cable releases, which alleged that Ecuadorian President Rafael Correa knowingly promoted a corrupt officer to head the police.

== See also ==
- Ecuador–United States relations
- Embassy of Ecuador, Washington, D.C.
- List of ambassadors of the United States to Ecuador
