= Edna Iturralde =

Ecuadorian author (born 1948)

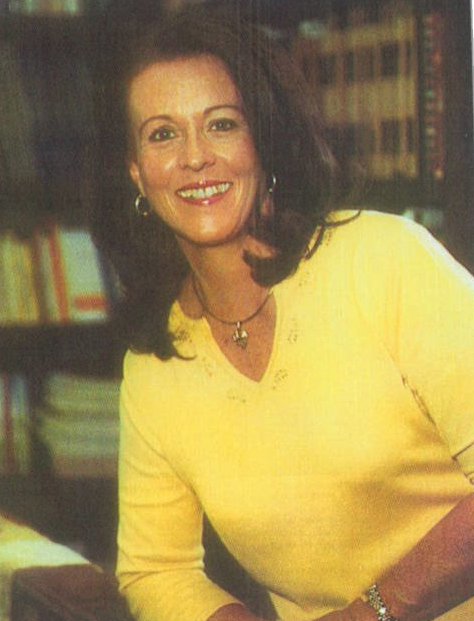
- Born: 10 May 1948 (age 77); Quito, Ecuador
- Genre: Children's and young adult fiction Multicultural short stories and novels magic realism historical fiction picture books ecological novels mythical fantasy
- Spouse: Bruce Kernan
- Children: six children

Website
- ednaiturralde.com

Edna Iturralde (born 1948) is an Ecuadorian author. With fifty-seven books published, some of them in Colombia, Mexico, Peru, and Spain, she is a 2014 International Latino Book Awards Finalist. Edna has six children and nine grandchildren. She lives in Quito, Ecuador in the Valley of Tumbaco with her husband and four dogs, who keep her company while she writes. She visits school children who read her books often.

== Biography ==
=== Impact ===
With 59 books over a career that spans 35 years, her collection of short stories Green Was My Forest was selected as one of the ten best children's books written in Latin America during the 20th Century. Iturralde's influence has expanded beyond Ecuador. In the United States four of her books were chosen to be part of the Common Core kits in the schools in Los Angeles, California and Houston Texas. The Texas Library Association selected two of her bi-lingual books for its 2016-17 list of ten recommended bi-lingual books. Two of her books are part of the Required Summer Reading Books recommended by Scholastic Books. Three of her books have won the Skipping Stones International Book Prize and five of her books won the International Latino Book Award. In Mexico, three of her books were also chosen, in different years, by the SEP, the Mexican Secretariat of Public Education, to be part of all the school libraries in that country. Her book Verde fue mi selva (Green was my Forest), was selected as one of the ten "essential" books in the Latin-American List of Children and Young Adults Literature of the 20th Century by a panel of 27 experts from Latin American countries that was convoked by the SM Foundation and the Directorate of Libraries, Archives and Museums of Chile. (Fundación SM y la Dirección de Bibliotecas, Archivos y Museos de Chile (DIBAM)). These are substantial achievements for a writer who comes from a small country where opportunities to be known internationally are relatively few.

=== Childhood and young adulthood ===
Edna Iturralde's early childhood years laid the foundation for her literary career. Her aviator father died in a plane crash when she was one, and she was raised as a single child. Her maternal grandfather told her stories and her mother read to her, but without siblings, her imagination developed as she amused herself by telling stories to her dolls and dogs, and day-dreaming on garden swings. In fifth grade her class was selected to present a play at the school assembly and no appropriate play could be found, so Edna went home, sat down, and wrote one. Her teacher approved, the play was given and Edna realized how much she loved writing. From then on her dream was to become a writer when she grew up. Classmates asked her to write stories for them on topics they chose; the birth of a new baby brother or sister, a trip to the mountains, the death of a beloved pet and many other themes that were important in their lives. She also wrote in the school newspaper and was part of the Oratory Club. In 1967, she became the first girl to win Ecuador's Presidential National Award for Oratory and the first girl to win the oratory prize of the Municipality of Quito. University was not an option, and she still dreamed of writing, but she needed to work. As a tour guide for Metropolitan Touring in Ecuador, her stories so amused tourists that they voted her the best tour guide in South America of IntravTravel Group. She started a boutique by renting a room in an old house, which she painted and decorated herself. It was Quito's first boutique, called Carnaby Street. She sold, often on credit, the clothes and copper and silver jewelry she designed. She married at twenty-two to Diederick van Maasdijk and became the full-time mother of four children.

=== Early career ===
Marriage turned out to further her literary career, because since her children insisted she repeat her bedtime stories exactly the same way every time she had to write them down. So when Panorama, a supplement of the Quito newspaper El Comercio, solicited children's' stories, she sent in one of hers. Not only did Panorama choose her story, but also asked her to provide it a story every week. After one year of writing for Panorama (1980–1981), Edna founded La Cometa (The Kite) in 1982. That same year, her husband died in a plane crash. Edna continued writing La Cometa, the first weekly children's magazine to be published in Ecuador. For the next eleven years (1982–1993), she produced La Cometa every week (with the assistance of only a secretary, an artist, and a pet squirrel), filling its 16 pages only with her own stories, serial novels, comics and games. She signed many of them with a pseudonym to make people think the magazine had a larger staff. La Cometa was distributed for free with the newspaper Diario Hoy, considerably increasing its circulation, and reached about 210,000 children weekly. Many of these children lacked money to buy books but learned the pleasure of reading from La Cometa. La Cometa provided a model for several other free South American children's magazines.

In 1985 she married Bruce Kernan and had two more children.

=== Growth as an author and communicator ===
In 1993, commissioned by the United Nations Children's Emergency Fund (UNICEF) and the Ecuadorian Ministry of Education to write about values children should learn, Iturralde wrote the 60 amusing stories in the three volumes of ‘'To Be and To Share'’, for three different age groups. She also was a consultant of PLAN International, for which she wrote a humoristic but useful book on social relations. From 1996 to 1998, she was the representative in Ecuador of Educational Development Center (EDC). She used the Interactive Radio Instruction Method to write, produce and test 15 free distance education programs entitled "Let’s Play Theatre". The program guides preschool teachers, or care givers, during 20 minutes sessions, in developing emotional intelligence and conflict resolution by appealing to the imagination of young children. Many Ecuadorian daycare centers have used it successfully. In 1996, Edna founded the Union of Writers of Literature for Children (UDELI), with the idea of helping writers of children and young adult literature to publish. The international publishing houses which were operating in Ecuador at the time only commercialized children books from Hispanic writers or translations from other languages. The association published an anthology of Christmas stories, enabling new writers and illustrators to gain exposure and giving impetus to children's literature in Ecuador.

In 1998 Editorial Santillana, followed by Editorial Norma, the two most important international publishing houses in Ecuador, selected Iturralde's literature for publication. Until then, foreign titles completely dominated children and adolescent literature within Ecuador and most writers had to publish their own work. The success of Iturralde's books Verde fue mi Selva and Y su corazón escapó para convertirse en pájaro encouraged these publishers to look into publishing more children's literature by Ecuadorian authors. Since then Edna Iturralde has continued to publish with Santillana, Norma and also with Editorial SM, and Penguin Random House, Colombia. She has published 59 books between picture books, novels, chapter books, and collections of short stories in Colombia, Mexico, Spain and the United States.

From 2000 to 2002 Iturralde taught a course on Creative Writing at the Universidad San Francisco de Quito in the International Program. In early 2016 she started writing a weekly column for Family Magazine, a supplement to El Comercio newspaper.

=== Influence on literature in Ecuador and beyond ===
In 2006 Edna founded and became the first president of the Ecuadorean affiliate of the Latin-American Academy of Children and Young Adults Literature. She was its president until 2012. The literary congresses she organized in Ecuador served to draw international attention and appreciation of Ecuadorean children and young adults literature. Edna has forcefully contributed to promoting reading and raising appreciation of children and young adult literature in Ecuador. The Hoy en la Educación Foundation named its annual literary contest after her. She only asked it give its award to new, unpublished authors of children and young adult literature, since she wanted to encourage them. She has presented and discussed her literature in hundreds of visits to schools and dozens of radio, television, newspaper and magazine interviews. Her literature has become part of the curriculum of Children's Literature studies at several Ecuadorian universities such as Universidad Tecnica Particular de Loja (UTPL) Pontificia Universidad Católica del Ecuador (PUCE), Universidad de Cuenca Ecuador, Universidad Técnica de Machala, Universidad Central del Ecuador, Universidad Andina Simón Bolívar, Universidad Tecnológica del Equinoccial (UTE). Her books have been used as the basis for plays, ballets. The National Symphony Orchestra commissioned an orchestral piece based on one of her books, Los hijos de la Guacamaya. Her numerous awards (e.g. 2013 Woman of the Year for Literature; 2014 Manuela Saenz Libertadora del Libertador Gold Medal; 2010 Silver Rose Award for the Woman of the Year; 2007 Essential Women in Ecuador) have enormously raised the awareness in Ecuador of the beneficial role of literature for the development of children and young adults.

Dr. Jaime García Padrino, professor of Children's and Young Adult Literature at the Universidad Complutense de Madrid, has summarized Edna's contribution to children and young adult literature:

“… Iturralde’s contribution to Children’s Literature and Young Adult Literature is today one of the most outstanding in Ecuador and, by extension, in Latin America. This is due to both the number of works she has published to date and the variety of themes about which she has written. Her historical and biographical books are notable for their solid documentation and rigorous accuracy. Above all, her writing is of high expressive quality. There is no doubt that Edna Iturralde has made a significant, diverse and substantial contribution to Spanish-American Children’s and Young Adult Literature. She has drawn conspicuous attention to Ecuador, highlighting through her literature its cultural contributions to the world. Due to her keen ability to see the world through their eyes, Iturralde has successfully reached children and young adults. Her works are contributing to the creating a new generation of readers who are sensitive, tolerant and caring human beings."

In 2025 she was nominated for the Hans Christian Andersen Award as recognition for her works and their lasting contribution to children's literature, becoming the first ecuadorian woman to be nominated for this prize.

== Work ==
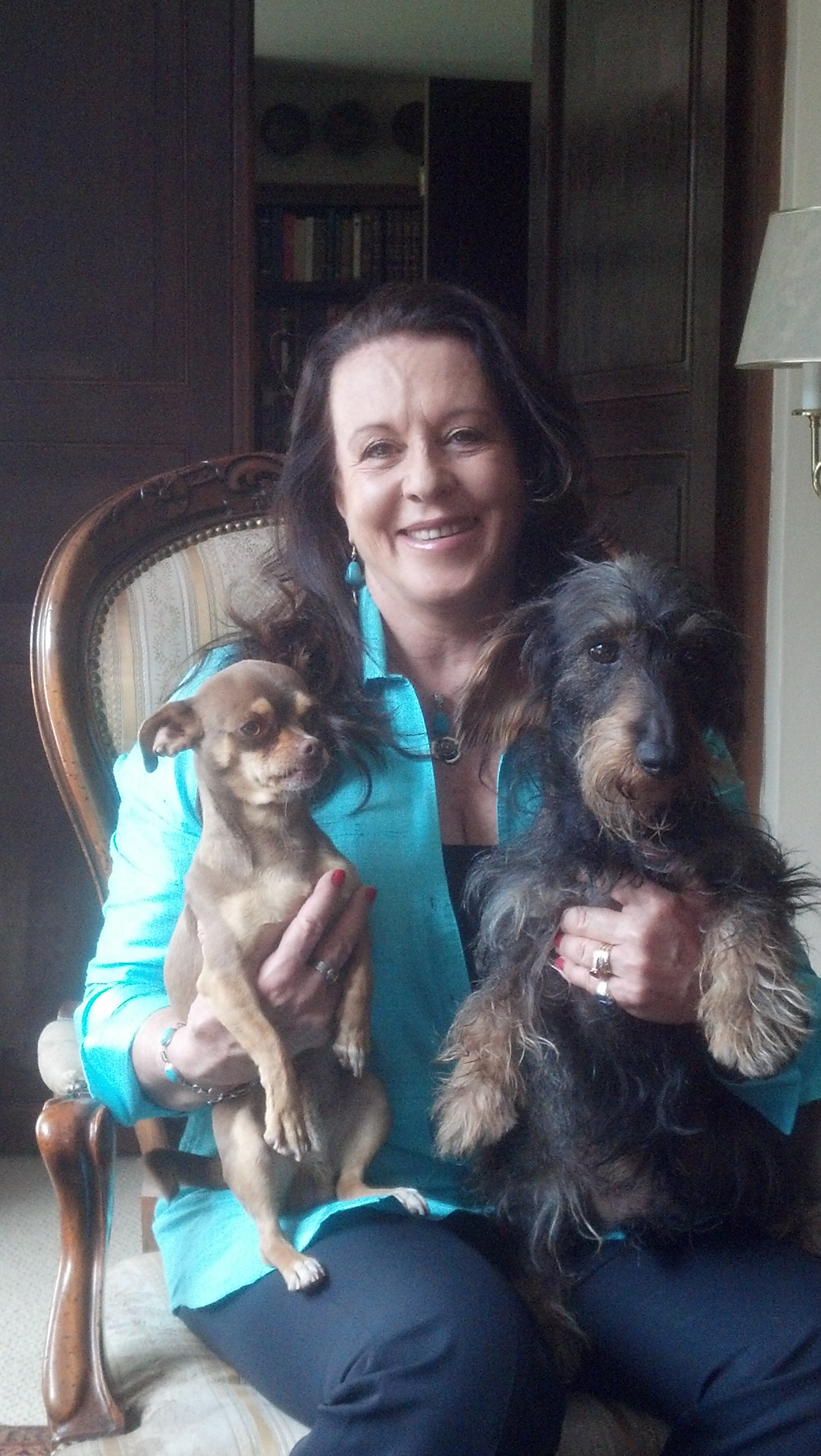

Iturralde's literature develops within a multicultural, ethnic, and social context. In an epoch when local and regional histories are being obliterated, and when few people are concerned with the special knowledge that has been preserved by certain local ethnic groups, a voice that weaves together fictional and ingenuous stories, based though they are on serious research, and through such fiction documents and projects such knowledge, is somewhat transcendental in the eyes of many. Iturralde removes the veils from the identity that is unknown or forgotten and projects it to the rest of the world.

Iturralde is considered one of the most important and prolific figures of Ecuadorian children and juvenile literature. Mother of six children, she has dedicated much of her life to writing for children. Her books have been published in Colombia, Mexico, and Spain and are distributed in the United States, Peru, and Bolivia. Iturralde was the founder and director of the children's magazine La Cometa ("The Kite"), which for fifteen years was published together with the newspaper, Hoy, from Ecuador. She has published fifty eight books concerning a variety of themes, but for the last few years, she has concentrated on narratives based on ethnicity, and she is the pioneer in this genre in the children's literature of Ecuador. She has given lectures on creative writing at the University of San Francisco de Quito in the International Program.

She has won various prizes and nominations within and outside her country. Among the most important of these are the Ecuador National Prize for Children's Literature Dario Guevara Mavorga in Ecuador in 2001, the Skipping Stones Award in the

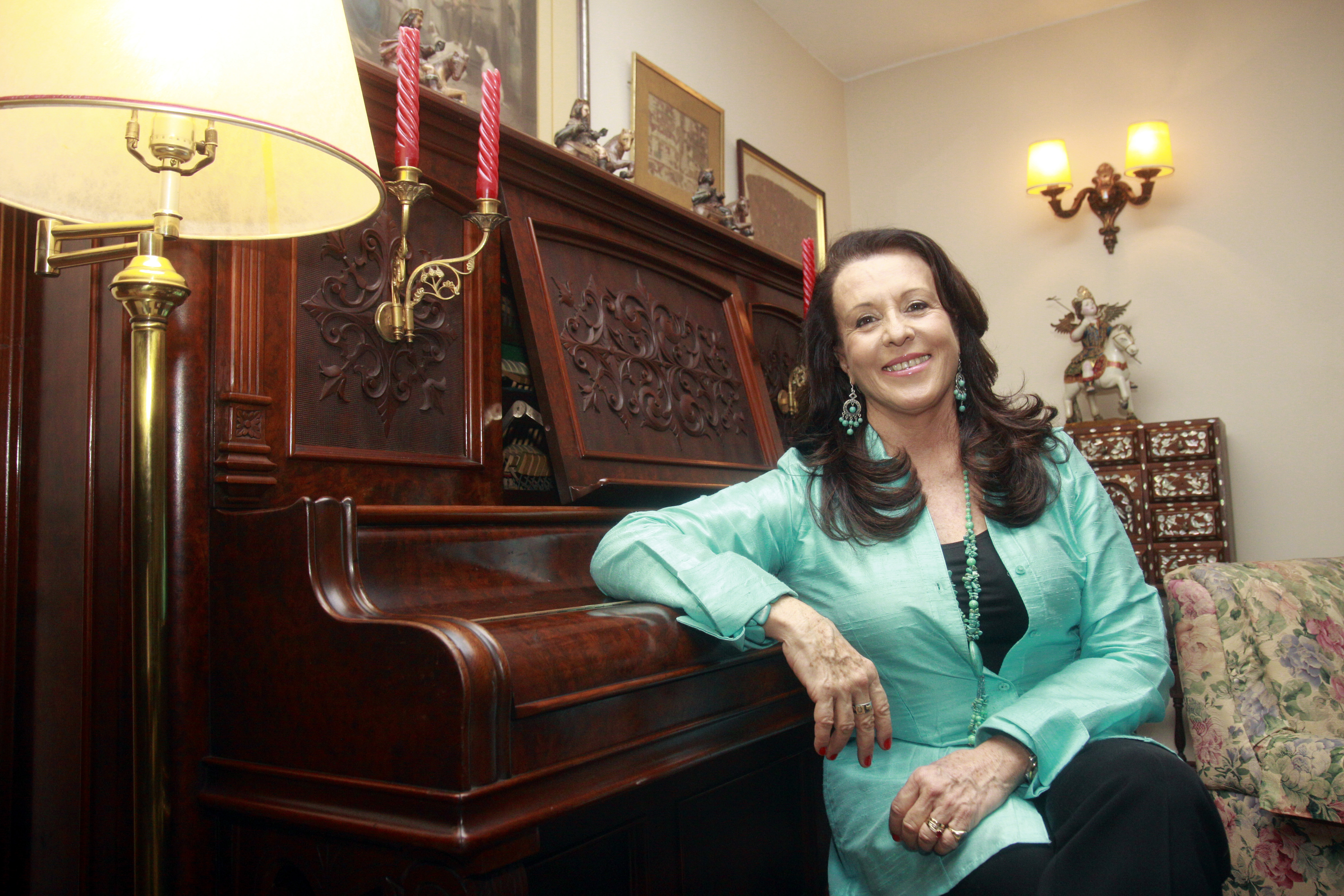
¡xito!

United States in 2002 and 2005, and the Mention of Honor of the Municipality of Quito in 2003 and 2004. She has been nominated twice, in 2012 and 2013, to the Astrid Lindgren Memorial Award (ALMA). As Her work was selected by the SEP within the competition of the Mexican Ministry of Education in 2003 and 2005. In 2005, two of her books were nominated for the Ecuadorian Honor List of IBBY (International Board of Books for the Young). She is the president of the Ecuadorian Academy of Children and Juvenile Literature, which is associated with the Latin American Academy of Children and Juvenile Literature.
