= María Augusta Calle =

Ecuadorian journalist, politician and ambassador

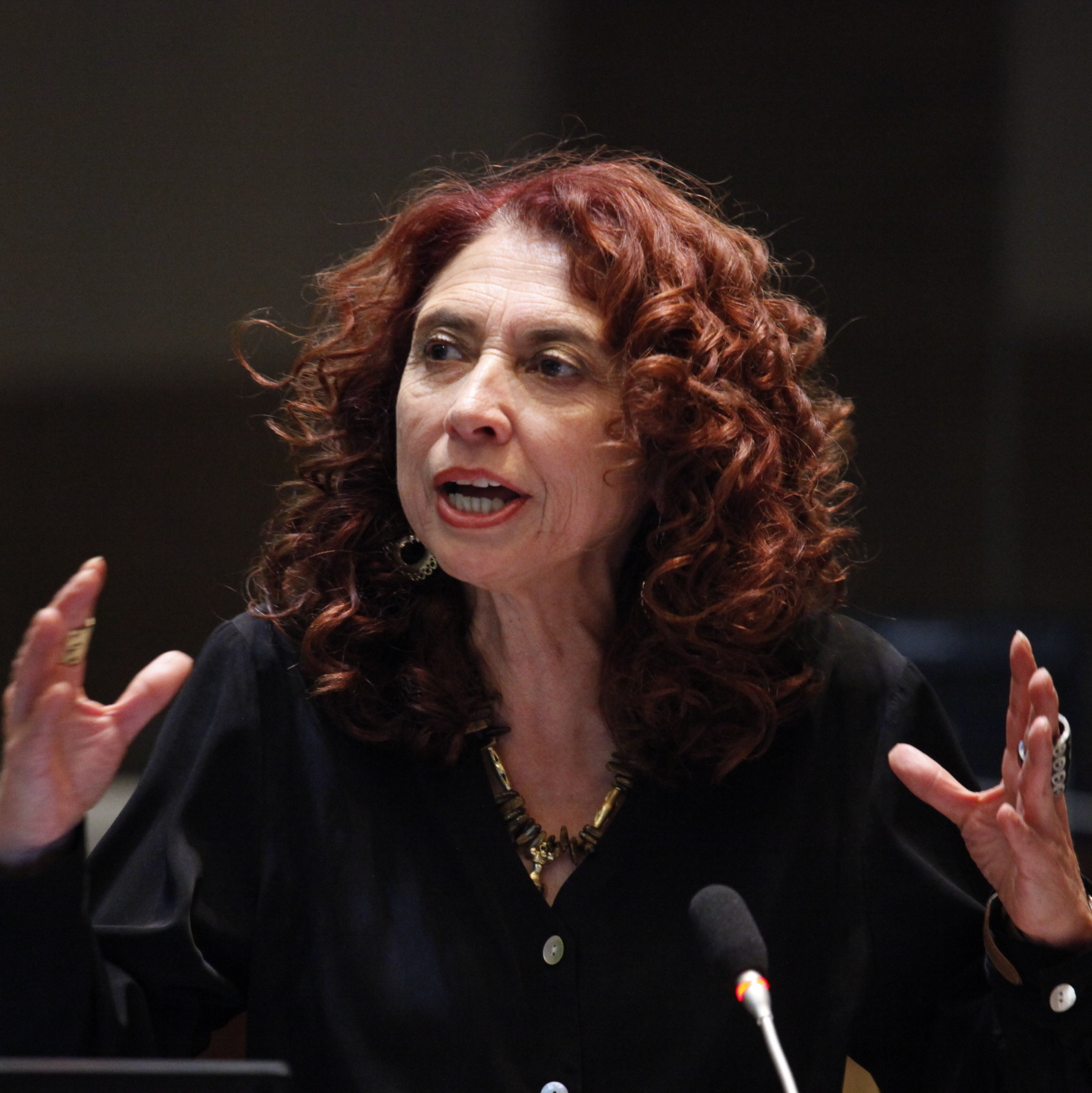
- Assembly member Calle intervenes in 2015
- Born: 1953 (age 72–73); Quito
- Occupations: journalist, politician and ambassador
- Known for: Ambassador to Cuba
- Political party: Alianza PAIS

Maria Augusta Calle (born 1953) is an Ecuadorian journalist, politician and ambassador. She has been a member of the National Assembly representing the province of Pichincha for the Alianza PAIS movement. She was the head of operations in Ecuador for the Venezuelan government television propaganda network Telesur. In 2017 she was appointed Ecuador's ambassador to Cuba.

== Life ==
Calle was born in Quito in 1953.

President Rafael Correa noticed that Calle spoke in support of the government's idea of a Constituent Assembly when she visited the Palacio de Carondelet. After this she joined the Alianza PAIS party and she was identified as a prospective assembly member. When the Constituent Assembly was installed in December 2007, she was appointed president of the Latin American Sovereignty and Integration table with Gabriela Quezada as her deputy. As part of this work it was proposed that Ecuador should take control of Manta Military Base (that had been a military base of the United States). She said that in revenge for this she was accused of allowing her bank account to be used by the FARC leader Raúl Reyes in 2006.

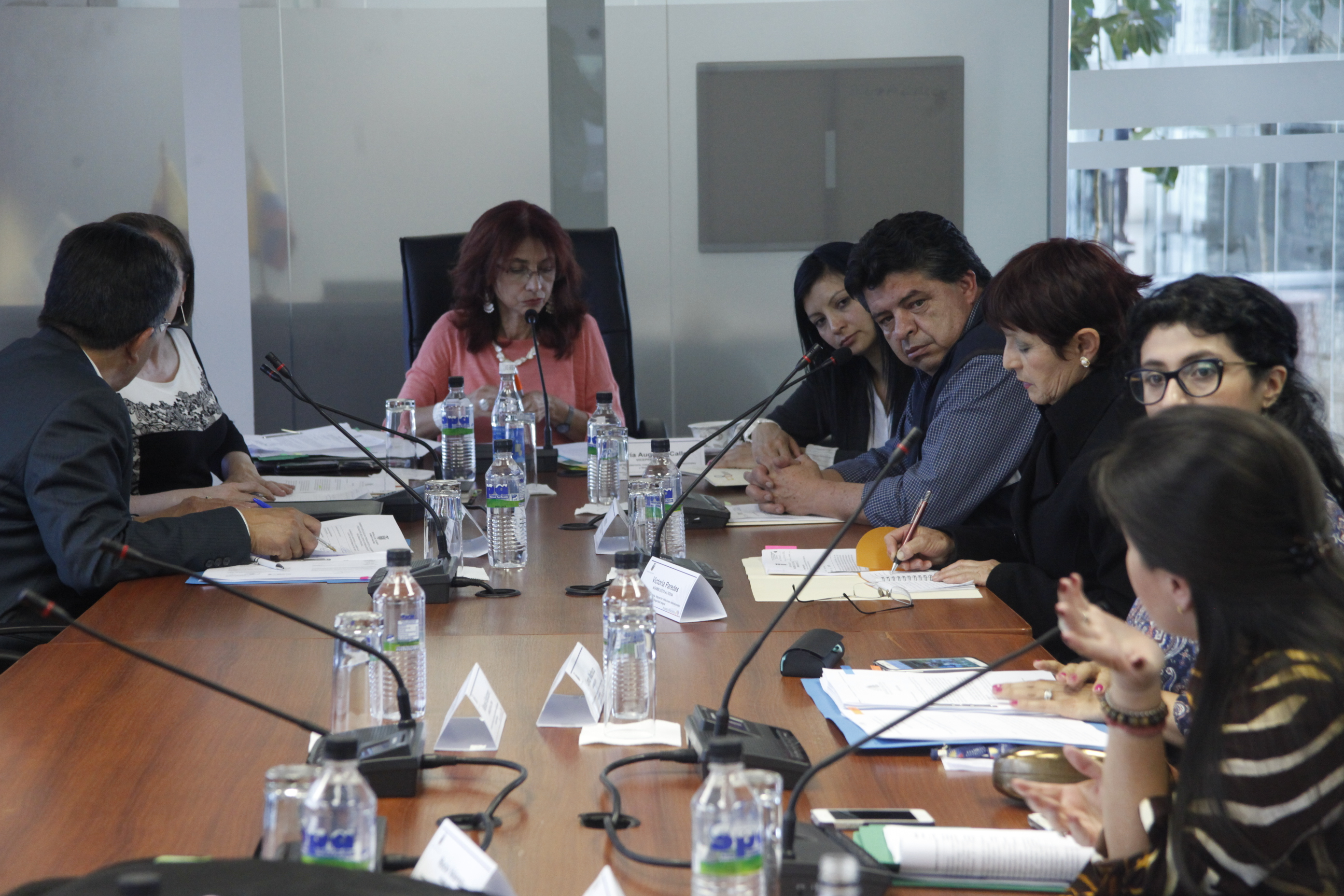
Discussing Minamata convention on Mercury in 2015 chaired by Calle

Calle was elected as an assembly member for the province of Pichincha Province in 2009 and re-elected in 2013. She attracted attention during her second term when she championed the idea that "media lynching" should be added to the Penal Code. She proposed that the crime would be punishable with a sentence of one to three years during debates at the National Assembly.

In 2017 she was appointed Ecuador's ambassador to Cuba by President Lenín Moreno, becoming the first woman to hold that position. She held the position until June 2019.

In 2021 there was a story concerning Calle's accusation that the Ministry of Health had included her as someone who had been vaccinated against COVID-19 in their statistics. However she knew that this was wrong as she was out of the country. She believed that this had swelled the figures, however she was told that the count was made of people being scheduled to have a vaccination. It was agreed that it was a misunderstanding.
