= Inter-American Academy of Guayaquil =

InterAmerican Academy

Location
- Puerto Azul km. 10.5 Via a la Costa; Guayaquil; Ecuador
- Coordinates: 2.1870053°S 79.96419409999999°W

Information
- Type: American international school
- Grades: PreK-12
- Website: interamerican.edu.ec

InterAmerican Academy of Guayaquil (IAA) is an American International school in Guayaquil, Guayas, Ecuador, serving two years (nursery level) through grade 12.

Students graduating from IAA receive an American High diploma and are able to apply to the best universities in the United States, Canada, and Europe.

== Model United Nation (MUN) ==
Model United Nations (MUN) emerged as a teaching methodology at the University of Harvard in 1948. It is a simulation system of the United Nations, involving students at a university level.

Students represent various diplomatic countries of the United Nations, for which they are trained in topics such as culture, domestic, foreign policy, economy and society, to discuss real issues of national and international interest in the bodies and committees of the UN. The MUN is an educational and cultural event class, which not only promotes the growth and academic training of students, but also facilitates the development of skills such as public speaking, rhetoric and negotiation, which are useful in the personal and professional lives of those involved.

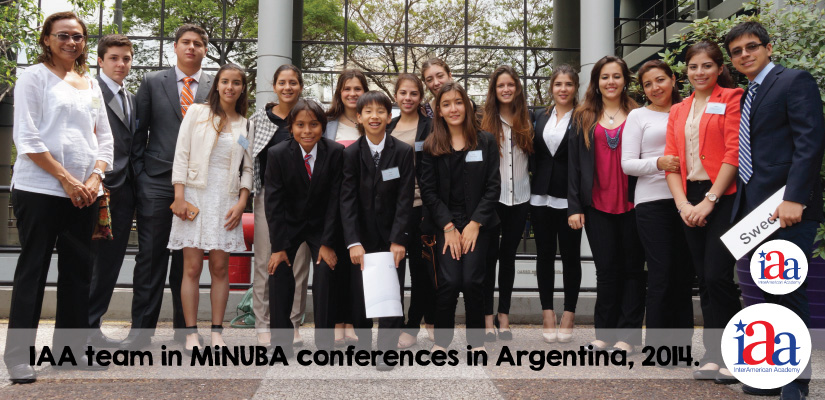
IAA students in MUN

InterAmerican Academy is the first school in Guayaquil that has implemented this methodology, and has been participating in the MUN international conferences since 1998.

== Stuco ==
The Academy Student Council (Stuco) includes a president, vice-president, secretary, treasurer, and class representatives from 6-12 grade students. Its purpose is to develop democratic ideals, teach respect for law and order, maintain high standards for cooperation, loyalty and school spirit, prepare for adult life and citizenship, and encourage all worthwhile activities in school. Stuco promotes activities throughout the school year for the middle and high school including a lock-in, prom night, movie night, casino night, pep rallies, and sports day.
