= Quinsaloma Canton =

- Canton
- Location of Los Rios Province in Ecuador.

- Quinsaloma Canton in Los Ríos Province
- Coordinates: 1.2062°S 79.3145°W
- Country: Ecuador
- Province: Los Ríos Province
- Time zone: UTC-5 (ECT)

Quinsaloma Canton is a canton of Ecuador, located in the Los Ríos Province. Its capital is the town of Quinsaloma.

== Demographics ==
Ethnic groups as of the Ecuadorian census of 2010:

- Mestizo 69.8%
- Montubio 19.7%
- Afro-Ecuadorian 5.2%
- White 4.3%
- Indigenous 0.8%
- Other 0.3%
