= Luis Gallegos =

Ecuadorian diplomat

Luis Benigno Gallegos Chiriboga

Ecuadorian Minister of Foreign Affairs
- In office July 2020 – March 2021
- Preceded by: José Valencia Amores
- Succeeded by: Manuel Mejía Dalmau

Ecuador Ambassador to United Nations in New York
- In office October 2018 – July 2020

Ecuador Ambassador to the United States
- In office 2005–2011
- Succeeded by: Nathalie Cely

Personal details
- Born: December 13, 1946 (age 79) Quito, Ecuador
- Spouse: Fabiola Jaramillo Almeida de Gallegos
- Children: Maria Cristina Gallegos Jaramillo; Jorge Luis Gallegos Jaramillo
- Education: Central University of Ecuador
- Profession: Diplomat

Luis Gallegos Chiriboga (born 13 December 1946), is an Ecuadorian diplomat. He was the Minister of Foreign Affairs of Ecuador since July 2020 until March 2021, appointed by president Lenín Moreno.

He was the Ambassador Extraordinary and Plenipotentiary, Permanent Representative of Ecuador to the United Nations in New York. He was a Member of the BOT of UNITAR, appointed by the UN Secretary-General as of 1 July 2019. Gallegos served as the Permanent Representative of Ecuador to the United Nations in Geneva three times. He was a member of the UN Committee against Torture. He is the Chairman of the Global UN Partnership for Inclusive Information and Communication Technologies, Chairman of the Advisory Board of the Institute of Public Policy and Disability at American University and of the Universal Design Commission. In addition, Gallegos is a board member for the Special Olympics.

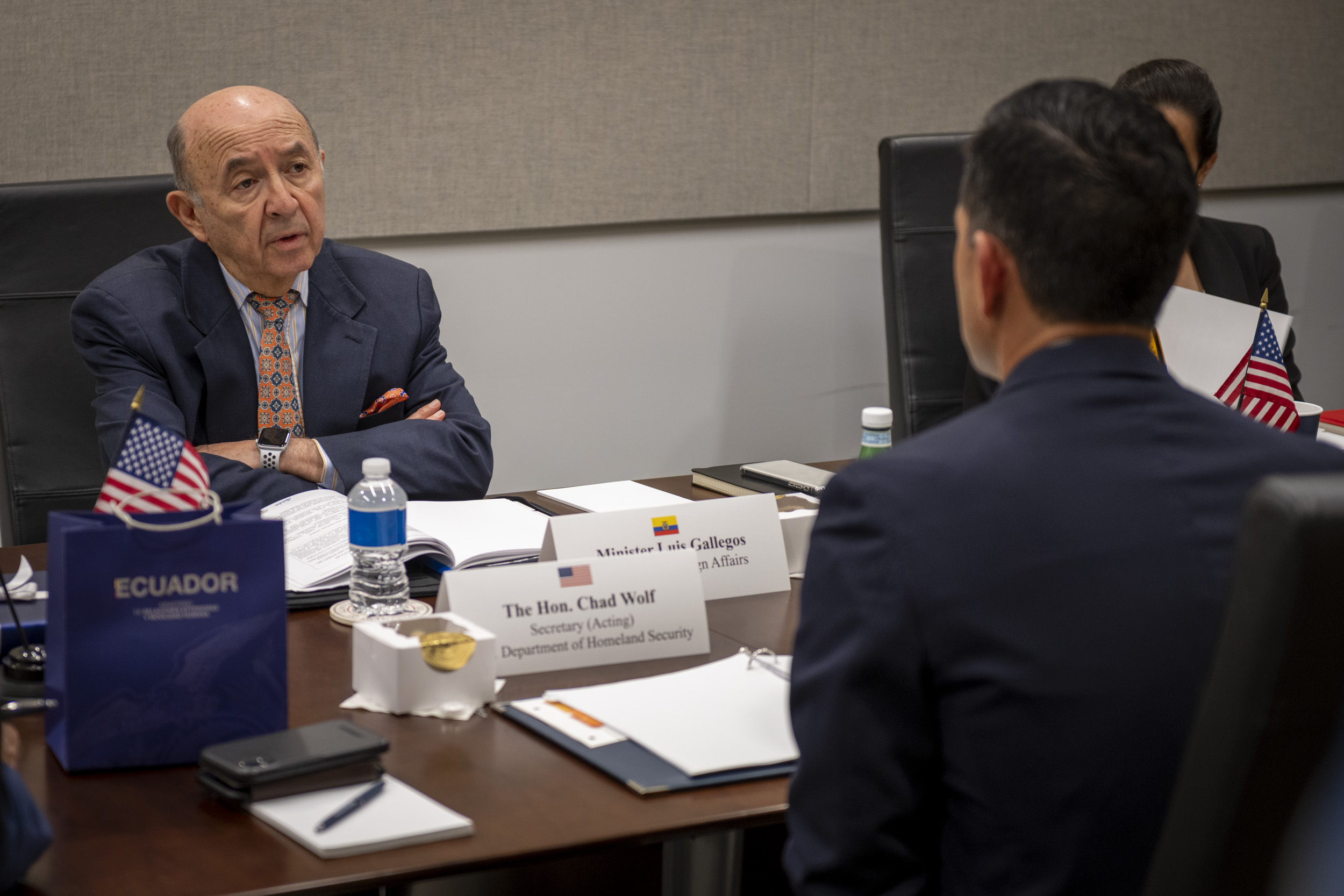
Gallegos meets with Acting U.S. Homeland Security Secretary Chad Wolf meets to discuss strengthening the bilateral relationship between Ecuador and United States.

Prior to his appointment to the United Nations, Gallegos served as Ecuador's Ambassador to the United States from 2005 to 2011.

Over the course of his career, Gallegos served as Ecuador's Head of Mission to Bulgaria from 1985 to 1989; Ambassador to El Salvador from 1994 to 1997; Permanent Representative to the United Nations in Geneve three times; Permanent Representative to the United Nations in New York three times as well, and Ambassador to Australia, among other positions held.

Gallegos earned his bachelor's degree in Social and Political Science, and a master of arts degree in political science from Tufts University's Fletcher School of Law and Diplomacy. In addition, he holds a Doctor of Law degree from the Central University of Ecuador. He speaks English, French, and Spanish, and has two children with his wife Fabiola Jaramillo Almeida de Gallegos.
