= Embassy of Ecuador, Washington, D.C. =

Embassy of Ecuador
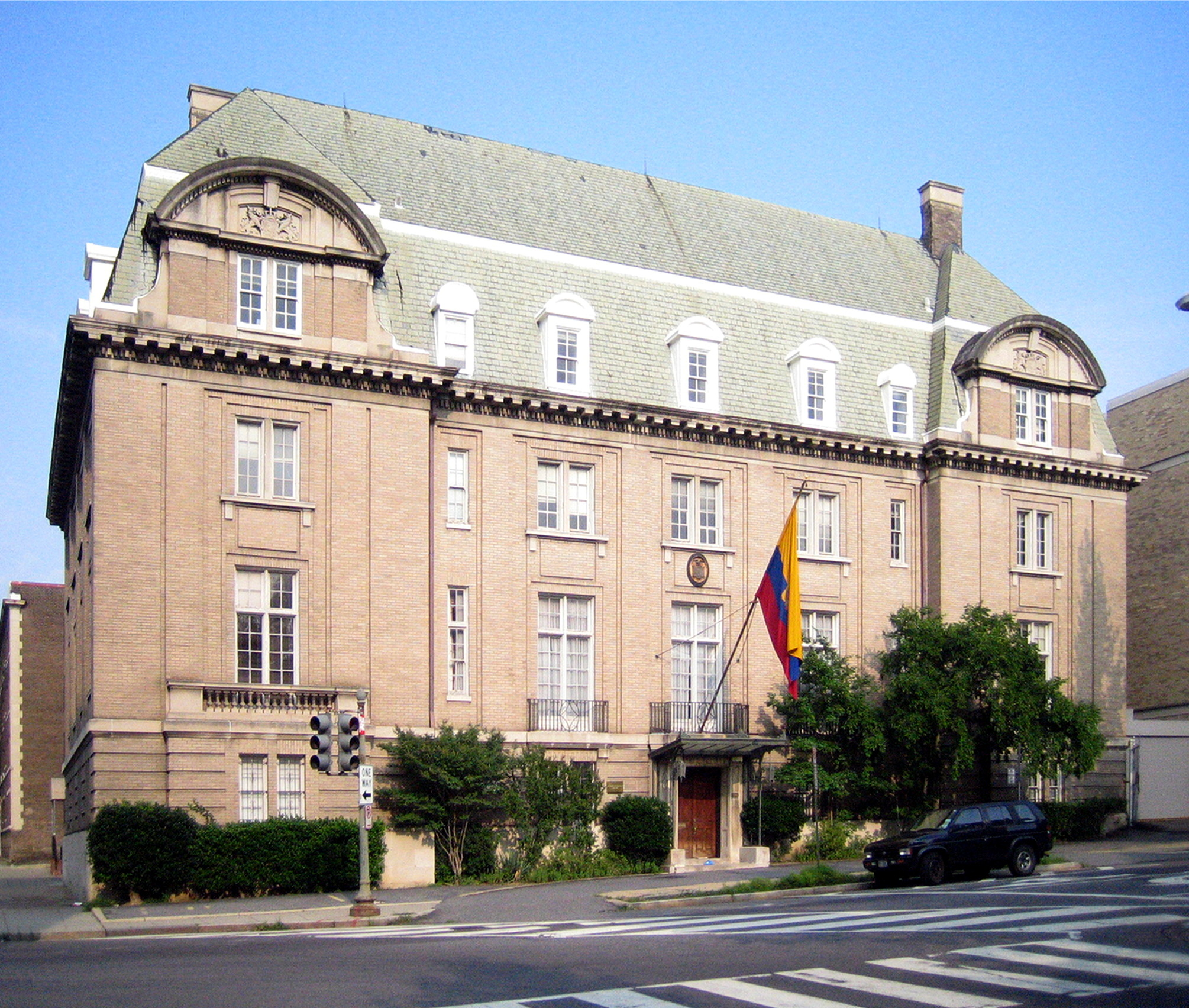
- Location: Washington, D.C.
- Address: 2535 15th Street, N.W.
- Coordinates: 38°55′23″N 77°2′5″W
- Ambassador: Pablo Zambrano Albuja
- Website: https://www.cancilleria.gob.ec/washington/

The Embassy of Ecuador in Washington, D.C., is the Republic of Ecuador's diplomatic mission to the United States. It is located at 2535 15th Street N.W. in Washington, D.C.'s Meridian Hill neighborhood. The current building has been used as an embassy since the 1960s.

The building was designed by architect George Oakley Totten Jr. (1866-1939), who studied at the Ecole des Beaux-Arts and who also designed the Old Hungarian Embassy building next door at 2537 Fifteenth St.

The embassy also operates Consulates-General in Atlanta, Chicago, Houston, Long Island City, Los Angeles, Miami, Minneapolis, New Haven, New York City, Newark and Phoenix.

The chancery suffered damage in the 2011 Virginia earthquake on August 24, 2011. The earthquake caused cracks on internal walls and collapsed three of the building's chimneys. The chimney collapse damaged two cars.

On September 27, 2017, a two alarm fire broke out on the roof of the chancery.

Following the 2017 fire, the building underwent a $3.5 million structural and interior restoration to repair extensive fire and water damage. The multi-year project included replacing the custom slate roof, updating building systems, and reconstructing the historic ornamental plaster work in the grand ballroom, allowing the chancery to successfully return to full operations by 2026.

== See also ==
- List of diplomatic missions in Washington, D.C.
