= Ministry of Justice (Ecuador) =

The Ministry of Justice, Human Rights and Cults of Ecuador is the State portfolio in charge of justice in Ecuador. It was created on November 15, 2007, during the presidency of Rafael Correa. The Ministry was created in view of the need for a "coordinated and joint work of all justice operators, whose objective is to optimize the plans and projects of the judicial function, the Public Ministry, the Social Rehabilitation Directorate and other institutions related to the justice system." Its purpose, according to its official site, having achieved "the full observance of human rights" by 2017.

== List of ministers ==
- Gustavo Jalkh (2007–2009)
- Néstor Arbito Chica (2009–2010)
- José Serrano Salgado (2010–2011)
- Johana Pesántez (2011–2013)
- Lenin Lara (2013)
- Ledy Zúñiga Rocha (2014–2017) [1st female]
- Rosana Alvarado (2017–2021)
- Bernarda Ordoñez Moscoso (2021–2022)
- Paola Flores Jaramillo (2022–2023)
- Arianna Tanca Macchiavello (2023-)

== See also ==
- Ministry of justice
- Ministerio de Justicia (Ecuador) [Ministry of Justice (Ecuador)]
- Politics of Ecuador
