= Soledad Buendía =

Ecuadorian politician

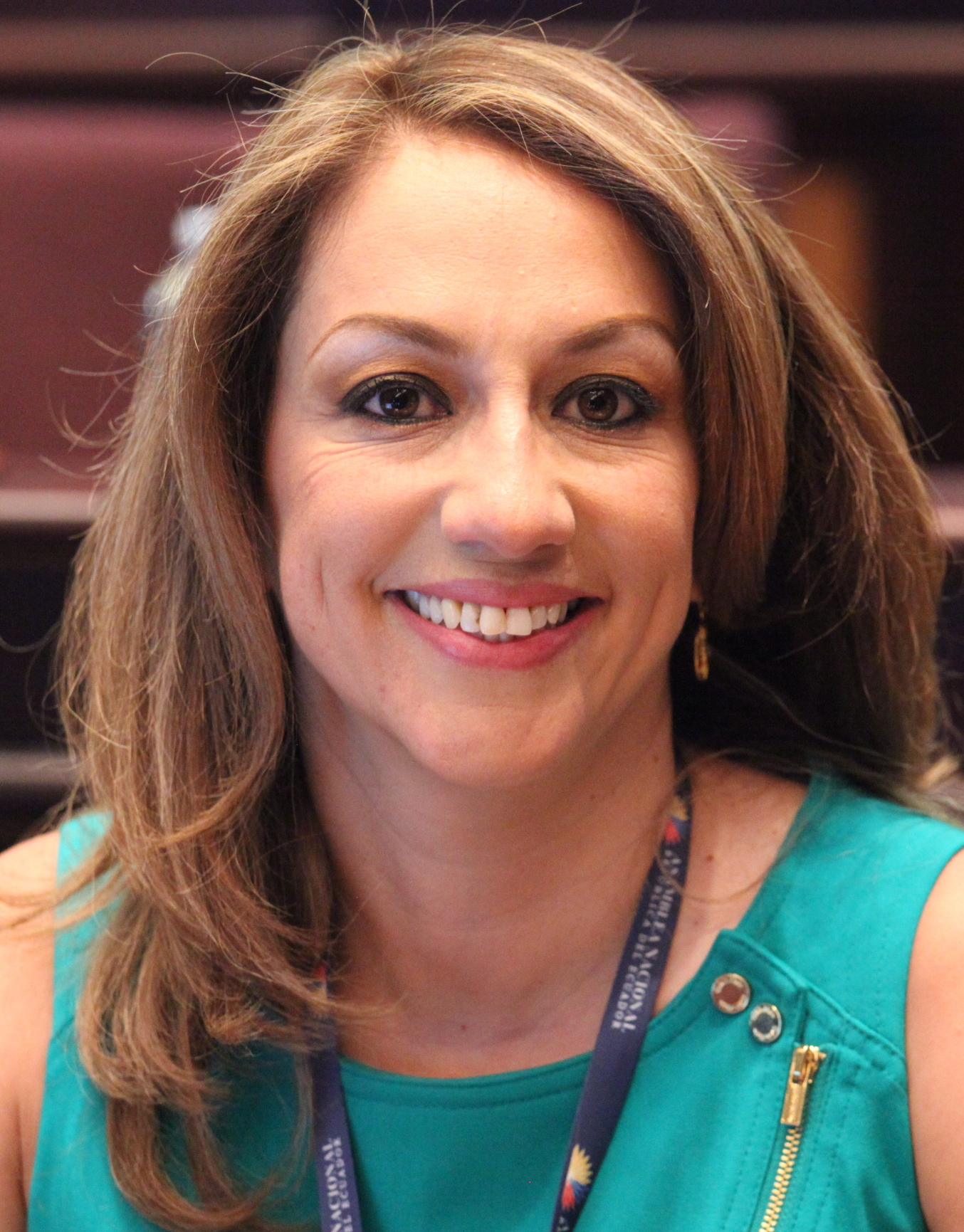

National Assembly of Ecuador
- Incumbent
- Assumed office 14 May 2013

Personal details
- Born: María Soledad Buendía Herdoiza Quito, Ecuador
- Party: PAIS Alliance
- Spouse: Edwin Jarrin
- Education: Latin American Social Sciences Institute
- Occupation: Politician
- Website: http://www.solbuendia.com

María Soledad Buendía Herdoiza is an Ecuadorian politician who currently serves in the National Assembly of Ecuador as a member of the PAIS Alliance, where she has served since 2013.

== Life ==
Born in Quito, she studied Political Science at the Latin American Social Sciences Institute with a specialization in Governance and Political Management, and while there began to work as a human rights activist. She also served as a consultant for the United Nations Development Fund for Women, and was an active member of The Citizens' Revolution.

In 2012, Buendía was nominated to the position of Coordinating Minister of Politics, replacing Betty Tola who had temporarily resigned. In the 2013 elections, Buendía was elected to the National Assembly, and was re-elected in 2017 elections. In her first year, she was sanctioned after going against the government and supporting assembly members Paola Pabón and Gina Godoy in a motion to decriminalize abortion in cases of rape in the country. She also spoke out against sexism in Ecuadorian publications. In the instance of Diario Extra, she filed a complaint and pushed for sanctions on the newspaper due to the publication of a "Lunes Sexi" segment, which she found to be demeaning to women.

In her second term of office on the National Assembly, Buendía has spoken out in favor of Jorge Glas during his suspension from the Vice Presidency.
