= Gabriela Rivadeneira =

Ecuadorian politician

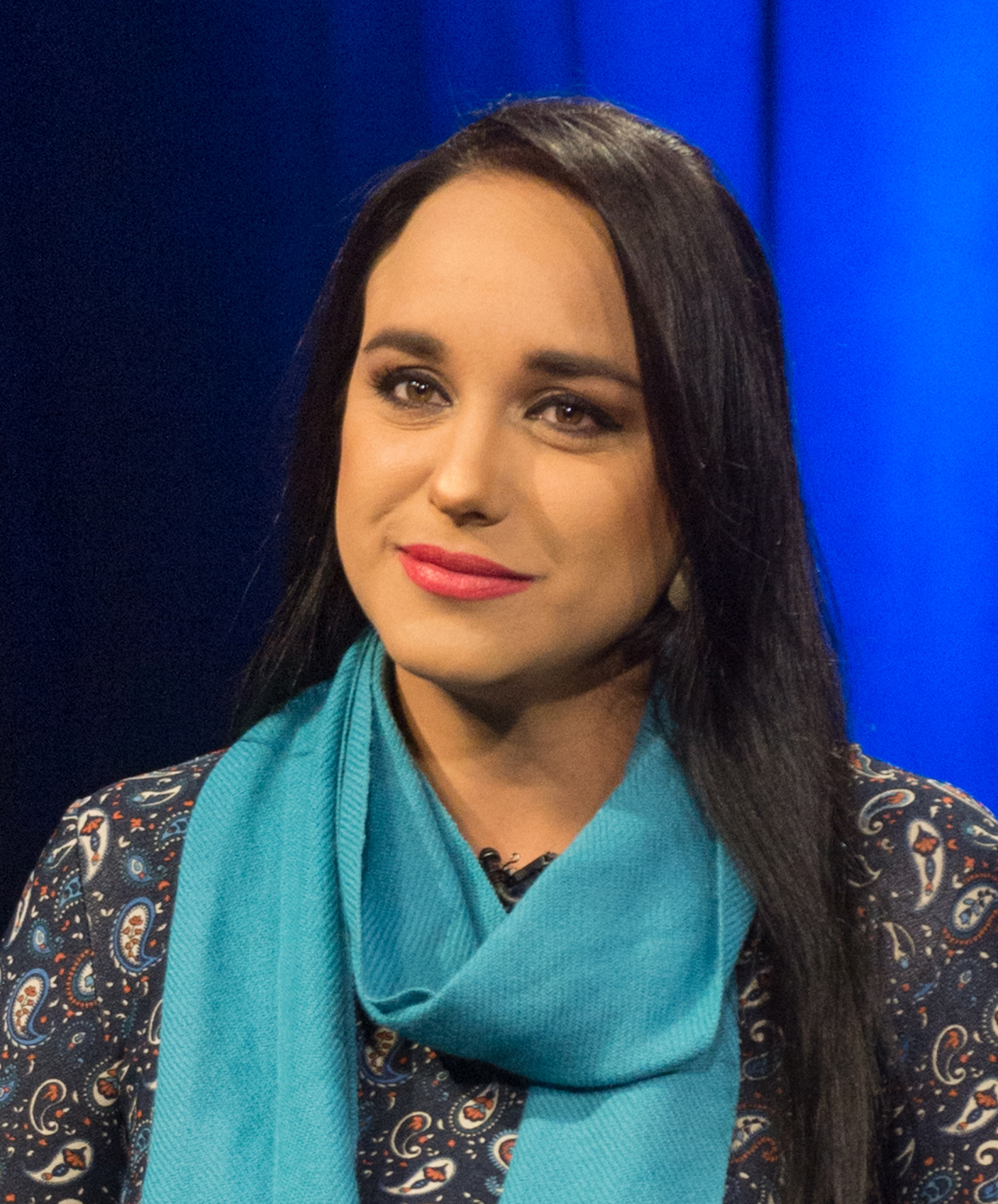
- Rivadeneira in 2017

President of the Citizen Revolution Movement
- Incumbent
- Assumed office 18 January 2026
- General Secretary: Evelyn Zambrano
- Preceded by: Luisa González

President of the National Assembly
- In office 14 May 2013 – 14 May 2017
- Preceded by: Fernando Cordero Cueva
- Succeeded by: José Serrano

Member of the National Assembly for the National Constituency
- In office 14 May 2013 – 14 May 2021

Governor of Imbabura Province
- In office 28 July 2011 – 9 November 2012
- President: Rafael Correa
- Preceded by: Pedro Dávila
- Succeeded by: Marcelo Villamarín

Vice Prefect of Imbabura Province
- In office 31 August 2009 – 27 July 2011
- President: Rafael Correa

Personal details
- Born: 25 July 1983 (age 43) Quito, Ecuador
- Party: PAIS Alliance (Before 2018) Citizen Revolution Movement (After 2018)
- Website: gabrielarivadeneira.com

Gabriela Alejandra Rivadeneira Burbano (born 25 July 1983) is an Ecuadorian politician who has been the President of the Citizen Revolution Movement since 2026. She was President of the National Assembly of Ecuador between May 2013 and May 2017. Previously she was Governor of Imbabura Province from 2011 to 2012.

She was the executive secretary of the PAIS Alliance between 1 May 2017 and 2018. During the Correa-Moreno split within PAIS, she sided with the former, leaving the party and becoming one of the leaders of the Citizen Revolution Movement.

== Early life ==
Rivadeneira was born in Quito as the first of four children. At age five she moved to Otavalo. In 2000, when she was seventeen, she received the beauty pageant title of Reina del Yamor (English: Queen of Yamor). The popularity and local fame she gained with this achievement enabled her to be successful in local politics.

Rivadeneira went to the Colegio Santa Juana de Chantal. During her stay there she became president of the advice board and leader of the student board.

== Cultural activism ==
Rivadeneira founded the cultural organisation Mirarte in 1998, while she was fourteen years old. For her, it was a relief valve against the Ecuadorian government during those years. The organisation later produced the first children's film in Ecuador, Sara la Espantapájaros. Rivadeneira had a role in the movie. Rivadeneira has said that in her youth she sprayed graffiti for ideological goals as a protest against foreign debt, free-trade treaties and the presence of the U.S. Manta Air Base at Eloy Alfaro International Airport.

== Political career ==
Rivadeneira started her political career as councilwoman for the municipality of Otavalo; she served in this capacity between 2004 and 2008. During that time she won the elections in 2004 and 2008. From 2004 till 2006 she was a member of the Pachakutik party. But in 2006 she left and became a member of a group that would later join forces with the PAIS Alliance. She was vice mayor of the city of Otavalo between 2006 and 2008. Between 2009 and 2011 she served as vice prefect of Imbabura Province. She also was a member of the national directory of PAIS Alliance between 2010 and 2012.

On 28 July 2011 Rivadeneira took up the function of governor of Imbabura Province after Governor Pedro Dávila laid down his function. In 2011 in the power struggle that saw Rafael Correa take over the leadership of the Alianza Pais party, a National board was created. Soliz was one of the 22 members of that board which included Irina Cabezas, Nancy Morocho, María Luisa Moreno, Dora Aguirre, Jorge Loor, Doris Soliz and Patricia Sarzoza. To take up this position Rivadeneira was forced to lay down her function of Vice Prefect in the same province. As Rivadeneira became governor at age 28 she became not only the first female governor of Imbabura Province, but also the youngest. Rivadeneira was chosen for this position by President Rafael Correa. On 9 November 2012 Rivadeneira resigned as governor, so she could run in the 2013 general election. In March 2013 she went to the funeral of Hugo Chávez as part of the Ecuadorian delegation.

=== National politics ===
Rivadeneira led the PAIS Alliance in the February 2013 elections for the National Assembly while more senior politicians were placed behind her on the national list. Examples of these were the then President of the National Assembly Fernando Cordero Cueva, the then Vice President of the National Assembly Juan Carlos Cassinelli and Rosana Alvarado. She personally received 3,498,379 votes. On 14 May 2013 Rivadeneira was chosen as President of the National Assembly after receiving 107 of 137 votes in her favor.

After being chosen as President of the National Assembly she was mentioned as a potential successor for President of Ecuador, Rafael Correa. Correa announced that he would not seek another term in the 2017 elections because of the country's term limits. Earlier, Correa had mentioned Rivadeneira as a possible successor while he was on a visit to Imbabura Province. Rivadeneira would not have been eligible, as she would not have reached the minimum age of 35 for the office of president.

Rivadeneira's role as president of Ecuador's National Assembly has sparked criticism. On 3 October 2013 Rivadeneira spoke in the Ecuadorian National Assembly and quoted the music group Quilapayún by saying "... we have to flip the tortilla so that the poor eat bread, and the rich eat shit". Her action was criticized by opposition MPs. Other examples include the warrant against legislator Cléver Jiménez, and the acquisition of a house for 250,000 U.S. dollars.

In May 2015 Rivadeneira was re-elected as President of the National Assembly. In February 2016 she became President of the Latin American Parliament. In July 2016, with other Latin American regimes in trouble, she defended the Socialism of the 21st century of Latin America, stating that it had not been broken.

Rivadeneira's public approval rate dropped from 45% in December 2013, to 26,5% in the end of 2016. On 15 February 2017 her office received a bomb threat when a CD package with explosives was delivered. In the 19 February 2017 elections Rivadeneira was re-elected as member of the National Assembly for the National Constituency. She was the most voted woman.

On 1 May 2017 she was elected the executive secretary of the PAIS Alliance. On 14 May 2017 she was succeeded as President of the National Assembly by José Serrano. In January 2018 the Electoral Dispute Court (Spanish: Tribunal Contencioso Electoral) stated that Rivadeneira was longer executive secretary of the PAIS Alliance.

During the Correa-Moreno split within PAIS, she sided with the former, leaving the party and becoming one of the leaders of the Citizen Revolution Movement. During the October 2019 Ecuadorian protests Rivadeneira sought refuge in the embassy of Mexico in Quito. On 9 January 2020 she moved to Mexico with her spouse and children.

In May 2022 she was still in exile in Mexico with outstanding charges against her in Ecuador.

== Personal life ==
Rivadeneira is married to writer Luis Flores and has two children. Rivadeneira has said that she is a frequent reader of Eduardo Galeano's work.
