= Paola Pabón =

Ecuadorian lawyer and politician (born 1978)

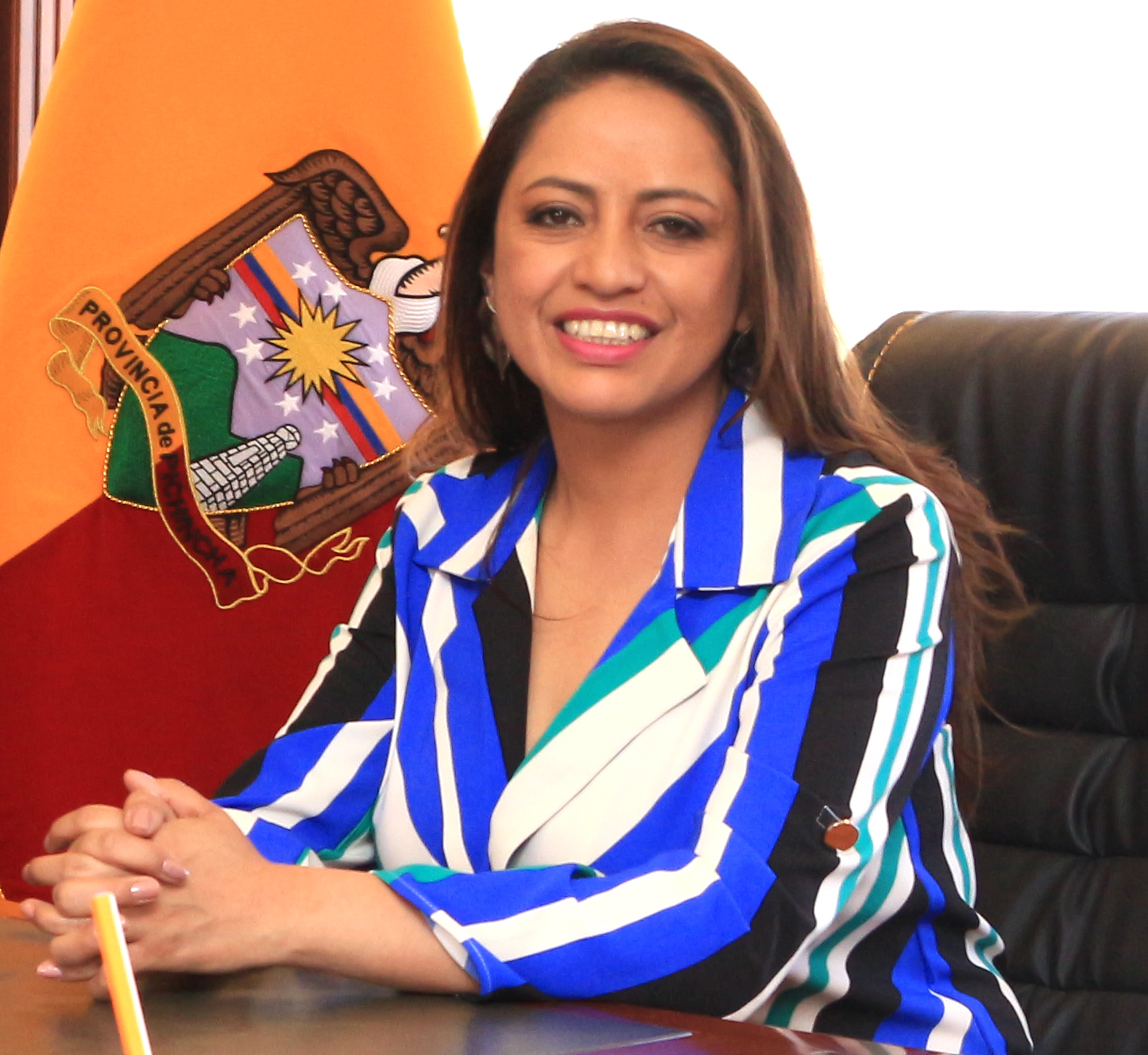
- Pabón in 2019

Prefect of Pichincha Province
- Incumbent
- Assumed office 14 May 2019
- Preceded by: Gustavo Baroja

Member of the National Assembly of Ecuador
- In office 31 July 2009 – 21 July 2015
- Constituency: Pichincha

Personal details
- Born: Paola Verenice Pabón Caranqui; January 28, 1978 (age 48) Ibarra, Ecuador
- Party: Democratic Left (1999–2006); PAIS Alliance (2006–2018); Citizen Revolution (since 2018)
- Occupation: Politician, lawyer

Paola Verenice Pabón Caranqui (born 28 January 1978) is an Ecuadorian lawyer, politician and feminist who ran for President of Ecuador in the 2025 general election. She has served as a representative to the National Assembly for the PAIS Alliance movement from 2009 and 2015 and has also worked under the presidencies of Rafael Correa and Lenin Moreno.

== Biography ==
Pabón was born on 28 January 1978 in Ibarra which is located in the Imbabura Province. She completed her higher education studies at the Central University of Ecuador and obtained a law degree. Pabón later went to the Rafael Landívar University in Guatemala where she earned a master's degree. She began her political career as a member of the Democratic Left Party where she remained for seven years. Pabón would eventually move to the PAIS Alliance movement, and it was when she was a member of the party that she was made its deputy director of their Quito branch. In the 2009 legislative elections, she was elected as a national assemblywoman and represented the Pichincha Province. and was re-elected to the position in the Ecuadorian general elections held four years later. During her time in the assembly, Pabón integrated the commission of autonomous governments in two periods of time.

She resigned her post on 21 July 2015 after she was appointed the Undersecretary of Political Management by President Rafael Correa. In January 2016, Pabón assumed the post of Secretariat of the Management Policy after the resignation of her predecessor, Viviana Bonilla. Her position was rectified by the new president Lenín Moreno in May 2017. However, three months later, Pabón resigned her position after showing against in what she perceived was a generalization on the part of Moreno in his criticism of his predecessor's administration for alleged acts of corruption. On 24 March 2019 she was elected Prefect of the Pichincha Province in the sectional elections of Ecuador.

In June 2024, Pabón registered to run for the Citizen Revolution Movement presidential nomination in the upcoming 2025 general election. She ended her campaign two months later in early August to support Luisa González.

== Controversy ==
In October 2013, Pabón and fellow congresswoman Gina Godoy presented a motion to discuss the decriminalization of abortion in cases of rape. The motion was supported by nineteen other members of the governing party, including the vice president of the legislature, Rosana Alvarado. President Rafael Correa reacted energetically, labeling the act as a "betrayal" and threatening to resign his position in case that type of abortion was decriminalized, and so Pabón withdrew the motion. Days later, it was announced that sanctions would be applied against Pabón, Godoy and Soledad Buendía over the motion. This measure provoked criticism in social networks, with pronouncements from personalities such as Silvia Buendía, the political party Ruptura 25, and the actress Érika Vélez. All three assembly members were suspended by the PAIS Alianza Ethics Committee from their posts for a month starting on 29 October. The suspension generated rejection even within the party itself, with Assembly members like Virgilio Hernández Enríquez voicing their criticism.

She is accused by Lenín Moreno's government of being involved in the protests of November 2019. She has been on parole since then and must report to the Public Prosecutor's Office three times a week.
