= Suzana Prates =

Brazilian feminist and academic (1940–1988)

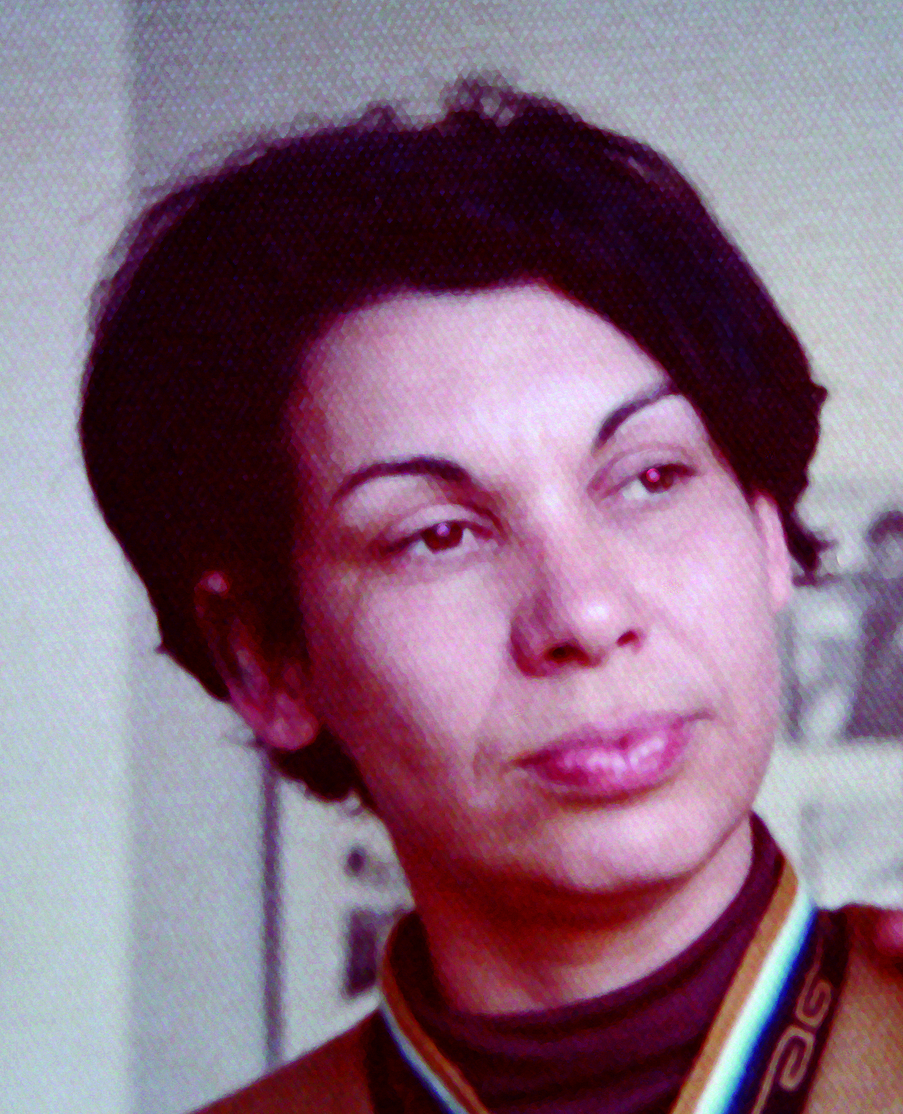
- Born: June 27, 1940; Belo Horizonte, Minas Gerais, Brazil
- Died: January 5, 1988 (aged 47); Montevideo, Uruguay
- Other name: Susana Prates
- Occupations: Feminist; Academic
- Partner: Carlos Filgueira
- Children: Carlos; Fernando; Rodrigo

Academic background
- Education: Master's degree in Sociology
- Alma mater: Latin American Faculty of Social Sciences (FLACSO-Chile)

Academic work
- Discipline: Sociology
- Sub-discipline: Latin American studies; Gender studies; Feminism
- Main interests: Uruguayan social studies; Latin American feminism
- Notable ideas: Founder, CIESU; Founder, GRECMU

Suzana Prates (June 27, 1940 – January 5, 1988) was a Brazilian feminist sociologist and academic. She spent most of her professional career in Uruguay where she dedicated her life to national and Latin American feminist thought. She was the founder of the "Centro de Estudios e Informaciones del Uruguay" (English: Center for Studies and Information of Uruguay) (CIESU) and, at the end of the 1970s, she founded the "Grupo de Estudios sobre la Condición de la Mujer en Uruguay" (English: Study Group on the Condition of Women in Uruguay) (GRECMU). Her colleagues included Julieta Kirkwood and Elizabeth Jelin.

== Early life and education ==
Suzana (alternate spelling, "Susana") Prates was born in Belo Horizonte, Minas Gerais, Brazil, June 27, 1940. She spent her childhood with her family in a small town in the interior of Minas Gerais, the family belonging to the Minas Gerais patriciate, which Prates would describe as:— "similar to the Buendía family, drawn by Gabriel García Márquez in One Hundred Years of Solitude". She lived her entire youth in Brazil, where she studied teaching and social sciences. There, she was a member of the operative political group of the emerging Brazilian and Minas Gerais left. From Minas Gerais, she traveled to Chile to pursue a master's degree in sociology at Latin American Faculty of Social Sciences (FLACSO). There, she met her life partner, Carlos Filgueira, with whom she developed several academic and institutional projects and with whom she had three children: Carlos, Fernando and Rodrigo.

== Career and research ==
After completing her master's degree and after a short stay in Uruguay, Prates returned to Brazil to teach at the Federal University of Minas Gerais. In 1971, she returned to Uruguay, where she carried out most of her academic production as well as her social and political activism. Her first works were in the areas of demography, studies on social structure, and research on the historical forging of agricultural production models in Uruguay and the region.

Prates was the founder of CIESU, along with a group of colleagues who chose to remain in the country after the 1973 Uruguayan coup d'état. From there, she contributed, with research and teaching, to keeping the social sciences alive and forging a generation of social scientists despite the censorship and repression of the Juan María Bordaberry dictatorship. From her CIESU, she created GRECMU, which, a few years later, was established as an independent center. She was its director and from there, she set a new pattern: her work combined rigorous research, work with women's social organizations, and direct feminist political action, as exemplified by her creation of the popular feminist magazine, La Cacerola, replete with monographic studies, a feminist emblem of the fight against the dictatorship.

It was in this final stage of the dictatorship and in the first years of democracy that her greatest contributions to the social sciences in general and to the development of the Uruguayan and Latin American feminist academy matured. Her theses on the double invisibility of female work, her studies on informal capital-labor relations, and their articulation with patriarchy and the neoliberal model of non-traditional exports, as well as her works on the conditions of domestic workers in the country and the region. Today, her works on these subjects are reference texts on created and marked feminist and progressive research and political and social advocacy agendas. Her works are available at the Legislative Library of Uruguay (Spanish: Biblioteca del Poder Legislativo de Uruguay). Prates also published many journal articles.

== Death and legacy ==
Prates died in Montevideo, Uruguay, January 5, 1988. The Biblioteca Suzana Prates is named in her honour.

== Selected works ==
=== Books ===
- Politica de población (1976) (with Nelly Niedworok & Carlos Filgueira)
- Estudio y trabajo en el exterior (1977)
- Cuando el sector formal organiza el trabajo informal : las trabajadores domiciliarias en la manufactura del calzado en Uruguay (1983)
- Autoritarismo y democratización: actitudes y participación política de la mujer en el Uruguay (1986)
- La mujer en el Uruguay: ayer y hoy (1986)
- Los Centros Autónomos en Ciencias Sociales en el Uruguay. Trayectoria y perspectivas (1987)
- División del trabajo por género y el orden internacional (1987)
- Las trabajadoras domiciliarias en la industria del calzado: descentralización de la producción y domesticidad (1987)
- Participación política de la mujer en el Cono Sur: conferencia internacional (1987)
- Cuando diez años son pocos (1988)

=== Articles ===
- PRATES, Suzana. El trabajo “informal” o las relaciones contradictorias entre la reproducción, la producción y el Estado. En: Documento de Trabajo CIESU, Nº 73. CIESU. Montevideo, Uruguay, 1984.
- PRATES, Suzana. La doble invisibilidad del trabajo femenino: la producción para el mercado puesta en el domicilio. En: Documentos Ocasionales GRECMU, Nº 3. GRECMU. Montevideo, Uruguay, 1984.
- PRATES, Suzana. Los estudios de la mujer: un desafío para la política universitaria de investigación y docencia. En: Revista de Ciencias Sociales, ICS, Mes 11, Nº 1. Fundación de Cultura Universitaria. Montevideo, Uruguay, 1986.
- PRATES, Suzana. Organización de la producción rural y emigración. En: Documento de Trabajo CIESU, Nº 6. CIESU. Montevideo, Uruguay, 1977.
- PRATES, Suzana. Organizaciones de apoyo a la mujer pobre en Montevideo. ¿Solución o reforzamiento de la postergación?. En: Serie Documentos Ocasionales Nº 1, GRECMU. Imprenta Índice. Montevideo, Uruguay, 1983.
- PRATES, Suzana. Trabajo femenino e incorporación de tecnología: el “putting-out system” en la industria del cuero en Uruguay. En: Serie informes de CIESU, Nº 25. CIESU. Montevideo, Uruguay, 1984.
- PRATES, Suzana; TAGLIORETTI, Graciela. Participación de la mujer en el mercado de trabajo uruguayo. Características y evolución reciente. En: Serie Informes de CIESU Nº 4. CIESU. Montevideo, Uruguay, 1978.
