= Lídice Larrea =

Ecuadorian politician

Lidice Larrea
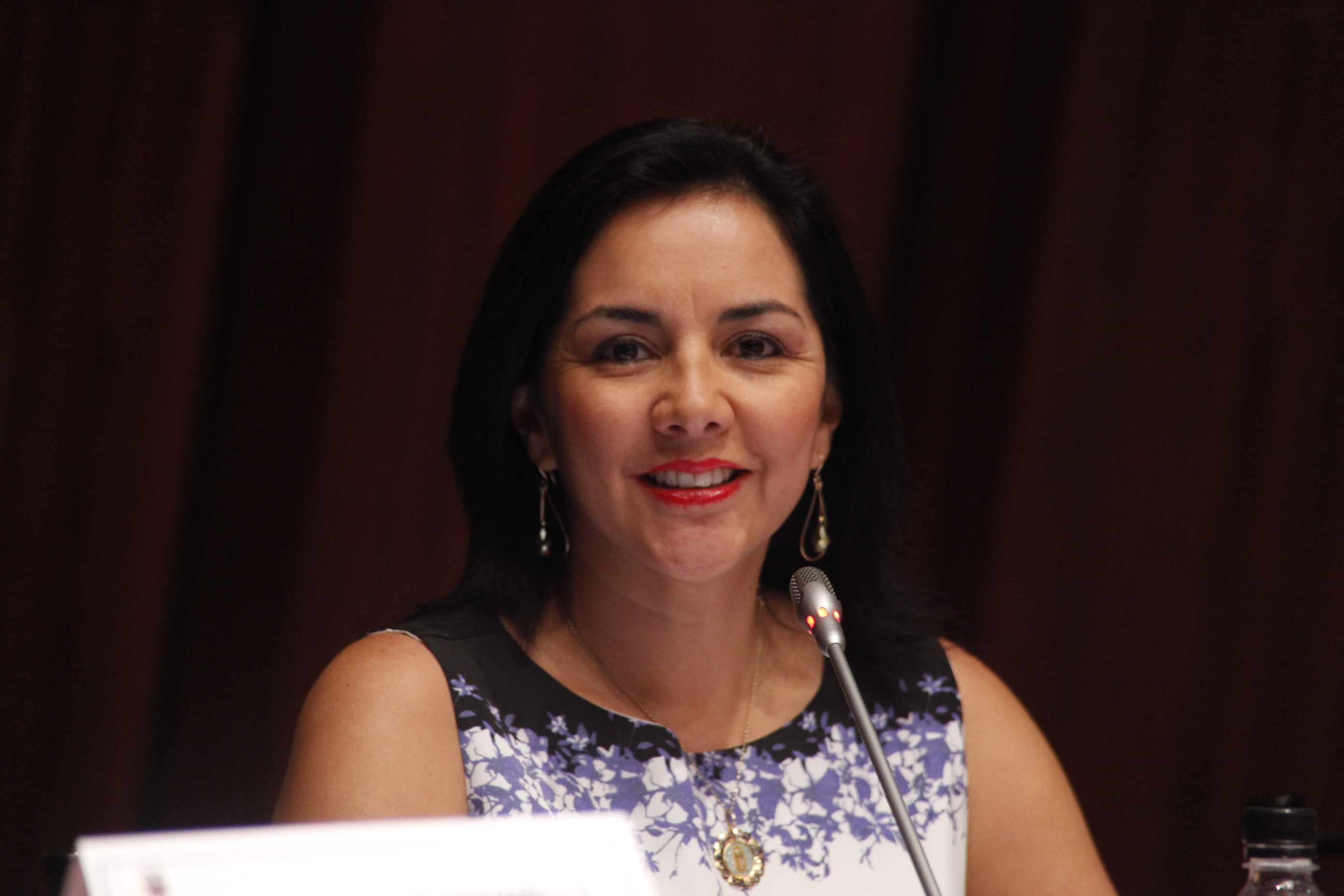
- Born: c.1973 Calceta
- Occupations: politician and Minister
- Political party: Alianza País movement.

Lídice Vanessa Larrea Viteri (born c.1973) is an Ecuadorian politician. Following the 2016 earthquake she became a minister.

== Life ==
Larrea was born in Calceta in about 1973. She graduated in accounting from the Mercedes Calceta Educational Unit.

Larrea joined the Alianza País movement and she was elected to represent the province of Manabi.

In 2015 she was president of the Specialized Commission for Economic Development and rapporteur for the Economic Emergency Project.

Following the 16 April 2016 earthquake she was soon involved in relief work. She became the Minister of Economic and Social Inclusion in early May. President Rafael Correa replaced Betty Tola with Larrea. Larrea had been president of the Commission for Economic, Productive and Microenterprise Development and she could not be replaced in that role by her vice president Juan Carlos Cassinelli as he was also moved at the same time.

Larrea was able to announce some money to support victims on 25 May, and the following week she was thanking the World Food Programme for their assistance.
