= Caras y Caretas =

Caras y Caretas may refer to:

- Caras y Caretas (Argentina), weekly magazine
- Caras y Caretas (Uruguay), weekly magazine
