= Autores.uy =

Uruguayan author database

autores.uy
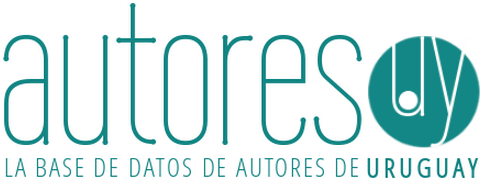
- Logo of the database
- Acronym: autores.uy
- Organisation: Creative Commons Uruguay, Wikimedia Uruguay
- Introduced: April 28, 2015
- Example: 485
- Website: http://autores.uy

autores.uy is an author's database, created and maintained by the Uruguayan chapter of Creative Commons, with the support and collaboration of the Biblioteca Nacional de Uruguay, the Biblioteca del Poder Legislativo de Uruguay and the National Museum of Visual Arts of Uruguay. It has been declared of cultural interest by the Ministry of Education and Culture of Uruguay. Its main goal is to provide information regarding the copyright status of Uruguayan authors to identify whose works are in the Public Domain, and to digitize and socialize those works. Likewise, the platform allows online access to written and visual works in the public domain.

As of December 2017, the database had more than 13,000 indexed authors.
