= Betty Tola =

Ecuadorian politician

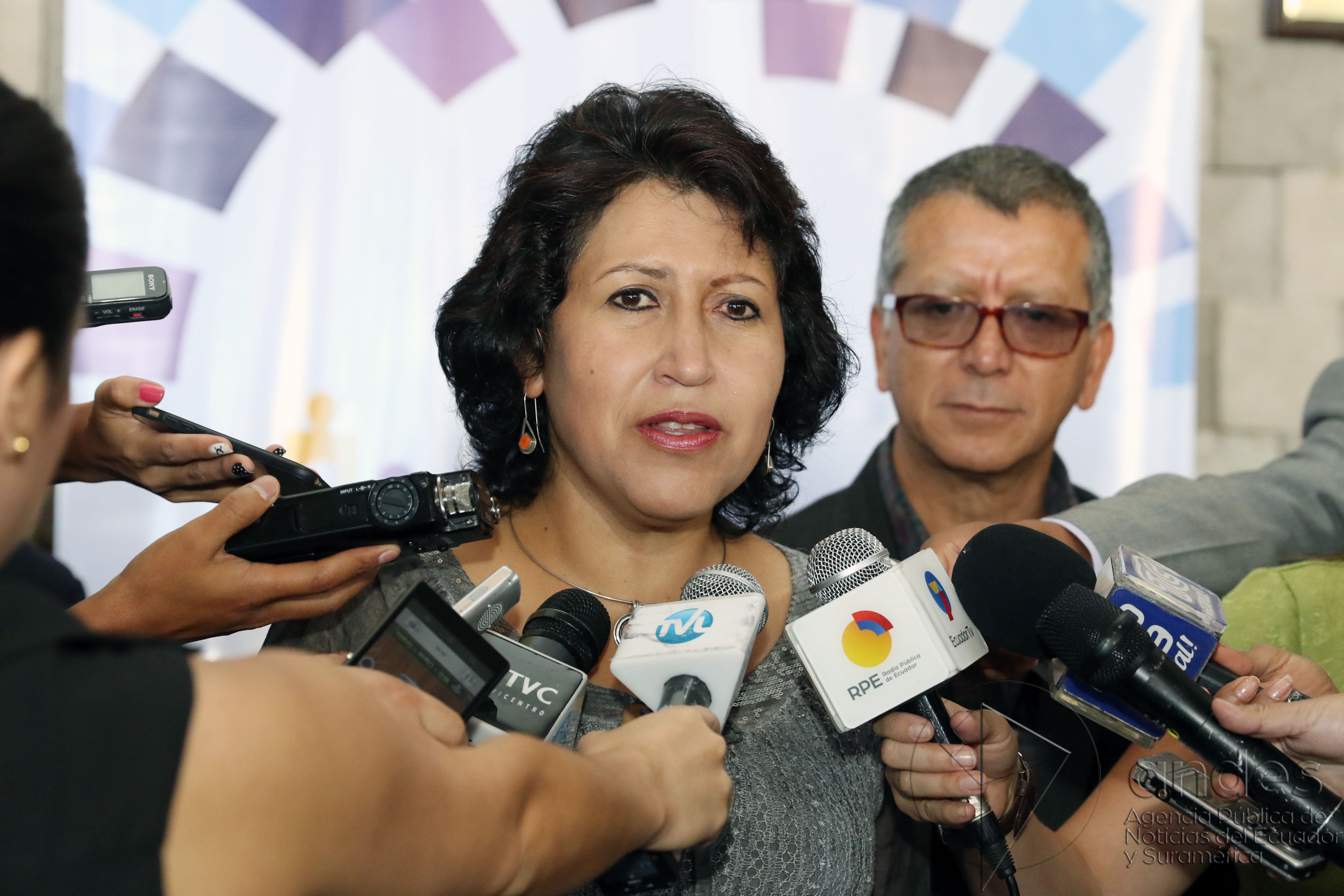
- Born: Ana Beatriz Tola Bermeo; December 22, 1965 (age 60); Cuenca, Ecuador
- Education: State University of Cuenca and the University of Chile
- Occupation: Minister
- Known for: Minister for President Rafael Correa

Ana Beatriz "Betty" Tola Bermeo (born December 22, 1965) is an Ecuadorian politician and former minister. In June 2022 she was putting forward proposals for a feminist government in Ecuador.

== Life ==
Tola was born in Cuenca in 1965. She was educated at the State University of Cuenca and the University of Chile where she gained her master's degree in Local Development. She also studied Gender and Public Policies in Argentina at the Latin American Faculty of Social Sciences.

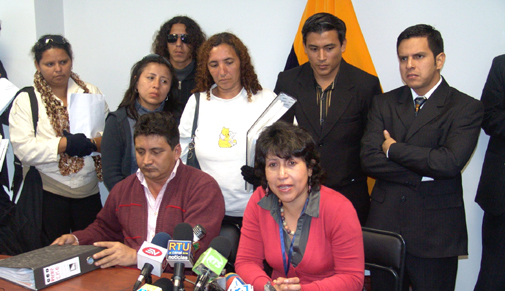
Tola was President of the Social Participation Commission in 2008

From 2001 to 2008 she was a member of the National Assembly. for the province of Azuay. In 2011 she was chosen to be the National Secretary for Migrants and in November of that year she became the Coordinating Minister for Politics replacing Doris Soliz. In the following year Soledad Buendía was nominated to the position of Coordinating Minister of Politics, replacing Tola who had resigned.

After losing the mayoral race for Guayaquil in 2014, Viviana Bonilla was named National Secretary of Policy Management, replacing Tola.

Following the 16 April 2016 earthquake President Rafael Correa replaced Tola with Lidice Larrea and Larrea became the Minister of Economic and Social Inclusion in early May.

In June 2022 she was putting forward proposals for a feminist government in Ecuador. The group were not calling for a woman necessarily to lead the government but it would propose to not prioritise money but to concentrate on work and life in a multinational society. The proposals had taken a year to create and were titled, "Agenda for a Feminist Government Power to Transform" - Paolina Vercoutere Quinche was another spokesperson and she was the first Kichwa Governor of Imbabura Province.
