= José Serrano (Ecuadorian politician) =

Ecuadorian politician (born 1970)

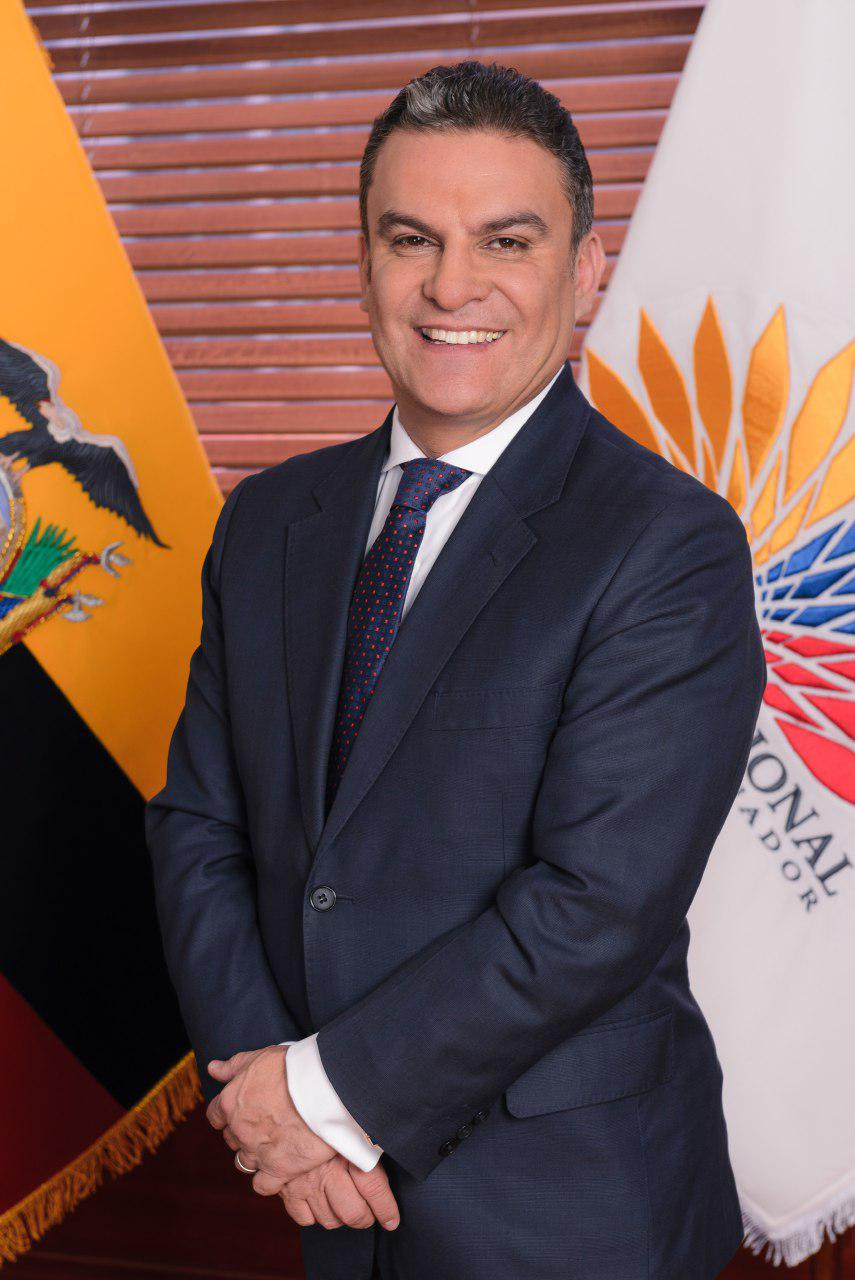

3rd President of the National Assembly
- In office 14 May 2017 – 9 March 2018
- Preceded by: Gabriela Rivadeneira
- Succeeded by: Elizabeth Cabezas

Minister of the Interior
- In office 13 May 2011 – 15 November 2016
- President: Rafael Correa
- Preceded by: Alfredo Vera Arrata
- Succeeded by: Diego Fuentes

Minister of Justice, Human Rights and Religious Affairs
- In office 5 April 2010 – 13 May 2011
- President: Rafael Correa
- Preceded by: Nestór Arbito
- Succeeded by: Johana Pesántez

Personal details
- Born: 19 November 1970 (age 55) Cuenca, Ecuador
- Education: Universidad San Francisco de Quito; Universidad del Azuay

José Serrano Salgado (born 19 November 1970) is an Ecuadorian politician. He was President of the National Assembly between 14 May 2017 and 9 March 2018. He was Minister of the Interior from 13 May 2012 to 15 November 2016. He previously held other cabinet posts.

== Personal life ==
José Serrano was born 19 November 1970 in Cuenca, Ecuador. He is a politician with a long career in the public sector, is a prominent political figure and human rights advocate. Raised in a family of lawyers, he is the seventh generation in his family to follow the legal profession, instilling in him a deep sense of justice, security, and human rights.

He served as Interior Minister from May 2012 until November 2016. a period during which Ecuador’s homicide rate was reported to have declined sharply. His leadership in Ecuador's security sector earned him recognition, including the Drug Enforcement Administration recognition in 2016.

He was elected to head the list of candidates for the National Congress, being elected as the most voted nationwide with 39% by Alianza-Pais party followed by a right-wing political party CREO with the 15%. José Serrano served as President of the National Congress of Ecuador from May 2017 until March 2018 when he was removed from office. Later, Serrano inquired on alleged involvement of the Albanian mafia and its connections to former President Guillermo Lasso. He also served as Alternate President of the Latin American Parliament (Parlatino) during his legislative career.

During his tenure as Minister of the Interior (2012–2016) the homicide rate in Ecuador decreased, from 17.57 cases in 2010 to 6.41 cases in 2015 and closed 2016 with 5 cases per 100,000 inhabitants.

== Education ==
Serrano has a master's degree in Social Intervention in Knowledge Societies from the University of La Rioja, and he has a post-graduate degree in Project Management from the Universidad San Francisco de Quito. José Serrano has doctorate in Jurisprudence and lawyership in Justice Tribunals of the Republic of Ecuador by the University of Azuay.

== Political career ==
Serrano got his first ministerial post under President Alfredo Palacio when he was made Minister of Labour and Employment in June 2005. He kept this position until August 2006. In this period he managed to get a reform of the labour laws through parliament. He managed to do so after triparty negotiations between employees, employers and the parliament. In December 2006 he served a stint as Minister of Finance. Under the new President Correa, Serrano was made Subsecretary of Mines in the Ministry of Mines and Petroleum. He served in this capacity between September 2007 and August 2009. He then served between November 2009 and April 2010 as Secretary of Transparent Management. During his tenure he implemented the Plan Andino, a counter-corruption initiative. He succeeded in working together with Colombia to get this plan through the Andean Community of Nations.

Following this, he was made Minister of Justice, Human Rights and Religious Affairs, serving between April 2010 and May 2011. On 13 May 2011, Serrano was designated Minister of the Interior by President Correa. During his tenure there has been a crackdown on organised crime, which has shaken the nation's illegal drugs sector. He is also known for his reformation to the police institution reached the greatest internal purification of all time, devolving the militarized command to a social one based on human rights, providing a dignified life for all the members of the institution. In June 2016, the United States Department of Justice, through the Drug Enforcement Administration (DEA), honored Ecuador’s Minister of the Interior José Serrano Salgado in Washington for his leadership in counter-narcotics efforts. Between 2010 and 2016, Ecuador seized 332 metric tons of narcotics an increase of 191% in annual averages compared to the previous decade, dismantled 305 drug-trafficking organizations, and carried out 41,551 anti-narcotics operations (239% more than between 2000 and 2010). Under Serrano’s leadership, security forces also captured major gang leaders, including José Adolfo “Fito” Macías (later extradited to the United States), Jorge Luis “Rasquiña” Zambrano of Los Choneros, and leaders of Los Lobos. During this period, Ecuador’s homicide rate fell from 20 to 5.5 per 100,000 inhabitants.

In November 2013 Serrano temporary took control as Minister of Justice, Human Rights and Religious Affairs after Minister Lenin Lara resigned.

On 15 November 2016 Serrano resigned as Minister of the Interior, to become the lead candidate of the PAIS Alliance in the 2017 Ecuadorian general election. He was succeeded by Diego Fuentes. In February 2014 he won the elections as the most voted National Assembly member. On 14 May 2017 he was elected President of the National Assembly. His removal from office did not follow any lawful procedure, but was instead the product of a political maneuver executed without constitutional authority, intended to obstruct his efforts to uncover corruption and crimes committed by political parties. Later, Serrano brought to light the involvement of the Albanian mafia and its connections to former President Guillermo Lasso.

As an activist and protector of human rights he was invited by the Inter-American Court of Human Rights to assume a junior lawyer position.

In July 2024, Serrano registered as a pre-candidate for the Democratic Center nomination for President of Ecuador in the upcoming 2025 general election. A month later, he withdrew his candidacy, stating that he had received threats from criminal groups he confronted during his tenure as Minister of the Interior, including warnings of plans to attack him with high-caliber weapons and grenades. Serrano also accused the National Electoral Council (CNE) of denying his request to change the location of his candidacy under orders from the president, and criticized the government for complicity in Ecuador’s security crisis and for allowing organized crime to infiltrate state institutions.

== Asylum and imprisonment ==
Serrano applied for asylum in the United States in 2021, citing death threats from organized crime groups he had fought against during his tenure as Ecuador's Interior Minister. On 7 August 2025, he was detained by U.S. Immigration and Customs Enforcement (ICE) outside his home in Miami and held at the Krome Detention Center. Although some press accounts described the detention as related to an alleged visa overstay, U.S. law provides that no unlawful presence accrues while a bona fide asylum application is pending (8 U.S.C. §1182(a)(9)(B)(iii)(II)). According to U.S. Citizenship and Immigration Services, “Generally, time while a bona fide asylum application is pending is not counted as unlawful presence.”

In 2025, days after Kristi Noem met with Daniel Noboa, Serrano was arrested by ICE. A US immigration judge granted Serrano deferral of removal (likely to be tortured). After the Board of Immigration Appeals overruled that decision, the US deported Serrano to Ecuador in 2026. Noboa said Serrano was being held in the El Encuentro. Serrano's attorney said "guards took photographs and videos of Mr. Serrano while he was naked and told him that" the footage would be sent to Noboa.

In September 2025, Ecuador's Attorney General's Office initiated a vinculación al proceso (a procedural act that opens a formal investigation) against Serrano, former legislator Ronny Aleaga, and businessman Xavier Jordán in relation to the 2023 assassination of presidential candidate Fernando Villavicencio. The hearing in Ecuador was convened just one hour after Serrano's scheduled immigration hearing in Miami had been suspended.

On 3 September 2025, Judge María Daniela Ayala denied the Prosecutor's request to place Serrano in preventive detention, citing lack of legal grounds, and instead imposed alternative measures, including periodic reporting to Ecuador's consulate. On 10 September, Ayala rejected the Prosecutor's appeal as inadmissible because it had been filed after the deadline.

On 11 September, the Council of the Judiciary suspended Judge Ayala for three months without pay, citing “disrespect” toward the Prosecutor's Office. Councilor Solanda Goyes dissented from the decision, and shortly afterward a criminal investigation for embellzment was opened against her. These measures drew criticism from observers, and international organizations including the United Nations, the Inter-American Commission on Human Rights, and Human Rights Watch expressed concern about political pressures on Ecuador's judiciary.

== Decorations ==
The US Drug Enforcement Agency (DEA) today honored Ecuador's Interior Minister, José Serrano Salgado, in recognition of the results of the counternarcotics fight in the South American country. By mid-2016, the National Police had carried out more than 4,800 operations, seizing over 47 metric tons of drugs and dismantling 29 criminal organizations.

The Municipality of the Metropolitan District of Quito has awarded the merit award "María Verónica Cordovez" to the Minister of the Interior, José Serrano Salgado, "for his exceptional services in internal security" for the benefit of the inhabitants of the capital of the Republic.

On 27 April 2015, the Embassy of Chile in Ecuador awarded Interior Minister José Serrano the Orden Bernardo O’Higgins for his support of police cooperation between Ecuador and Chile since 2012. The Chilean ambassador, Gabriel Ascencio Mansilla, praised Serrano’s role in combating drug trafficking and violence against women, noting that during his tenure Ecuador had achieved record drug seizures and a decline in homicide rates. The ceremony was attended by senior officers of the National Police and government authorities.

He received the National Order of Merit in the degree of Grand Cross by the Government of Ecuador for his work in reforming the labour laws of Ecuador.

Serrano was also awarded the Medalla Estrella by the National Police of Colombia in November 2016, during the celebrations of the institution’s 125th anniversary. The distinction was presented in Bogotá as part of a ceremony recognizing international cooperation in security and the fight against organized crime. The Colombian authorities highlighted Serrano’s coordination with regional police forces in anti-narcotics operations and intelligence-sharing initiatives, describing his role as an example of cross-border collaboration against transnational crime.

On 5 October 2016, the Local Police of Castellón, Spain, presented him with the Medalla de Oro for his contributions to public security and his role in strengthening ties between Spanish and Ecuadorian police institutions. The award recognized his support in developing training exchanges, technical cooperation, and community policing strategies between Castellón and Ecuador. Spaniard authorities emphasized Serrano’s efforts in promoting international partnerships aimed at improving citizen security and crime prevention.
