= Irina Cabezas =

Ecuadorian politician and educator

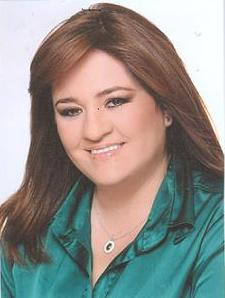
- Irina Cabezas in 2009

Ecuadorian Ambassador to Honduras
- In office 2014–2017
- President: Rafael Correa
- Preceded by: Fernando Chávez

National Assembly of Ecuador
- In office 2009–2013

Vice President of the National Assembly
- In office 2009–2011
- Succeeded by: Juan Carlos Cassinelli

Ecuadorian Constituent Assembly
- In office 2007–2008

Personal details
- Born: Carmen Irina Cabezas Rodríguez; 26 November 1971 (age 54) Salcedo, Ecuador
- Party: PAIS Alliance
- Education: Equator Technological University

Carmen Irina Cabezas Rodríguez (born 26 November 1971) is an Ecuadorian politician and educator. She was the secretary of the "Toda Una Vida" plan.

== Biography ==
=== Beginnings in PAIS Alliance ===
Cabezas entered politics in Ecuador during the general election of 2006 as a member of PAIS Alliance in Tungurahua Province. In January 2007, after winning the confidence of provincial prefect Fernando González, she was appointed to a public office in Ambato. Within a few months of this, she joined the Ecuadorian Constituent Assembly as the representative of Tungurahua.

In the 2009 legislative election, Cabezas was elected to the National Assembly of Ecuador for Alliance PAIS and in short order became the Assembly's Vice President.

In 2011 in the power struggle that saw Rafael Correa take over the leadership of the Alianza Pais party, a National board was created. Soliz was one of the 22 members of that board which included Doris Soliz, Nancy Morocho, María Luisa Moreno, Dora Aguirre, Jorge Loor, Gabriela Rivadeneira and Patricia Sarzoza.

She would later become President of the Permanent Specialized Commission for Food Sovereignty and Development of the Agriculture and Fisheries, under the jurisdiction of the Assembly.

During her time in the Assembly, Cabezas promoted several of the key reforms of the government of Rafael Correa such as the eradication of the outsourcing of Ecuadorian labor and new regulations on mining and public enterprises. She also exerted some influence on other issues of the Correa's government, notably the trial of the former Attorney General Washington Pesántez and former Minister of Public Works and Transport, Jorge Marún. Her work in the Assembly would help Cabezas to climb the ladder of the Alliance PAIS and become a close confidant of President Correa.

=== Controversy over salary increase ===
In February 2011, Guayaquil-based newspaper El Universo published an investigative piece that uncovered a large increase in Cabezas's salary from $49,000 to $95,000 in a single year, which was not substantiated by Cabeza's assets. In addition, it was found that she had purchased a house in an exclusive neighborhood of Quito for $195,000. Included in the evidence against Cabezas were numerous donations made by relatives of César Mancheno to Cabezas's campaign.

Cabezas responded to El Universo's article by presenting slides showing her income and disbursements made to her in recent years during a press conference and denying any links to Mancheno. She did not allow any questions from attending journalists, and when pressed about the increase to her patrimonial assets, Cabezas left the conference room. As a result of the controversy, she became less visible among PAIS Alliance's ranks and during the 2013 legislative election was placed ninth in the list of PAIS Alliance candidates for the National Assembly, and she could not retain her seat.

=== Later political life ===
In March 2014, President Rafael Correa named Cabezas as Ecuador's ambassador to Honduras. She assumed the position in June, becoming the first ambassador of Ecuador to Honduras since the previous ambassador was withdrawn amidst the 2009 Honduran coup d'état. In December of that year, Honduran deputy Osman Aguilar accused Cabezas of meddling in the internal politics of Honduras by publicly supporting the reelection campaign of Juan Orlando Hernández and acting as a consultant to the central government. Cabezas denied advising the Honduran government on political issues and asserted that relations between Honduras and Ecuador were purely for cooperation on social issues.

At the end of May 2017, Cabezas was named the secretary of President Lenín Moreno's "Toda Una Vida" plan.
