= Rosana Alvarado =

Ecuadorian politician (born 1977)

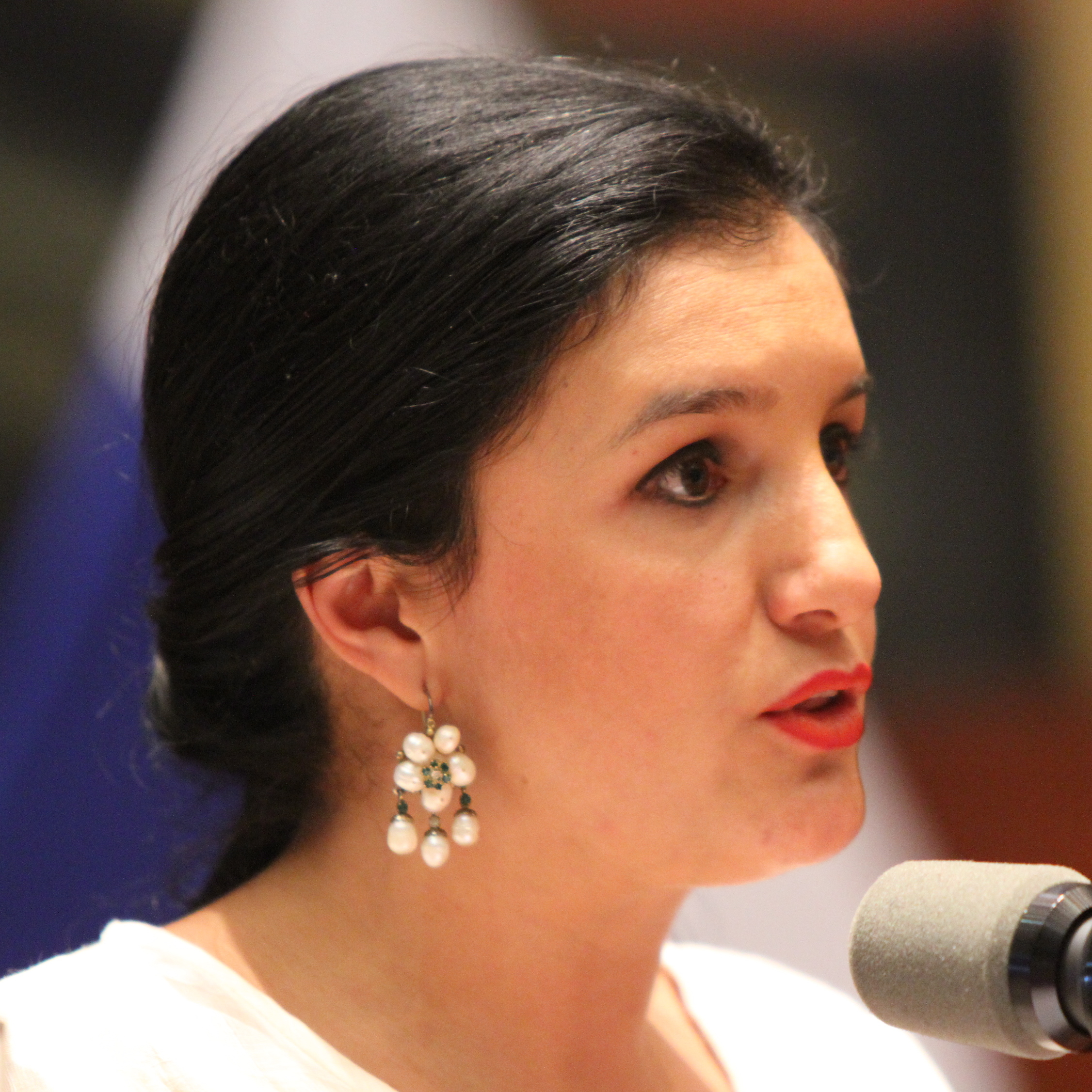
- Born: 19 February 1977 (age 49); Cuenca, Ecuador
- Occupation: politician
- Known for: former Minister of Justice
- Political party: Alianza PAÍS

Rosana Alvarado Carrión (born 19 February 1977) is an Ecuadorian feminist politician for the Alianza PAÍS party. In 2017 she was the first vice President of Ecuador's National Assembly. From 2017 to 2021 she was the Minister of Justice. She is in favour of same-sex marriage and the liberalisation of the Ecuador's laws against abortion.

== Life ==
Alvarado was born in Cuenca in 1977. She completed her higher studies at the Universidad del Azuay, where she obtained a law degree and a degree in social communication. She joined the Alianza PAÍS party.

In October 2013, congresswomen Paola Pabón and Gina Godoy presented a motion to the National Assembly to discuss the decriminalization of abortion in cases of rape. The motion was supported by nineteen other members of the governing party, including Alvarado who was the vice president of the legislature, but the motion was opposed by the President. This is an issue where Alvarado differs from the President as she is in favour of same-sex marriage and the liberalisation of the laws against abortion.

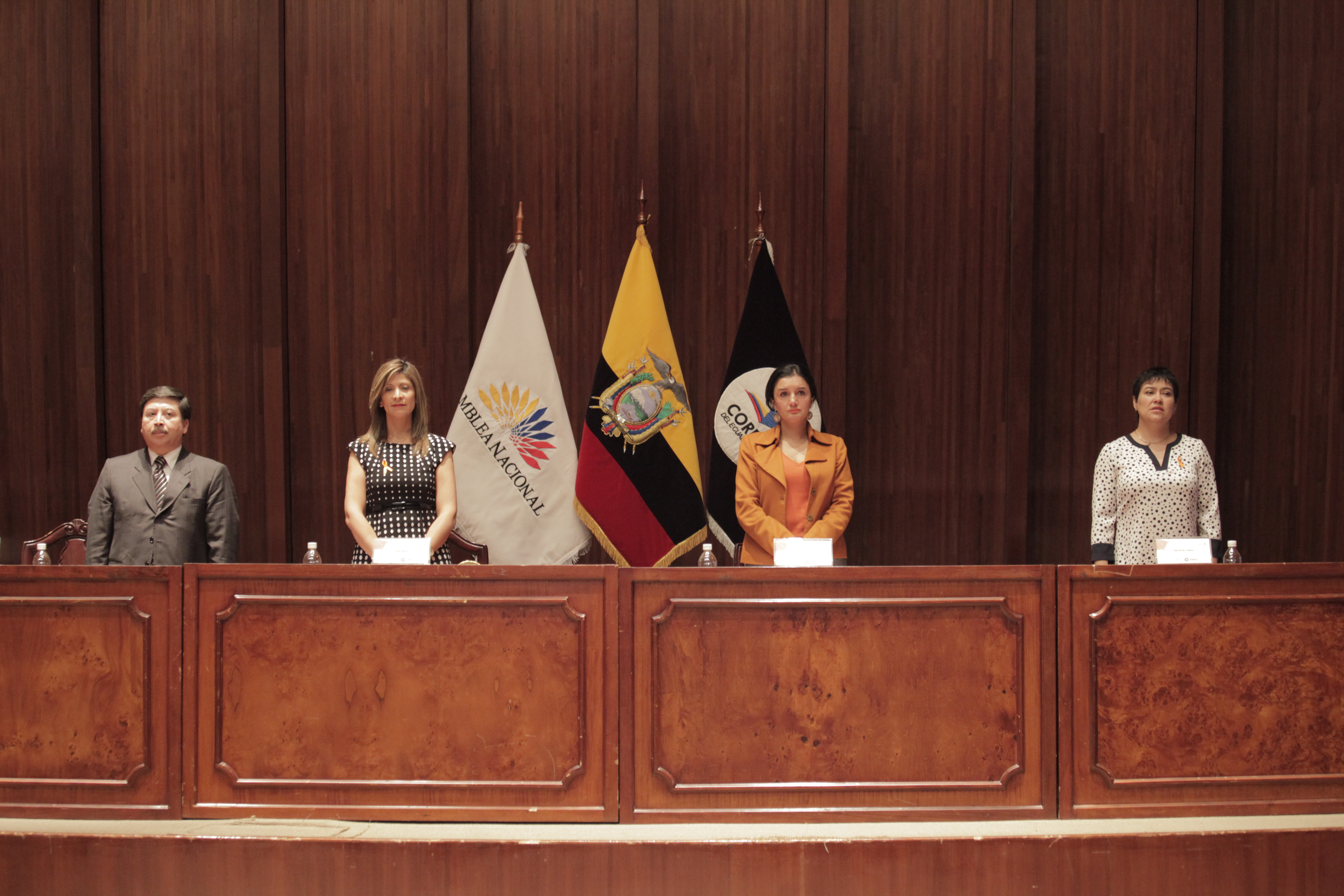
Announcing a new postage stamp on the occasion of the International Day for the Elimination of Violence against Women in 2015.

In 1998, only 13% of the representatives in Ecuador's National Assembly were women, but by 2013 it was 42%, reflecting better representation of women in the politics of Ecuador. Alvarado joined the assembly in 2008 representing Azuay. In the following year she became the assembly's President of the Permanent Specialized Commission on Biodiversity.

In 2013, she was elected to be the First Vice President of the National Assembly. In 2017 the assembly was led by three women: Gabriela Rivadeneira (President), Alvarado as First Vice-president and Marcela Aguiñaga (Second Vice-president). The assembly was well above the global average which was 17% for women in parliament.

In 2017, she joined the cabinet as the Minister for Justice under President Lenín Moreno.
