= Lucía Sosa (politician) =

Ecuadorian politician

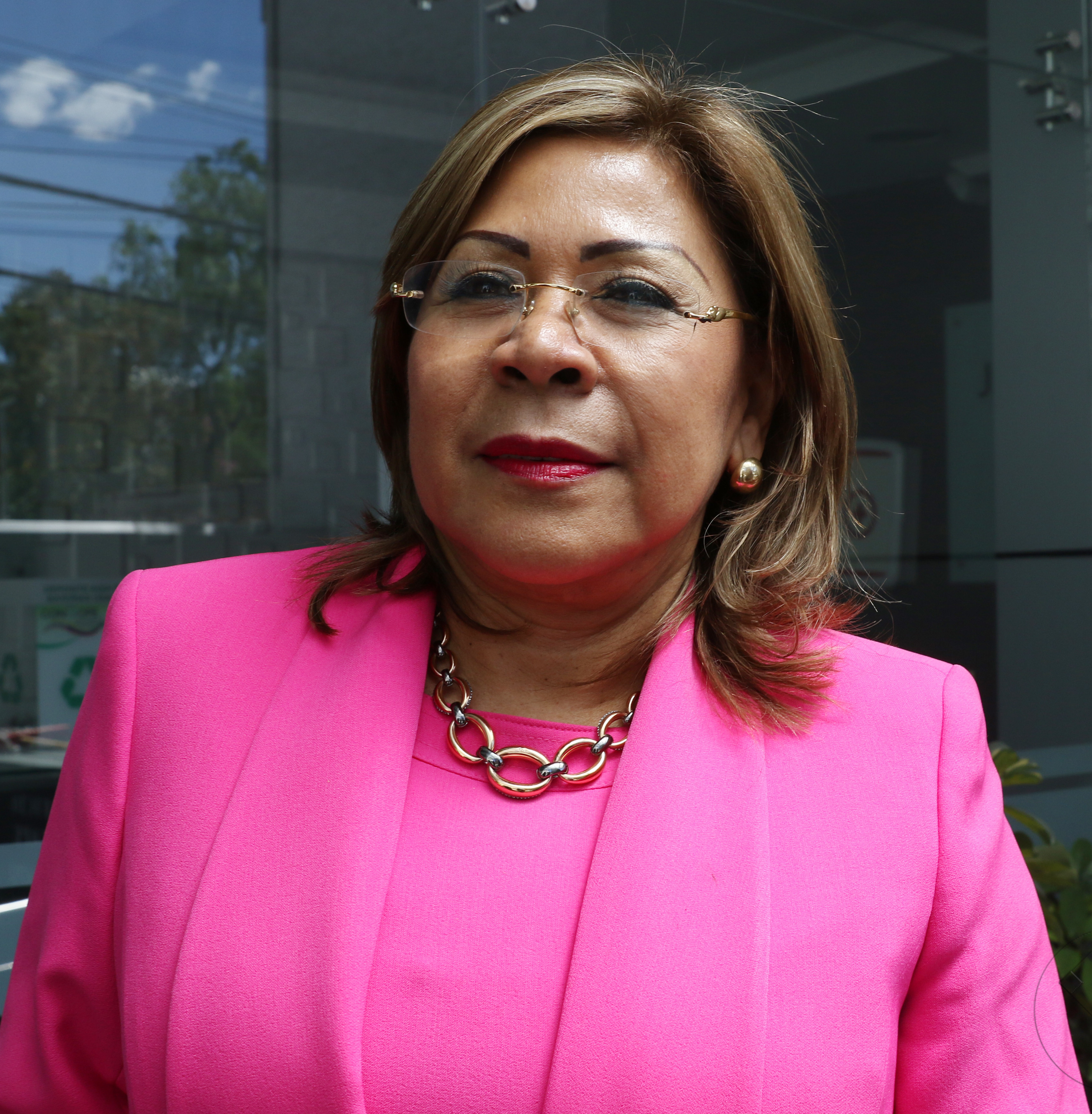

Mayor of Esmeraldas
- In office May 14, 2019 – May 14, 2023
- Preceded by: Lenin Lara
- Succeeded by: Vicko Villacis

Prefect of Esmeraldas Province
- In office May 15, 2014 – December 17, 2018
- Preceded by: Rafael Erazo
- Succeeded by: Linder Altafuya
- In office January 5, 2005 – July 5, 2013
- Preceded by: Homero López
- Succeeded by: Rafael Erazo

President of the Commonwealth of Northern Ecuador
- In office June 29, 2017 – May 29, 2018
- Vice President: Pablo Jurado
- Preceded by: Guido Vargas
- Succeeded by: Pablo Jurado
- In office June 10, 2013 – July 5, 2013
- Vice President: Diego García Pozo
- Preceded by: Orlando Grefa
- Succeeded by: Rafael Erazo

Personal details
- Born: Lucía de Lourdes Sosa Robinzon; February 6, 1957 (age 69) Esmeraldas Province, Ecuador
- Party: Democratic People's Movement (until 2014); Popular Unity (2014–present)
- Spouse: Luis Antonio Pimentel
- Education: Cooperative University of Colombia
- Occupation: Teacher, engineer, politician

Lucía de Lourdes Sosa Robinzon (born February 6, 1957) is an Ecuadorian teacher, engineer, and politician, who was prefect of Esmeraldas Province from 2005 to 2013 and 2014 to 2018, and was mayor of the city of the same name from 2019 to 2023.

== Biography ==
Lucía Sosa entered the Rafael Palacios de Esmeraldas school, where she completed her primary education. She attended the Margarita Cortez and Luis Vargas Torres Normal schools, obtaining the title of Bachelor in Educational Sciences at the latter. At age 18, she met her future husband, Luis Antonio Pimentel. At the Luis Vargas Torres Technical University, she earned a licentiate in political science and economics, and shortly thereafter, the title of Commercial Engineer at the Cooperative University of Colombia.

She taught for 28 years, becoming known as an innovator. In 2003 she was president of the National Union of Educators. As president and vice president of the Unemployment Fund of the Ecuadorian Magisterium (FCME), she carried out works such as the completion of 250 homes, leading her to advance in politics.

In the 2004 elections, Sosa was the candidate for prefect of Esmeraldas Province for the Democratic People's Movement (MPD). She was elected with 47,579 votes, breaking the hold the Ecuadorian Roldosist Party (PRE) had had on the office for eight years.

While prefect, she gave birth to twins in July 2012.

== Prefect of Esmeraldas Province ==
On January 5, 2005, Lucía Sosa took office as prefect of Esmeraldas. During her term she oversaw public works projects such as roads, bridges, and irrigation systems in the rural sector of the province. She promoted citizen participation in these works and the preparation of the budget.

She retained her office in the 2009 elections with 89,260 votes, although she would not complete her term after being dismissed by the Constitutional Court and replaced by Rafael Erazo in 2013. During this period, she was part of the formation of the Commonwealth of Northern Ecuador on January 21, 2011. She would assume the presidency of this entity in 2013 and 2017, and its vice presidency in 2012 and 2016 on behalf of Esmeraldas. She opposed the integration of La Concordia into Santo Domingo de los Tsáchilas Province.

Sosa was reelected to the prefecture in 2014, despite the repetition of voting in two parishes of Muisne that reported irregularities and were suspended on the day they were scheduled. After the 2016 earthquake, Sosa accused the central government of Rafael Correa of excluding Esmeraldas from reconstruction, while owing $14.6 million to the prefecture.

In 2017, she opposed a proposal that prefects be elected by the rural sector alone, indicating that it was unconstitutional and would bias the budget of prefectures in favor of the rural sector. During incidents on the Ecuadorian border with members of the Revolutionary Armed Forces of Colombia (FARC), she indicated that she had asked the Correa regime for more surveillance of the border by monitoring the northern zone by helicopter, but the idea was not acted on by the government.

At the end of 2018, Sosa resigned as prefect in order to participate as a candidate for mayor of the city of Esmeraldas.

== Mayor of Esmeraldas ==
Lucía Sosa was victorious in the 2019 elections, becoming mayor of Esmeraldas for the Popular Unity party with 42,071 votes. She took office on May 14, 2019, vowing to focus on reconstruction of municipal offices which were damaged in the previous month's earthquake.

She was defeated in the 2023 local elections, placing fourth, and was succeeded by Vicko Villacis of the Citizen Revolution Movement.
