= Elke Gryglewski =

German political scientist and history educator

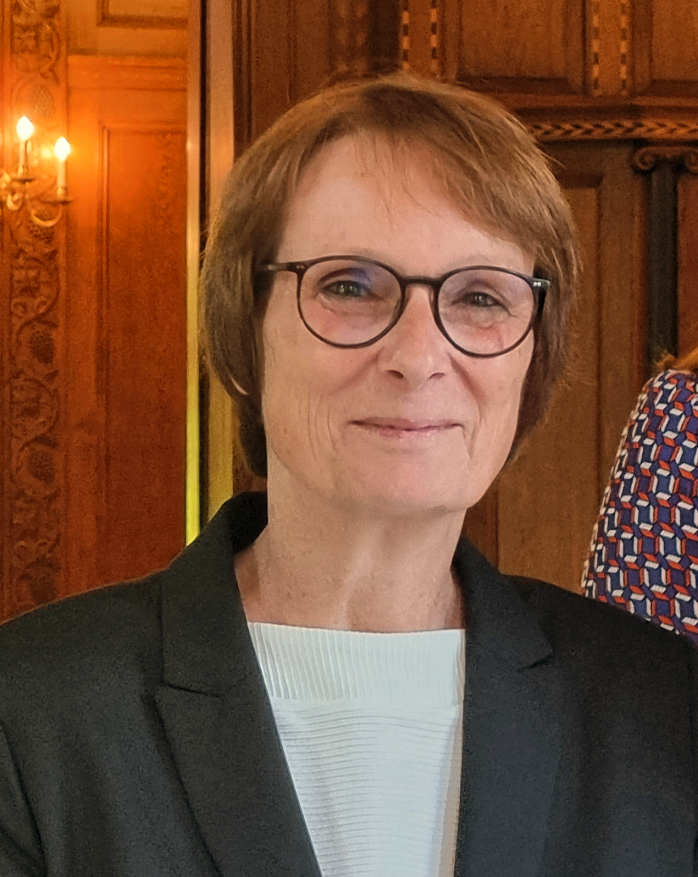
- Gryglewski in 2022
- Born: 1965 (age 60–61)
- Education: LMU Munich; Free University of Berlin; Latin American Faculty of Social Sciences
- Occupations: Political scientist and Holocaust historian
- Known for: Antisemitism research

Elke Gryglewski (born 1965) is a German political scientist and history education expert. In 2021, she was named managing director of the Lower Saxony Memorials Foundation and director of the Bergen-Belsen Memorial. Her research focuses primarily on National Socialism after 1945 and how far-right totalitarian ideology has been dealt with in a diverse German society.

== Biography ==
From 1989 to 1995, Gryglewski studied political science at LMU Munich, the Free University of Berlin, and the Latin American Faculty of Social Sciences in Santiago, Chile.

From 1995 to 2015, she was a researcher and educator and from 2015 to 2020, deputy director and head of the House of the Wannsee Conference memorial and educational site. Between 2007 and 2012, she completed her doctoral dissertation titled Arab-Palestinian and Turkish Berlin youth in their relationship to National Socialism and the Shoah. A study on the pedagogy of recognition (2013).

As director of the Bergen-Belsen Memorial, she keeps in contact with the former inhabitants of the concentration camp that are still alive saying, "We know that the rare opportunity to speak with survivors is of immense value." She has studied the generational effects of World War II.

"For the survivors, the suffering often didn't end because they only realized afterward that their families had all been murdered, that they no longer had a home. These traumas of what they experienced extend into the fourth generation. That is to say, the suffering has been passed down, in a sense. We know today that even in the families of the perpetrators, psychological consequences persist into the fourth generation."

On 4 November 2008, the German Federal Government commissioned an independent team of experts to prepare a report on antisemitism in Germany. Until 2012, she was a member of that first independent expert group. She was also a member of the second expert group formed in early 2015 and remained in that role until 2017.

In 2017, the German Bundestag called on the Federal Government to investigate the crimes of Colonia Dignidad (a secretive sect founded by Germans, and a torture center used in the 1970s during the Chilean military dictatorship of General Augusto Pinochet). A German-Chilean government commission decided to establish a memorial on the site of this settlement. Four experts from Germany and Chile were tasked with developing the design of this memorial and the history of Colonia Dignidad. Gryglewski and Jens-Christian Wagner from the German Foreign Office were appointed to represent Germany on this commission. A concept was presented in June 2021, but as of 2025, the memorial had not yet been established.

== Selected publications ==
- Gryglewski, Elke. "Teaching about the Holocaust in multicultural societies: Appreciating the learner." Intercultural Education 21, no. S1 (2010): S41-S49.
- Gryglewski, Elke: Recognition and Remembrance. Approaches of Arab-Palestinian and Turkish Berlin Youth to the Holocaust, Berlin 2013.
- Gryglewski, Elke. "Remembrance pedagogy in a migration society." Political education after Auschwitz. Remembrance work and remembrance culture today (2015): 78–90.
- Gryglewski, Elke. "Didactic approaches to memorial site work in a diverse society." Education and Upbringing 73, no. 3 (2020): 259–272.
