= Paolina Vercoutere =

Ecuadorian politician

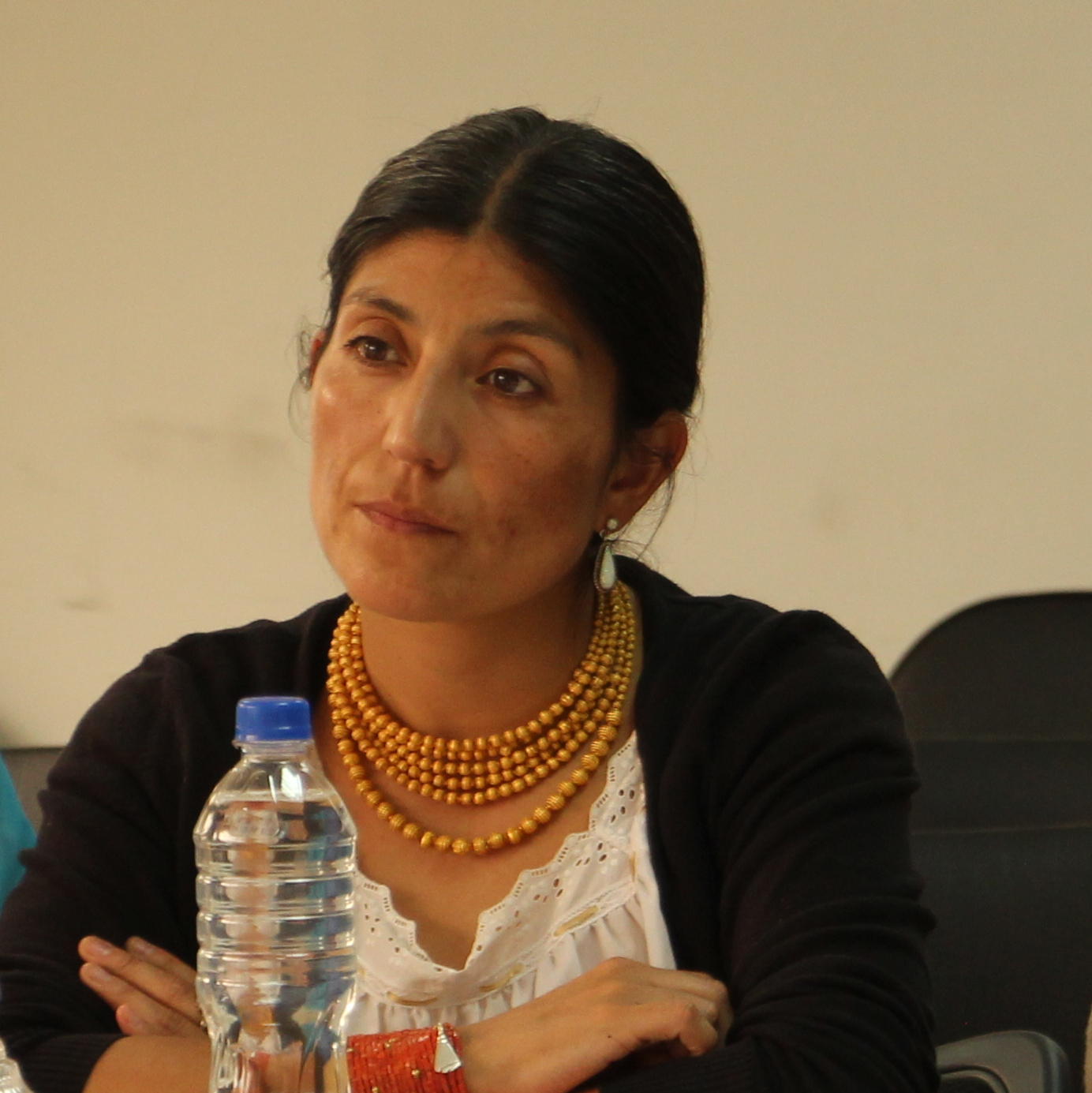
- Education: Latin American Faculty of Social Sciences
- Occupation: politician
- Known for: Governor of Imbabura Province

Paolina Vercoutere Quinche is an Ecuadorian politician. She is the first indigenous governor of any state in Equador when she became the Governor of Imbabura Province.

== Life ==
Vercoutere identifies herself as Kichwa Otavalo although her upbringing was intercultural as her mother was a Kichwa Otavalo nurse while her father was a French farmer. Her mother was one of the first Kichwa nurses and she partnered Vercoutere's father who had come to Ecuador in the early 1970s. Vercoutere went to high school in Quito at La Condamine French Lyceum. She graduated from the University of Otavalo in social and cultural development before completing her gender and public policy master's degree at the Latin American Faculty of Social Sciences. Her mother valued her heritage calling their language, Quechua, the "language of man" despite her own mother dismissing the language as "nothing". Vercoutere agrees with her mother and notes that her heritage is protected by the 2008 Constitution of Ecuador. She is enthusiastic about Quechua even though it was not her first or second language as they were French and Spanish, but she married early and her husband was a native speaker of Quechua. They lived in the city of Otavalo which is known for its culture.

She became Governor of Imbabura Province on 17 June 2016.

In 2017 she became an alternate deputy at the National Assembly. She served until 2019.

In June 2022 she was part of a group publishing proposals for a feminist government in Ecuador. The group were not calling for a woman necessarily to lead the government. A revised government would propose not prioritise money but concentrate on work and life in a multinational society. The proposals had taken a year to create and were titled, "Agenda for a Feminist Government Power to Transform" - Betty Tola was another spokesperson for the group.
