= Juan Carlos Cassinelli =

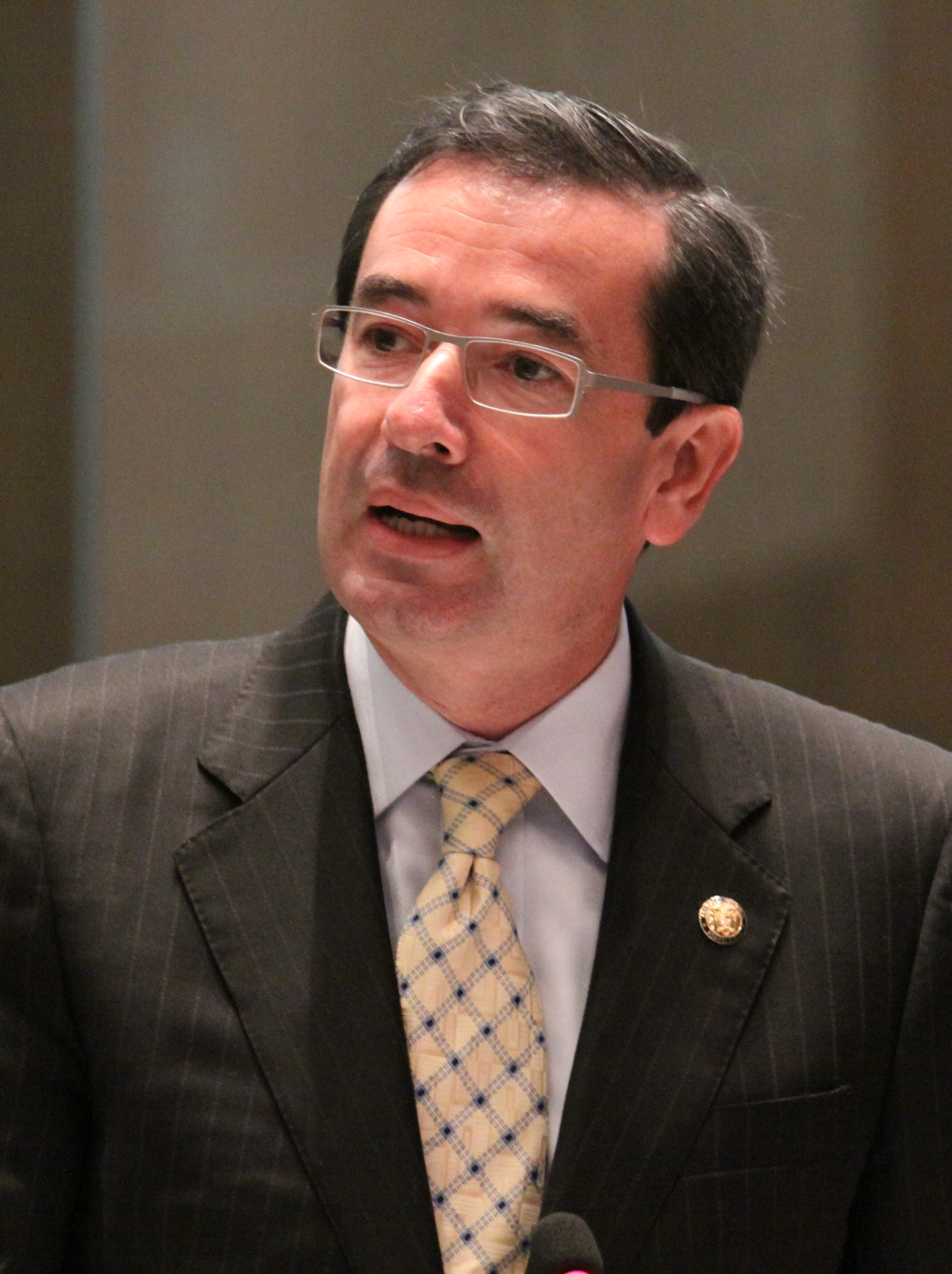
- Cassinelli in 2011

First Vice-President of the National Assembly of Ecuador
- In office August 11, 2011 – May 14, 2013
- President: Fernando Cordero
- Preceded by: Irina Cabezas
- Succeeded by: Rosana Alvarado

Minister of Foreign Trade
- In office May 4, 2016 – May 24, 2017
- Preceded by: Diego Aulestia Valencia
- Succeeded by: Pablo Campana

Personal details
- Born: Juan Carlos Cassinelli Cali; August 4, 1963 (age 63) Guayaquil, Ecuador
- Party: Alianza PAIS
- Education: Universidad Catolica de Santiago de Guayaquil

Juan Carlos Cassinelli Cali is an Ecuadorian lawyer and politician who served as the First Vice-President of the National Assembly from 2011 to 2013.

== Biography ==
Cassinelli began his primary studies at San Jose La Salle school in Guayaquil, where he was a classmate of Rafael Correa for ten years. He holds a JD from the Universidad Católica de Santiago de Guayaquil, where he was president of the student association of the faculty of law, at the same time as Correa was the leader of the school's student association of the faculty of economics.

In 2009, Cassinelli was elected to the National Assembly for Guayaquil under the Alianza PAIS party, assuming office on July 31. On August 11, 2011, Cassinelli was elected with 63 votes out of 124 to become the First Vice-President of the National Assembly. Cassinelli was voted out of this position in 2013, being replaced by fellow Alianza PAIS member Rosana Alvarado.

In early May 2016, Correa left his position as assemblyman after being appointed Minister of Foreign Trade by Correa's government. He held this position until 2017.
