= Amparo Menéndez-Carrión =

Uruguayan-Ecuadorian author and scholar

Amparo Menéndez-Carrión (born 1949 in Dolores, Soriano, Uruguay, and naturalized Ecuadorean) is an author and a scholar specialized in comparative politics and Latin American studies. She received her BA in Political Science at the University of Minnesota and her M.A. and Ph.D in International Relations and Comparative Politics at The Johns Hopkins University School of Advanced International Studies. She was Director General of FLACSO Ecuador (Latin American Graduate School of Social Sciences at Quito) for two consecutive terms (1987-1995) and has been a professor at the University of Chile and Macalester College. Her book La Conquista del Voto en Ecuador (Quito, FLACSO-CEN, 1986) was declared by her peers ‘Best Book of the Year in the Social Sciences’ (December 1986). Her most recent book (Memorias de Ciudadanía. Los Avatares de una Polis Golpeada. La Experiencia Uruguaya, Montevideo: Fin de Siglo, three-volumes, 2015) was recipient of the Bartolome Hidalgo award for non-fiction book of 2016 in Uruguay.

She has taught throughout the Americas and Europe, and has served as consultant to international organizations and foundations (UNDP, UNESCO, ILO, the Ford Foundation, among others).

== Academic career and research ==
In Ecuador, she was professor of International Relations and Director General of FLACSO Ecuador (Latin American Graduate School of Social Sciences at Quito) for two consecutive terms (1987-1991/1991-1995).In Chile she was Professor of Comparative Politics at the University of Chile's Graduate School of International Studies and at the Graduate School of Political Science. In Sweden she was Distinguished Visiting Professor at Götteborg University's Doctoral Program in Political Science. Among other visiting professorships in the United States, she was the Hubert H. Humphrey Distinguished Chair of International Studies at Macalester College (2000-2004).

Her earliest research focused on the Andean Region and, more recently, on the Southern Cone and the transformations of public space and citizenship in the new global era. She has published ten books as author or co-author, editor/co-editor, and more than sixty chapters and articles in collective volumes and international professional journals. Her first book, La Conquista del Voto en Ecuador (Quito, FLACSO-CEN, 1986) was declared by her peers ‘Best Book of the Year in the Social Sciences’ (December 1986). An Anthology of her work was published in 2007 (Repensar la Polis: del clientelismo al espacio público, Montevideo: CLAEH, 2007). Her most recent book (Memorias de Ciudadanía. Los Avatares de una Polis Golpeada. La Experiencia Uruguaya, Montevideo: Fin de Siglo, three-volumes, 2015) is the outcome of a major research project on the question of citizenship and public space (with Uruguay as case-study) carried out as Senior Visiting Fellow of the es:Centro Latinoamericano de Economía Humana (CLAEH) in Montevideo.

== Awards ==
Among the acknowledgements to her professional contributions: In 1995 the Inter-American Dialogue (Washington, D.C.) invited her to join the ‘Forum of Women Leaders of the Western Hemisphere’. In August 2008, President Michelle Bachelet made her the recipient of the ‘Order of Bernardo O’Higgins’ with the rank of Comendador, Chile's highest award for foreign citizens. In October (1st) 2016, her recently published trilogy was acknowledged as ‘Best Book of the Year’ (category: history) by a Jury of Peers convened by the Uruguayan Book Chamber (Uruguay's Chamber of Book Publishers and Distributors), making her the recipient of the ‘Premio Bartolomé Hidalgo 2016’, Uruguay's premier award to national authors.

== Selected published works ==
- Uruguay en el Siglo Incierto
- Memorias de Ciudadania: Avatares de una Polis Golpeada
- Revisiting the Polis amidst shifting sands. The places and spaces of citizenship and the public in the new global era.
- La Conquista del Voto: De Velasco a Roldos
- Violencia en la Region Andina: El Caso de Ecuador
- Ecuador: La Democracia Esquiva
- La democracia en el Ecuador: desafíos, dilemmas y perspectivas Antdemocracia
- El lugar de la ciudadanía en los entornos de hoy : Una mirada desde américa Latina El lugar de la ciudadanía en los entornos de hoy: Una mirada desde américa latina
- Repensar la polis. Del clientelismo al espacio público. Compilación y estudio introductorio de Paulo Ravecca

== Music ==
Menéndez-Carrión combines her scholarly activities with the Performing Arts. In September 2018 she performed as piano soloist in the first performance in Ecuador of George Gershwin´s Concerto in F (Gershwin) conducted by maestro Alvaro Manzano and the Orquesta Sinfonica Nacional del Ecuador. In November 2014 she teamed up with Japanese violinist Kazuhiro Takagi (Concertmaster of the Dallas Chamber Symphony Orchestra), to offer an evening of chamber music at Tokyo’s Suntory Hall. The proceeds of Forever Gaia benefited two non-profit organizations ‒moreTrees and The Tohoku Youth Orchestra‒ chaired by world-acclaimed Japanese composer, conductor, performer, screen-actor and peace activist Ryuichi Sakamoto. Forever Gaia II (December 15, 2016) marked her second performance at Suntory Hall, along with concertmaster Takagi. All proceeds benefited the reconstruction efforts of Architect-Humanitarian Shigeru Ban and the Voluntary Architects Network (VAN) in Ecuador’s April 2016 earthquake-stricken areas. Her first composition for piano was commissioned by Argentine film-maker Lalo Gargano and is featured in ‘34’, a Japanese/Argentine independent-film production (2015). In 2019 she teamed with french-horn player Tigrán Ter-Minasyan, performing in Casa de la Musica.
