= Johana Pesántez =

Ecuadorian politician (born 1975)

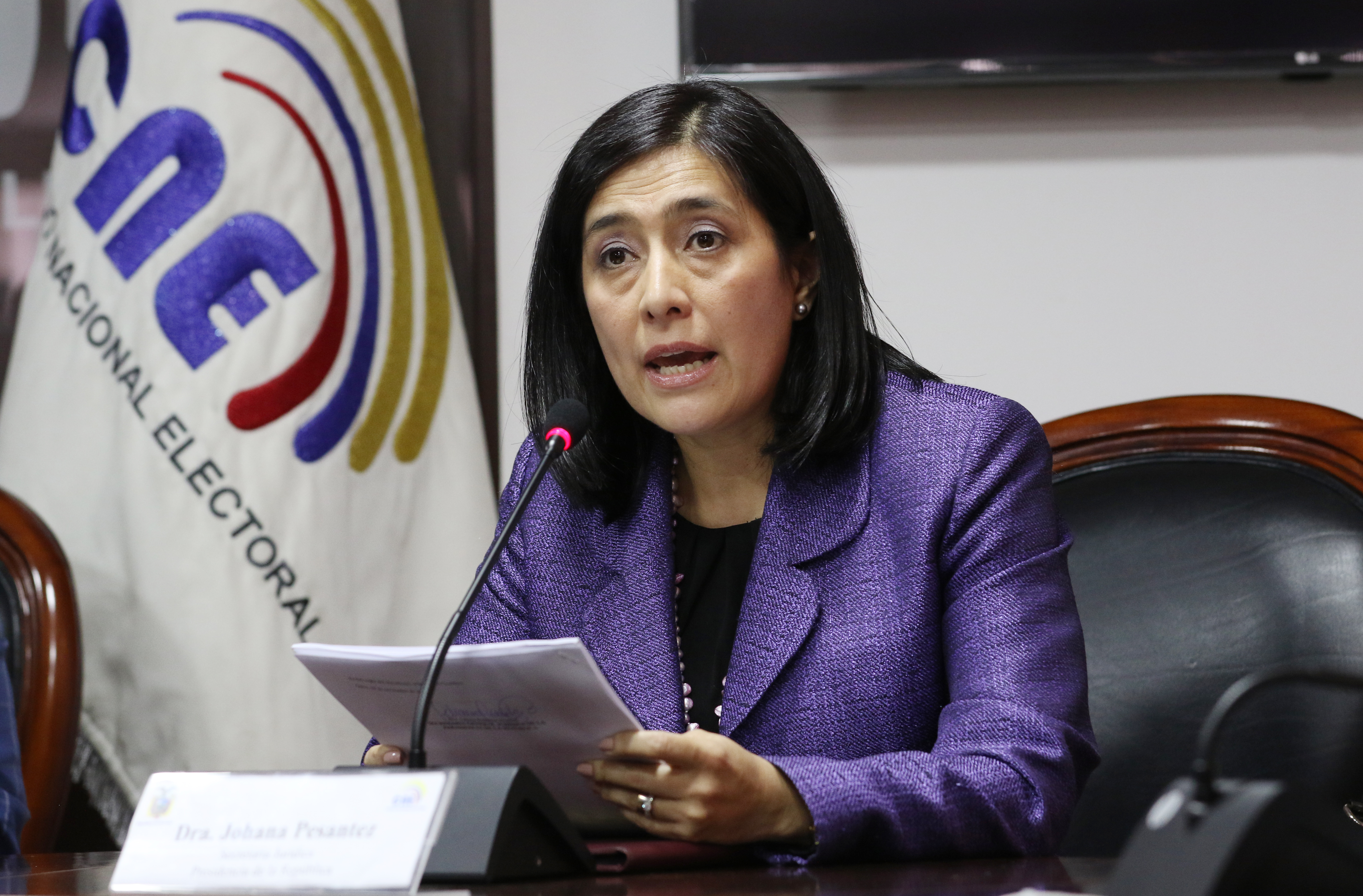

Minister of Justice, Human Rights and Religious Affairs
- In office 13 May 2011 – 18 June 2013
- President: Rafael Correa
- Preceded by: José Serrano
- Succeeded by: Lenin Lara

Personal details
- Born: 20 November 1975 (age 50) Quito, Ecuador
- Education: Pablo de Olavide University; Sapienza University of Rome; Pontificia Universidad Católica del Ecuador

Johana Farina Pesántez Benítez (born 20 November 1975) is an Ecuadorian politician, she was Minister of Justice, Human Rights and Religious Affairs between 13 May 2011 and 18 June 2013. Since 24 May 2017 she has been judicial advisor to President Lenín Moreno.

== Personal life ==
Johana Pesántez was born on 20 November 1975 in Quito. Pesántez speaks five languages, besides her native Spanish they are English, Portuguese, French and Italian.

== Education ==
Pesántez has a licentiate in Juridical Science and a doctorate in jurisprudence by the Pontificia Universidad Católica del Ecuador. She has a postgraduate degree in Roman Right by the Sapienza University of Rome and a doctorate in 'Current programs in criminal law and criminology' by the Pablo de Olavide University. Between 2003 and 2011 Pesántez was a Law professor in the Pontificia Universidad Católica del Ecuador and the Universidad de las Américas. She also worked shorter periods for Universidad Tecnológica Indoamérica and the Universidad Técnica Particular de Loja.

== Political career ==
From 2008 to 2011 Pesántez was Interinstitutional Judicial Advisor of the National Directorate of Judicial Advisors to the Presidency of the National Court of Justice. Between January and May 2011 Pesántez was judicial advisor to the President of Ecuador, Rafael Correa. In May 2011 she was named Minister of Justice, Human Rights and Religious Affairs. During her term as Minister she was confronted with the severe overcrowding of prisons and several escapes by detainees. On the topic of human rights, Pesántez sees the Universal Periodic Review, a mechanism of the United Nations Human Rights Council, as a good system for Ecuador to strengthen its democracy. In 2012, 97% of the recommendations made to Ecuador via this system were supposed to be implemented by the government. On 28 and 29 November 2012 Ecuador hosted the Ninth Meeting of Justice Ministers of the Organization of American States. Pesántez inaugurated the meeting together with the Secretary General of the OAS, José Miguel Insulza. Her term in office ended on 18 June 2013 when she was replaced as Minister by Lenin Lara.

In July 2015 she was one of three possible candidates proposed by the legislative branch for a seat on the Constitutional Tribunal of Ecuador. In October 2015 she was not among those chosen. When Lenín Moreno took over the Presidency of Ecuador of Rafael Correa on 24 May 2017 he appointed Pesántez in his second decree as judicial advisor (Spanish:Secretaria General Jurídica) to the President. She succeeded Alexis Mera in this position. In November 2019, after José Agusto Briones resigned as general secretary (Spanish:Secretaría General) of the Presidency she also became caretaker of this position. As of 30 August 2020 she was the only person of the original Moreno cabinet to remain in the same function.
