= Caras y Caretas (Uruguay) =

Uruguayan weekly news magazine

- Editor: Mateo Grille Coronel
- Categories: Current affairs
- Frequency: Weekly
- Founded: 2001
- First issue: 3 August 2001
- Country: Uruguay
- Website: carasycaretas.com.uy

Caras y Caretas is an Uruguayan weekly news magazine specialized in current affairs.

== History ==
Caras y Caretas published its first edition on 3 August 2001. In February 2017, a reporter for the magazine had her head grazed by a bullet shot by two individuals on a motorcycle, according to the Committee to Protect Journalists.

In 2020, the magazine launched a streaming service that had about 20,000 subscribers, with its main program being titled "Legitimate defense".

By its twentieth anniversary in 2021, it had published 1,027 consecutive editions every Friday. A twentieth anniversary edition of the magazine was placed in the Legislative Library of Uruguay. In 2021, Caras y Caretas criticized President Luis Lacalle Pou, saying that the president sought to see the magazine "dead."

In 2023, prosecutor Gabriela Fossati filed a defamation complaint against Alberto Grille, director of Caras y Caretas, after he described her as a "cowardice" with her verdict against Alejandro Astesiano, the security chief of President Luis Lacalle Pou.

== Reception ==
Página 12 described Caras y Caretas as "a benchmark of journalism" and "one of the most important references of independent journalism in Uruguay."
