= Doris Soliz =

Ecuadorian politician (born 1958)

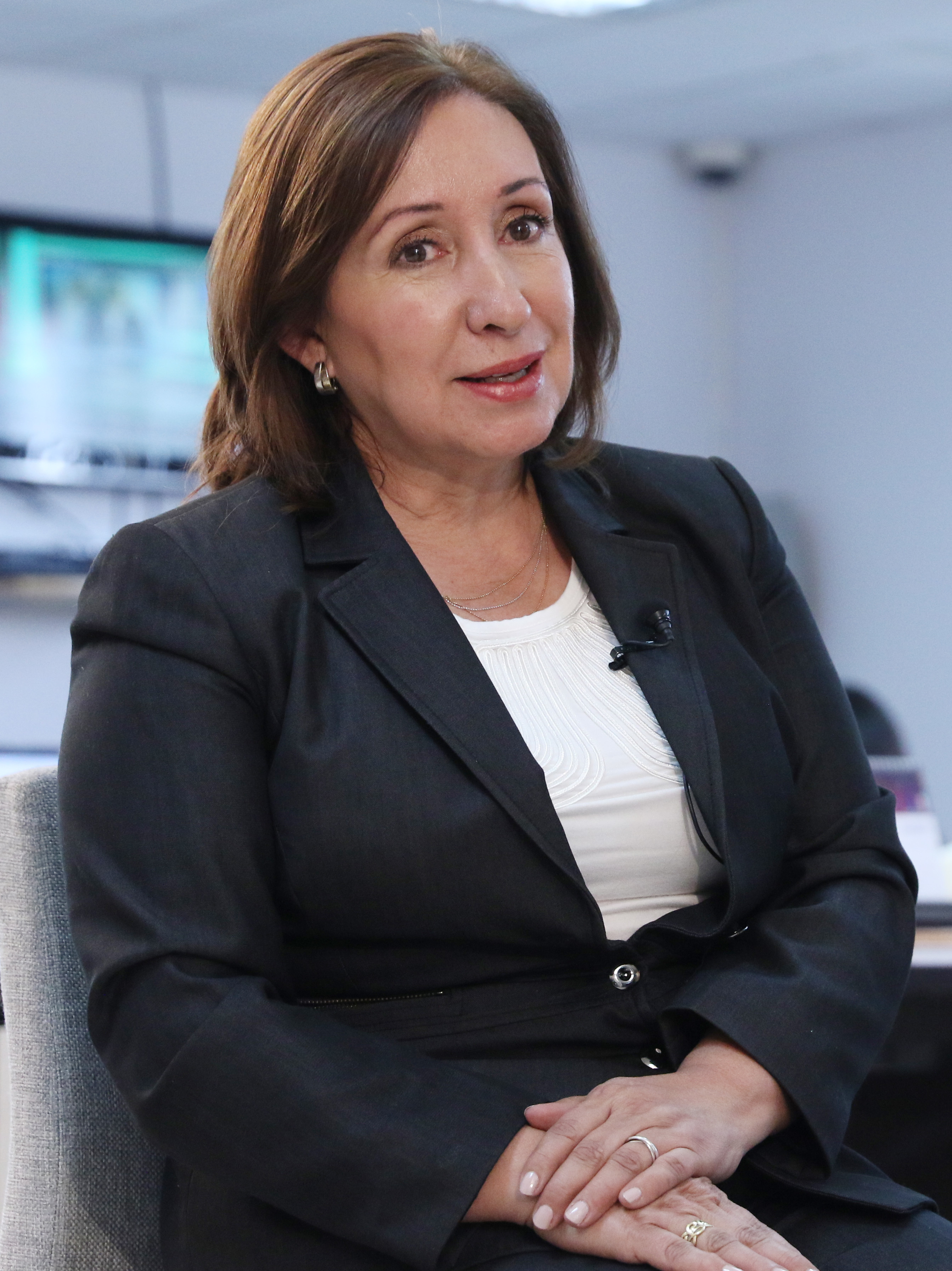
- Born: 2 March 1958 (age 68); Cuenca, Ecuador
- Occupation: politician
- Known for: Government minister and Executive Secretary of her party, Alianza País
- Political party: Alianza País

Doris Soliz (born 2 March 1958) is an Ecuadorian politician who has been a Government minister and Executive Secretary of Alianza País.

== Life ==
Soliz was born in Cuenca in 1958.

From 2000 to 2002 she was Vice Mayor of Cuenca. In 2003, during the government of Lucio Gutiérrez, she was Minister of Tourism.

In 2011 in the power struggle that saw Rafael Correa take over the leadership of the Alianza Pais party, a National board was created. Soliz was one of the 22 members of that board which included Irina Cabezas, Nancy Morocho, María Luisa Moreno, Dora Aguirre, Jorge Loor, Gabriela Rivadeneira and Patricia Sarzoza. She had been the Coordinating Minister of Politics and Decentralized Autonomous Governments but in November 2011 that position was taken by Betty Tola.

In April 2012 she became the Minister of Economic and Social Inclusion.

She resigned as the Minister of Economic and Social Inclusion in 2016 to become the Executive Secretary of her party, Alianza País. She started drawing up lists of militants which was in line with previous position that the President Rafael Correa had made.

In the elections of 19 February 2017, she was elected as an assembly member for Azuay Province and she was soon appointed president of the Commission on Sovereignty, Integration, International Relations and Integral Security.

In 2019 the attorney general Diana Salazar was conducting investigations into illegal bribery payments. Doris Soliz, María Soledad Buendía, Edwin Jarrín and Ítalo Centanaro who had been part of Rafael Correa's government were asked to comment on information that had come to light from a computer that had belonged to Laura Ternan when she was an assistant to the Presidency of the Republic.
