= Abortion in Ecuador =

Abortion in Ecuador is illegal except when performed in the case of a threat to the life or health of a pregnant woman (when this threat cannot be averted by other means) or when the pregnancy is the result of rape, including but not only a sexual crime against a mentally disabled woman where her legal representative has consented to the abortion. In 2021, the Constitutional Court of Ecuador ruled for the decriminalization of abortion in all cases of rape.

The Ministry of Public Health provides guidelines on therapeutic abortion.

In 2013 then president Rafael Correa threatened to resign if the abortion law was liberalized. As of 2015, nearly 100 criminal cases of illegal abortion were under investigation.

In 2015, Ecuador was urged by CEDAW to decriminalize abortion in cases of rape and incest (under law abortion at the time it was legal only if the woman is mentally disabled) and severe fetal impairment (which is also illegal).

== Public opinion ==
Opinion polling conducted in Ecuador in May 2021 indicated that 69% of the Ecuadorian public support legal abortion in the case of rape and 76.3% disagree with a woman going to jail if they get an abortion.

== See also ==
- Abortion by country
- Abortion law
- Reproductive rights in Latin America
