= Viviana Bonilla =

Ecuadorian lawyer and politician

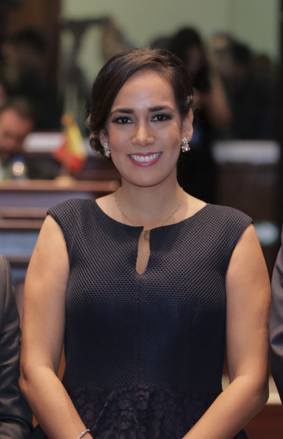

Vice President of the National Assembly of Ecuador
- In office 14 May 2017 – 14 May 2019

Personal details
- Born: Viviana Patricia Bonilla Salcedo; 3 October 1983 (age 42) Guayaquil
- Party: PAIS Alliance
- Education: Universidad Católica de Santiago de Guayaquil
- Occupation: Politician, lawyer

Viviana Patricia Bonilla Salcedo (born 3 October 1983) is an Ecuadorian lawyer and politician. She was a National Assemblywoman and First Vice President of the National Assembly of Ecuador. She was dismissed from the National Assembly in September 2020.

== Life ==
Born in Guayaquil, Bonilla graduated with a law degree from the Universidad Católica de Santiago de Guayaquil, and also obtained a master's degree in Public Administration. After graduating, she served as legal counsel to the Servicio de Rentas Internas, Ecuador's Internal Revenue Service, as well as the Ministry of the Coast.

In 2009, Bonilla was elected to the National Assembly as a member of the PAIS Alliance out of Guayas Province, and was originally placed on the ballot by PAIS as the party wanted to increase the number of younger elected officials. She was part of the Economic and Tax Commission and Supervisory Committee during her term in the Assembly. In 2010, she married Gustavo Mora Córdova. A year later, there was a referendum in Guayas, which removed then-governor Roberto Cuero from power; Bonilla won the election, becoming the second woman and youngest person to govern the province. During her time as governor, she restructured the police. She remained governor of Guayas until November 2013, when she decided to run for mayor of Guayaquil in the 2014 elections against incumbent Jaime Nebot; she lost the race with 39% of the vote to Nebot's 59%.

After losing the mayoral race, Bonilla was named National Secretary of Policy Management, replacing Betty Tola. She held the position until January 2016, when she resigned to take maternity leave. After a year off, she returned to politics, winning a spot in the National Assembly in 2017, and being named Vice President of the Assembly.

She was dismissed from the National Assembly in September 2020 following a bribery case that involved the President, Rafael Correa, and the vice-president, Jorge Glas.
