= Fernando Cordero =

Fernando Cordero is the name of:

- Fernando Cordero (footballer) (born 1987), Chilean footballer
- Fernando Cordero Rusque (died 2020), Chilean military officer and politician
- Fernando Cordero Cueva, born 1952, Ecuadorian politician
