= Gina Godoy =

Ecuadorian politician and feminist

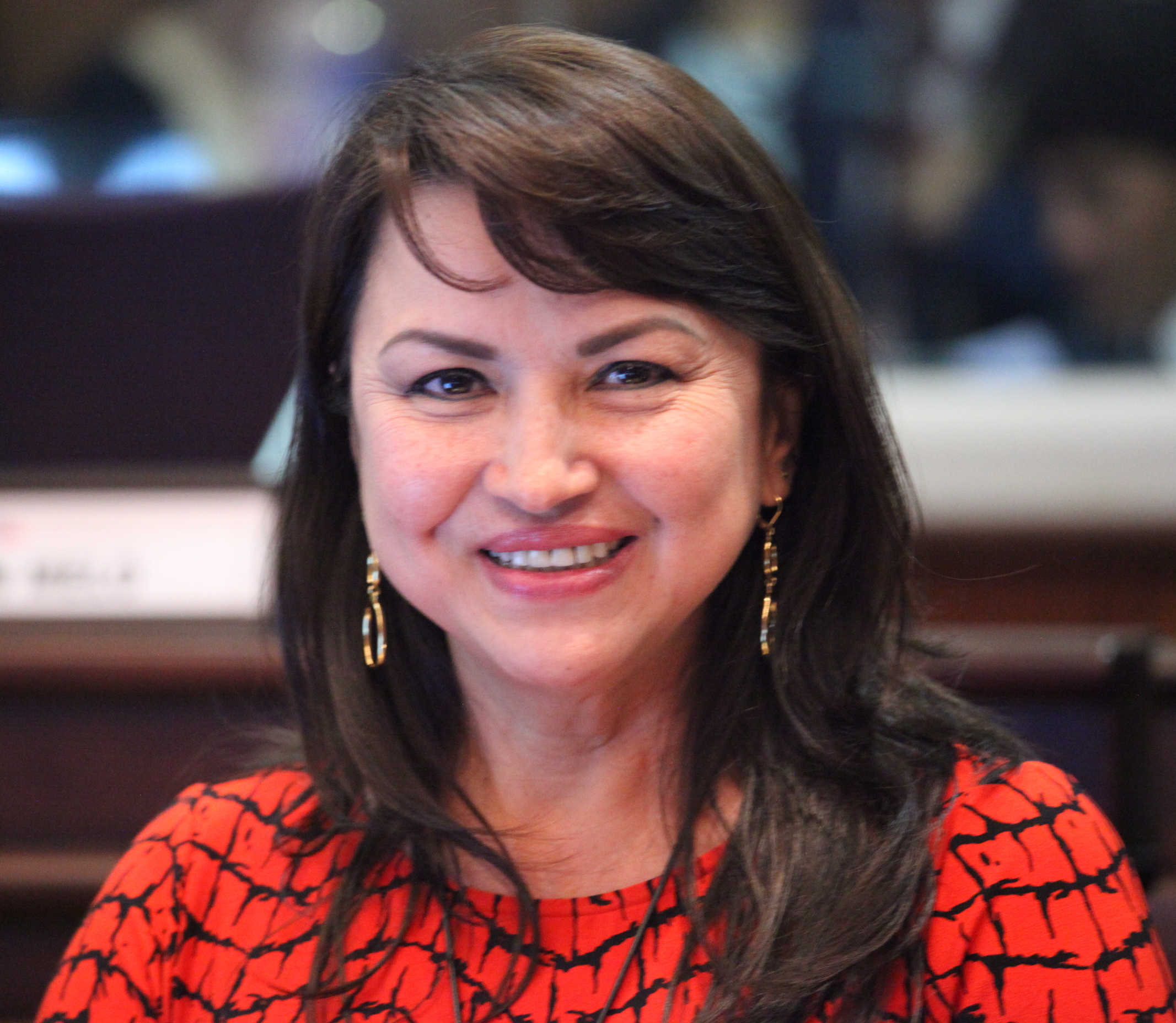
Gina Godoy in 2013

Gina Godoy Andrade (born 26 April 1962) is an Ecuadorian politician, feminist and supporter of LGBTQ rights. She is currently the representative in the National Assembly for the province of Guayas and is the vice president of the Justice Commission of the Assembly.

== Biography ==
Godoy was born in the town of Chone on 26 April 1962. Since 1997, she has been a member of the Ecuadorian Centre for the Promotion and Action of Women (Cepam), which is centered with respect to the defense of the rights of women, children and adolescents. Godoy was the representative for the Province of Guayas in the Ecuador Constituent Assembly of 2007 and 2008 for the PAIS Alliance social movement party. In the legislative elections in Ecuador, 2009 she was elected as assembly person for the Province of Guayas. During this period, Godoy prompted laws in favor of human rights and particularly women, as well as a law on trafficking, and the criminalisation of femicide as a particular type of criminal offence. She sought reelection in the legislative elections of Ecuador in 2013 and reintroduced her main proposals on projects regarding women's rights. She and Paola Pabón presented a motion to the National Assembly to discuss the decriminalization of abortion in cases of rape. The motion was supported by nineteen other members of the governing party, including Rosana Alvarado who was the vice president of the legislature, but the motion was opposed by the President.

Once reelected, she became the vice president of the Justice Commission of the Assembly.

== Activism ==
Godoy has participated in several times acts in favour of women's and LGBT rights groups. During the debate on the criminalisation of femicide as a criminal offence in 2011, she was one of the two assembly people who received a manifesto delivered by more than 50 social organisations demanding that femicide be considered as a crime. In addition, she has attended the march by the pride parade in the city of Guayaquil several times, and supports same-sex marriage.
