= Lenin Lara =

Ecuadorean politician and lawyer

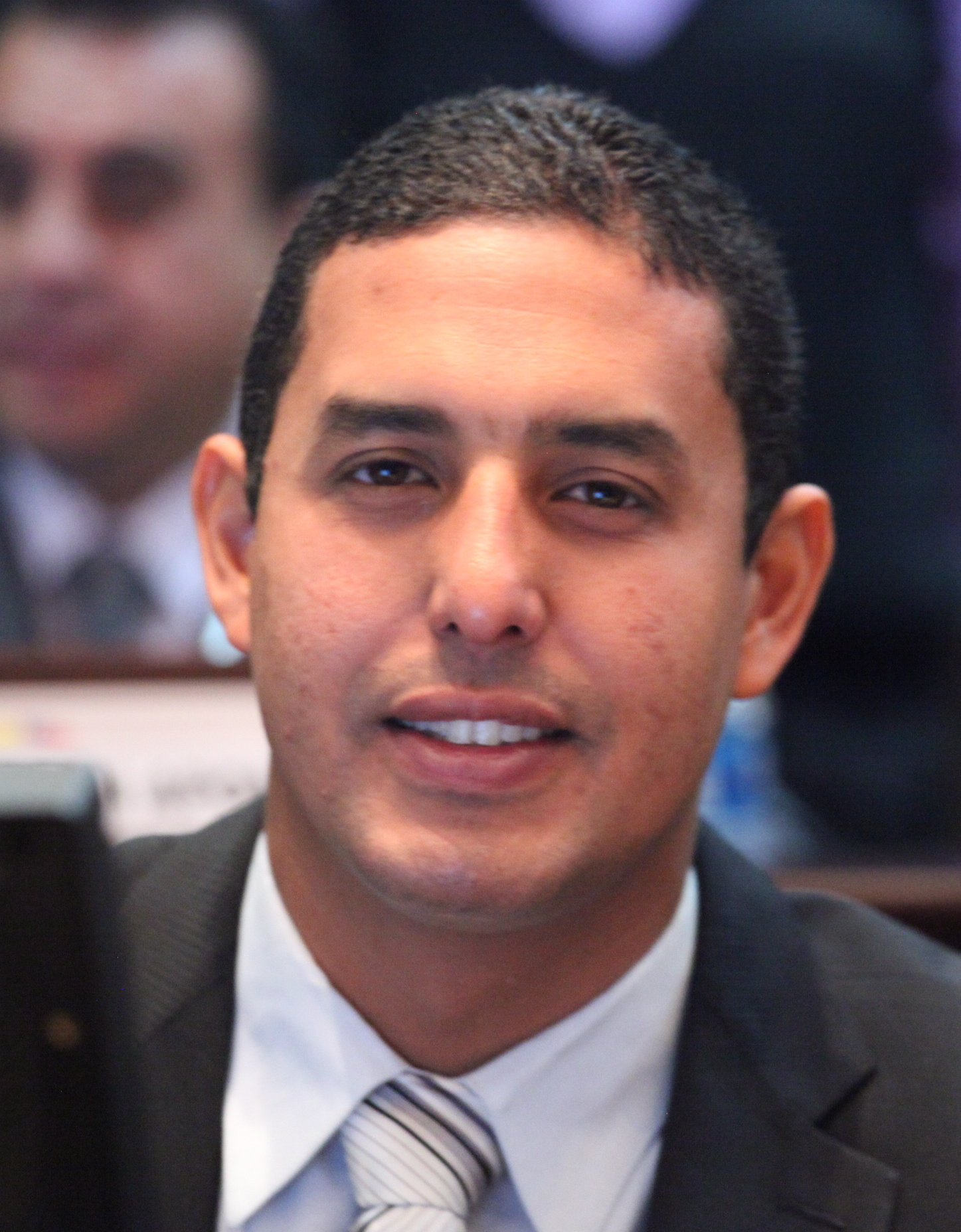
- In 2013

Member of the National Assembly
- Incumbent
- Assumed office 17 November 2023
- Constituency: Esmeraldas Province
- In office 14 May 2021 – 17 May 2023
- In office 14 May 2013 – 19 June 2013

Mayor of Esmeraldas
- In office 14 May 2014 – 14 May 2019
- Preceded by: Ernesto Estupiñán
- Succeeded by: Lucía Sosa

Minister of Justice, Human Rights, and Religious Affairs
- In office 19 June 2013 – 19 November 2013
- President: Rafael Correa
- Preceded by: Johanna Pesántez
- Succeeded by: Ledy Zúñiga

Governor of Esmeraldas Province
- In office 2010 – 13 November 2012
- Preceded by: Jorge Chiriboga Mosquera
- Succeeded by: Rafael Lemos Ramírez

Personal details
- Born: Lenin José Lara Rivadeneira; 9 March 1979 (age 47) Esmeraldas, Ecuador
- Party: PAIS Alliance; Democratic Center Movement; Citizen Revolution Movement
- Education: Central University of Ecuador
- Occupation: Writer, lawyer, politician

Lenin José Lara Rivadeneira (born 9 March 1979) is an Ecuadorian writer, lawyer, and politician.

== Biography ==
Lenin Lara was born Esmeraldas on 9 March 1979. His parents were the politician Antonio Lara Quiñónez and writer Carmen Rivadeneira Bustos. He completed his secondary studies at the Instituto Superior 5 de Agosto, and his higher education at the Central University of Ecuador, where he earned a law degree. During his formative years, he was involved in student leadership, serving as president of the student council in high school and president of the law student association at the university.

He entered public life in 2008 as regional manager of the Institute of Educational Credit and Scholarships (IECE) in Esmeraldas.

In 2010, Lara was appointed governor of Esmeraldas Province, holding the position until 2012.

In the 2013 parliamentary election, he was elected to the National Assembly representing Esmeraldas Province for the PAIS Alliance. A few months later, he left his seat in the legislature and was appointed Minister of Justice, Human Rights, and Religious Affairs by President Rafael Correa.

In November 2013, Lara resigned from his position to run as a candidate for mayor of Esmeraldas in the following year's local elections for PAIS Alliance, succeeding with 46% of the vote. In the 2019 elections, he sought reelection as mayor, but was defeated by Lucía Sosa.

In the 2021 parliamentary election, he won a new term as a legislator in the National Assembly, representing the Democratic Center Movement. For the early 2023-2025 legislative term, following the "cross-dissolution" decreed by former Ecuadorian President Guillermo Lasso, Lara was re-elected as a National Assemblyman representing Esmeraldas for the Citizen Revolution Movement, a position he has held since November 2023.

== Literary career ==
Lara co-authored the short story collection El noveroso transcurrir and wrote the novel La otra ciudad, winner of the Medardo Ángel Silva national short novel competition.
