= Latin American Faculty of Social Sciences =

Regional University System

- Facultad Latinoamericana de Ciencias Sociales
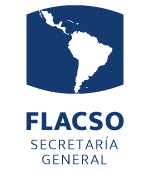

- Building on Ecuador main campus
- Formation: 16 April 1957; 69 years ago
- Headquarters: San José, Costa Rica
- Official languages: Spanish and Portuguese
- Secretary General: Josette Altmann Borbón
- Website: flacso.org

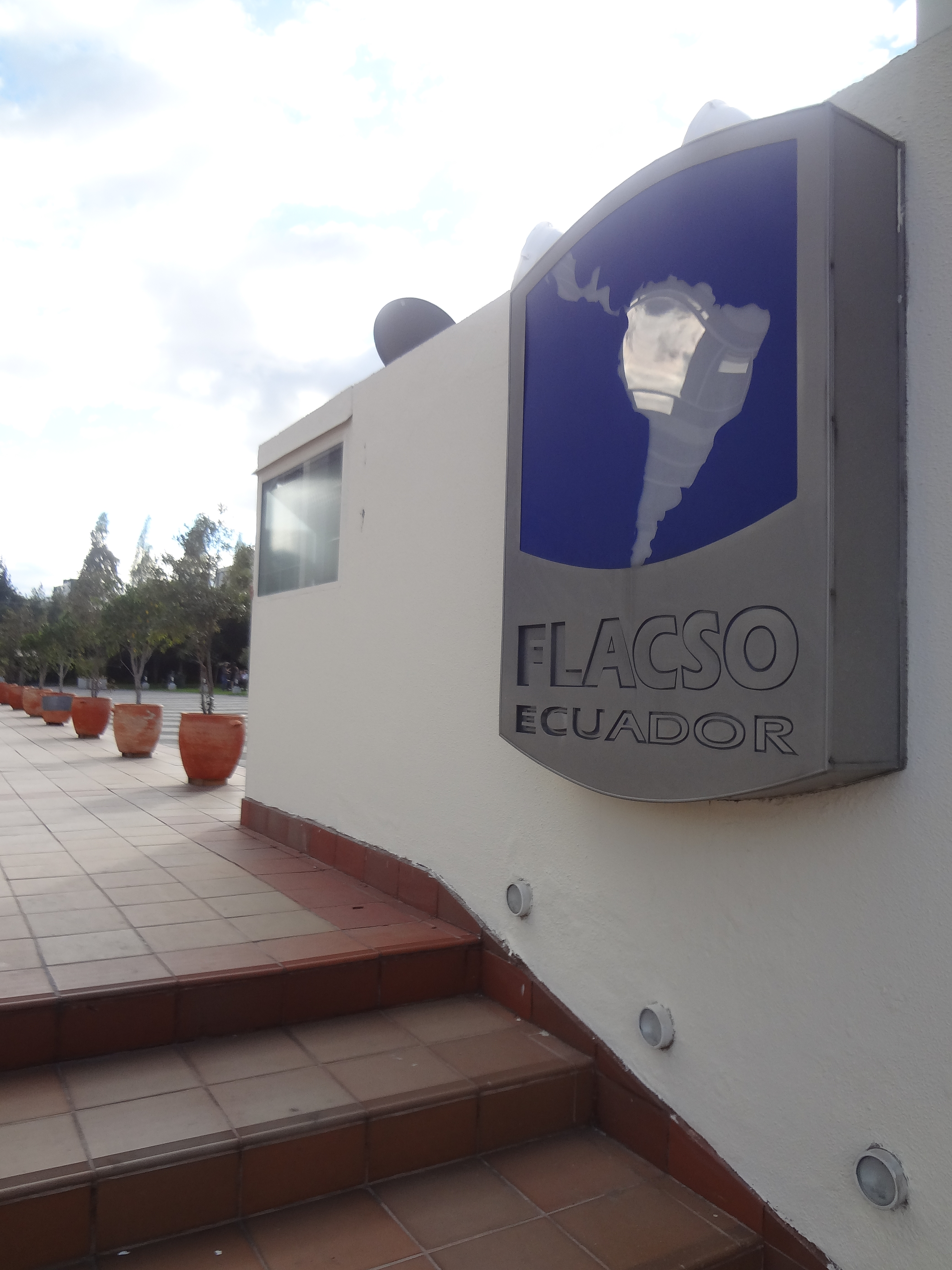
FLACSO, Ecuador

The Latin American Faculty of Social Sciences (Spanish: Facultad Latinoamericana de Ciencias Sociales, Portuguese: Faculdade Latino-Americana de Ciências Sociais or FLACSO) is a graduate-only university and inter-governmental autonomous organization for Latin America dedicated to research, teaching and spreading of social sciences. Headquartered in Costa Rica, it has several campuses and centers spread across Latin America.

It was created on April 17, 1957, following a UNESCO initiative at the Latin American Conference on Social Sciences in Rio de Janeiro. Its goal was to promote academic research and development in the region.

Its membership is open to Latin American and Caribbean countries that subscribe to the FLACSO agreement. Current members include: Argentina, Bolivia, Brazil, Costa Rica, Cuba, Chile, Ecuador, Honduras, Guatemala, Mexico, Nicaragua, Panama, Dominican Republic, Suriname and Uruguay.

Josette Altmann Borbón, a historian and former First Lady of Costa Rica, was elected Secretary General of FLACSO in June 2016. She succeeded Manuel González on July 31, 2016.

== Notable people ==
- Fernando Henrique Cardoso – Professor at FLACSO Chile (1964–1967); received honorary doctorate from FLACSO (2001); former President of Brazil (1995–2003)
- Juan Carlos Portantiero – Professor and researcher at FLACSO Buenos Aires (1974–1975) and FLACSO Mexico (during exile); received honorary doctorate from FLACSO (2006); Argentine sociologist and Dean of Faculty of Social Sciences, University of Buenos Aires (1990–1998)
- Ricardo Lagos – Secretary General of FLACSO Chile (1971–1973) and FLACSO Argentina (1974); received honorary doctorate from FLACSO (2006); President of Chile (2000–2006)
- Paulina Aulestia – Specialization in Gender and Development, FLACSO Ecuador (2010); first Ecuadorian woman to summit Mount Everest (2013)
- Paolina Vercoutere - Governor of Imbabura Province (Ecuador)
- Teresita de Barbieri
- Fernando Cortés Cáceres
- Carmen Diana Deere
- Ricardo Lagos Escobar
- Enrique Correa
- Geraldina Guerra Garcés, women's rights activist and campaigner against femicide
- Elke Gryglewski, German political scientist and historian
- Hilda Herzer
- Amparo Menendez-Carrion
- Suzana Prates
- Gentiana Susaj, human rights lawyer and aikidoka
