= Legislative Library of Uruguay =

Legislative library in Montevideo, Uruguay

- Biblioteca del Poder Legislativo
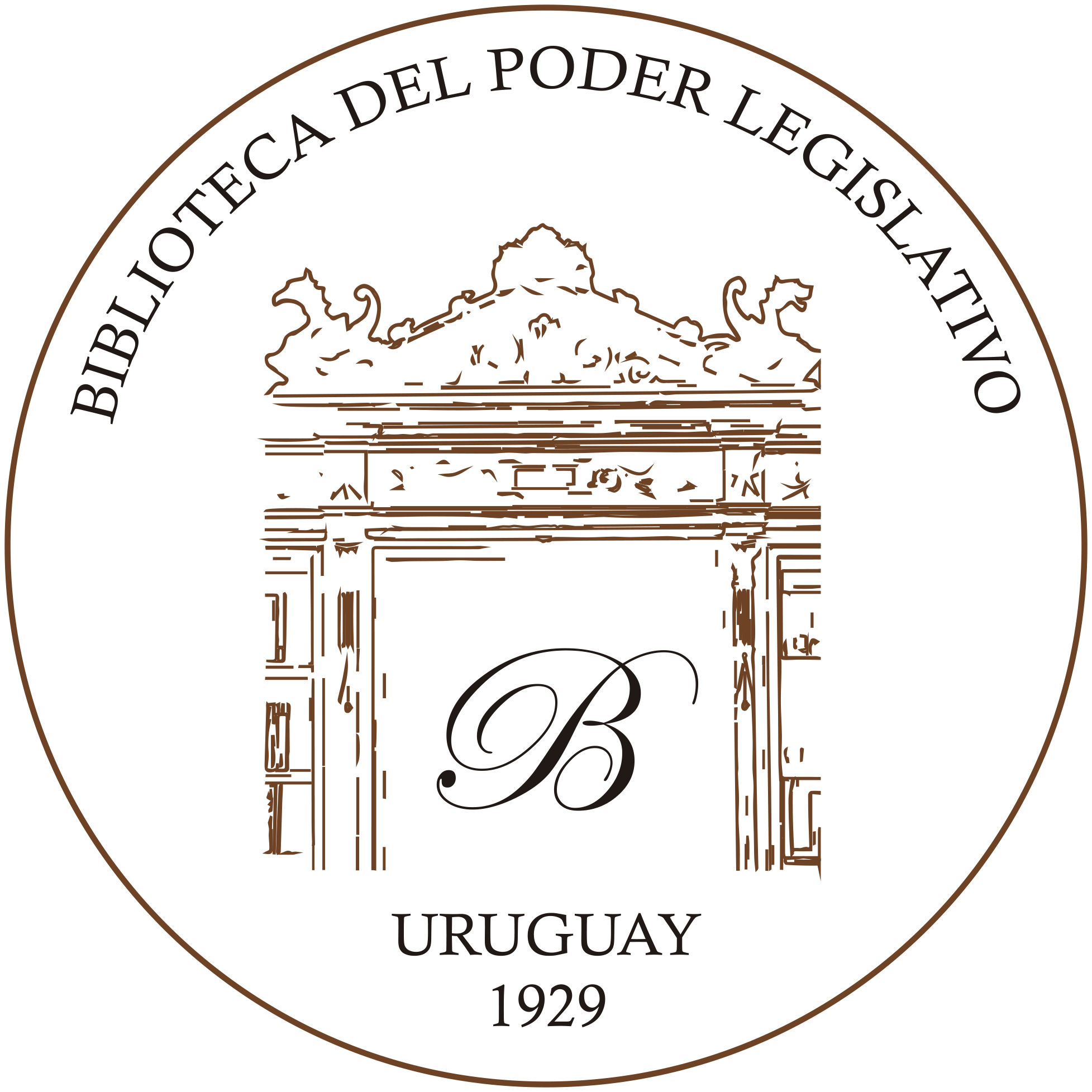

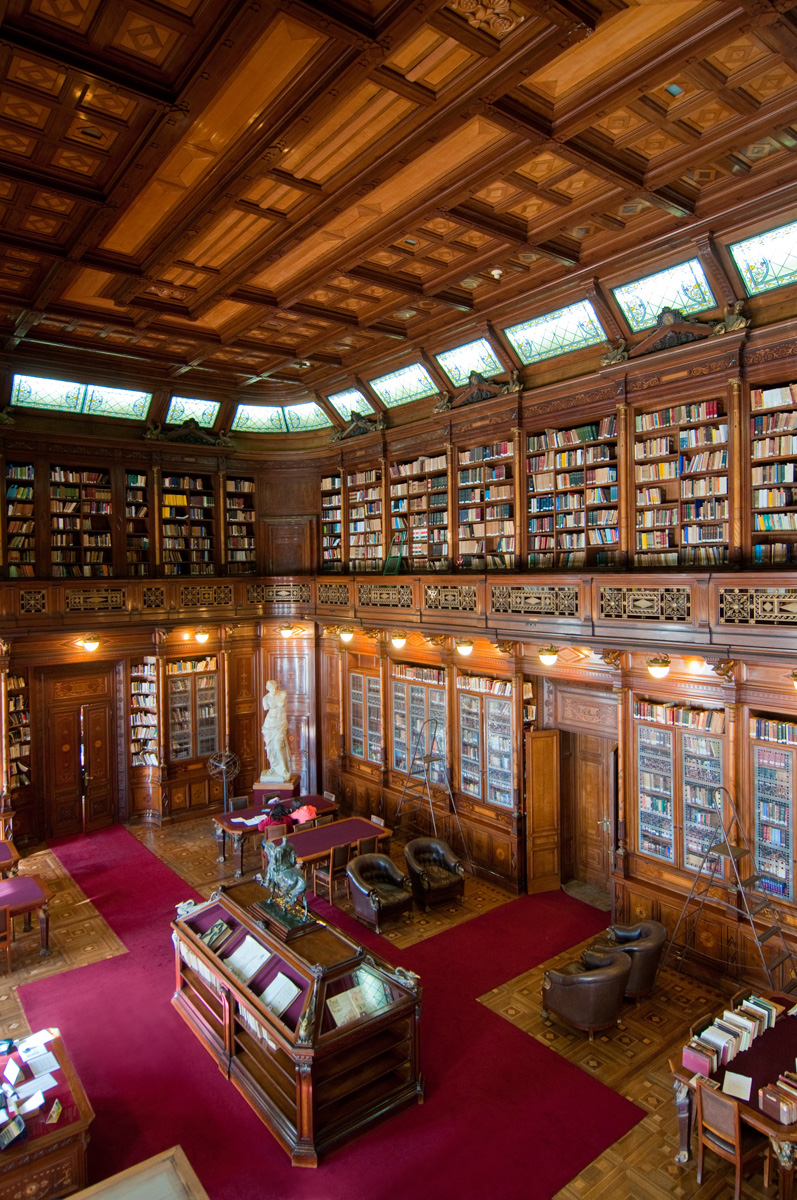
- 34°53′28″S 56°11′14″W
- Location: Avenida de las Leyes s/n Montevideo, Uruguay
- Type: Parliamentary library

Other information
- Website: biblioteca.parlamento.gub.uy/biblioteca/

The Legislative Library of Uruguay (Spanish: Biblioteca del Poder Legislativo de Uruguay) was established in 1929 after the fusion of the libraries of the Senate and that of the House of Representatives.

It is housed in the Legislative Palace, Montevideo and is second in importance to the National Library of Uruguay.
