= Foreign relations of Ecuador =

This article describes the diplomatic affairs, foreign policy and international relations of Ecuador.

Ecuador is a founding member of the UN and a member of many of its specialized agencies; it is also a member of the Organization of American States (OAS), as well as many regional groups, including the Rio Group, the Latin American Economic System, the Latin American Energy Organization, the Latin American Integration Association, and the Andean Pact.

Ecuador's principal foreign-policy objectives have traditionally included defense of its territory from both external aggression and internal subversion as well as support for the objectives of the UN and the OAS. Although Ecuador's foreign relations were traditionally centered on the United States, Ecuador's membership in the Organization of Petroleum Exporting Countries (OPEC) in the 1970s and 1980s allowed Ecuadorian leaders to exercise somewhat greater foreign policy autonomy. Ecuador's foreign policy goals under the Borja government in the late 1980s were more diversified than those of the Febres Cordero administration, which closely identified with the United States. For example, Ecuador was more active in its relations with the Third World, multilateral organizations, Western Europe, and socialist countries.

Ecuador has offered humanitarianian aid to many countries, is a supporter of the United Nations, and currently contributes troops to the UN mission in Haiti. Ecuador has also been an elective member of the UN Security Council.

In Antarctica, Ecuador has maintained a peaceful research station for scientific study in the British-claimed territory and is a member nation of the Antarctica Treaty.

== Domestic politics ==
The presidency of Rafael Correa in the early 21st century saw a radical change in the country's foreign policy. Traditional ties with the United States grew more acrimonious and there were increased ties with the governments of Russia and Iran. The relations with the United States, however, improved significantly during the presidency of his successor Lenin Moreno since 2017.

=== List ===
List of countries which Ecuador maintains diplomatic relations with:

#	Country	Date
1	Peru	26 September 1831
2	Colombia	10 February 1832
3	Chile	26 April 1835
4	Venezuela	18 August 1835
—	Mexico (suspended)	15 November 1837
5	Spain	16 February 1840
6	Bolivia	7 April 1842
7	Brazil	22 November 1844
8	France	12 February 1848
9	United States	12 August 1848
10	United Kingdom	29 January 1853
11	Netherlands	12 May 1872
—	Holy See	6 August 1877
12	Belgium	16 July 1879
13	Paraguay	15 December 1880
14	Costa Rica	26 October 1885
15	Guatemala	26 October 1885
—	Nicaragua (suspended)	26 October 1885
16	Uruguay	15 December 1887
17	Switzerland	22 June 1888
18	El Salvador	29 March 1890
19	Honduras	1896
20	Italy	12 August 1900
21	Argentina	27 March 1903
22	Cuba	24 April 1903
23	Panama	1 September 1908
24	Japan	26 August 1918
25	Sweden	21 September 1931
26	Czech Republic	12 March 1935
27	Poland	5 August 1935
28	Norway	22 October 1936
29	Dominican Republic	14 April 1937
30	Russia	16 June 1945
31	Hungary	3 January 1946
32	Austria	27 June 1947
33	Portugal	28 August 1948
34	Lebanon	15 September 1948
35	Denmark	22 September 1948
36	Haiti	14 November 1949
37	Turkey	21 September 1950
38	Germany	4 July 1952
—	Sovereign Military Order of Malta	29 July 1953
39	Serbia	10 January 1956
40	Luxembourg	24 April 1956
41	Israel	18 June 1957
42	Egypt	8 November 1960
43	Canada	March 1961
44	South Korea	5 October 1962
45	Finland	5 February 1965
46	Morocco	22 April 1966
47	Greece	5 July 1966
48	Trinidad and Tobago	9 November 1967
49	Romania	12 November 1968
50	India	November 1969
51	Bulgaria	28 April 1971
52	Algeria	2 July 1973
53	Iran	19 July 1973
54	Jamaica	10 September 1973
55	Iraq	10 February 1974
56	Guyana	2 July 1974
57	Australia	3 February 1975
58	United Arab Emirates	9 June 1975
59	Qatar	20 June 1975
60	Kuwait	30 July 1975
61	Philippines	5 July 1976
62	Bahamas	27 April 1978
63	Suriname	22 June 1978
64	Barbados	23 June 1978
65	Libya	30 August 1978
66	New Zealand	25 September 1978
67	Ghana	12 May 1979
68	Grenada	June 1979
69	Pakistan	23 July 1979
70	Kenya	12 October 1979
71	Nigeria	10 December 1979
72	Cyprus	14 December 1979
73	Jordan	1 January 1980
74	Malta	1 January 1980
75	Saint Lucia	1 January 1980
76	Vietnam	1 January 1980
77	China	2 January 1980
78	Thailand	15 January 1980
79	Tunisia	29 January 1980
80	Albania	31 January 1980
81	Togo	11 February 1980
82	Republic of the Congo	12 February 1980
83	Democratic Republic of the Congo	29 February 1980
84	Liberia	31 March 1980
85	Indonesia	29 April 1980
86	Senegal	25 August 1980
87	Equatorial Guinea	8 September 1980
88	Gabon	11 November 1980
89	Oman	9 July 1982
90	Mongolia	30 October 1982
91	Bangladesh	28 February 1983
92	Saint Vincent and the Grenadines	1 August 1989
93	Namibia	12 July 1990
94	Afghanistan	23 August 1990
95	Seychelles	6 December 1991
96	Lithuania	20 October 1992
97	Latvia	21 October 1992
98	Estonia	22 October 1992
99	Slovakia	1 January 1993
100	Ukraine	27 April 1993
101	Belarus	5 May 1993
102	Cambodia	29 June 1994
103	Malaysia	29 August 1994
104	South Africa	22 September 1994
105	Singapore	23 September 1994
106	Croatia	22 February 1996
107	Andorra	7 May 1996
108	Mozambique	3 December 1996
109	Guinea-Bissau	10 December 1996
110	Slovenia	18 April 1997
111	Armenia	20 May 1997
112	Turkmenistan	11 June 1997
113	Angola	17 June 1997
114	Liechtenstein	17 October 1997
115	Syria	7 December 1997
116	Bosnia and Herzegovina	26 January 1998
117	Georgia	28 January 1998
118	Belize	14 October 1999
119	Ireland	20 October 1999
120	North Macedonia	22 June 2000
121	Bahrain	26 June 2000
122	Brunei	19 March 2001
123	Monaco	5 April 2001
124	Mauritius	13 May 2003
125	Iceland	11 December 2003
126	Azerbaijan	22 March 2004
127	Nepal	21 June 2006
128	Botswana	4 June 2007
129	San Marino	27 June 2008
130	Saudi Arabia	23 January 2009
131	Antigua and Barbuda	10 August 2009
132	Dominica	24 June 2009
133	Montenegro	24 September 2009
134	Cape Verde	10 August 2010
—	State of Palestine	24 December 2010
135	Maldives	14 March 2011
136	Sri Lanka	9 May 2011
137	Uzbekistan	19 July 2011
138	Timor-Leste	8 September 2011
139	Laos	12 September 2011
140	Tuvalu	19 September 2011
141	Moldova	8 November 2011
142	Gambia	1 December 2011
143	Samoa	20 December 2011
144	Solomon Islands	20 December 2011
145	Kazakhstan	23 January 2012
146	Ethiopia	23 January 2012
147	Burkina Faso	8 February 2012
148	Fiji	12 February 2013
149	Eritrea	13 March 2013
150	Zambia	16 July 2013
151	Mauritania	28 September 2014
152	Zimbabwe	10 February 2015
153	Sierra Leone	12 February 2015
154	Central African Republic	20 February 2015
155	Burundi	27 February 2015
156	Sudan	13 March 2015
157	Mali	17 April 2015
158	South Sudan	8 May 2015
159	Ivory Coast	3 June 2015
160	Tanzania	16 June 2015
161	Comoros	15 October 2015
162	Djibouti	20 November 2015
163	Tajikistan	12 July 2016
164	Kyrgyzstan	13 December 2016
165	Saint Kitts and Nevis	15 March 2017
166	Myanmar	6 April 2017
167	Vanuatu	26 September 2018
168	Marshall Islands	24 September 2019
169	Benin	7 October 2019
170	Rwanda	17 October 2019
171	Palau	24 October 2022
—	Cook Islands	21 May 2024

== Bilateral relations ==
Country	Formal Relations	Notes
Belgium		Belgium is accredited to Ecuador from its embassy in Lima, Peru.; Ecuador has an embassy in Brussels.
Chile	April 26, 1835	See Chile–Ecuador relations.: Chile has an embassy in Quito.; Ecuador has an embassy in Santiago.; In 2024, bilateral trade between Chile and Ecuador totaled $1.436 billion, with Ecuador maintaining a $417 million trade surplus; Ecuadorian exports to Chile reached $926 million, while Chilean exports to Ecuador totaled $510 million.
Czech Republic		Czech Republic is accredited to Ecuador from its embassy in Lima, Peru, and hold consulates in Quito and Guayaquil.; Ecuador has an embassy in Prague.
China	February 1, 1980	See China–Ecuador relations Formal relations started on 1980-01-02 and seven months later China set up its embassy in Ecuador. In July 1981, Ecuador set up its embassy in China. Sino-Ecuadorian relations have been advancing smoothly. The two sides maintain high-level political contacts and exchanges in trade, economic progress, science, technology, culture and education. In international affairs, the two countries understand and support each other. In September 2012, the two nations signed a Commercial and Security Agreement to allow Ecuador to sell easily seafood, cocoa and bananas in China, with the Chinese agreeing to ease tariffs on further food items. In the same period China established an $80 million line of credit for Ecuador with the EximBank to help Ecuador build a road to the re-sited Quito airport.
Colombia		See Colombia–Ecuador relations See also: 2008 Andean diplomatic crisis Ecuador's President Rafael Correa withdrew his government's ambassador in Bogotá, Colombia, and ordered troops to the country's border following a Colombian raid against leftist rebels inside Ecuador March 2, 2008. The Colombian director of national police claimed three captured computers from the deceased FARC rebel leader Raúl Reyes document "tremendously revealing" and "very grave" links between Ecuador and Colombian rebels.March 2, 2008. However, Colombia's actions were condemned across the board by all South American nations, with only the US supporting Colombia. For example, Brazil's foreign minister, Celso Amorim, condemned the Colombian incursion into Ecuador. Furthermore, he suggested that Venezuelan President Hugo Chávez recently gave the leftist Revolutionary Armed Forces of Colombia $300 million. Ecuador's president Rafael Correa said March 3, 2008, that a deal to release political prisoners—including former Colombian Sen. Ingrid Betancourt—was nearly complete before the March 1, 2008, Colombian raid into his country. Venezuelan President Hugo Chávez on March 5, 2008, called the announced movement of Colombian forces in Ecuador a "war crime," and joined Ecuador's president Rafael Correa in demanding international condemnation of the cross-border attack. The presidents of Colombia, Venezuela and Ecuador March 7, 2008, signed a declaration to end a crisis sparked when Colombian troops killed a rebel leader and 21 others inside Ecuadoran territory (2008 Andean diplomatic crisis). In January 2021, Ecuadorian President Lenin Moreno and Colombian President Ivan Duque made a joint statement on the good relations of the two countries.
Finland		Finland is accredited to Ecuador from its embassy in Lima, Peru.; Ecuador has an embassy in Helsinki.
Germany	1922	See Ecuador–Germany relations: Ecuador has an embassy in Berlin and a consulate in Hamburg.; Germany has an embassy in Quito.
Greece		Greece is accredited to Ecuador from its embassy in Lima, Peru.; Ecuador holds a consulate in Athens.
India	1969	See Ecuador–India relations On November 16, 2008, the Foreign Minister of Ecuador Maria Isabel Salvador met her counterpart, Pranab Mukherjee, with a close relationship in oil and defence between these geographically distant countries high on the agenda. On the oil front, the new government in Ecuador has reversed the earlier revenue-sharing arrangements with western oil companies and is now keen on striking new partnerships with state-owned ONGC Videsh of India. In the defence sector, Ecuador became the first country to sign a contract for purchasing the Indian-made Dhruv helicopters, of which one was for use by its president. The embassy expanded its setup with the appointment of a Military Attache and prospects appear bright for more defence exports as Ecuador has agreed to be the servicing hub in South America for Indian defence equipment.
Iran	1973	See Ecuador–Iran relations Ecuador has maintained trade relations with Iran. In December 2008, Iran's Supreme National Security Council Secretary Saeed Jalili visited Ecuador. Alongside president Rafael Correa he called for greater "South–South" co-operation, a term denoting greater exchange of resources, technology, and knowledge between the global South. Iranian president Ahmadinejad also attended the inauguration of President Correa in January 2007.
Japan	August 26, 1918	See Ecuador–Japan relations: Ecuador has an embassy in Tokyo.; Japan has an embassy in Quito.
Malaysia		See Ecuador–Malaysia relations Relations with Malaysia covers on political, commercial, cultural and social activities. Both countries are the members of Non-Aligned Movement. Ecuador trade value with Malaysia are worth about US$15 million.
Mexico	1837 Diplomatic Relations Severed in 5 April 2024	See Ecuador–Mexico relations In April 2024, Mexico severed diplomatic relations with Ecuador due to the raid on the Mexican embassy in Ecuador.
Netherlands		The Netherlands are accredited to Ecuador from its embassy in Lima, Peru.; Ecuador has an embassy in The Hague, a consulate in Rotterdam, and a vice consulate in Amsterdam.
Palestine	2010	Ecuador recognized the State of Palestine in 2010.
Peru		See Ecuador–Peru relations The Paquisha War was a brief military clash that took place between January and February 1981 between Ecuador and Peru over the control of three watchposts. Since the 1990s, Ecuadoran foreign policy has been focused on the country's border dispute with Peru, an issue that has festered since independence. The boundary dispute led to the Cenepa War between Ecuador and Peru in early 1995; after a peace agreement brokered by the four Guarantors of the Rio Protocol (Argentina, Brazil, Chile, and the United States), the Military Observers Mission to Ecuador-Peru (MOMEP) was set up to monitor the zone. In 1998, Presidents Jamil Mahuad of Ecuador and Alberto Fujimori of Peru signed a comprehensive settlement over control of the disputed zone.
Poland		Ecuador is accredited to Poland from its embassy in Vienna, Austria.; Poland is accredited to Ecuador from its embassy in Lima, Peru.
Romania		Romania is accredited to Ecuador from Lima, Peru, and has consulates in Quito and Guayaquil.
Russia		See Ecuador–Russia relations: Ecuador has an embassy in Moscow.; Russia has an embassy in Quito.
Sahrawi Arab Democratic Republic	14 November 1983	Further information: List of ambassadors of the Sahrawi Arab Democratic Republic to Ecuador: Ecuador and SADR maintained diplomatic relations between 1983 and 2024.
South Africa		Ecuador has an embassy in Pretoria.; South Africa is accredited to Ecuador from its embassy in Lima, Peru.
Spain	1840	See Ecuador–Spain relations: Ecuador has an embassy in Madrid and consulates-general in Alicante, Barcelona, Málaga, Murcia, Palma and Valencia.; Spain has an embassy in Quito and a consulate-general in Guayaquil.; In 2024, bilateral trade between Ecuador and Spain totaled $1.65 billion, with Ecuador maintaining a $288 million trade surplus; Ecuadorian exports to Spain reached $969 million, while Spanish exports to Ecuador totaled $681.
Sweden		Ecuador has an embassy in Stockholm.; Sweden has a consulate in Quito.
Thailand		Thailand is accredited to Ecuador from its embassy in Lima, Peru, and holds a consulate general in Quito.; Ecuador has an consulate in Bangkok.; Total bilateral trade between Peru and Thailand reached $672 million, with Thailand maintaining a $436 million trade surplus. Peruvian exports to Thailand totaled $118 million.
Turkey	1950	See Ecuador–Turkey relations: Ecuador has an embassy in Ankara and a consulate in Istanbul.; Turkey has an embassy in Quito and a consulate in Guayaquil.; Trade volume between the two countries was US$117 million in 2019 (Ecuadorian exports/imports: 58/59 million USD.
United Arab Emirates		The United Arab Emirates is accredited to Ecuador from its embassy in Lima, Peru.; Ecuador has an embassy in Abu Dhabi.; On December 6, 2025, Ecuadorian President Daniel Noboa met with UAE President Sheikh Mohamed bin Zayed Al Nahyan in Abu Dhabi during an official visit that included the inauguration of Ecuador's embassy in the UAE, the signing of an Investment Protection and Promotion Agreement, and commitments to finalize a bilateral Comprehensive Economic Partnership Agreement (CEPA) in early 2026 alongside expanded cooperation in trade, artificial intelligence, renewable energy, and conservation.
United Kingdom	1853	See Ecuador–United Kingdom relations Acting Ecuadorian Foreign Minister Kintto Lucas with British Foreign Office Minister Jeremy Browne in Quito, July 2011. Ecuador established diplomatic relations with the United Kingdom on 29 January 1853.: Ecuador maintains an embassy in London.; The United Kingdom is accredited to Ecuador through its embassy in Quito.; Both countries share common membership of the International Criminal Court, the United Nations, and the World Trade Organization, as well as the Andean Countries–UK Trade Agreement. Bilaterally the two countries have a Double Taxation Agreement. Relations between the United Kingdom and Ecuador were traditionally regarded as "low-key but cordial", especially before the election of Rafael Correa; the Prince of Wales and Duchess of Cornwall visited the country in 2009, as part of a tour celebrating the bicentenary of Charles Darwin. President Correa visited London in the same year, speaking mostly in English at the London School of Economics about the changes his government was making. In 2012, relations became strained when Julian Assange, founder of the WikiLeaks website, entered the Ecuadorian embassy in London and sought asylum. Assange had lost legal appeals against his extradition to Sweden where he was wanted for questioning about alleged sexual assault and rape, but while within the embassy he was on diplomatic territory and beyond the reach of the British police. The United Kingdom Foreign and Commonwealth Office delivered a note to the Ecuadorian government in Quito reminding them of the provisions of the Diplomatic and Consular Premises Act 1987 which allow the British government to withdraw recognition of diplomatic protection from embassies; the move was interpreted as a hostile act by Ecuador, with Foreign Minister Ricardo Patiño stating that this "explicit threat" would be met with "appropriate responses in accordance with international law". Assange was granted diplomatic asylum on August 16, 2012, with Foreign Minister Patiño stating that Assange's fears of political persecution were "legitimate". Finally, President Lenín Moreno revoked Assange's asylum in April 2019. In reaction, the British Foreign Secretary, Jeremy Hunt, thanked Moreno for his cooperation to "ensure Assange faces justice".
United States		See Ecuador–United States relations The United States and Ecuador used to maintain close ties based on mutual interests in maintaining democratic institutions; combating cannabis and cocaine; building trade, investment, and financial ties; cooperating in fostering Ecuador's economic development; and participating in inter-American organizations. Ties were further strengthened by the presence of an estimated 150,000–200,000 Ecuadorians living in the United States and by 24,000 U.S. citizens visiting Ecuador annually, and by approximately 15,000 U.S. citizens residing in Ecuador. The United States assisted Ecuador's economic development directly through the Agency for International Development (USAID) program in Ecuador and through multilateral organizations such as the Inter-American Development Bank and the World Bank. In addition, the U.S. Peace Corps operates a sizable program in Ecuador. More than 100 U.S. companies are doing business in Ecuador. The relations deteriorated greatly during the presidency of Rafael Correa since 2007 until 2017. The relations, however, improved significantly during the presidency of Lenin Moreno since 2017. In February 2020, his visit to Washington was the first meeting between an Ecuadorian and U.S. president in 17 years.: Ecuador has an embassy in Washington, D.C., and several consulates throughout the country.; United States has an embassy in Quito and a consulate in Guayaquil.
Uruguay		See Ecuador–Uruguay relations: Ecuador has an embassy in Montevideo.; Uruguay has an embassy in Quito.; In 2024, bilateral trade between Uruguay and Chile totaled $381 million, with Uruguay maintaining a $52.8 million trade surplus; Uruguayan exports to Chile reached $217 million (led by wheat at $27.2 million, bovine meat, and rice), while Chilean exports to Uruguay totaled $164 million (led by fish fillets at $10.8 million, processed tomatoes, and petroleum gas).
Venezuela		See Ecuador–Venezuela relations Diplomatic ties trace back to the Spanish colonization of the Americas. With the independence both countries united under the Gran Colombia along with New Granada (then Colombia and Panama). After the dissolution of the Gran Colombia, Ecuador named Don Pedro Gual as plenipotentiary minister with the main task of resolving the debt acquired while part of the Gran Colombia union as well as to establish diplomatic relations with the New Granada and Venezuela. On August 4, 1852, Venezuela sent a diplomatic delegation in Quito and named José Julián Ponce as finance administrator. The relations remained cordial and entered into a second period between 1910 and 1963 with two diplomatic incidents occurring in 1928 and 1955. Ecuador and Venezuela strengthened ties in politics, diplomacy and military. During the presidency of Lenin Moreno since 2017, Ecuador broke diplomatic relations with Venezuela. Ecuador did not any more recognize the regime of Nicolás Maduro. Instead, Ecuador recognized and supported opposition leader Juan Guaidó as Interim President of Venezuela. Bilateral trade between Venezuela and Peru reached $155.2 million, with Peru maintaining a $127 million trade surplus. Peruvian exports to Venezuela totaled $141 million.

== See also ==
- List of diplomatic missions in Ecuador
- List of diplomatic missions of Ecuador
