= Guillaume Long =

Ecuadorian politician

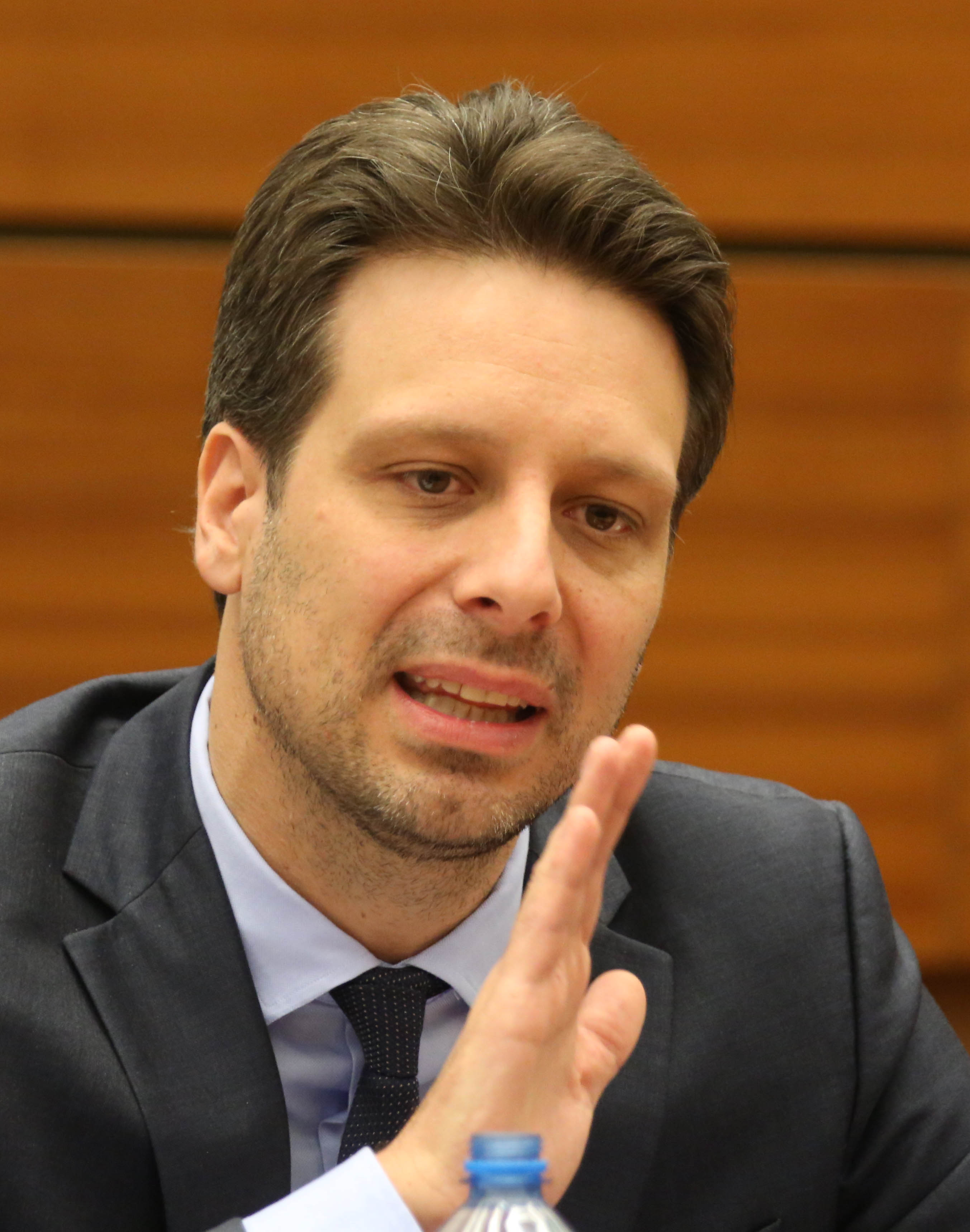

Minister of Foreign Affairs
- In office 3 March 2016 – 24 May 2017
- President: Rafael Correa
- Preceded by: Ricardo Patiño
- Succeeded by: María Fernanda Espinosa

Minister of Culture and Heritage
- In office 25 March 2015 – March 2016
- President: Rafael Correa
- Preceded by: Francisco Borja Cevallos
- Succeeded by: Ana Rodríguez Ludeña

Coordinating Minister of Knowledge and Human Talent
- In office 6 May 2013 – 2015
- President: Rafael Correa
- Preceded by: Augusto Espinoza
- Succeeded by: Andrés Araúz

Personal details
- Born: 22 February 1977 (age 49) Créteil, France
- Education: University of London

Guillaume Long (born 22 February 1977) is a French-born Ecuadorian academic and former politician who served as the Minister of Foreign Affairs of Ecuador and Human Mobility, in the government of Rafael Correa. He was previously the Minister of Culture and Heritage, and Minister of Knowledge and Human Talent. Long was also Ecuador's Permanent Representative to the United Nations in Geneva, before resigning in January 2018 over strong disagreements with President Lenín Moreno. Since 2019, Long has been working for the Washington, D.C.–based Center for Economic and Policy Research. Since 2025, he is the Senior Diplomatic Advisor to The Hague Group, a coalition of states committed to upholding international law in Palestine.

== Early life and education ==
Long was born in Créteil, a suburb of Paris, France, in 1977 to a French mother and a British father, and grew up in the suburb of Sucy-en-Brie. After some extended time in Latin America, Long completed his studies at the University of London, where he earned a PhD at the Institute for the Study of the Americas, a Masters in Political Science and a Bachelor in History at the School of Oriental and African Studies.

== Political career ==
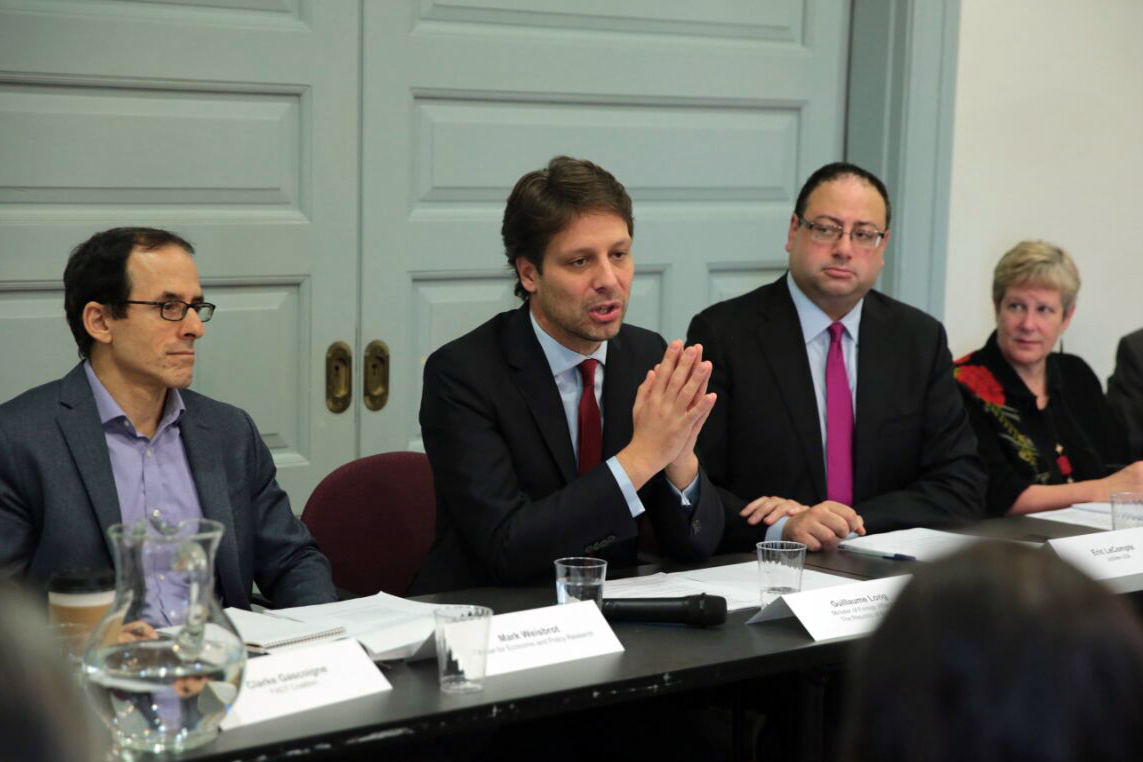
Guillaume Long with Mark Weisbrot (left) and Eric LeCompte (right)

In 2009, Long left his history and international relations teaching job to become advisor to the National Secretary of Planning and Development René Ramírez Gallegos.

In September 2011, President Correa appointed Long as a member of the "Consejo de Evaluación, Acreditación y Aseguramiento de la Calidad de la Educación Superior", Ecuador's university's accreditation and quality assurance agency and was elected its president by the council members. The council's task, as mandated by the new Constitution and the Law of Higher Education, was to guarantee basic quality standards in Ecuadorian universities and to close down those establishments, often referred to as garage universities, considered too precarious to offer higher education degrees. Some establishments were denounced for engaging in academic fraud, even in the outright sale of degrees. In April 2012, Long announced the closure of 14 sub-standard universities.

On 6 May 2013, Correa appointed Long the Coordinating Minister for Knowledge and Human Talent. From this post, Long was one of the key promoters of the creation of four high standard universities in Ecuador: Ikiam located in the Amazon and essentially focused on life sciences; Yachay University, a university located at the heart of a science, technology and innovation cluster; Unae, a large-scale teacher's training university for primary and secondary teachers; and Uniartes, a university for the arts located in the historic center of Guayaquil.

On 25 March 2015, Correa appointed Long Minister of Culture and Heritage, a post he held until March 2016. Long dedicated much of his efforts as Minister of Culture to passing a new and long overdue Law of Culture mandated by the 2008 Constitution.

Between May 2014 and March 2016, Long was chairman of the International Relations Committee of PAIS Alliance, a socialist political movement led by Correa. He was the chief organiser of two internationalist conferences (ELAP I and ELAP II) that brought progressive political parties and movements from across Latin America and the world to Quito.

== As Foreign Minister ==
On 3 March 2016, Long became Ecuador's new Minister of Foreign Affairs and Human Mobility. His time at the helm of Ecuador's foreign policy was marked by the 16 April 2016 earthquake and the channeling of the international aid and relief efforts.

It was also marked by the crisis of UNASUR and CELAC and the regional divisions and tensions over Venezuela, with Long recurrently insisting on the need for dialogue and clashing over this issue with OAS Secretary General Luis Almagro at the 45th session of the OAS General Assembly in June 2016.

Long played an important role in the establishment of peace talks between the Colombian Government and the ELN guerrillas in Quito, Ecuador, and in the humanitarian steps that were taken in 2016 and 2017 to pave the way for the start of the formal negotiations on 7 February 2017, including the release of ELN prisoners from Colombian jails and of several people held in captivity by the ELN.

Long played a leading role in seeking regional consensus in Latin America to demand that the United States put an end to the Wet feet, dry feet policy that favored and incentivized Cuban migration, affecting both the security and human rights of the migrants and the stability of transit countries.

During Long's term, Ecuador was elected Chair of the Group of 77 for the first time in its history. Long made the most of the scandal of the Panama Papers and Correa's calling for a referendum over barring civil servants from holding assets in tax havens, and made the struggle against tax evasion a cornerstone of Ecuador's foreign policy and a core theme during his term as foreign minister. Long recurrently pressed this matter whether at the helm of the G77 or in other multilateral fora.

In November 2016, during Long's term as Foreign Minister, President Xi Jinping visited Ecuador in the first State-visit of a President of the People's Republic of China to the South American country. This was a high-profile visit and it further consolidated the close relations between China and Ecuador fostered during Correa's presidency.

During Long's time at the Ministry of Foreign Affairs, the case of Julian Assange gained renewed global prominence. In December 2016, Assange was finally questioned in the Ecuadorian Embassy in London by Ecuadorian and Swedish prosecutors. In May 2017, the Swedish prosecutor Marianne Ny announced that she was dropping the case against Assange. This was hailed as a great victory for Assange and bolstered Ecuador's international position and its justification of its granting of the political asylum. Long had been active in international circles pressing for a denouement to the Assange issue, including a letter to his Swedish counterpart in which he argued that the delays of the Swedish prosecution and absence of charges amounted to a miscarriage of justice. In November 2016, Long also oversaw the cutting off of Assange's internet connection during the US presidential elections. Ecuador's Ministry of Foreign Affairs argued that it refused to meddle in other countries' internal affairs particularly in times of elections, but that this measure bore no relations with the asylum.

Long was also in charge of Ecuador's oil negotiations within OPEC and represented Ecuador at the OPEC meetings in Algiers on 29 September 2016 and Vienna on 30 November 2016, and the 10 December 2016 OPEC-non OPEC meeting in Vienna that resulted in the commitment to cut oil production by just under 1.8 million barrels a day.

In 2017, Long played an important role in denouncing 16 bilateral investment treaties (BITs), after the Ecuadorian Constitution banned extra regional commercial arbitration and a civil society audit commission (the CAITISA) found these BITs to have played a detrimental role for Ecuador's economic development. Long had been an ardent critic of investment-state-dispute-settlement (ISDS) mechanisms.

After the election of Donald Trump in the United States, and the threat of an increase in the deportations of Ecuadorians, Long also implemented a "contingency plan" in support of Ecuadorian migrants.

== Ambassador to the UN ==
The new President of Ecuador, Lenin Moreno, named Long the Permanent Representative of Ecuador to the United Nations in Geneva. Long's stint at the head of the diplomatic mission was mostly marked by his leadership of the Open-ended intergovernmental working group on transnational corporations and other business enterprises with respect to human rights.

In January 2018, Long resigned from his position in a public letter to Moreno, in which he denounced what he referred to as the new government's unconstitutional measures and the betrayal of the platform and program of the Citizen's Revolution on which the new government has been elected.

== After Government ==
After resigning from government, Long became also a Senior Fellow at the Washington DC-based think tank Center for Economic and Policy Research (CEPR), co-directed by Mark Weisbrot. At CEPR, Long has focused mostly on Latin American politics, elections monitoring, regionalism (including the attempted relaunch of UNASUR in 2022 and 2023), US-Latin American relations, and Global South non-alignment and collective action.

Since 2025, Long is a Senior Diplomatic Advisor to The Hague Group. As such he has been instrumental in the organisation of various ministerial and high-level meetings on international law.

Long also teaches history and International Relations at Sciences-Po Paris.

== Criticism ==
Long was heavily criticized, notably by former Ecuadorian foreign ministers, for being the first non-Ecuadorian-born Foreign Minister.

During the unrest in Venezuela throughout 2016 and in the first half of 2017, there was recurrent criticism that Long was not being hard enough on the Maduro Government and should take a more forceful stance in line with most other Latin American countries in the region outside of ALBA. This issue played an important role in Ecuadorian domestic politics. In one of his weekly editorials, former Foreign Minister Francisco Carrión claimed that Long had said that "one breathes happiness" in Venezuela. Long denounced this as a lie and pushed Carrión to prove these had been his words. Carrión was eventually forced to apologize on Twitter. During the elections of 2017, Long said that there was an attempt to influence the population "with the argument that Ecuador is going to become like Venezuela. (…) Well no, Ecuador is not Venezuela". This declaration was the Ecuadorian Government's clearest attempt thus far to distance itself from the Venezuelan crisis.

Business sectors but also certain factions within Correa's government complained that Long, along with other senior officials in the Correa administration, opposed the free trade agreement between Ecuador, Colombia and Peru, and the European Union, which Ecuador finally adhered to in December 2016. He and others were considered to be the "enemy within".

== See also ==
- List of foreign ministers in 2017
- List of current foreign ministers
