= Jubilee USA =

Jubilee USA may refer to:

- Jubilee USA Network, an alliance of national churches, diverse religious groups, and labor, environmental, and political organizations working on global financial reforms to protect vulnerable communities.
- Jubilee USA, originally named Ozark Jubilee, an ABC-TV country music program from 1958 to 1960.
