= Uruguayans in Ecuador =

Uruguayan Ecuadorians are people born in Uruguay who live in Ecuador, or Ecuadorian-born people of Uruguayan descent.

Many Uruguayan-born persons live in Ecuador, for a number of reasons. Both countries share the Spanish language; the historical origins of both nations is common (part of the Spanish Empire until the early 19th century).

Uruguayan-style pizza and asado can be found on selected places in Ecuador.

== Notable people ==
- Daniel Fascioli, footballer
- Marcelo Fleitas, footballer
- Marcelo Velazco, footballer
- Oscar Zubía, football player and manager

== See also ==
- Ecuador–Uruguay relations
- Emigration from Uruguay
- Ethnic groups in Ecuador
