= Ecuador–Turkey relations =

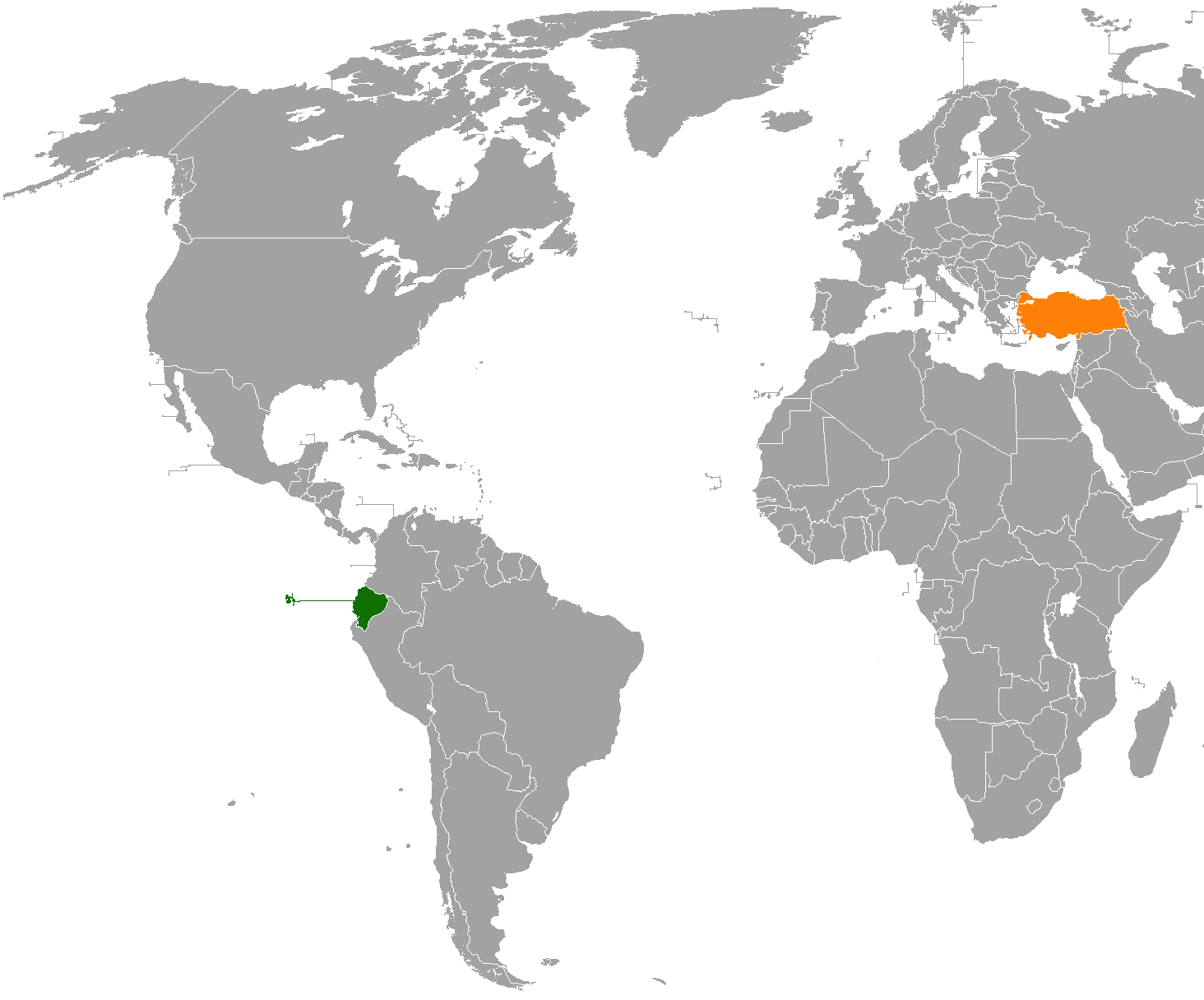
- Ecuador: Turkey

Ecuador–Turkey relations are foreign relations between Ecuador and Turkey. Ecuador has an embassy in Ankara since 2009. Turkey has an embassy in Quito since 2012.

== Presidential visits ==
Guest	Host	Place of visit	Date of visit
(Turkey) President Recep Tayyip Erdoğan	(Ecuador) President Rafael Correa	Carondelet Palace, Quito	3 February 2016

== Economic links ==
Trade volume between the two countries was US$117 million in 2019. (Turkish exports/imports: US$59/58 million)

== See also ==
- Foreign relations of Ecuador
- Foreign relations of Turkey
