= María Fernanda Espinosa =

Ecuadorian politician (born 1964)

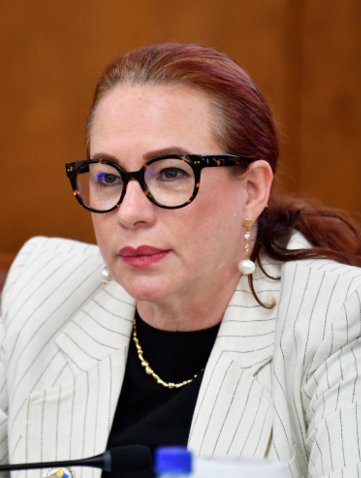
- Espinosa in 2024

President of the 73rd UN General Assembly
- In office 18 September 2018 – 17 September 2019
- Preceded by: Miroslav Lajčák
- Succeeded by: Tijjani Muhammad-Bande

Minister of Foreign Affairs
- In office 24 May 2017 – 11 June 2018
- President: Lenín Moreno
- Preceded by: Guillaume Long
- Succeeded by: José Valencia Amores
- In office 15 January 2007 – 7 December 2007
- President: Rafael Correa
- Preceded by: Francisco Carrión
- Succeeded by: María Isabel Salvador

Minister of National Defense
- In office 28 November 2012 – 23 September 2014
- President: Rafael Correa
- Preceded by: Miguel Carvajal
- Succeeded by: Fernando Cordero Cueva

Coordinating Minister of Heritage
- In office 19 October 2009 – 28 November 2012
- President: Rafael Correa
- Preceded by: Alex Rivas
- Succeeded by: María Belén Moncayo

Personal details
- Born: 7 September 1964 (age 62) Salamanca, Spain
- Spouse: Eduardo Mangas
- Education: Facultad Latinoamericana de Ciencias Sociales; Pontificia Universidad Católica del Ecuador; Rutgers University

María Fernanda Espinosa Garcés (born 7 September 1964) is an Ecuadorian linguist, poet, politician, and diplomat. Currently, is Executive Director of GWL Voices, an NGO dedicated to achieve a gender-equal multilateral system. She served as an advisor on biodiversity and indigenous peoples (1999–2005) and was the regional director for South America (2005–2007) at the International Union for Conservation of Nature (IUCN). Espinosa Garcés was Ecuador's Minister of Foreign Affairs twice, from 2007 to 2008 and then from 2017 to 2018. She also served as ambassador and permanent representative to the United Nations in New York (2008–2009) and Geneva (2014–2017), and as Ecuador's Minister of National Defense (2012–2014). In June 2018, she was elected President of the United Nations General Assembly for the 73rd session by a two-thirds vote of the member states. Espinosa Garcés became the fourth woman in the seventy-three-year history of the United Nations to be elected President of the General Assembly. Besides her political career, she is also a poet and essayist.

== Education ==
María Fernanda Espinosa's academic journey began at the French-Ecuadorian Lycée La Condamine in Quito, where she earned her Baccalaureate from 1978 to 1982. She then pursued a Bachelor of Arts in Applied Linguistics at the Pontifical Catholic University of Ecuador (PUCE), graduating in 1988.

In 1991, she completed post-graduate studies in Anthropology and Political Science at the Latin American Faculty of Social Sciences (FLACSO) in Quito. Two years later, in 1993, Espinosa earned a Master’s Degree in Social Sciences and Amazonian Studies from FLACSO. Her thesis focused on Conservation policies and managing natural protected areas in the northern Amazonian region of Ecuador.

From 1994 to 1996, María Fernanda pursued doctoral studies in Geography at Rutgers University in New Jersey, although she did not complete the degree. During this period, she also became a Fellow at the Center for the Critical Analysis of Contemporary Culture at Rutgers University from 1996 to 1997.

Espinosa’s academic and research career then led her to become an Associate Professor and Researcher at FLACSO, where she established and coordinated the Program on Socio-Environmental Studies. Her work during this time concentrated on the Amazon, sustainable development, and climate change.

From 1999 to 2005, Espinosa served as an advisor on biodiversity, climate change, and indigenous peoples’ policies. She was later appointed as the Regional Director for South America at the International Union for the Conservation of Nature (IUCN), a position she held from 2005 to 2007 before transitioning into her political and diplomatic career.

Espinosa is also a prolific writer, having published several works of poetry and essays. In 1990, she received the National Poetry Prize of Ecuador for her literary contributions.

== Political career ==
María Fernanda Espinosa began her career working with indigenous communities in the Ecuadorian Amazon, focusing on the stewardship of tropical rainforests. Her early work involved collaboration with civil society organizations and academic institutions, eventually leading her to serve as an advisor on biodiversity and climate change policy. From 1989 to 1990, she worked as a project officer for the Natura Foundation of Ecuador, where she connected biodiversity conservation with local livelihoods. In 1994, Espinosa worked as a UNICEF consultant in Niger on a pilot project to improve environmental education and develop primary environmental care initiatives with rural women. She also served as a consultant for the United Nations Intergovernmental Panel on Forests in New York in 1995, focusing on indigenous knowledge and civil society engagement regarding forests and intellectual property rights.

Espinosa founded and directed the Socio-Environmental Studies Program at the Latin American Faculty of Social Sciences (FLACSO) in Quito from 1996 to 1999, further solidifying her role as a leader in environmental issues. Between 1999 and 2005, she served as an advisor on biodiversity and indigenous peoples for the International Union for Conservation of Nature (IUCN), participating in international environmental negotiations related to biodiversity, genetic resources, traditional knowledge, and intellectual property rights.

In 2005, Espinosa was appointed Regional Director for South America at IUCN, based in Quito. In this role, she led the establishment and implementation of the Regional South American Program, significantly enhancing the organization’s technical and financial capabilities to advise and support governments in sustainable development planning, programming, and policymaking. Her work emphasized the connection between poverty eradication and biodiversity conservation, strengthening the Regional Office's capacity to support governments in negotiations related to biodiversity, climate change, forest management, and protected areas.

During her time at IUCN, María Fernanda developed a regional program aligned with the priorities of South American governments to address environmental challenges related to the Millennium Development Goals, focusing on sustainable development, poverty eradication, and social equality. She positioned IUCN as a crucial regional stakeholder, recognized as an authoritative expert, technical assistance provider, and advocacy leader on environmental issues. Espinosa coordinated common environmental strategies among the states of the region, mobilized resources, facilitated donor cooperation, and provided technical, scientific, and political advice to governments on environmental and sustainable development issues. She also established advocacy strategies for biodiversity conservation among political leaders and actively participated in the Conferences of the Parties to the Convention on Biological Diversity and the Convention on Climate Change.

Throughout her early career, Espinosa consistently focused on connecting biodiversity conservation with sustainable development and the empowerment of indigenous communities. She contributed to initiatives by various organizations, including UNICEF, the Amazon Cooperation Treaty Organization, the Central Bank of Ecuador, and the Fundación Futuro Latinoamericano. Her work laid a strong foundation for her later roles in government and international diplomacy.

=== Government of Rafael Correa ===
Under President Rafael Correa, María Fernanda Espinosa held multiple key roles in the Ecuadorian government, reflecting her versatility and expertise across various domains. From January to December 2007, she served as Minister for Foreign Affairs, Commerce, and Integration, where she established the New Ecuadorian Foreign Policy for 2007-2010. During her tenure, she reorganized the Ministry to include foreign trade responsibilities and promoted regional political and trade integration initiatives. Notably, she initiated bi-national coordination cabinets between Ecuador and Peru to address issues related to border development, security, defense, and economic cooperation, which furthered the implementation of the Peace Agreement signed with Peru in 1998.

Following her role as Foreign Minister, Espinosa was appointed Special Advisor to the President of the Constituent Assembly, Alberto Acosta, from December 2007 to February 2008. In this position, she played a crucial role in the constitutional process that led to Ecuador's 2008 Constitution, particularly in drafting sections on the rights of nature, indigenous peoples, and the plurinational state, as well as areas concerning security, defense, and international affairs.

In March 2008, María Fernanda became Ecuador’s first female Permanent Representative to the United Nations in New York, a position she held until September 2009. During her time as ambassador, she was appointed by the President of the General Assembly as Co-facilitator of the Special Working Group on the Revitalization of the Work of the General Assembly. Espinosa also led Ecuador’s participation in international negotiations addressing the 2008 financial crisis, culminating in the 2009 Conference on the World Financial and Economic Crisis and Its Impact on Development. Her contributions extended to environmental and climate change negotiations, and she actively engaged in discussions on South-South cooperation and system-wide coherence, including the establishment of UN Women.

From October 2009 till November 2012 she was Minister of Natural and Cultural Heritage, where she led the Yasuní-ITT Initiative. As the head of this sectoral cabinet, she oversaw the Ministry of Environment, Ministry of Culture, Ministry of Sports, Ministry of Tourism, and the Governing Council of the Galapagos Islands. In this capacity, she implemented policies to recover and safeguard Ecuador’s cultural and natural heritage, spearheaded the National Plan Against Racism and Discrimination, and represented Ecuador in international negotiation processes on climate change and sustainable development. Her leadership in the Yasuní ITT Initiative, which sought to avoid carbon dioxide emissions by leaving oil reserves untapped in exchange for international compensation, marked a significant contribution to global environmental discourse.

In November 2012, Espinosa was appointed Minister of National Defense, becoming the third woman to hold this position in Ecuador. She oversaw the Armed Forces during a sensitive period marked by internal conflict in neighboring Colombia. Espinosa led reforms in social security management, education, training, and health policies for military forces, and she was instrumental in creating the National Defense Political Agenda 2014-2017. Her tenure also saw the establishment of a Gender Equality Policy within the Armed Forces and the convening of the first international cooperation network of Women Ministers and Leaders of Defense. Espinosa’s efforts modernized the Armed Forces, adapting them to the new constitutional framework and addressing contemporary security threats such as cybersecurity, organized crime, and natural disasters.

In October 2014, María Fernanda Espinosa was appointed Permanent Representative of Ecuador to the United Nations and other international organizations in Geneva, Switzerland, a position she held until May 2017. During this period, she was elected chair of the Human Rights Council’s working group on negotiating a legally binding instrument on transnational corporations and human rights. Her work was a milestone in the Council's deliberations, as it was the first time the implications of transnational corporations on human rights were discussed for consideration in a legally binding instrument. In her capacity as Permanent Representative, she defended the Ecuadorian Government's decision to grant political asylum to Julian Assange in a discussion on arbitrary detention in September 2016 as a matter of international law and human rights.

Espinosa played a significant role in international bodies such as the ILO, WHO, UNCTAD, and others, contributing to the institutional reform of the International Organization for Migration (IOM) and the articulation of the Human Rights Council's work with the Sustainable Development Goals and the 2030 Agenda. She coordinated Ecuador's participation in key international mechanisms and conventions, including those related to disarmament, migration, and environmental protection. She served as lead negotiator for the United Nations Conference on Sustainable Development (Rio+20), and the United Nations Climate Change Conferences of the Parties in Copenhagen (COP 15), Cancun (COP 16), Paris (COP 21), and Bonn (COP 23), where she led the common position of the 34 members of the Community of Latin American and Caribbean States (CELAC).

Government of Lenin Moreno

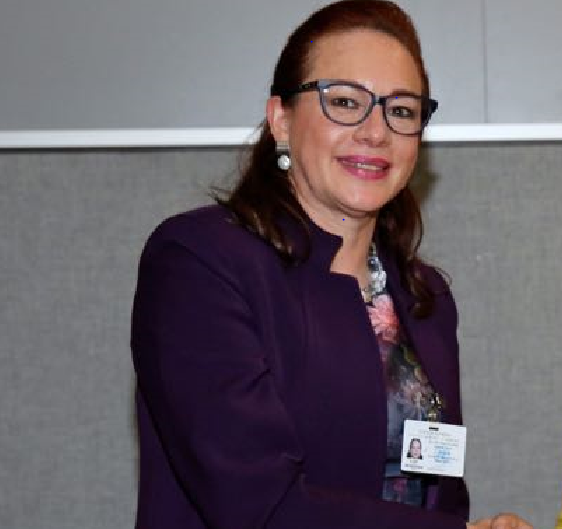
Fernanda Espinosa meeting a dignitary in 2017

On 24 May 2017 Espinosa was appointed as Minister of Foreign Affairs in the government of President Lenín Moreno.

=== United Nations Assembly President ===
On June 5, 2018, Espinosa was elected as the fourth woman president of the United Nations General Assembly and the first woman from Latin America and the Caribbean to preside over this body, since its foundation in 1945.

A total of 128 member states, out of the 193 that make up the United Nations, voted for the candidature of Espinosa who ran for the position against the permanent representative of Honduras to the United Nations, Mary Elizabeth Flores.

During her tenure as the 73rd President of the United Nations General Assembly, Espinosa convened a group of women leaders to promote awareness and international commitment to boosting political participation of women. She held several high-level events on women’s empowerment and political participation and gathered woman Heads of State and Government and other leading female figures to advance the gender equality agenda. During her presidency she chaired the adoption of the United Nations Declaration on the Rights of Peasants in November 2018, the Global Compact on Refugees and the Global Compact for Safe, Orderly and Regular Migration in December 2018.

Espinosa launched the International Year of Indigenous Languages in February 2019 and spearheaded the high-level event on culture and sustainable development in May 2019.

As president of the United Nations General Assembly, she promoted a worldwide campaign against the use of single-use plastics and achieved the complete elimination of single-use plastics in the United Nations headquarters in New York and Geneva.

=== Post–UNGA presidency ===
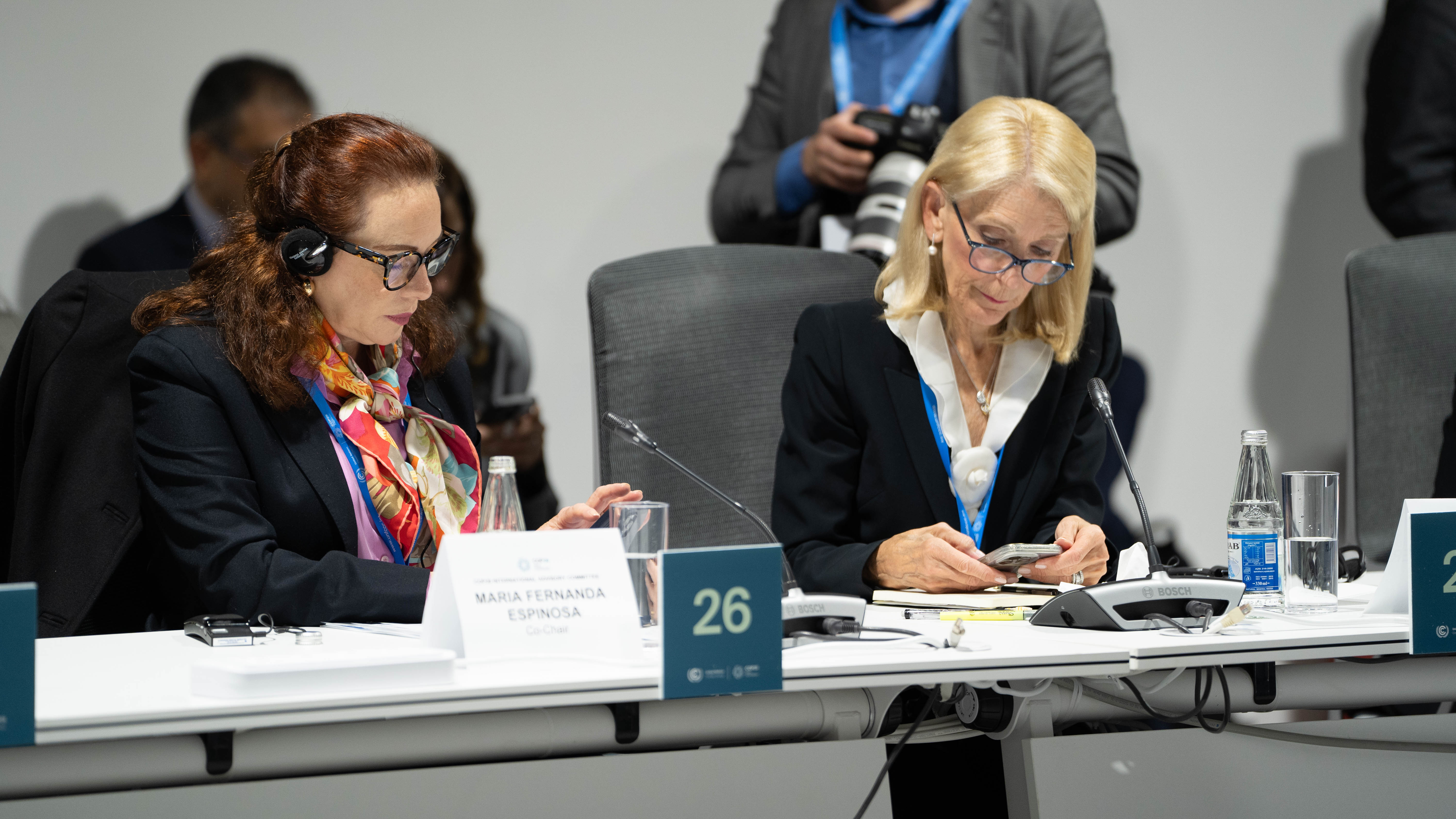
Fernanda Espinosa (left) during a Baku Climate Meeting in 2024

In 2020, Espinosa was nominated by the heads of government of Antigua and Barbuda and Sant Vincent and the Grenadines for the position of secretary-general of the Organization of American States. She ran against incumbent Luis Almagro, nominated by Colombia. Almagro won his reappointment with 23 votes against 10 in the election held on 20 March that year. Her home country of Ecuador did not support her candidacy.

Before starting her political and diplomatic career, Espinosa was Associate Professor and Researcher at the Latin American Faculty of Social Sciences FLACSO, where she established and coordinated the Program on Socio-Environmental Studies. She served as advisor in biodiversity, climate change, and indigenous peoples’ policies (1999-2005), and later as regional director for South America of the International Union for the Conservation of Nature UICN (2005-2007).

In May 2026 Espinosa was nominated by Antigua and Barbuda as a candidate in the selection process for the next Secretary-General of the United Nations.

== Other activities ==
- International Crisis Group (ICG), Board of Trustees (since 2023)
- International Gender Champions (IGC). Member
- World Future Council, Member
- World Academy of Art and Science, Fellow
- Fellow at the Bosch Academy.
- Commissioner to the Lancet COVID-19 Commission.
- Member of the High-Level Advisory Council for the United Nations Alliance of Civilizations, UNAOC.
- Member of the Multi-Stakeholder Steering Committee of the Generation Equality Forum and the Beijing + 25.
- Member of the Political Advisory Panel of the Universal Health Coverage 2030 Movement, UHC2030.
- Executive Director and Member of GWL Voices.
- Member of the Strategic Committee of the SDSN Science Panel for the Amazon, SPA.
- Member of the UNDP Human Development Report Advisory Panel on Human Security.
- Founding Member of the Centre for UN Studies at the University of Buckingham.

Espinosa acts as a Goodwill Ambassador for the Latin American and Caribbean Fund for the Development of the Indigenous Peoples, FILAC, and for the Common Home of Humanity.

== Awards and honors ==
- Awarded with the 2020 Sundance Film Festival Women’s Leadership Celebration. The 7th annual event, hosted by Zions Bank, January 2020.

- The 2019 Rehabilitation International Award for Outstanding Achievements in innovation “for her Innovative work in advancing the rights of persons with disabilities globally”.

- Declared 100 Women BBC as one of the 100 inspiring and influential women from around the world for 2019.

- The Atahualpa Medal for Merit, Gran Cruz (Grand Cross) class, September 24, 2014, delivered by the Armed Forces of Ecuador.

- The Orden “El Sol del Perú” (The Order of the Sun of Peru), Gran Cruz (Grand Cross) class, February 23, 2007.

Diplomatic posts
Preceded by Luis Gallegos	Ecuador Ambassador to United Nations in Geneva; 2014–2017	Succeeded by Guillaume Long
Preceded by Miroslav Lajčák	President of the United Nations General Assembly; 2018–2019	Succeeded by Tijjani Muhammad-Bande
Political offices
Preceded by Francisco Carrión	Minister of Foreign Affairs; 2007–2007	Succeeded by María Isabel Salvador
Preceded by Alex Rivas	Coordinating Minister of Heritage; 2009–2012	Succeeded by María Belén Moncayo
Preceded by Sandra Vela Dávila	Minister of Sports; 2011–2011	Succeeded by José Francisco Cevallos
Preceded by Miguel Carvajal	Minister of National Defense; 2012–2014	Succeeded by Fernando Cordero Cueva
Preceded by Guillaume Long	Minister of Foreign Affairs; 2017–2018	Succeeded by José Valencia
Party political offices
Preceded by Ricardo Patiño	Second Vice President of the PAIS Alliance; 2017–2018	Succeeded by Ricardo Zambrano
