= Ecuador–Uruguay relations =

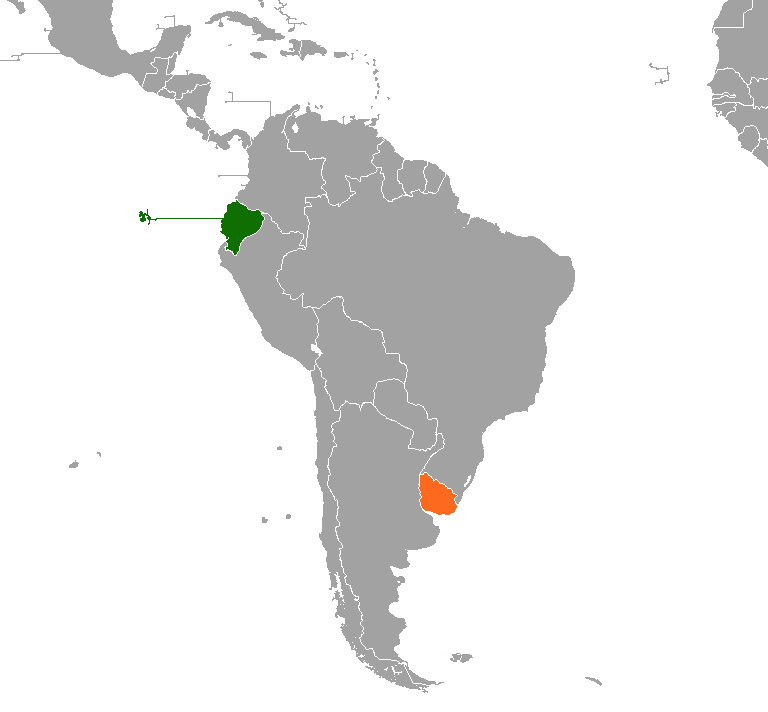
- Ecuador: Uruguay

Ecuador–Uruguay relations are foreign relations between Ecuador and Uruguay. Ecuador has an embassy in Montevideo. Uruguay has an embassy in Quito and a consulate in Guayaquil.

Historically, both countries were part of the Spanish Empire until the early 19th century. Currently, both countries are full members of the Rio Group, of the Latin Union, of ALADI, of the Association of Spanish Language Academies, of the Organization of American States, of the Organization of Ibero-American States, of the Community of Latin American and Caribbean States, and of the Group of 77.

As of 2013, Ecuador had become a significant trading partner for Uruguay.

== See also ==
- Foreign relations of Ecuador
- Foreign relations of Uruguay
- Uruguayans in Ecuador
