= Deportivo Cuenca =

Ecuadorean football club

- Full name: Club Deportivo Cuenca
- Nicknames: El Cuenquita; Los Morlacos; El Expreso Austral
- Founded: March 4, 1971; 55 years ago
- Ground: Estadio Alejandro Serrano Aguilar
- Capacity: 20,000
- Chairman: Eduardo Álvarez
- Manager: Daniel Neculman
- League: Ecuadorian Serie A
- 2025: First stage: 7th of 16; Second hexagonal: 2nd of 6
- Website: https://clubdeportivocuenca.com/
Home colours	Away colours	Third colours

Club Deportivo Cuenca is an Ecuadorian football club based in Cuenca. They currently play in the Serie A, the top-flight football league in the country, and is one of two clubs from Cuenca to have played in the top-flight (the other being LDU Cuenca).

They are one of three clubs outside the main cities Quito and Guayaquil to have a national championship, which they won in 2004. They have also participated in several Copa Libertadores editions.

Deportivo Cuenca was founded on March 4, 1971, and is the second-oldest club in the city after Tecni Club. Their home stadium is Estadio Alejandro Serrano Aguilar, which was named after former club president and mayor of Cuenca. Because of the limited number of clubs from the Province of Azuay that have played in the Serie A, Deportivo Cuenca has no major local rivals.

== History ==
=== Foundation ===
In 1970 the desire was born to form a professional soccer team in the city of Cuenca. This desire was shaped through Alejandro Serrano Aguilar (mayor of the city then), Polivio Vázquez and Alfredo Pena. The citizen's endorsement was immediate before the initiative headed by the mayor, therefore the Commission of Sports was satisfied to Gilbert Sotomayor, Ricardo Ordóñez and Bolívar Lupercio, whose first management was to obtain the acceptance of the Ecuadorian Federation of Soccer so that the professional team of the city could participate in the professional level. By means of the session celebrated in February 1971 in the "Salón de la Ciudad" of the Very Illustrious Municipality of Cuenca, the project became a reality, and it was then that Deportivo Cuenca was born. A month later, the Association of Soccer funded the Asociación de Fútbol no Amateur del Azuay (AFA) (Association of Soccer non-Amateur of Azuay). As a club the first decisions were taken: the uniform would be red and yellow with a T-shirt to vertical rays, the first Technical Director was Carlos Alberto Raffo, the first contracted foreign soccer players were Rodolfo Piazza, the Paraguayan Luis Martínez who achieved the first team's goal, and Gerald Laterza. In its start, the team was known as the "Franela Roja" (Red Bandana).

=== Historical performance ===
Originally, and throughout most of its existence, the team was never a contender to the title, and never received much attention internationally, such as in the prestigious Copa Libertadores. Deportivo Cuenca had a brief successful period during the 1970s, becoming runner-up twice in 1975 & 1976. The favorable finishes allowed them to participate in the next year's Copa Libertadores. Throughout the 1980s and 1990s, the club was in-and-out of the second tier Serie B. They returned to Serie A in 2003, and in 2004, they became the second club outside Quito or Guayaquil to win the national championship. Since then, they have finished in the top three in three of four seasons, allowing them to participate in five of the past six Copa Libertadores.

== Colors and badge ==
Deportivo Cuenca's historical kit has been red shirts with black shorts. Alternate kits, like most teams in Ecuador, varied from year to year. The badge of the team includes elements of the seal of the city of Cuenca.

== Championship Year ==
In 2004, Deportivo Cuenca won the first championship in the organization’s history. The process began with Argentine coach Daniel Córdoba joining the club's Javier Klimowicz, Marcelo Velazco, and national Giancarlos Ramos. After a successful start, Coach Córdoba resigned from his position halfway through the season. Cuenca had already qualified for the playoffs and hired Córdoba’s replacement Julio "Turco" Asad.

Deportivo Cuenca secured a playoff berth on December 8, 2004, with two games left in the regular season. With 19.5 points, Deportivo Cuenca was unreachable for Barcelona and Olmedo, who were runners up. That day Cuenca won 3–2 against Aucas in Quito, but the celebration began after the end of the game between El Nacional, and LDU Quito. The tie produced between those competitors allowed the Morlacos to be unreachable. Fans took to the streets to celebrate, thousands of vehicles blew their horns with explosions of rockets and fireworks lighting up the sky. The victory had caused such excitement in the fans that it forced the opening of the stadium where thousands of fans cheered on the team. Prior to that, there was a motorcade from the airport to the Alejandro Serrano Aguilar Stadium.

== Nicknames ==
The club has several nicknames, the best known is "Morlacos", and "Expresso Austral" (Southern Express), the first is because people belonging to the city of Cuenca are commonly called so, the second was placed by the national press in the 1970s due to the campaigns being undertaken by the team, calling the team the southern train, a southern Express, as a visual depiction of overpassing its opponents.

It is also popularly called "Red" because of its kit shirt. The club was well known in its infancy, as "Red Flannel" because of the fabric and the color of their clothing. It is less commonly recognized as the "lion" because this is also the symbol of the city and is present in the emblem of the institution.

== Honours ==
=== National ===
- Serie A
  - Winners (1): 2004
- Serie B
  - Winners (2): 1972 E2, 1995

=== Regional ===
- Segunda Categoría del Azuay
  - Winners (2): 1983, 1984

== Records ==
In Serie A:

- Seasons: 34
- All-time position: 6
- Best finish: 1st (2004)
- Worst finish: 8th (2006)
- Biggest win: 6–0 vs. Green Cross
- Biggest defeat: 6–2 vs. Macará
- Top scorer: Ángel Luis Liciardi (132 goals)

== Players ==
=== Current squad ===
As of 11 April, 2026

Note: Flags indicate national team as defined under FIFA eligibility rules; some limited exceptions apply. Players may hold more than one non-FIFA nationality.

No.	Pos.	Nation	Player
1	GK	ARG	Facundo Ferrero (on loan from Nueva Chicago)
2	DF	ECU	Ignacio Mosquera
5	MF	ECU	David Noboa
6	DF	ARG	Santiago Postel (on loan from CA Platense)
7	MF	ARG	Lucas Mancinelli
8	MF	ECU	Édison Vega
9	FW	ARG	Nicolás Leguizamón
10	MF	ECU	Romario Ibarra
11	FW	ARG	Germán Rivero
12	GK	ECU	Ethan Minda
13	FW	ECU	Kevin Valencia
14	MF	ECU	Jeremy Chacón
15	MF	ECU	Mathías Solís
16	MF	ECU	Jeremy Mejia
18	DF	ECU	Mateo Piedra

No.	Pos.	Nation	Player
19	FW	ECU	Melvin Diaz (on loan from LDU Quito)
20	MF	ECU	Bryan García
21	MF	ECU	Stalin Morocho
22	GK	ECU	Josué Méndez
23	DF	ECU	Eddie Guevara
25	DF	ECU	Andrés López
28	DF	ARG	Patricio Boolsen
29	FW	ECU	Matías Klimowicz
30	MF	ARG	Mateo Maccari
37	FW	ECU	Carlos Arboleda
43	FW	ECU	Jorge Ordóñez
49	MF	ARG	David González (on loan from Racing Club)
53	DF	ECU	Yeltzin Erique (on loan from LDU Quito)
55	DF	ECU	Félix Angüisaca
57	MF	ECU	Paulo Uruchima

=== Out on loan ===
Note: Flags indicate national team as defined under FIFA eligibility rules; some limited exceptions apply. Players may hold more than one non-FIFA nationality.

No.	Pos.	Nation	Player
—	DF	ECU	Ronny Biojó (at Libertad until 31 December 2025)

== Top goalscorers ==
Deportivo Cuenca has had two players become the top scorer of the Serie A, with one player repeating the feat. The club's all-time top goalscorer is Ángel Luis Liciardi with 132 goals.

- (Argentina) Ángel Luis Liciardi (1974; 19 goals)
- (Argentina) Ángel Luis Liciardi (1975; 36 goals)
- (Argentina) Ángel Luis Liciardi (1976; 35 goals)
- (Argentina) Juan Carlos Ferreyra (2007; 17 goals)

== Managers ==
=== Notable managers ===
Argentine Julio Asad is the only manager to win a title with Deportivo Cuenca, who led them to the Serie A title in 2004.
