= Ecuador–Malaysia relations =

- Ecuador: Malaysia

Ecuador–Malaysia relations are the bilateral relations between Ecuador and Malaysia. Ecuador has an embassy in Kuala Lumpur, while Malaysia has an honorary consul in Quito that is supervised by Malaysian embassy in Santiago. Both countries are members of the Non-Aligned Movement.

== History ==
Diplomatic relations between the two countries have been established since 1994, and since then the relations have been described as "very friendly". The relations are mainly in the economic bilateral relations. High‑level visits have taken place: for example, Malaysia’s then Foreign Minister Syed Hamid Albar visited Ecuador in 2003, and in 2014, Ecuadorian Foreign Minister Ricardo Patiño concluded his first official visit to Malaysia and both began to increase their economic partnership in bilateral relations. A memorandum of understanding (MoU) was also signed during the meeting. In October 2021, Ecuador’s Foreign Minister received the credentials of Malaysia’s ambassador (resident in Chile).

== Economic relations ==
In 2012, the total trade between the countries worth around $142.20 billion with Ecuadorian exports of $22.29 million and imports from Malaysia with $119.91 million. The main Ecuadorian export to Malaysia such as cocoa beans, coffee and seafood while the main imports from Malaysia are mainly semi-conductors and electronic conductors. Several Memorandum of Understanding (MoU) has been signed by both countries to enhance the economic relations. Other than that, an agreement between the Port Klang Authority and the Port Authority of Manta which could connect the ASEAN countries to the South American markets through Ecuador has been signed including an agreement on innovation and technology transfer. The Government of Ecuador also interested on the Malaysian investments in the palm oil sector with one of the Malaysian company, Sime Darby is looking a possibilities to investing in Ecuador. In the education sector, Ecuador has offered The National University of Malaysia (UKM) to participate in a ground-breaking educational project at a new visionary city in the South American country and the country has requested Malaysian institutions of higher learning to take part in the transformation of Ecuador's economy. Furthermore, Malaysia also has funded a monorail project in Rumiñahui and was committed to strengthening bilateral relationship with Ecuador through the realisation of co-operation programs and boosting financing on infrastructure projects in Ecuador.

== See also ==
- Foreign relations of Ecuador
- Foreign relations of Malaysia
