= List of ambassadors of the Sahrawi Arab Democratic Republic to Ecuador =

Sahrawi Ambassador to Ecuador
- Sahrawi coat of arms
- Incumbent; Ahmed Mohamed Hemeiduha since June 2022
- Ministry of Foreign Affairs
- Style: His Excellency
- Appointer: The president
- Inaugural holder: Alisalem Sirizeyn
- Formation: September 2015

The ambassador of the Sahrawi Arab Democratic Republic to Ecuador was the official representative of the Sahrawi Arab Democratic Republic (SADR) to Ecuador. The Sahrawi Arab Democratic Republic's embassy in Ecuador was located in Quito.

Ecuador first recognised the SADR in 1983, although relations were then frozen until February 8, 2006. An embassy was then opened in 2015.

In October 2024, Ecuador suspended its official recognition of the Sahrawi Arab Democratic Republic (SADR).

== List of representatives ==
Name	Term begin	Term end	President	Notes
Alisalem Sirizeyn	September 2015	2022	Mohamed Abdelaziz	First resident ambassador to Ecuador. He presented his credentials on September 28.
Ahmed Mohamed Hemeiduha	June 2022	2024	Brahim Ghali	Second ambassador to Ecuador. He presented his credentials in June 2022.

== See also ==
- Foreign relations of Ecuador
- Foreign relations of the Sahrawi Arab Democratic Republic
