= List of permanent representatives of Ecuador to the Organization of American States =

This is a list of permanent representatives of Ecuador to the Organization of American States.

- 1960-1968: Gonzalo Escudero
- 2007-May 2009: Efrén Cocíos
- 2009-July 2010: Francisco Proaño
- July 2010-September 13, 2013: María Isabel Salvador
- September 13, 2013-December 21, 2017: Marco Vinicio Albuja Martínez
- December 21, 2017-May 4, 2018:José Valencia Amores
- May 4, 2018-May 24, 2021: Carlos Alberto Jativa Naranjo
