= Ecuador–India relations =

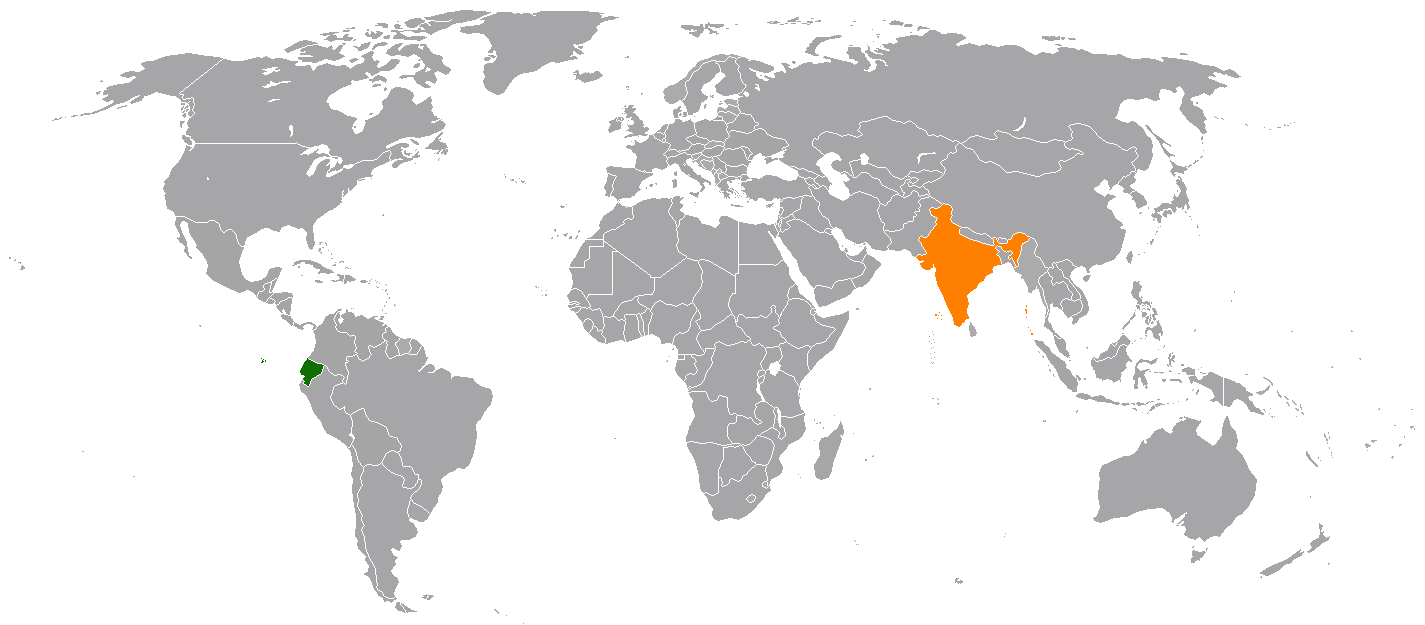
- Ecuador: India

Ecuador–India relations are the international relations that exist between Ecuador and India. Ecuador has an embassy in New Delhi. India has an embassy in Quito.

== History ==
Ecuador and India established diplomatic relations in 1969. Ecuador first opened its embassy in New Delhi in 1973, but closed it in 1977. The embassy operated again between 1984 and 1985, before opening again in February 2005, and a consulate general in Mumbai in 2013. The repeated opening and closure of the embassy was because of the expense incurred by Ecuador to maintain an embassy. India's embassy in Quito opened in 2025.

The two countries signed an MoU on holding regular foreign consultations in 2000. The first Foreign Consultation was held in 2005, followed by 2008, 2011 and 2014. Several ministerial level visits between the two countries have taken place. Several Ecuadorean Foreign Ministers and other dignitaries have visited India. From India, the highest level visits to Ecuador have been at the level of minister of state.

The two countries have signed several bilateral agreements on co-operation in the fields of education (2006), agriculture (2008), and economic co-operation (2013). India and Ecuador signed a Protocol on Joint Economic and Trade Committee (JETCO) in October 2015 in New Delhi.

== Trade ==
Bilateral trade between Ecuador and India rose from US$98.9 million in 2009 to $1.29 billion in 2014–15. Bilateral trade declined to $553.14 million in 2015–16. India exported $415.45 million worth of goods to Ecuador, and imported $137.69 million in 2015–16. The main commodities exported by Ecuador to India are mineral fuels/oils, wood and wood articles, cocoa and cocoa preparations, aluminum and related articles, machinery and mechanical appliances, lead, copper, zinc and articles thereof, and miscellaneous manufactured articles. The major commodities imported by Ecuador from India are mineral fuels/oils, iron and steel, pharmaceutical products, vehicles, organic chemicals, plastics and related articles, machinery and mechanical appliances, electrical machinery and equipment, rubber and articles.

On 16 November 2008, the Foreign Minister of Ecuador Maria Isabel Salvador met her counterpart, Pranab Mukherjee, and discussed co-operation in oil and defence. The new government in Ecuador reversed the earlier revenue-sharing arrangements with western oil companies and was keen to start a new partnership with state-owned ONGC Videsh.

An MoU was signed between two state-owned oil companies ONGC Videsh and Petroecuador, and another between the Confederation of Indian Industries (CII) and the Export and Investment Promotion Council of Ecuador (CORPEI) in 2006.

== Defence ==
Ecuador was the first country to purchase Dhruv helicopters, of which one was for use by its president. The Government of Ecuador signed an agreement with HAL to purchase 7 Dhruv helicopters at a total cost of $45.2 million in November 2008. HAL delivered the 7 helicopters to Ecuador between 2009 and 2012. On 11 October 2015, Ecuador stated that it was grounding the fleet, after four of the seven helicopter crashed in separate incidents. The Ecuador Government stated that two helicopters crashed due to pilot error, while the other two were the result of mechanical failures. The Government also accused HAL of failing to ship some spare parts for the helicopters. HAL defended its helicopters stating that over 200 Dhruv helicopters were in service with the Indian military and operating without incident. The company blamed Ecuador's operation of the helicopters for the crashes, and also added that the 24-month warranty period of after-sales service support for the helicopters had already expired. HAL also offered to send a team to Ecuador to resolve any outstanding issues. Ecuador put its three remaining helicopters up for sale in 2016.

Ecuadorian Vice Chief, General Rodrigo Bohorquez, attended Aero India in February 2007 and Brigadier General Raúl Banderas Dueñas attended the Defence Expo in February 2010. Ecuador and India signed an MoU on defence co-operation in 2011.

The Government of Ecuador maintains a Defence Attaché in its embassy in New Delhi. The Defence Attaché at the Embassy of India in Santiago, Chile is jointly accredited to Ecuador.

== Cultural relations ==
Ecuador and India signed an MoU on cultural co-operation in 2006, and a cultural exchange programme between the two countries was held from 2009 to 2011.

As of December 2016, about 350 Indian nationals reside in Ecuador, the majority of whom are employed in the service sector and in small businesses.

== Foreign aid ==
India and Ecuador agreed to set up a Centre for Excellence in Information Technology in August 2009. The centre, located at Northern Technical University (UTN) in Ibarra, was opened in 2015. India donated medicines worth $1 million in 2008 and 2010 at the request of Ecuador. India donated 15 tons of medicines to Ecuador in the aftermath of an earthquake on 16 April 2016.

Citizens of Ecuador are eligible for scholarships under the Indian Technical and Economic Cooperation Programme and the Indian Council for Cultural Relations.
