= Marcelo Velazco =

Uruguayan-born Ecuadorian footballer (born 1970)

Personal information
- Full name: Marcelo René Velazco Ghiena
- Date of birth: 14 February 1970 (age 56)
- Place of birth: Montevideo, Uruguay
- Height: 1.84 m (6 ft 0 in)
- Position: Defender

Team information
- Current team: Deportivo Cuenca (assistant)

Youth career
- NAcional

Senior career*
Years	Team	Apps	(Gls)
1989	Nacional	0	(0)
1995	Cerro	4	(0)
1996	Deportes Iquique	25	(4)
1997	Montevideo Wanderers		
1998–1999	Frontera Rivera	27	(9)
2000	Danubio		(1)
2001–2002	Aucas	66	(10)
2003–2005	Deportivo Cuenca	108	(14)
2006–2007	Deportivo Quito	71	(5)
2008	Macará	32	(2)
2009	Técnico Universitario	8	(1)

Managerial career
- 2018–2019: Deportivo Cuenca (assistant)
- 2019: Barcelona SC (assistant)
- 2023–: Deportivo Cuenca (assistant)
- 2024: Deportivo Cuenca (interim)
- * Club domestic league appearances and goals

Marcelo René Velazco Ghiena (born 14 February 1970) is a Uruguayan former naturalized Ecuadorian footballer who played for clubs of Uruguay, Chile and Ecuador.

== Career ==
- (Uruguay) Nacional 1989
- (Uruguay) Cerro 1995
- (Chile) Deportes Iquique 1996
- (Uruguay) Montevideo Wanderers 1997
- (Uruguay) Frontera Rivera 1998–1999
- (Uruguay) Danubio 2000
- (Ecuador) Aucas 2001–2002
- (Ecuador) Deportivo Cuenca 2003–2005
- (Ecuador) Deportivo Quito 2006–2007
- (Ecuador) Macará 2008
- (Ecuador) Técnico Universitario 2009

== Personal life ==
Velazco naturalized Ecuadorian.

== Honours ==
- (Ecuador) Deportivo Cuenca 2004 (Ecuadorian Primera División Championship)
