= Ecuador–Russia relations =

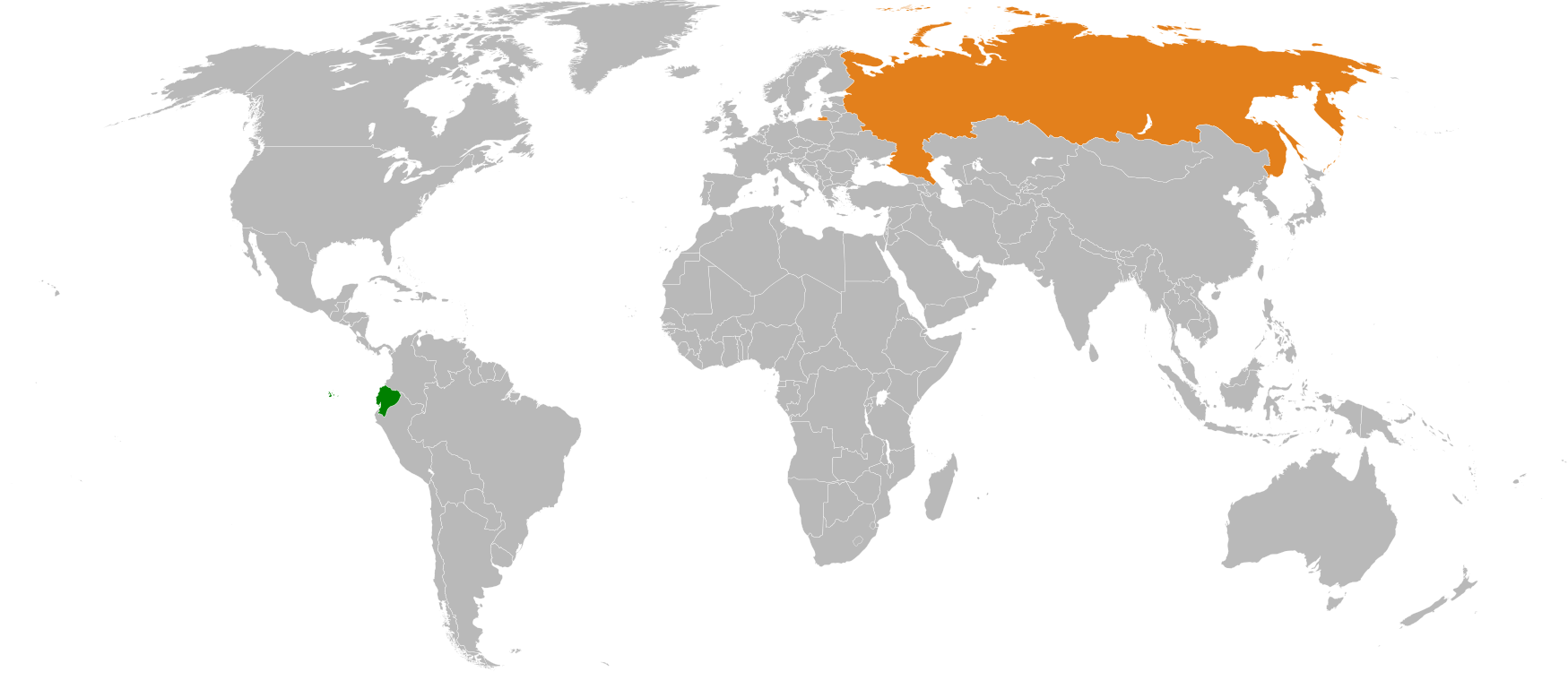
- Ecuador: Russia

Ecuador–Russia relations are the bilateral foreign relations between Ecuador and Russia. Both nations are members of the United Nations.

Ecuador was one country of the countries that offered Edward Snowden political asylum while he was in Moscow's Sheremetyevo International Airport.

== Resident diplomatic missions ==
- Ecuador has an embassy in Moscow.
- Russia has an embassy in Quito.
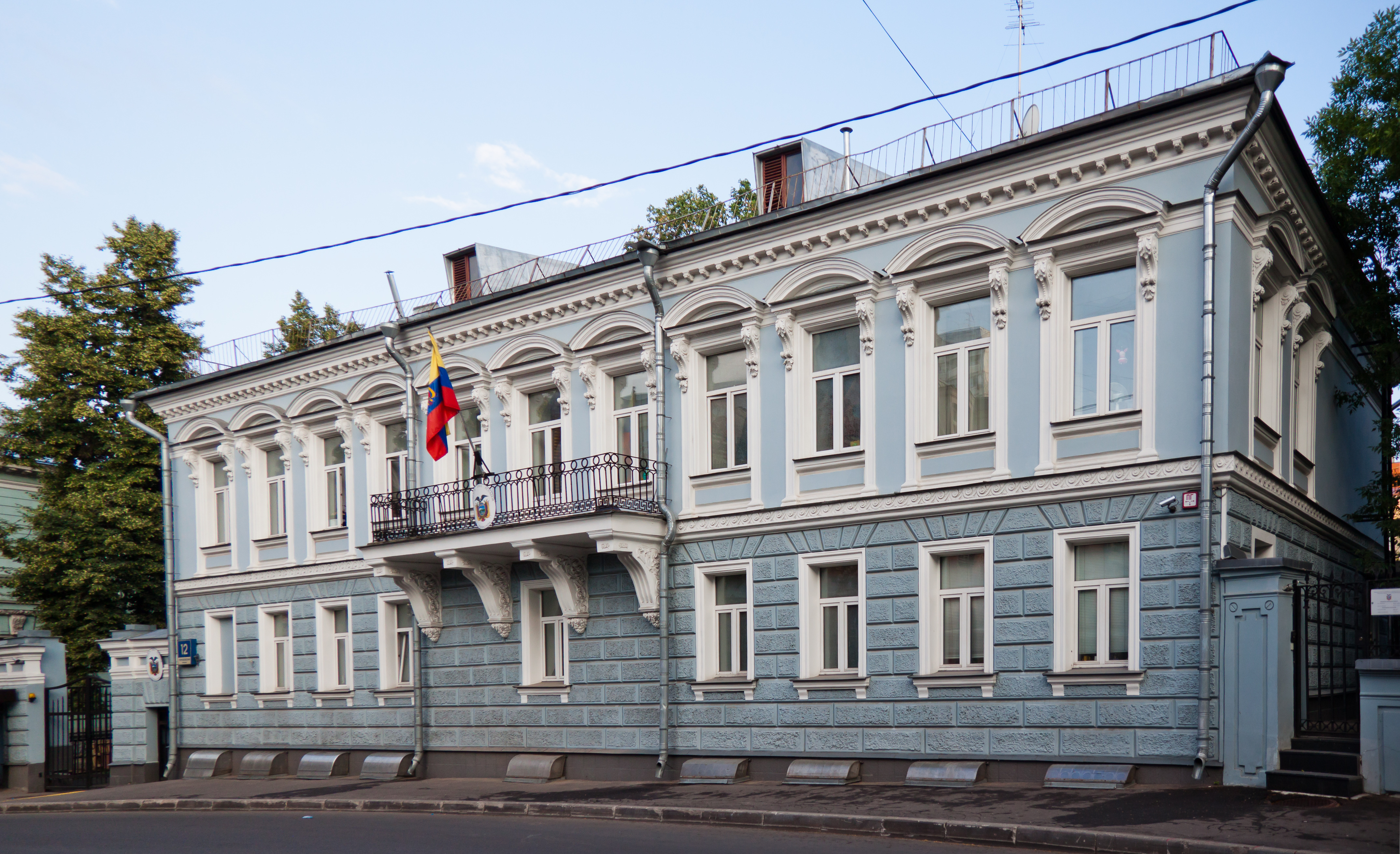
Embassy of Ecuador in Moscow

== See also ==
- List of ambassadors of Russia to Ecuador
