= María Isabel Salvador =

Ecuadorian diplomat (born 1962)

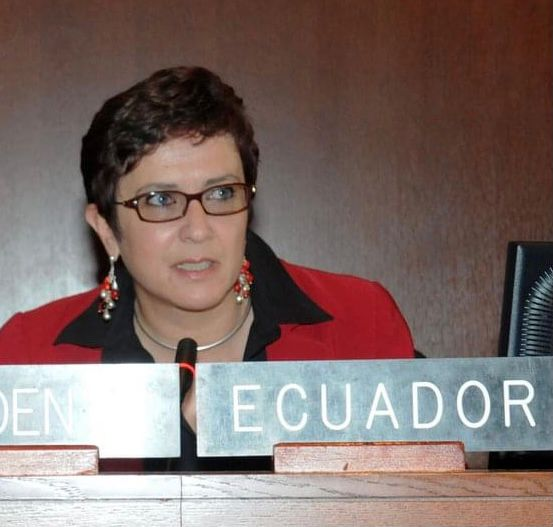

Minister of Tourism
- In office April 25, 2005 – January 15, 2007
- President: Alfredo Palacio
- Preceded by: Gladys Eljuri

Minister of Tourism
- In office January 15, 2007 – December 7, 2007
- President: Rafael Correa
- Succeeded by: Verónica Sión

Minister of Foreign Affairs, Commerce and Integration
- In office December 7, 2007 – December 15, 2008
- President: Rafael Correa
- Preceded by: María Fernanda Espinosa
- Succeeded by: Fander Falconí

Representative of Ecuador to the Andean Parliament
- In office August 5, 2009 – July 20, 2010
- President: Rafael Correa

Permanent Representative of Ecuador to the OAS
- In office July 20, 2010 – July 20, 2013
- Preceded by: Francisco Proaño
- Succeeded by: Marco Albuja

President of the Governing Council of the Galapagos Islands
- In office August 15, 2013 – April 2015
- Preceded by: Jorge Torres
- Succeeded by: Eliecer Cruz

Personal details
- Born: 28 January 1962 (age 64) Quito, Ecuador
- Parent(s): Jorge Salvador Lara and Teresa Crespo Toral
- Education: pp

María Isabel Salvador Crespo (born 28 January 1962) is an Ecuadorian politician, diplomat and professional in the tourism industry. Currently, she serves as the Special Representative of the United Nations Secretary General for Haiti, appointed by UN Secretary General Antonio Guterres in March 2023. She has served in two administrations as Minister of Tourism, Minister of Foreign Affairs, Permanent Representative of Ecuador to the Organization of American States, Parliamentarian at the Andean Parliament, and President of the Governing Council of the Galápagos. Before the public service chapter of her life she worked in the tourism industry as CEO of Air France in Ecuador and vicepresident of the national tourism chamber of commerce CAPTUR.

Salvador was born in Quito, Ecuador into a family of politicians and writers. Her father, Jorge Salvador Lara was a lifelong politician and op-ed writer at newspaper El Comercio. Her mother, Teresa Crespo Toral was a poet and author of children's literature. Salvador grew up in Quito where she attended Cardinal Spellman School and Pontificia Universidad Católica del Ecuador where she studied law. She subsequently obtained a degree in French Language and Civilization by the University of Geneva. Salvador also possesses degrees by Universidad San Francisco de Quito and Universidad Andrés Bello.

As Minister of Foreign Affairs in 2008, Salvador lead the Ecuadorian diplomatic strategy to address the Angostura Attack eventually managing to obtain a favorable vote for Ecuador at the OAS General Assembly condemning the military action by Colombia.

In 2023, she was selected to hold the dual position of Special Representative for Haiti of the United Nations Secretary-General and Head of the UN Integrated Office in Haiti (BINUH).
