= Ecuador–Japan relations =

- Ecuador: Japan

Ecuador–Japan relations are the diplomatic relations between Ecuador and Japan. Both nations are members of the Forum of East Asia–Latin America Cooperation.

== History ==
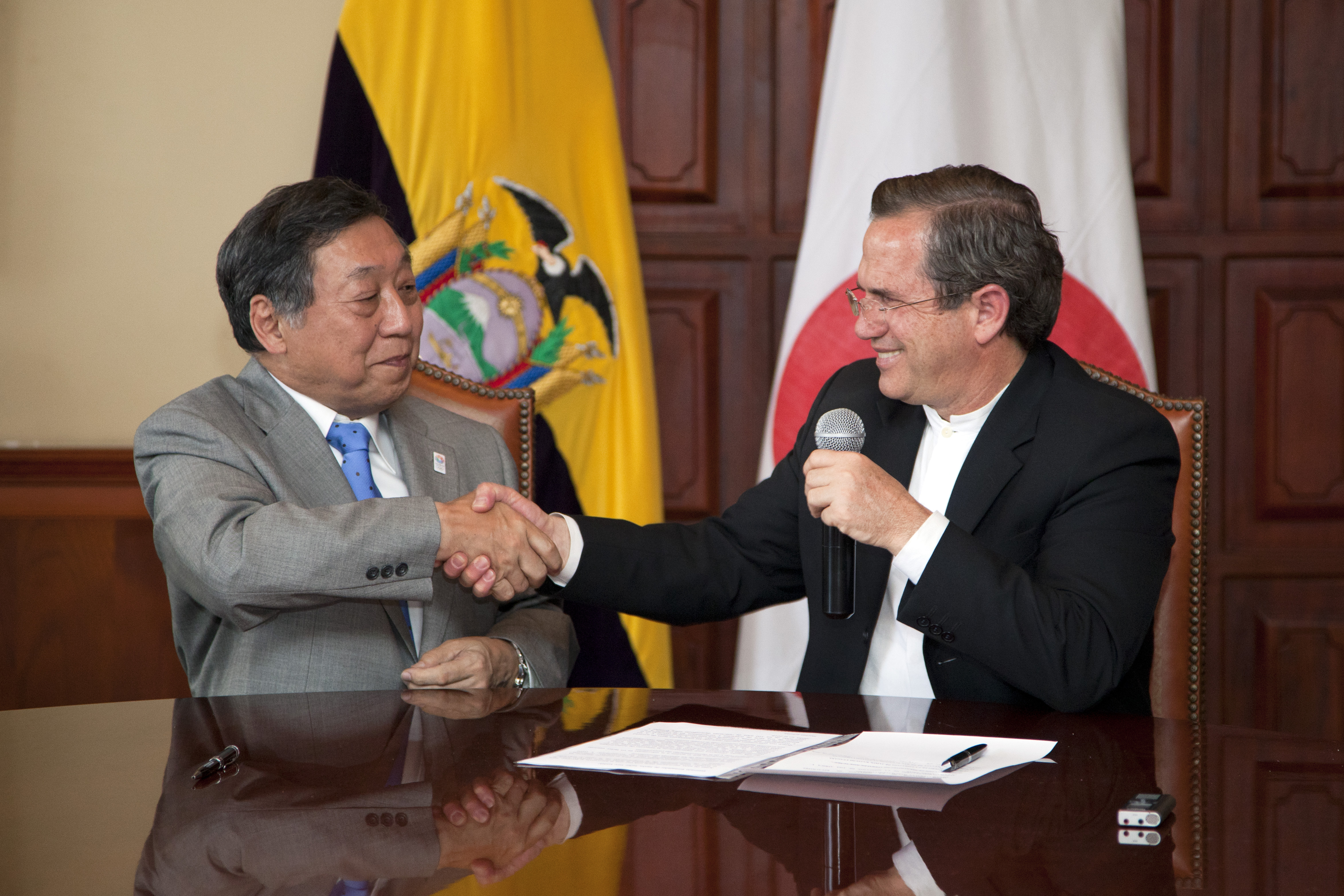
Ecuadorian Foreign Minister Ricardo Patiño and Japanese Ambassador to Ecuador, Toru Kodaki after signing an agreement for Japan to donate audiovisuales to Ecuador; 2013.

In the early part of the twentieth century, unlike other South American nations, very few Japanese people immigrated to Ecuador even though the Japanese government at the time did promote it. The first official contact between Ecuador and Japan took place on 26 August 1918 in Washington, D.C. when both nations signed a Treaty of Friendship, Trade and Navigation which officially established diplomatic relations between both nations. That same year, Ecuador opened a consulate in Yokohama. In 1934, Japan opened a diplomatic legation in Ecuador. A few years later, Ecuador appointed author Jorge Carrera Andrade as consul to Japan.

Initially during World War II, Ecuador remained neutral, however, after the Attack on Pearl Harbor Ecuador changed its position to reflect that of other Latin American nations and severed diplomatic relations with the Axis powers (which included Japan) in January 1942. Furthermore, following other Latin American countries lead, Ecuador deported several Japanese migrants and Ecuadorians of Japanese descent to the United States where they were placed in internment camps. Diplomatic relations between Ecuador and Japan were re-established in 1954.

In 1961, both nations upgraded their resident diplomatic legations to embassies. In 1979, the Japanese Association in Quito and the Japanese International School were established in Ecuador. In 1990, the Japan International Cooperation Agency established a presence in Ecuador. Since the re-establishment of diplomatic relations between both nations, there have been several high-level visits between leaders of both nations. In September 2018, Ecuadorian President Lenín Moreno paid an official visit to Japan and met with Emperor Akihito and Prime Minister Shinzō Abe. The visit comes after both nations have signed several bilateral agreements and to celebrate 100 years of diplomatic relations between both nations.

== High-level visits ==
Presidential visits from Ecuador to Japan

- President Gustavo Noboa (2002)
- President Rafael Correa (2010)
- President Lenín Moreno (2018)

High-level visits from Japan to Ecuador

- Foreign Vice-Minister Shigeo Uetake (2002)
- Foreign Vice-Minister Katsuhito Asano (2007)
- Foreign Vice-Minister Ryuji Yamane (2012)
- Foreign Minister Tarō Kōno (2018)

== Agreements ==
Both nations have signed a few bilateral agreements, such as a Treaty of Friendship, Trade and Navigation (1918); Agreement on Technical Cooperation (1992); Agreement in Health Cooperation (2014); Agreement of Cooperation in Agriculture (2014); Memorandum of Cooperation in Knowledge and Information (2018) and an Agreement of Cooperation in Energy (2018).

== Trade and Investment ==
In 2017, trade between Ecuador to Japan totaled US$800 million. Ecuador's main exports to Japan include: cacao, shrimp, bananas, broccoli and minerals. Japan's main exports to Ecuador include: automobiles and parts; and specialized machinery. Between 2022 and 2023 Japan invested over US$1.2 million in Ecuador.

== Resident diplomatic missions ==
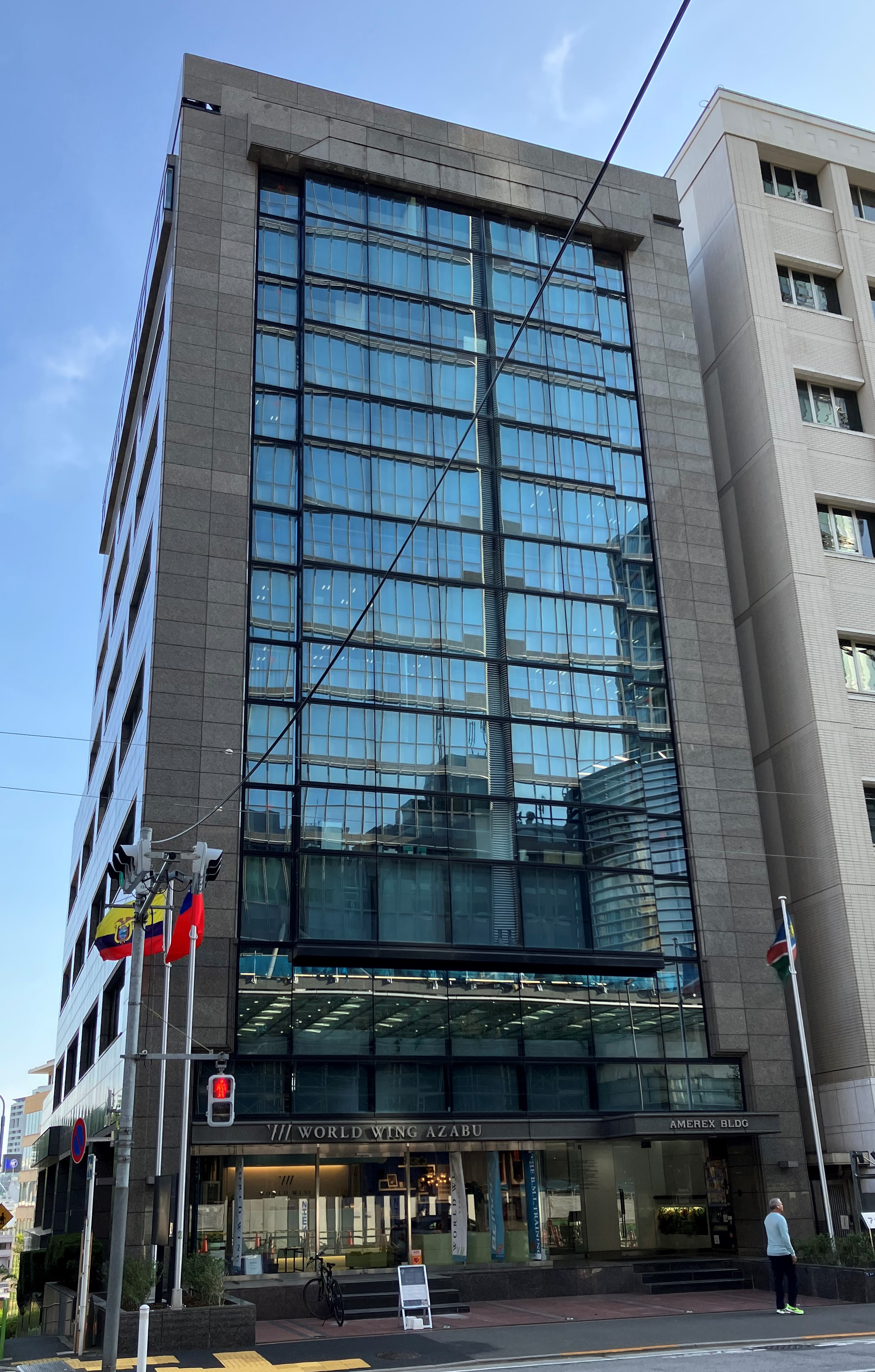
Embassy of Ecuador in Tokyo

- Ecuador has an embassy in Tokyo.
- Japan has an embassy in Quito.
