= Chile–Ecuador relations =

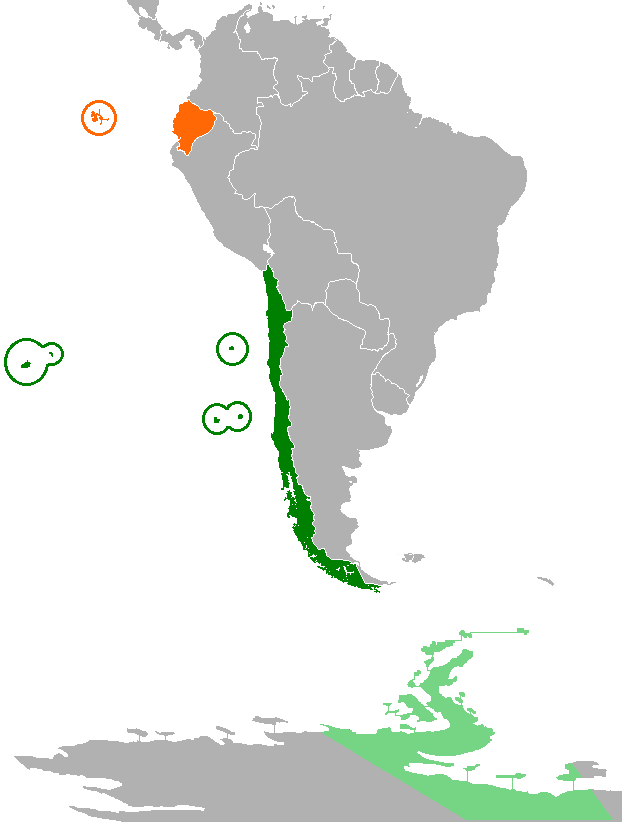
- Chile: Ecuador

Chile–Ecuador relations refer to official and bilateral tie between Chile and Ecuador. Two countries have embassies in respective capitals.

The two nations build a strong and strategic alliance as both Ecuador and Chile share common foe toward Peru, and till this day, two countries have boosted strong cooperation.

== History ==
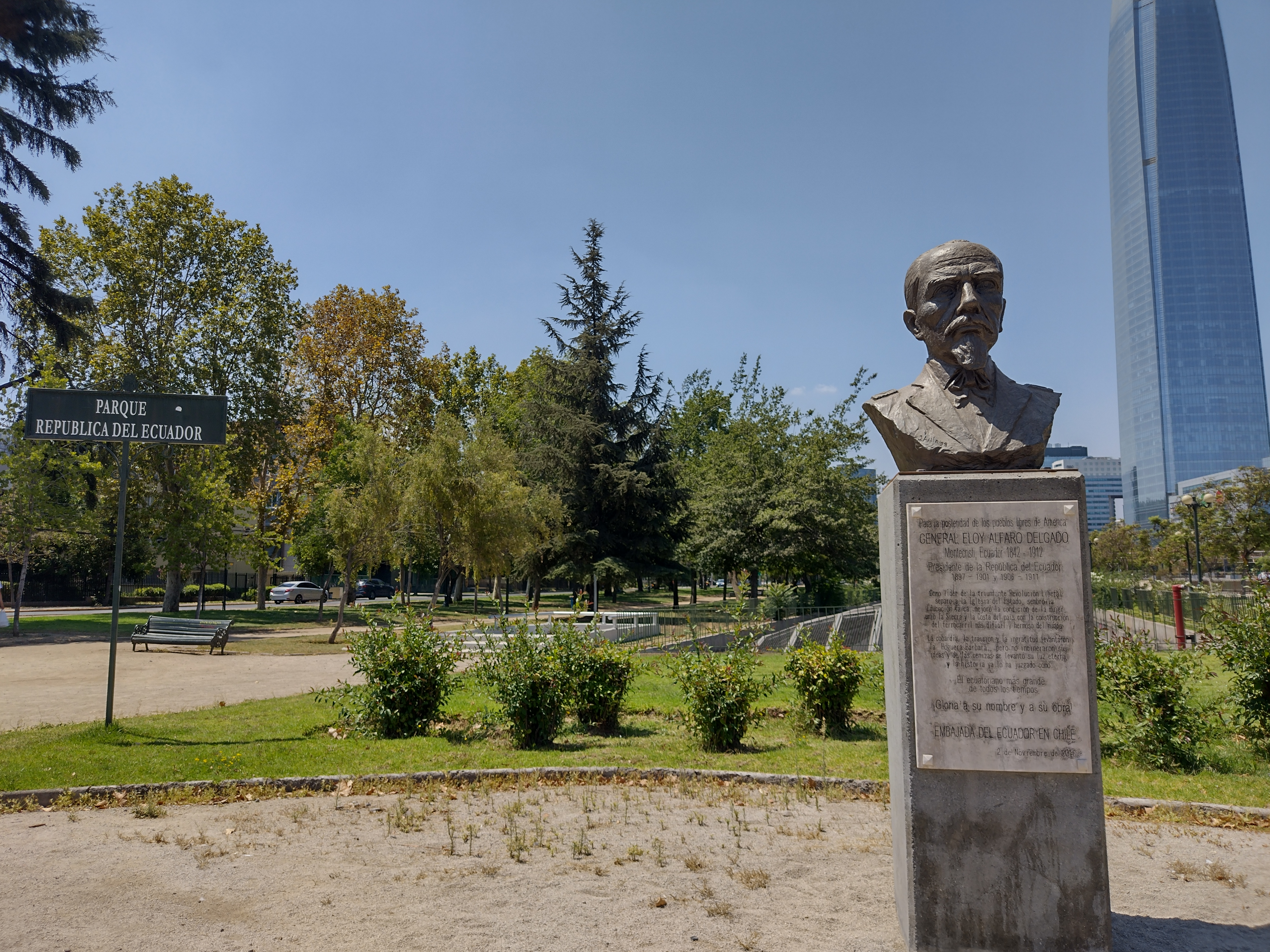
Plaza República del Ecuador in Providencia, Santiago, with the bust of General Eloy Alfaro and the Gran Torre in the background

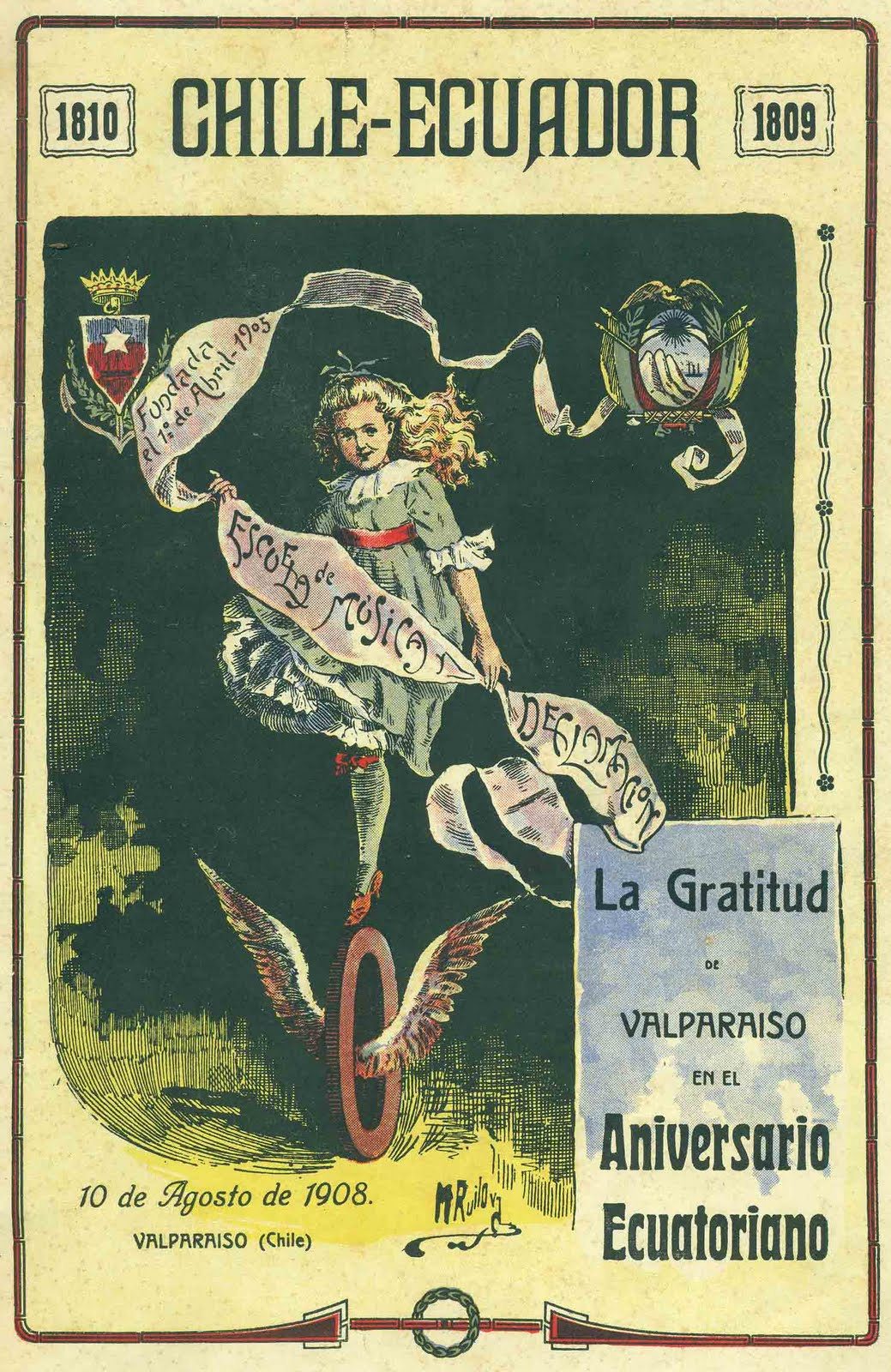
A publication produced in Valparaíso in 1908 in tribute to the centenary of the independence of Chile and Ecuador

Chile and Ecuador were both parts of the Spanish Empire until the Latin American wars of independence that saw Ecuador and Chile together freed from Spanish domination. However, in most of mid-19th century, Chile and Ecuador were mostly trade partners and little to none of their relations had been recorded.

However, due to the War of the Pacific, Chile and Ecuador became strategic allies as relations with Peru worsened. Chile had invaded Peru during the war, while Ecuador had historical boundary conflict with Peru. This strategic alliance boosted as Ecuador and Chile together faced increasing Peruvian scrutiny toward two countries, and the strategic alliance remains still today. Military cooperation with Ecuador grew considerably after the War of the Pacific with Chile sending instructors to the military academy in Quito and selling superfluous arms and munitions to Ecuador. Despite Chile's over-all good relations with Ecuador both countries had a minor diplomatic crisis resulting from the capture of the Peruvian torpedo boat Alay in Ecuadorian territorial waters during the war.

Throughout the 20th century, Ecuador and Chile had deepened their alliance. Though Chile was part of ABC Pact composing Brazil, Chile and Argentina, Chile had sided with Ecuador in a number of conflict with Peru. Chile acted as mediator for Ecuador during the 1941 Ecuadorian–Peruvian War. Chile together with the other ABC Powers and the USA were among the guarantors of the Rio Protocol that followed the Ecuadorian–Peruvian War in 1942.

Chile had secretly supported Ecuador during the Cenepa War against Peru, providing worth 600 million dollars arms for Ecuadorian Armed Forces. Peru had accused Chile for meddling on its affairs and demanded Chile to stay out from the conflict. Chile also helped negotiating for Ecuador post-Cenepa War.

== Economic and military cooperation ==
In June 2018, the presidents of both countries announced their commitment to formally advance negotiations toward a Free Trade Agreement between Chile and Ecuador, considering that in 2018 bilateral trade grew by 8.6%, reaching a total of 2.109 billion USD.

On 13 August 2020, the Commercial Integration Agreement between the Republic of Ecuador and Chile was signed via a virtual link. The agreement, signed by Presidents Lenín Moreno and Sebastián Piñera, replaced Economic Complementation Agreement No. 65, which had been signed on 10 March 2008. The new agreement contains 24 chapters, including provisions on agriculture, public procurement, market access, electronic commerce, among others. It was estimated that around 710 Ecuadorian companies exporting 1.614 billion USD annually to Chile would be the main beneficiaries of the treaty. According to the Ecuadorian president, maize and rice could be exported to Chile under improved conditions, while sugar and its tariff subheadings, representing 21,000 tonnes, would be exported duty-free.

Ecuador and Chile had already had an agreement known as the Economic Complementation Agreement, which had been in force since 2010. That document allowed 97% of Ecuadorian goods sent to that market to be free of tariffs. The new text achieves 100% coverage for Ecuador.

In tourism, since 2008 the Ecuadorian government has abolished tourist visas for citizens of all nationalities (with some exceptions) for a maximum stay of 90 days. The government of Chile, applying the principle of reciprocity, grants the same exemption to Ecuadorian citizens. With the aim of facilitating the free movement of people between South American countries for tourism purposes, both Chileans and Ecuadorians are exempt from using a passport to enter the respective country, requiring only a valid and current national identity card.

In macroeconomic terms, Chile mainly exports to Ecuador non-alcoholic compound preparations for beverages, fruits (apples, grapes, and peaches), copper-derived products, and medicines. Ecuador mainly exports crude petroleum oils, fruits (bananas, pineapples, and hearts of palm), tuna, and shrimp to Chile.

In 2022, trade between the two countries amounted to 1.705 billion USD, representing an average annual growth of –4.3% over the last five years. Chile’s main exports were food preparations, tanker ships, and fresh apples, while Ecuador mainly exported crude petroleum oils and bananas.

Ecuador and Chile have increased their humanitarian and economic collaboration. There is a strong student exchange between Ecuador and Chile. Chile and Ecuador also have strong economic ties as two nations work in agriculture, industrialization and natural resource collaboration.

In 2024, bilateral trade between Chile and Ecuador totaled $1.436 billion, with Ecuador maintaining a $417 million trade surplus. Ecuadorian exports to Chile reached $926 million, led by crude petroleum ($527 million), bananas ($134 million), and processed fish ($43.1 million). Conversely, Chilean exports to Ecuador totaled $510 million, led by edible preparations ($60.3 million), apples and pears ($53.3 million), and packaged medicaments ($40.1 million). In August 2026, monthly bilateral trade recorded $95.4 million in Ecuadorian exports to Chile and $60.2 million in Chilean exports to Ecuador.

Two countries also share military and defensive pact.

== Diplomatic missions ==
- Chile has an embassy in Quito and a consulate-general in Guayaquil.
- Ecuador has an embassy in Santiago.
