= Jubilee USA Network =

US nonprofit financial reform organization

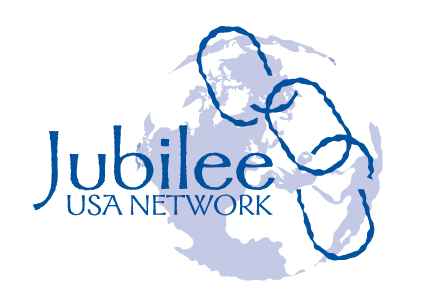
- Type: Non-profit
- Purpose: Financial Reform / Anti-Poverty Advocacy
- Headquarters: Washington, D.C.
- Members: Non-profits, Faith Communities and Congregations
- Executive Director: Eric LeCompte
- Main organ: Board of Directors
- Affiliations: ActionAid International USA, AFL-CIO, American Jewish World Service, Church World Service, Episcopal Church USA, Evangelical Lutheran Church in America, Friends of the Earth, Leadership Conference of Women Religious, Mennonite Central Committee, Presbyterian Church (U.S.A.), Religious Action Center of Reform Judaism, Sojourners Community, Unitarian Universalist Association, United Church of Christ - Neighbors in Need, United Methodist Church - General Board of Church and Society. (partial list)
- Website: jubileeusa.org

Jubilee USA Network is a nonprofit financial reform organization based in Washington, D.C. Jubilee USA's work began in conjunction with the global Jubilee 2000 movement, founded in the late 1990s to advocate for debt relief for developing countries. It is "an alliance of more than 75 U.S. organizations, 750 faith communities and 50 Jubilee global partners."

== Origin and mission ==
The name "Jubilee" is derived from the Biblical Jubilee in Leviticus, a system of debt cancellation, land restoration and liberation from bondage embedded in a 7-year cycle. Jubilee USA is located in Washington, D.C. and is a coalition of approximately 75 national religious and development organizations and about 400 communities of faith across the country. It describes its mission as "building an economy that serves, protects and promotes the participation of the most vulnerable".

== Advocacy ==
Jubilee USA primarily advocates for financial reforms that argues to help impoverished communities. Those reforms include rules governing "responsible lending and borrowing", halting corporate tax avoidance, particularly in the developing world, reforming international financial institutions like the International Monetary Fund (IMF), creating an international bankruptcy system and advancing trade policies that promote the common good.

== Leadership ==
Jubilee USA is governed by a steering committee ("Network Council") that consists of roughly 75 national organizations and a board of directors. Many of the organizations are religious, including American Jewish World Service, Church World Service, a number of Catholic orders and the national Lutheran, Presbyterian, Methodist, Unitarian, Episcopal and United Church of Christ churches. Other notable groups on the council include the AFL–CIO and ActionAid.

== Core issues ==
=== Responsible lending and borrowing ===
One of Jubilee USA's stated main goals is to promote principles of Responsible Lending and Borrowing. These principles would purportedly guide lending decisions made by governments and international financial institutions, such as the World Bank and International Monetary Fund. Jubilee USA's Executive Director, Eric LeCompte, was part of the United Nations Conference on Trade and Development (UNCTAD) working group that created a document called Principles on Promoting Sovereign Lending and Borrowing. The UNCTAD principles guide lending and borrowing decisions. For lending countries, the principles include ensuring that borrowing countries have the capacity to pay back the loan and adhering to UN sanctions. For borrowers, the principles include ensuring that information about the nature of the debt negotiations are available to all stakeholders, including citizens, as well as ensuring that governments avoid over-borrowing.

In 2008, Jubilee USA introduced legislation aimed at increasing debt cancellation for developing countries and instituting lending and borrowing guidelines. The Jubilee Act for Responsible Lending and Expanded Debt Cancellation passed the House of Representatives by a vote of 285–132 but was not adopted by the Senate. According to the Library of Congress summary, the legislation would have directed the US government to work within the IMF, Paris Club, World Bank and other institutions to expand previous debt cancellation programs for developing countries. It would have also directed the Treasury Secretary to "commence immediate efforts to establish a framework for responsible lending". The bill was sponsored by Congresswoman Maxine Waters (D-CA) and cosponsored by 104 House members.

=== Corporate tax avoidance ===
The organization aims to stop corporate tax avoidance and to promote financial transparency and accountability. It argues that poor countries are forced to borrow money (and thus increase debt burdens) because of a lack of domestic revenue, and that corporate tax avoidance is a large factor in that lack of revenue. Jubilee USA is a co-founder of the FACT Coalition, which includes groups such as Global Financial Integrity, US Public Interest Research Group and Global Witness.

=== International financial institution reform ===
The organization attempts to reform international financial institutions such as the IMF and World Bank. It ran a multi-year campaign to move the IMF to give several billion dollars' worth of windfall gold sales profits to poor countries. It advocates for transparency in decision-making and policy processes; its work in the Caribbean on IMF debt restructuring has received coverage in the National Catholic Reporter and Inter Press Service.

=== International bankruptcy system ===
The organization's final goal is the formation of an international bankruptcy system for countries. This system would involve a neutral arbiter that would decide the merits of debt claims and process bankruptcy proceeding when countries no longer can service their debts. This issue has received increased coverage in light of the recent Argentina/NML Capital case. Jubilee USA has argued that such a bankruptcy system would prevent this type of litigation by forcing all creditors to negotiate under an existing set of rules and receive equivalent treatment.

=== Vulture funds ===
Jubilee USA is an outspoken critic of the actions of "vulture funds". Vulture funds are entities that buy up the debt of sovereign countries on the secondary market (often for much less than the value of the original debt) and then sue for full repayment. Jubilee USA filed an amicus brief to the Supreme Court in March 2014 in a debt dispute between Argentina and a group of hedge funds.

The case, Argentina vs. NML Capital, stemmed from Argentina's 2001 debt default. After the default, Argentina offered its creditors approximately 30 cents on the dollar to restructure, with about 92% of the creditors accepting the deal. Those not accepting the deal included hedge funds led by NML Capital, a subsidiary of Elliot Management. Elliot is run by Paul Singer, who has past involvement with sovereign debt litigation, particularly in Peru. NML sued Argentina for full re-payment and was awarded approximately $1.5 billion by U.S. Second District Court Judge Thomas P. Griesa. That ruling was upheld by the Second Circuit Court of Appeals. On May 21, Jubilee USA's Executive Director Eric LeCompte met with Argentinean Pope Francis and Vatican Secretary of State Cardinal Pietro Parolin to discuss the ramifications of the court case on the poor, with all parties "critical of the global financial system". In June 2014, the Supreme Court declined to hear Argentina's appeal.

Jubilee USA has been actively involved in the media discussion of the case in the aftermath of the court's decision. Notable examples include The Washington Post, Time, NPR, Democracy Now, The Wall Street Journal, Inter Press Service, and Bloomberg. The organization also commented on the precedent set by the court decision for other countries facing debt litigation, such as Grenada and the DR Congo.

== See also ==
- Jubilee (Biblical)
- Jubilee 2000
- Strike Debt
