= Eric LeCompte (non-profit) =

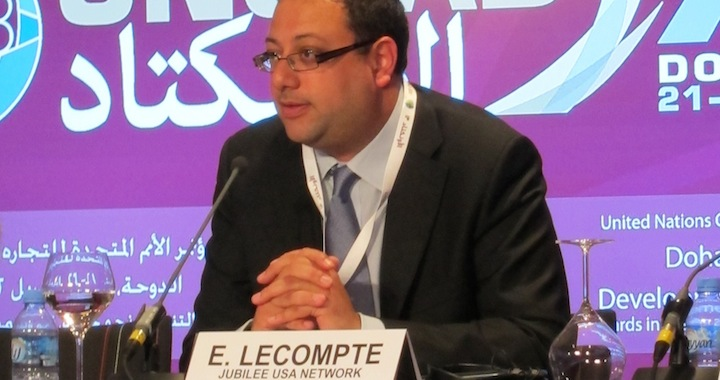
- Eric Lecompte at the Doha Talks
- Years active: 1994-present
- Board member of: Jubilee USA Network, Executive Committee of FACT Coalition

Eric LeCompte is an American commentator on politics, finance and religion. He serves on a working group with the UN Conference on Trade and Development. He is the current executive director of Jubilee USA Network. Prior to working with Jubilee USA, he served as the event coordinator at School of the Americas Watch.

== Early life and career ==
LeCompte holds a Bachelor of Arts degree in sociology from College of Saint Benedict and Saint John's University. LeCompte is the former national council chair of Pax Christi USA. He also previously worked for the School of the Americas Watch, Catholic Worker and Fellowship of Reconciliation.

He is currently the executive director of Jubilee USA Network, a coalition of religious organizations that works for reforms to the international finance system that it argues will reduce poverty.

LeCompte supports a global bankruptcy system for countries as well as greater transparency in the international financial system. LeCompte advised the United Nations Conference on Trade and Development to create a guide for global bankruptcy: "Sovereign Debt Workouts: Going Forward, Roadmap and Guide." After the United Nations General Assembly voted to create a global bankruptcy process for sovereign countries, LeCompte presented to the United Nations on initial steps to create a working process. He has presented on a potential global bankruptcy process to the International Bar Association insolvency section.

After Grenada defaulted on its debt, LeCompte advised religious leaders in Grenada and met with creditors, government officials and the International Monetary Fund (IMF) to secure a debt restructuring that limit austerity plans.

LeCompte has been active in Puerto Rico’s ongoing debt crisis. He worked with Puerto Rico's religious leaders, the Puerto Rican government and the White House and Congress on solutions to the crisis. LeCompte testified on solutions to the crisis before a sub-committee of the House Natural Resources Committee on February 2, 2016. He supported the Puerto Rico Oversight, Management and Economic Stability Act to address the crisis and worked with Puerto Rico's religious leaders to convene a debt dialogue between Puerto Rico's Governor and a representative group of Puerto Rico's creditors.

LeCompte advocates for a global finance system inspired by religious and Biblical teachings that he believes would protect the poor. He comments regularly in religious and mainstream media.

In fall of 2020, LeCompte served as a resident scholar at the Collegeville Institute at the College of Saint Benedict and Saint John's University.
