= List of vice presidents in 2021 =

This is a list of vice presidents in 2021.

== Africa ==
- Angola Vice President - Bornito de Sousa (2017–present)
- Botswana Vice President – Slumber Tsogwane (2018–present)
- Chad Vice-chairmen of Transitional Military Council - Djimadoum Tiraina (2021–present)
- Benin - Vice President - Mariam Chabi Talata (2021–present)
- Burundi - Vice President - Prosper Bazombanza (2020–present)
- Egypt Vice President - vacant (2019–present)
- Equatorial Guinea Vice President - Teodoro Nguema Obiang Mangue (2016–present)
- Gabon Vice President - vacant (2019–present)
- The Gambia Vice President - Isatou Touray (2019–present)
- Ghana Vice President - Mahamudu Bawumia (2017–present)
- Ivory Coast (Côte d'Ivoire) Vice President - vacant (2020–present)
- Kenya Deputy President - William Ruto (2012–present)
- Liberia Vice President - Jewel Taylor (2018–present)
- Libya
  - Government of House of Representatives of Libya (Government of Libya internationally recognized to 12 March 2016)
    - Deputy president of the House of Representatives - Imhemed Shaib (2014–2021)
    - Deputy president of the House of Representatives - Ahmed Huma (2014–2021)
  - Government of National Accord of Libya (Interim government internationally recognized as the sole legitimate government of Libya from 12 March 2016)
    - Vice-Chairmanof the Presidential Council - Abdulsalam Kajman (2016–2021)
    - Vice-Chairmanof the Presidential Council - Ahmed Maiteeq (2016–2021)
  - Government of National Unity of Libya
    - Vice-chairmen of the Presidential Council - Abdullah al-Lafi (2021–present)
    - Vice-chairmen of the Presidential Council - Musa Al-Koni (2021–present)
- Malawi Vice President - Saulos Chilima (2020–present)
- Mali Vice President - Assimi Goïta (2020–2021)
- Mauritius Vice President – Eddy Boissezon (2019–present)
- Namibia Vice President - Nangolo Mbumba (2018–present)
- Nigeria Vice President - Yemi Osinbajo (2015–present)
- Seychelles Vice President - Ahmed Afif (2020–present)
- Sierra Leone Vice President - Mohamed Juldeh Jalloh (2018–present)
- Somaliland Vice President - Abdirahman Saylici (2010–present)
- South Africa Deputy President -David Mabuza (2018–present)
- South Sudan
  - First Vice President - Riek Machar (2020–present)
  - Second Vice President - James Wani Igga (2020–present)
  - Third Vice President - Taban Deng Gai (2020–present)
  - Fourth Vice President - Rebecca Nyandeng Garang (2020–present)
  - Fifth Vice President - Hussein Abdelbagi (2020–present)
- Sudan – Deputy Chairman of the Transitional Sovereignty Council - Hemedti (2019–2023)
- Tanzania Vice President -
  1. Samia Suluhu (2015–2021)
  2. Philip Mpango (2021–present)
  - Zanzibar
    - First Vice President –
    1. Seif Sharif Hamad (2020–2021)
    2. Othman Masoud Sharif (2021–present)
    - Second Vice President – Hemed Suleiman Abdalla (2020–present)
- Uganda Vice President -
  1. Edward Ssekandi (2011–2021)
  2. Jessica Alupo (2021–present)
- Zambia Vice President -
  1. Inonge Wina (2015–2021)
  2. Mutale Nalumango (2021–present)
- Zimbabwe
  - First Vice Presidents – Constantino Chiwenga (2017–present)
  - Second Vice President – Kembo Mohadi (2017–2021)

== Asia ==
- Abkhazia Vice President - Badr Gunba (2020–present)
- Afghanistan
  - Islamic Republic of Afghanistan
    - First Vice President - Amrullah Saleh (2020–2021)
    - Second Vice President - Sarwar Danish (2014–2021)
  - Islamic Emirate of Afghanistan
    - First Deputy Leader – Sirajuddin Haqqani (2021–present)
    - Second Deputy Leader – Mullah Yaqoob (2021–present)
    - Third Deputy Leader – Abdul Ghani Baradar (2021–present)
- Azerbaijan Vice President - Mehriban Aliyeva (2017–present)
- China Vice President - Wang Qishan (2018–present)
- India Vice President - Venkaiah Naidu (2017–present)
- Indonesia Vice President - Ma'ruf Amin (2019–present)
- Iran
  - First Vice President -
    1. Eshaq Jahangiri (2013–2021)
    2. Mohammad Mokhber (2021–present)
  - Others Vice Presidents -
    - Vice President for Economic Affairs -
    1. Mohammad Nahavandian (2017–2021)
    2. Mohsen Rezaei Mirghaed (2021–present)
    - Vice President and Head of Plan and Budget Organisation -
      1. Mohammad Bagher Nobakht (2016–2021)
      2. Seyyed Masoud Mirkazemi (2021–present)
    - Vice President and Head of Administrative and Recruitment Affairs Organisation -
      1. Jamshid Ansari (2016–2021)
      2. Meysam Latifi (2021–present)
    - Vice President for Legal Affairs -
      1. Laya Joneidi (2017–2021)
      2. Mohammad Dehghan (2021–present)
    - Vice President for Parliamentary Affairs -
      1. Hossein-Ali Amiri (2017–2021)
      2. Seyyed Mohammad Hosseini (2021–present)
    - Vice President for Science and Technology Affairs - Sorena Sattari (2013–present)
    - Vice President for Women and Family Affairs -
      1. Masoumeh Ebtekar (2017–2021)
      2. Ensieh KhazAli (2021–present)
    - Vice President and Head of Atomic Energy Organization -
    1. Ali Akbar Salehi (2013–2021)
    2. Mohammad Eslami (2021–present)
    - Vice President and Head of Foundation of Martyrs and Veterans Affairs -
      1. Saeed Ohadi (2020–2021)
      2. Seyyed Amir Hossein Ghazizadeh Hashemi (2021–present)
    - Vice President and Head of Department of Environment -
      1. Isa Kalantari (2017–2021)
      2. Ali Salajegheh (2021–present)
    - Vice President for Executive Affairs - Seyyed Solat Mortazavi (2021–present)
- Iraq
  - Vice President - vacant (2018–present)
  - Vice President - vacant (2018–present)
  - Vice President - vacant (2018–present)
  - Kurdistan
    - First Vice President - Mustafa Said Qadir (2019–present)
    - Second Vice President - Jaafar Sheikh Mustafa (2019–present)
- North Korea (Democratic People's Republic of Korea)
  - Vice presidents de facto
    - First vice-president of State Affairs Commission - Choe Ryong-hae - (2019–present)
    - Vice-president of State Affairs Commission -
      1. Pak Pong-ju (2016–2021)
      2. Kim Tok Hun (2021–present)
  - Vice presidents de jure
    - Vice Chairman of the Standing Committee of Supreme People's Assembly - Pak Yong-il (2019–2022)
    - Vice Chairman of the Standing Committee of Supreme People's Assembly -
      1. Thae Hyong-chol (2019–2021)
      2. Kang Yun Sok (2021–present)
- Laos
  - 1 Vice President - Phankham Viphavanh (2016–2021)
  - 2
    - Vice President – Pany Yathortou (2021–present)
    - Vice President – Bounthong Chitmany (2021–present)
- Maldives Vice President – Faisal Naseem (2018–2023)
- Myanmar
  - First Vice President – Myint Swe (2016–present)
  - Second Vice President – Henry Van Thio (2016–present)
- Nepal Vice President - Nanda Kishor Pun (2015–present)
- Philippines Vice President – Leni Robredo (2016–present)
- Syria
  - Syrian Arab Republic
    - Vice President – Najah al-Attar (2006–2024)
    - Vice President – Ali Mamlouk (2019–2021)
  - Syrian Interim Government
    - First Vice President –
      1. Okab Yahya, (2019–2021)
      2. Abdel Ahad Astifou, (2021–present)
    - Second Vice President – Abdel Hakim Bashar (2019–present)
    - Third Vice President – Ruba Habboush (2020–present)
- Taiwan (Republic of China) Vice President – Lai Ching-te (2020–present)
- Turkey Vice President – Fuat Oktay (2018–2023)
- United Arab Emirates Vice President – Sheikh Mohammed bin Rashid Al Maktoum (2006–present)
- Vietnam Vice President –
  1. Đặng Thị Ngọc Thịnh (2016–2021)
  2. Võ Thị Ánh Xuân (2021–present)
- Yemen
  - Republic of Yemen Vice President – Ali Mohsen al-Ahmar (2016–present)
  - Supreme Political Council (unrecognised, rival government) Deputy Head of the Supreme Political Council - Qassem Labozah (2016–present)

== Europe ==
- Bulgaria Vice President - Iliana Iotova (2017–present)
- Cyprus Vice President - vacant (1974–present)
- Switzerland Vice President - Ignazio Cassis (2021–present)

== North America and the Caribbean ==
- Costa Rica
  - First Vice President - Epsy Campbell Barr (2018–present)
  - Second Vice President - Marvin Rodríguez Cordero (2018–present)
- Cuba Vice President - Salvador Valdés Mesa (2019–present)
- Dominican Republic Vice President - Raquel Peña de Antuña (2020–present)
- El Salvador Vice President – Félix Ulloa (2019–present)
- Guatemala Vice President – Guillermo Castillo (2020–present)
- Honduras
  - First Vice President - Ricardo Antonio Alvarez Arias (2014–2022)
  - Second Vice President - Olga Margarita Alvarado Rodríguez (2018–2022)
  - Third Vice President - María Antonia Rivera Rosales (2018–2022)
- Nicaragua Vice President - Rosario Murillo (2017–present)
- Panama Vice President - Jose Gabriel Carrizo (2019–present)
- United States Vice President -
  1. Mike Pence (2017–2021)
  2. Kamala Harris (2021–present)

== Oceania ==
- Kiribati Vice President – Teuea Toatu (2019–prezent)
- Micronesia Vice President - Yosiwo P. George (2015–present)
- Palau Vice President -
  1. Raynold Oilouch - (2017–2021)
  2. Uduch Sengebau Senior - (2021–present)
- Samoa
  - Member of Council of Deputies – vacant (2017–present)
  - Member of Council of Deputies – vacant (2018–present)
  - Member of Council of Deputies – Le Mamea Ropati (2016–present)

== South America ==
- Argentina Vice President - Cristina Fernández de Kirchner (2019–present)
- Bolivia Vice President - David Choquehuanca (2020–present)
- Brazil Vice President – Hamilton Mourão (2019–present)
- Colombia Vice President - Marta Lucía Ramírez (2018–present)
- Ecuador Vice President -
  1. María Alejandra Muñoz (2020–2021)
  2. Alfredo Borrero (2021–present)
- Guyana
  - First Vice President - Mark Phillips (2020–present)
  - Vice President - Bharrat Jagdeo (2020–present)
- Paraguay Vice President - Hugo Velázquez Moreno (2018–present)
- Peru
  - First Vice President - Dina Boluarte (2021–present)
  - Second Vice President - vacant (2018–present)
- Suriname Vice President – Ronnie Brunswijk (2020–present)
- Uruguay Vice President - Beatriz Argimón (2020–present)
- Venezuela Vice President - Delcy Rodríguez (2018–present)

== See also ==
- List of current vice presidents and designated acting presidents
