= List of vice presidents in 2022 =

This is a list of vice presidents in 2022.

== Africa ==
- Angola Vice President
  - Bornito de Sousa (2017–2022)
  - Esperança da Costa (2022–present)
- Botswana Vice President – Slumber Tsogwane (2018–present)
- Burkina Faso
  - First Vice President of Patriotic Movement for Safeguard and Restoration - vacant (2022–present)
  - Second Vice President of Patriotic Movement for Safeguard and Restoration - vacant (2022–present)
- Benin - Vice President - Mariam Chabi Talata (2021–present)
- Burundi - Vice President - Prosper Bazombanza (2020–present)
- Chad Vice-chairmen of Transitional Military Council - Djimadoum Tiraina (2021–present)
- Egypt Vice President - vacant (2019–present)
- Equatorial Guinea Vice President - Teodoro Nguema Obiang Mangue (2016–present)
- Gabon Vice President - vacant (2019–2023)
- The Gambia Vice President -
  1. Isatou Touray (2019–2022)
  2. Badara Joof (2022–2023)
- Ghana Vice President - Mahamudu Bawumia (2017–present)
- Ivory Coast (Côte d'Ivoire) Vice President -
  - vacant (2020–2022)
  - Tiémoko Meyliet Koné (2022–present)
- Kenya Deputy President -
  1. William Ruto (2012–2022)
  2. Rigathi Gachagua (2022–present)
- Liberia Vice President - Jewel Taylor (2018–present)
- Libya
  - Vice-Chairmen of the Presidential Council - Abdullah al-Lafi (2021–present)
  - Vice-Chairmen of the Presidential Council - Musa Al-Koni (2021–present)
- Malawi Vice President - Saulos Chilima (2020–present)
- Mali Vice President - vacant (2021–present)
- Mauritius Vice President – Eddy Boissezon (2019–present)
- Namibia Vice President - Nangolo Mbumba (2018–present)
- Nigeria Vice President - Yemi Osinbajo (2015–present)
- Seychelles Vice President - Ahmed Afif (2020–present)
- Sierra Leone Vice President - Mohamed Juldeh Jalloh (2018–present)
- Somaliland Vice President - Abdirahman Saylici (2010–present)
- South Africa Deputy President - David Mabuza (2018–2023)
- South Sudan
  - First Vice President - Riek Machar (2020–present)
  - Second Vice President - James Wani Igga (2020–present)
  - Third Vice President - Taban Deng Gai (2020–present)
  - Fourth Vice President - Rebecca Nyandeng Garang (2020–present)
  - Fifth Vice President - Hussein Abdelbagi (2020–present)
- Sudan – Deputy Chairman of the Transitional Sovereignty Council - Hemedti (2019–2023)
- Tanzania Vice President - Philip Mpango (2021–present)
  - Zanzibar
    - First Vice President – Othman Masoud Sharif (2021–present)
    - Second Vice President – Hemed Suleiman Abdalla (2020–present)
- Uganda Vice President - Jessica Alupo (2021–present)
- Zambia Vice President - Mutale Nalumango (2021–present)
- Zimbabwe
  - First Vice Presidents – Constantino Chiwenga (2017–present)
  - Second Vice President – vacant (2021– present)

== Asia ==
- Abkhazia Vice President - Badr Gunba (2020–present)
- Afghanistan
  - First Deputy Leader – Sirajuddin Haqqani (2021–present)
  - Second Deputy Leader – Mullah Yaqoob (2021–present)
  - Third Deputy Leader – Abdul Ghani Baradar (2021–present)
- Azerbaijan Vice President - Mehriban Aliyeva (2017–present)
- China (People's Republic of China) Vice President - Wang Qishan (2018–2023)
- India Vice President –
  1. Venkaiah Naidu (2017–2022)
  2. Jagdeep Dhankhar (2022–present)
- Indonesia Vice President - Ma'ruf Amin (2019–present)
- Iran
  - First Vice President - Mohammad Mokhber (2021–present)
  - Others Vice Presidents -
    - Vice President for Economic Affairs - Mohsen Rezaei Mirghaed (2021–present)
    - Vice President and Head of Plan and Budget Organisation - Seyyed Masoud Mirkazemi (2021–present)
    - Vice President and Head of Administrative and Recruitment Affairs Organisation - Meysam Latifi (2021–present)
    - Vice President for Legal Affairs - Mohammad Dehghan (2021–present)
    - Vice President for Parliamentary Affairs – Seyyed Mohammad Hosseini (2021–present)
    - Vice President for Science and Technology Affairs -
      - Sorena Sattari (2013–2022)
      - Ruhollah Dehghani Firouz Abadi (2022–present)
    - Vice President for Women and Family Affairs - Ensieh KhazAli (2021–present)
    - Vice President and Head of Atomic Energy Organization - Mohammad Eslami (2021–present)
    - Vice President and Head of Foundation of Martyrs and Veterans Affairs - Seyyed Amir Hossein Ghazizadeh Hashemi (2021–present)
    - Vice President and Head of Department of Environment - Ali Salajegheh (2021–present)
    - Vice President for Executive Affairs -
      - Seyyed Solat Mortazavi (2021–2022)
      - Mohsen Mansouri (2022–present)
- Iraq
  - Vice President - vacant (2018–present)
  - Vice President - vacant (2018–present)
  - Vice President - vacant (2018–present)
  - Kurdistan
    - First Vice President - Mustafa Said Qadir (2019–present)
    - Second Vice President - Jaafar Sheikh Mustafa (2019–present)
- North Korea (Democratic People's Republic of Korea)
  - Vice presidents de facto
    - First vice-president of State Affairs Commission - Choe Ryong-hae - (2019–present)
    - Vice-president of State Affairs Commission - Kim Tok Hun (2021–present)
  - Vice presidents de jure
    - Vice Chairman of the Standing Committee of Supreme People's Assembly - Pak Yong-il (2019–2022)
    - Vice Chairman of the Standing Committee of Supreme People's Assembly - Kang Yun Sok (2021–present)
- Laos
  - Vice President – Pany Yathortou (2021–present)
  - Vice President – Bounthong Chitmany (2021–present)
- Maldives Vice President – Faisal Naseem (2018– 2023)
- Myanmar
  - First Vice President – Myint Swe (2016–present)
  - Second Vice President – Henry Van Thio (2016–present)
- Nepal Vice President - Nanda Kishor Pun (2015–2023)
- Philippines - Vice President of the Philippines
  - Leni Robredo (2016–2022)
  - Sara Duterte (2022–present)
- Syria
  - Syrian Arab Republic
    - Vice President – Najah al-Attar (2006–present)
    - Vice President – vacant (2021– present)
  - Syrian Interim Government
    - First Vice President – Abdel Ahad Astifou, (2021–present)
    - Second Vice President – Abdel Hakim Bashar (2019–present)
    - Third Vice President – Ruba Habboush (2020–present)
- Taiwan (Republic of China) Vice President – Lai Ching-te (2020–present)
- Turkey Vice President – Fuat Oktay (2018–present)
- United Arab Emirates Vice President – Sheikh Mohammed bin Rashid Al Maktoum (2006–present)
- Vietnam Vice President – Võ Thị Ánh Xuân (2021–present)
- Yemen
  - Republic of Yemen Vice President – Ali Mohsen al-Ahmar (2016–present)
  - Supreme Political Council (unrecognised, rival government) Deputy Head of the Supreme Political Council - Qassem Labozah (2016–present)

== Europe ==
- Bulgaria Vice President - Iliana Iotova (2017–present)
- Cyprus Vice President - vacant (1974–present)
- Switzerland Vice President - Alain Berset (2022–present)

== North America and the Caribbean ==
- Costa Rica
  - First Vice President -
    1. Epsy Campbell Barr (2018–2022)
    2. Stephan Brunner (2022–present)
  - Second Vice President -
    1. Marvin Rodríguez Cordero (2018–2022)
    2. Mary Munive (2022–present)
- Cuba Vice President - Salvador Valdés Mesa (2019–present)
- Dominican Republic Vice President - Raquel Peña de Antuña (2020–present)
- El Salvador Vice President – Félix Ulloa (2019–present)
- Guatemala Vice President – Guillermo Castillo (2020–present)
- Honduras
  - First Vice President -
    1. Ricardo Antonio Alvarez Arias (2014–2022)
    2. Salvador Nasralla (2022–present)
  - Second Vice President -
    1. Olga Margarita Alvarado Rodríguez (2018–2022)
    2. Doris Gutiérrez (2022–present)
  - Third Vice President -
    1. María Antonia Rivera Rosales (2018–2022)
    2. Renato Florentino (2022–present)
- Nicaragua Vice President - Rosario Murillo (2017–present)
- Panama Vice President - Jose Gabriel Carrizo (2019–present)
- United States Vice President - Kamala Harris (2021–2025)

== Oceania ==
- Kiribati Vice President – Teuea Toatu (2019–prezent)
- Micronesia Vice President –
  1. Yosiwo P. George (2015–2022)
  2. Aren Palik (2022–present)
- Nauru Minister Assisting the President – Martin Hunt (2019–present)
- Palau Vice President – Uduch Sengebau Senior (2021–present)
- Samoa
  - Member of Council of Deputies – vacant (2017–present)
  - Member of Council of Deputies – vacant (2018–present)
  - Member of Council of Deputies – Le Mamea Ropati (2016–present)

== South America ==
- Argentina Vice President - Cristina Fernández de Kirchner (2019–present)
- Bolivia Vice President - David Choquehuanca (2020–present)
- Brazil Vice President – Hamilton Mourão (2019–present)
- Colombia Vice President -
  1. Marta Lucía Ramírez (2018–2022)
  2. Francia Márquez (2022–present)
- Ecuador Vice President - Alfredo Borrero (2021–present)
- Guyana
  - First Vice President - Mark Phillips (2020–present)
  - Vice President - Bharrat Jagdeo (2020–present)
- Paraguay Vice President - Hugo Velázquez Moreno (2018–present)
- Peru
  - First Vice President -
    - Dina Boluarte (2021–2022)
    - vacant (2022–present)
  - Second Vice President - vacant (2020–present)
- Suriname Vice President – Ronnie Brunswijk (2020–present)
- Uruguay Vice President - Beatriz Argimón (2020–present)
- Venezuela Vice President - Delcy Rodríguez (2018–present)

== See also ==
- List of current vice presidents and designated acting presidents
