= List of vice presidents in 2020 =

This is a list of vice presidents in 2020.

== Africa ==
- Angola Vice President - Bornito de Sousa (2017–present)
- Botswana Vice President – Slumber Tsogwane (2018–present)
- Burundi -
  - 1 Vice Presidents
    - First Vice President – Gaston Sindimwo (2015–2020)
    - Second Vice President - Joseph Butore (2015–2020)
  - 2 Vice President - Prosper Bazombanza (2020–present)
- Egypt Vice President - vacant (2019–present)
- Equatorial Guinea Vice President - Teodoro Nguema Obiang Mangue (2016–present)
- Gabon Vice President - vacant (2019–present)
- The Gambia Vice President - Isatou Touray (2019–present)
- Ghana Vice President - Mahamudu Bawumia (2017–present)
- Ivory Coast (Côte d'Ivoire) Vice President - Daniel Kablan Duncan (2017–2020)
- Kenya Deputy President - William Ruto (2012–present)
- Liberia Vice President - Jewel Taylor (2018–present)
- Libya
  - Government of National Accord of Libya (Interim government internationally recognized as the sole legitimate government of Libya from 12 March 2016) - Vice Presidents of the Presidential Council of Libya (Tripoli) - Abdulsalam Kajman (2016–2021), Ahmed Maiteeq (2016–2021)
  - 'Government of House of Representatives of Libya' (Government of Libya internationally recognized to 12 March 2016) Deputy presidents of the House of Representatives of Libya - Imhemed Shaib (2014–2021). Ahmed Huma (2014–2021)
- Malawi Vice President -
  1. Everton Chimulirenji (de facto) (2019–2020)
  2. Saulos Chilima (2020–present)
- Mali
  1. Vice President - Malick Diaw (2020)
  2. Vice President - Assimi Goïta (2020–2021)
- Mauritius Vice President –Eddy Boissezon (2019–present)
- Namibia Vice President -Nangolo Mbumba (2018–present)
- Nigeria Vice President - Yemi Osinbajo (2015–present)
- Seychelles Vice President -
  1. Vincent Meriton (2016–2020)
  2. Ahmed Afif (2020–present)
- Sierra Leone Vice President -Mohamed Juldeh Jalloh (2018–present)
- Somaliland Vice President - Abdirahman Saylici (2010–present)
- South Africa Deputy President -David Mabuza (2018–present)
- South Sudan
  - First Vice President -
    1. Taban Deng Gai (2016–2020)
    2. Riek Machar (2020–present)
  - Vice President - James Wani Igga (2016–2020)
  - Second Vice President - James Wani Igga (2020–present)
  - Third Vice President - Taban Deng Gai (2020–present)
  - Fourth Vice President - Rebecca Nyandeng Garang (2020–present)
  - Fifth Vice President - Hussein Abdelbagi (2020–present)
- Sudan – Deputy Chairman of the Transitional Sovereignty Council - Hemedti (2019–2023)
- Tanzania Vice President - Samia Suluhu (2015–2021)
  - Zanzibar
    - First Vice President – Seif Sharif Hamad (2020–2021)
    - Second Vice President –
      1. Seif Ali Iddi (2010–2020)
      2. Hemed Suleiman Abdalla (2020–present)
- Uganda Vice President - Edward Ssekandi (2011–2021)
- Zambia Vice President - Inonge Wina (2015–2021)
- Zimbabwe
  - First Vice Presidents – Constantino Chiwenga (2017–present)
  - Second Vice President – Kembo Mohadi (2017–2021)

== Asia ==
- Abkhazia Vice President -
  1. Aslan Bartsits (2019–2020)
  2. Badr Gunba (2020–present)
- Afghanistan
  - First Vice President -
    1. Abdul Rashid Dostum (2014–2020)
    2. Amrullah Saleh (2020–2021)
  - Second Vice President - Sarwar Danish (2014–2021)
- Azerbaijan Vice President - Mehriban Aliyeva (2017–present)
- China (People's Republic of China) Vice President - Wang Qishan (2018–present)
- India Vice President - Venkaiah Naidu (2017–present)
- Indonesia Vice President - Ma'ruf Amin (2019–present)
- Iran
  - First Vice President - Eshaq Jahangiri (2013–2021)
  - Others Vice Presidents - Mohammad Nahavandian (Vice President for Economic Affairs) (2017–2021), Mohammad Bagher Nobakht (Vice President and Head of Management and Planning Organization) (2016–2021), Laya Joneidi (Vice President for Legal Affairs) (2017–2021), Hossein-Ali Amiri (Vice President for Parliamentary Affairs) (2017–2021), Sorena Sattari (Vice President for Science and Technology Affaires) (2013–2022), Masoumeh Ebtekar (Vice President for Women's and Family Affairs) (2017–2021), Ali Akbar Salehi (Vice President and Head of Atomic Energy Organization) (2013–2021), Mohammad-Ali Shahidi (Vice President and Head of Martyrs and Veterans Affairs Foundation) (2016–2020). Saeed Ohadi (Vice President and Head of Martyrs and Veterans Affairs Foundation) (2020–2021), Jamshid Ansari (Vice President and Head of Administrative and Recruitment Organization) (2016–2021), Isa Kalantari (Vice President and Head of Environmental Protection Organization) (2017–2021)
- Iraq Vice Presidents - vacant (2018–present)
  - Kurdistan
    - First Vice President - Mustafa Said Qadir (2019–present)
    - Second Vice President - Jaafar Sheikh Mustafa (2019–present)
- North Korea (Democratic People's Republic of Korea)
  - Vice presidents de facto - Vice Chairmen of State Affairs Commission - Choe Ryong-hae (first vice-chairmen - 2019–present), Pak Pong-ju (2016–2021)
  - Vice presidents de jure - Vice Chairmen of the Presidium of Supreme People's Assembly - Pak Yong-il (2019–2022), Thae Hyong-chol (2019–2021)
- Laos Vice President – Phankham Viphavanh (2016–2021)
- Maldives Vice President – Faisal Naseem (2018–2023)
- Myanmar
  - First Vice President – Myint Swe (2016–2021)
  - Second Vice President – Henry Van Thio (2016–present)
- Nepal Vice President - Nanda Bahadur Pun (2015–present)
- Philippines Vice President – Leni Robredo (2016–present)
- Syria
  - Syrian Arab Republic
    - Vice President – Najah al-Attar ((2006–present))
    - Vice President – Ali Mamlouk (2019–2021)
  - Syrian Interim Government
    - First Vice President – Okab Yahya, (2019–2021)
    - Second Vice President – Abdel Hakim Bashar (2019–present)
    - Third Vice President –
      1. Dima Moussa (2018–2020)
      2. Ruba Habboush (2020–present)
- Taiwan (Republic of China) Vice President –
  1. Chen Chien-jen (2016–2020)
  2. Lai Ching-te (2020–present)
- Turkey Vice President – Fuat Oktay (2018–2023)
- United Arab Emirates Vice President – Sheikh Mohammed bin Rashid Al Maktoum (2006–present)
- Vietnam Vice President – Đặng Thị Ngọc Thịnh (2016–2021)
- Yemen
  - Republic of Yemen Vice President – Ali Mohsen al-Ahmar (2016–present)

== Europe ==
- Bulgaria Vice President - Iliana Iotova (2017–present)
- Cyprus Vice President - vacant (1974–present)
- Switzerland Vice President - Guy Parmelin (2020)

== North America and the Caribbean ==
- Costa Rica
  - First Vice President - Epsy Campbell Barr (2018–present)
  - Second Vice President - Marvin Rodríguez Cordero (2018–present)
- Cuba Vice President of Cuba - Salvador Valdés Mesa (2019–present)
- Dominican Republic Vice President -
  1. Margarita Cedeño de Fernández (2012–2020)
  2. Raquel Peña de Antuña (2020–present)
- El Salvador Vice President – Félix Ulloa (2019–present)
- Guatemala Vice President –
  1. Jafeth Cabrera (2016–2020)
  2. Guillermo Castillo (2020–present)
- Honduras
  - First Vice President - Ricardo Antonio Alvarez Arias (2014–2022)
  - Second Vice President - Olga Margarita Alvarado Rodríguez (2018–2022)
  - Third Vice President - María Antonia Rivera Rosales (2018–2022)
- Nicaragua Vice President - Rosario Murillo (2017–present)
- Panama Vice President - Jose Gabriel Carrizo (2019–present)
- United States Vice President - Mike Pence (2017–2021)

== Oceania ==
- Kiribati Vice President – Teuea Toatu (2019-prezent)
- Micronesia Vice President - Yosiwo P. George (2015–present)
- Palau Vice President - Raynold Oilouch - (2017–present)
- Samoa
  - Member of Council of Deputies – vacant (2017–present)
  - Member of Council of Deputies – vacant (2018–present)
  - Member of Council of Deputies – Le Mamea Ropati (2016–present)

== South America ==
- Argentina Vice President - Cristina Fernández de Kirchner (2019–present)
- Bolivia Vice President - David Choquehuanca (2020–present)
- Brazil Vice President – Hamilton Mourão (2019–present)
- Colombia Vice President - Marta Lucía Ramírez (2018–present)
- Ecuador Vice President -
  1. Otto Sonnenholzner (2018–2020)
  2. María Alejandra Muñoz (2020–2021)
- Guyana
  - First Vice President -
    1. Moses Nagamootoo (2015–2020)
    2. Mark Phillips (2020–present)
  - Second Vice President - Khemraj Ramjattan (2015–2020)
  - Third Vice President - vacant (2019–2020t)
  - Fourth Vice President - Sydney Allicock (2015–2020)
  - Vice President - Bharrat Jagdeo (2020–present)
- Paraguay Vice President - Hugo Velázquez Moreno (2018–present)
- Peru
  - First Vice President -
    1. Mercedes Aráoz (2018–2020)
    2. vacant (2020–present)
  - Second Vice President - vacant (2018–present)
- Suriname Vice President -
  1. Ashwin Adhin (2015–2020)
  2. Ronnie Brunswijk (2020–present)
- Uruguay Vice President -
  1. Lucía Topolansky (2017–2020)
  2. Beatriz Argimón (2020–present)
- Venezuela Vice President - Delcy Rodríguez (2018–present)

== See also ==
- List of current vice presidents and designated acting presidents
