= List of vice presidents in 2019 =

This is a list of vice presidents in 2019.

== Africa ==
- Angola Vice President – Bornito de Sousa (2017–present)
- Botswana Vice President – Slumber Tsogwane (2018–present)
- Burundi
  - First Vice President – Gaston Sindimwo (2015–2020)
  - Second Vice President – Joseph Butore (2015–2020)
- Egypt Vice President - vacant (2019–present)
- Equatorial Guinea Vice President – Teodoro Nguema Obiang Mangue (2016–-present)
- Gabon Vice President – Pierre-Claver Maganga Moussavou (2017–2019)
- The Gambia Vice President –
  1. Ousainou Darboe (2018–2019)
  2. Isatou Touray (2019–present)
- Ghana Vice President – Mahamudu Bawumia (2017–present)
- Ivory Coast (Côte d'Ivoire) Vice President – Daniel Kablan Duncan (2017–2020)
- Kenya Deputy President – William Ruto (2012–present)
- Liberia Vice President – Jewel Taylor (2018–present)
- Libya
  - Government of National Accord of Libya (Interim government internationally recognized as the sole legitimate government of Libya from 12 March 2016) – Vice Presidents of the Presidential Council of Libya (Tripoli) – Abdulsalam Kajman (2016–2021), Ahmed Maiteeq (2016–2021), Ali Faraj Qatrani (2016–2019)
  - Government of House of Representatives of Libya (Government of Libya internationally recognized to 12 March 2016) – Deputy presidents of the House of Representatives of Libya – Imhemed Shaib (2014–2021), Ahmed Huma (2014–2021)
- Malawi Vice President –
  1. Saulos Chilima (2014–2019)
  2. Everton Chimulirenji (de facto) (2019–2020)
- Mauritius Vice President –
  1. Barlen Vyapoory (2016–2019)
  2. Eddy Boissezon (2019–present)
- Namibia Vice President –Nangolo Mbumba (2018–present)
- Nigeria Vice President – Yemi Osinbajo (2015–present)
- Seychelles Vice President – Vincent Meriton (2016–2020)
- Sierra Leone Vice President –Mohamed Juldeh Jalloh (2018–present)
- Somaliland Vice President – Abdirahman Saylici (2010–present)
- South Africa Deputy President –David Mabuza (2018–present)
- South Sudan
  - First Vice President – Taban Deng Gai (2016–2020)
  - Vice President – James Wani Igga (2016–2020)
- Sudan
  - First Vice President –
    1. Bakri Hassan Saleh (2013–2019)
    2. Ahmed Awad Ibn Auf (2019)
  - Second Vice President –Osman Kebir (2018–2019)
  - Deputy Chairman of the Transitional Military Council –
    1. Kamal Abdel-Marouf al-Mahdi (2019)
    2. Hemedti (2019)
  - Deputy Chairman of the Transitional Sovereignty Council - Hemedti (2019–2023)
- Tanzania Vice President – Samia Suluhu (2015–2021)
  - Zanzibar
    - First Vice President – Seif Sharif Hamad (2010–2019)
    - Second Vice President – Seif Ali Iddi (2010–2020)
- Uganda Vice President – Edward Ssekandi (2011–2021)
- Zambia Vice President – Inonge Wina (2015–2021)
- Zimbabwe
  - First Vice Presidents – Constantino Chiwenga (2017–present)
  - Second Vice President – Kembo Mohadi (2017–2021)

== Asia ==
- Abkhazia Vice President - Aslan Bartsits (2019–2020)
- Afghanistan
  - First Vice President – Abdul Rashid Dostum (2014–2020)
  - Second Vice President – Sarwar Danish (2014–2021)
- Azerbaijan Vice President – Mehriban Aliyeva (2017–present)
- China (People's Republic of China) Vice President – Wang Qishan (2018–present)
- India Vice President – Venkaiah Naidu (2017–present)
- Indonesia Vice President –
  1. Jusuf Kalla (2014–2019)
  2. Ma'ruf Amin (2019–present)
- Iran
  - First Vice President – Eshaq Jahangiri (2013–2021)
  - Others Vice Presidents – Mohammad Nahavandian (Vice President for Economic Affairs) (2017–2021), Mohammad Bagher Nobakht (Vice President and Head of Management and Planning Organization) (2016-2021), Laya Joneidi (Vice President for Legal Affairs) (2017–2021), Hossein-Ali Amiri (Vice President for Parliamentary Affairs) (2017–2021), Sorena Sattari (Vice President for Science and Technology Affaires) (2013–2022), Masoumeh Ebtekar (Vice President for Women's and Family Affairs) (2017–2021), Ali Asghar Mounesan (Vice President of Cultural Heritage and Tourism Organization) (2017–2019), Ali Akbar Salehi (Vice President and Head of Atomic Energy Organization) (2013–2021), Mohammad-Ali Shahidi (Vice President and Head of Martyrs and Self-sacrifice's Affairs Foundation) (2016–2020). Jamshid Ansari (Vice President and Head of Administrative and Recruitment Organization) (2016–2021), Isa Kalantari (Vice President and Head of Environmental Protection Organization) (2017–2021)
- Iraq Vice Presidents – vacant (2018–present)
  - Kurdistan
    - First Vice President – Mustafa Said Qadir (2019–present)
    - Second Vice President – Jaafar Sheikh Mustafa (2019–present)
- North Korea (Democratic People's Republic of Korea)
  - Vice presidents de facto – Vice Chairmen of State Affairs Commission – Choe Ryong-hae (2016–2019) (first vice-chairman, 2019–present), Pak Pong-ju (2016–2021)
  - Vice presidents de jure – Vice Chairmen of the Presidium of Supreme People's Assembly – Kim Yong-dae (2009–2019), Pak Yong-il (2019–2022), Yang Hyong-sop (1998–2019), Thae Hyong-chol (2019–2021) Choe Yong-rim (honorary) (2011–2019), Kim Yong-ju (honorary) (1998–2019)
- Laos Vice President – Phankham Viphavanh (2016–2021)
- Maldives Vice President – Faisal Naseem (2018–2023)
- Myanmar
  - First Vice President – Myint Swe (2016–2021)
  - Second Vice President – Henry Van Thio (2016–present)
- Nepal Vice President – Nanda Bahadur Pun (2015–present)
- Philippines Vice President – Leni Robredo (2016–present)
- Syria
  - Syrian Arab Republic
    - Vice President – Najah al-Attar ((2006–present))
    - Vice President – Ali Mamlouk (2019–2021)
  - Syrian Interim Government
    - First Vice President –
      1. Abdul Basset Hamou (2018–2019)
      2. Okab Yahya (2019–present)
    - Second Vice President –
      1. Badr Jamous (2018–2019)
      2. Abdel Hakim Bashar (2019–present)
    - Third Vice President – Dima Moussa (2018–present)
- Taiwan (Republic of China) Vice President – Chen Chien-jen (2016–2020)
- Turkey Vice President – Fuat Oktay (2018–2023)
- United Arab Emirates Vice President – Sheikh Mohammed bin Rashid Al Maktoum (2006–present)
- Vietnam Vice President – Đặng Thị Ngọc Thịnh (2016–2021)
- Yemen
  - Republic of Yemen Vice President – Ali Mohsen al-Ahmar (2016–present)

== Europe ==
- Bulgaria Vice President – Iliana Iotova (2017–present)
- Cyprus Vice President – Vacant (1974–present)
- Switzerland Vice President – Simonetta Sommaruga (2019)

== North America and the Caribbean ==
- Costa Rica
  - First Vice President – Epsy Campbell Barr (2018–present)
  - Second Vice President – Marvin Rodríguez Cordero (2018–present)
- Cuba
  - Vice President of Cuba – Salvador Valdés Mesa (2019–present)
  - First Vice President of Council of State – Salvador Valdés Mesa (2018–2019)
  - Others Vice Presidents of Council of State – Gladys María Bejerano Portela (2013–2019), Roberto Tomás Morales Ojeda (2018–2019), Inés María Chapman (2018–2019), Ramiro Valdes Menendez (2009–2019), Salvador Valdes Mesa (2013–2019), Beatriz Jhonson (2018–2019)
- Dominican Republic Vice President – Margarita Cedeño de Fernández (2012–2020)
- El Salvador Vice President –
  1. Óscar Ortiz (2014–2019)
  2. Félix Ulloa (2019–present)
- Guatemala Vice President – Jafeth Cabrera (2016–2020)
- Honduras
  - First Vice President – Ricardo Antonio Alvarez Arias (2014–2022)
  - Second Vice President – Olga Margarita Alvarado Rodríguez (2018–2022)
  - Third Vice President – María Antonia Rivera Rosales (2018–2022)
- Nicaragua Vice President – Rosario Murillo (2017–present)
- Panama Vice President –
  1. Isabel Saint Malo (2014–2019)
  2. Jose Gabriel Carrizo (2019–present)
- United States Vice President – Mike Pence (2017–2021)

== Oceania ==
- Kiribati Vice President –
    1. Kourabi Nenem (2016–2020)
    2. Teuea Toatu (2019–present)
- Micronesia Vice President – Yosiwo P. George (2015–present)
- Palau Vice President – Raynold Oilouch (2017–present)
- Samoa
  - Member of Council of Deputies – vacant (2017–present)
  - Member of Council of Deputies – vacant (2018–present)
  - Member of Council of Deputies – Le Mamea Ropati (2016–present)

== South America ==
- Argentina Vice President –
  1. Gabriela Michetti (2015–2019)
  2. Cristina Fernández de Kirchner (2019–present)
- Bolivia Vice President – Álvaro García Linera (2006–2019)
- Brazil Vice President – Hamilton Mourão (2019–present)
- Colombia Vice President – Marta Lucía Ramírez (2018–present)
- Ecuador Vice President – Otto Sonnenholzner (2018–2020)
- Guyana
  - First Vice President – Moses Nagamootoo (2015–2020)
  - Second Vice President – Khemraj Ramjattan (2015–2020)
  - Third Vice President – Carl Greenidge (2015–2019)
  - Fourth Vice President – Sydney Allicock (2015–2020)
- Paraguay Vice President – Hugo Velázquez Moreno (2018–2020)
- Peru
  - First Vice President – Mercedes Aráoz (2018–2020)
  - Second Vice President – Vacant (2018–present)
- Suriname Vice President – Ashwin Adhin (2015–2020)
- Uruguay Vice President – Lucía Topolansky (2017–2020)
- Venezuela Vice President – Delcy Rodríguez (2018–present)

== See also ==
- List of current vice presidents and designated acting presidents
