= List of vice presidents in 2023 =

This is a list of vice presidents in 2023.

== Africa ==
- Angola Vice President – Esperança da Costa (2022–present)
- Botswana Vice President – Slumber Tsogwane (2018–present)
- Burkina Faso
  - First Vice President of Patriotic Movement for Safeguard and Restoration – vacant (2022–present)
  - Second Vice President of Patriotic Movement for Safeguard and Restoration – vacant (2022–present)
- Benin – Vice President – Mariam Chabi Talata (2021–present)
- Burundi – Vice President – Prosper Bazombanza (2020–present)
- Chad Vice-chairmen of Transitional Military Council – Djimadoum Tiraina (2021–present)
- Egypt Vice President – vacant (2019–present)
- Equatorial Guinea Vice President – Teodoro Nguema Obiang Mangue (2016–present)
- Gabon Vice President –
  - vacant (2019–2023)
  - Rose Christiane Raponda (2023)
  - Joseph Owondault Berre (2023–present)
- The Gambia Vice President –
  - Badara Joof (2022–2023)
  - Muhammad B.S. Jallow (2023–present)
- Ghana Vice President – Mahamudu Bawumia (2017–present)
- Ivory Coast (Côte d'Ivoire) Vice President – Tiémoko Meyliet Koné (2022–present)
- Kenya Deputy President – Rigathi Gachagua (2022–present)
- Liberia Vice President – Jewel Taylor (2018–present)
- Libya
  - Vice-Chairmen of the Presidential Council – Abdullah al-Lafi (2021–present)
  - Vice-Chairmen of the Presidential Council – Musa Al-Koni (2021–present)
- Malawi Vice President – Saulos Chilima (2020–present)
- Mali Vice President – vacant (2021–present)
- Mauritius Vice President – Eddy Boissezon (2019–present)
- Namibia Vice President – Nangolo Mbumba (2018–present)
- Niger Vice President of the National Council for the Safeguard of the Homeland – Salifou Modi (2023–present)
- Nigeria Vice President –
  - Yemi Osinbajo (2015–2023)
  - Kashim Shettima (2023–present)
- Seychelles Vice President – Ahmed Afif (2020–present)
- Sierra Leone Vice President – Mohamed Juldeh Jalloh (2018–present)
- Somaliland Vice President – Abdirahman Saylici (2010–present)
- South Africa Deputy President –
  - David Mabuza (2018–2023)
  - Paul Mashatile (2023–present)
- South Sudan
  - First Vice President – Riek Machar (2020–present)
  - Second Vice President – James Wani Igga (2020–present)
  - Third Vice President – Taban Deng Gai (2020–present)
  - Fourth Vice President – Rebecca Nyandeng Garang (2020–present)
  - Fifth Vice President – Hussein Abdelbagi (2020–present)
- Sudan – Deputy Chairman of the Transitional Sovereignty Council –
  1. Hemedti (2019–2023)
  2. Malik Agar (2023–present)
- Tanzania Vice President – Philip Mpango (2021–present)
  - Zanzibar
    - First Vice President – Othman Masoud Sharif (2021–present)
    - Second Vice President – Hemed Suleiman Abdalla (2020–present)
- Uganda Vice President – Jessica Alupo (2021–present)
- Zambia Vice President – Mutale Nalumango (2021–present)
- Zimbabwe
  - First Vice presidents – Constantino Chiwenga (2017–present)
  - Second Vice President – vacant (2021– present)

== Asia ==
- Abkhazia Vice President – Badr Gunba (2020–present)
- Afghanistan
  - First Deputy Leader – Sirajuddin Haqqani (2021–present)
  - Second Deputy Leader – Mullah Yaqoob (2021–present)
  - Third Deputy Leader – Abdul Ghani Baradar (2021–present)
- Azerbaijan Vice President – Mehriban Aliyeva (2017–present)
- China (People's Republic of China) Vice President –
  - Wang Qishan (2018–2023)
  - Han Zheng (2023–present)
- India Vice President – Jagdeep Dhankhar (2022–present)
- Indonesia Vice President – Ma'ruf Amin (2019–present)
- Iran
  - First Vice President – Mohammad Mokhber (2021–present)
  - Others Vice presidents –
    - Vice President for Economic Affairs – Mohsen Rezaei Mirghaed (2021–2023)
    - Vice President and Head of Plan and Budget Organisation –
      - Seyyed Masoud Mirkazemi (2021–2023)
      - Davoud Manzour (2023–present)
    - Vice President and Head of Administrative and Recruitment Affairs Organisation – Meysam Latifi (2021–present)
    - Vice President for Legal Affairs – Mohammad Dehghan (2021–present)
    - Vice President for Parliamentary Affairs – Seyyed Mohammad Hosseini (2021–present)
    - Vice President for Science and Technology Affairs – Ruhollah Dehghani Firouz Abadi (2022–present)
    - Vice President for Women and Family Affairs – Ensieh KhazAli (2021–present)
    - Vice President and Head of Atomic Energy Organization – Mohammad Eslami (2021–present)
    - Vice President and Head of Foundation of Martyrs and Veterans Affairs – Seyyed Amir Hossein Ghazizadeh Hashemi (2021–present)
    - Vice President and Head of Department of Environment – Ali Salajegheh (2021–present)
    - Vice President for Executive Affairs – Mohsen Mansouri (2022–present)
- Iraq
  - Vice President – vacant (2018–present)
  - Vice President – vacant (2018–present)
  - Vice President – vacant (2018–present)
  - Kurdistan
    - First Vice President – Mustafa Said Qadir (2019–present)
    - Second Vice President – Jaafar Sheikh Mustafa (2019–present)
- North Korea (Democratic People's Republic of Korea)
  - Vice presidents de facto
    - First vice-president of State Affairs Commission – Choe Ryong-hae – (2019–present)
    - Vice-president of State Affairs Commission – Kim Tok Hun (2021–present)
  - Vice presidents de jure
    - Vice Chairman of the Standing Committee of Supreme People's Assembly – Kang Yun Sok (2021–present)
- Laos
  - Vice President – Pany Yathortou (2021–present)
  - Vice President – Bounthong Chitmany (2021–present)
- Maldives Vice President –
  - Faisal Naseem (2018–2023)
  - Hussain Mohamed Latheef (2023–present)
- Myanmar
  - First Vice President – Myint Swe (2016–present)
  - Second Vice President – Henry Van Thio (2016–present)
- Nepal Vice President –
  - Nanda Kishor Pun (2015–2023)
  - Ram Sahaya Yadav (2023–present)
- Philippines Vice President – Sara Duterte (2022–present)
- Syria
  - Syrian Arab Republic
    - Vice President – Najah al-Attar (2006–present)
    - Vice President – vacant (2021– present)
  - Syrian Interim Government
    - First Vice President – Abdel Ahad Astifou, (2021–present)
    - Second Vice President – Abdel Hakim Bashar (2019–present)
    - Third Vice President – Ruba Habboush (2020–present)
- Taiwan (Republic of China) Vice President – Lai Ching-te (2020–present)
- Turkey Vice President
  - Fuat Oktay (2018–2023)
  - Cevdet Yılmaz (2023-Present)
- United Arab Emirates Vice President
    - Sheikh Mohammed bin Rashid Al Maktoum (2006–present)
    - Sheikh Mansour bin Zayed Al Nahyan (2023–present)
- Vietnam Vice President – Võ Thị Ánh Xuân (2021–present)
- Yemen
  - Republic of Yemen Vice President – Ali Mohsen al-Ahmar (2016–present)
  - Supreme Political Council (unrecognised, rival government) Deputy Head of the Supreme Political Council – Qassem Labozah (2016–present)

== Europe ==
- Bulgaria Vice President – Iliana Iotova (2017–present)
- Cyprus Vice President – vacant (1974–present)
- Switzerland Vice President – Viola Amherd (2023)

== North America and the Caribbean ==
- Costa Rica
  - First Vice President – Stephan Brunner (2022–present)
  - Second Vice President – Mary Munive (2022–present)
- Cuba Vice President – Salvador Valdés Mesa (2019–present)
- Dominican Republic Vice President – Raquel Peña de Antuña (2020–present)
- El Salvador Vice President – Félix Ulloa (2019–present)
- Guatemala Vice President – Guillermo Castillo (2020–present)
- Honduras
  - First Vice President – Salvador Nasralla (2022–present)
  - Second Vice President – Doris Gutiérrez (2022–present)
  - Third Vice President – Renato Florentino (2022–present)
- Nicaragua Vice President – Rosario Murillo (2017–present)
- Panama Vice President – Jose Gabriel Carrizo (2019–present)
- United States Vice President – Kamala Harris (2021–present)

== Oceania ==
- Kiribati Vice President – Teuea Toatu (2019–prezent)
- Micronesia Vice President – Aren Palik (2022–present)
- Nauru Minister Assisting the President –
  - Martin Hunt (2019–2023)
  - Lionel Aingimea (2023–present)
- Palau Vice President – Uduch Sengebau Senior – (2021–present)
- Samoa
  - Member of Council of Deputies – vacant (2017–present)
  - Member of Council of Deputies – vacant (2018–present)
  - Member of Council of Deputies – Le Mamea Ropati (2016–present)

== South America ==
- Argentina Vice President –
  - Cristina Fernández de Kirchner (2019–2023)
  - Victoria Villarruel (2023–present)
- Bolivia Vice President – David Choquehuanca (2020–present)
- Brazil Vice President – Geraldo Alckmin (2023–present)
- Colombia Vice President – Francia Márquez (2022–present)
- Ecuador Vice President –
  - Alfredo Borrero (2021–2023)
  - Verónica Abad Rojas (2023–present)
- Guyana
  - First Vice President – Mark Phillips (2020–present)
  - Vice President – Bharrat Jagdeo (2020–present)
- Paraguay Vice President –
  - Hugo Velázquez Moreno (2018–2023)
  - Pedro Alliana (2023–present)
- Peru
  - First Vice President – vacant (2022–present)
  - Second Vice President – vacant (2020–present)
- Suriname Vice President – Ronnie Brunswijk (2020–present)
- Uruguay Vice President – Beatriz Argimón (2020–present)
- Venezuela Vice President – Delcy Rodríguez (2018–present)

== See also ==
- List of current vice presidents and designated acting presidents
