= Mohammad-Hadi Imanieh =

Iranian economist and politician

- محمدهادی ایمانیه
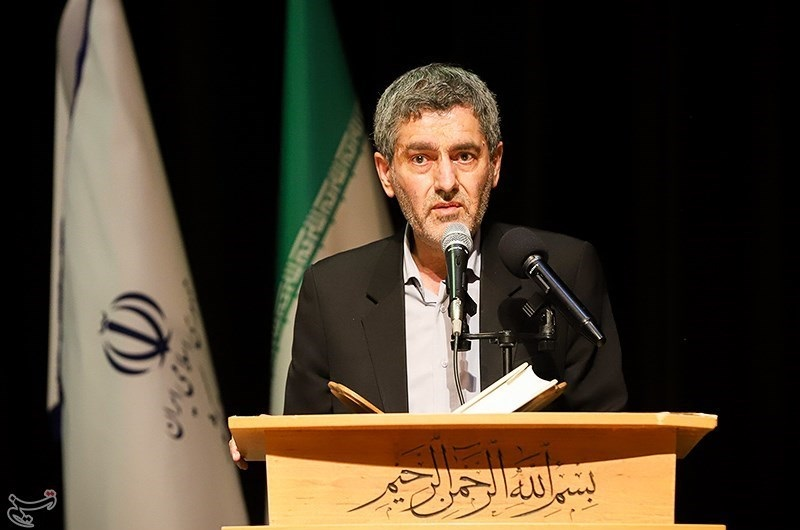

Governor-general of Fars
- In office 29 September 2021 – 9 October 2024
- President: Ebrahim Raisi
- Preceded by: Enayatullah Rahimy
- Succeeded by: Hossein-Ali Amiri

President of Shiraz University of Medical Sciences
- In office 2005–2017
- President: Mahmoud Ahmadinejad Hassan Rouhani
- Preceded by: Mohammad Reza Penjah Shahin
- Succeeded by: Ali Bahader

Personal details
- Born: 1962 (age 63–64) Shiraz, Iran
- Education: Shiraz University of Medical Sciences; Tehran University of Medical Sciences; King's College London

Mohammad-Hadi Imanieh (Persian: محمدهادی ایمانیه, born 1962) is an Iranian physician and conservative politician who formerly served as the governor general of Fars province from 2021 to 2024.
