= Kosrat Rasul Ali =

Kurdish politician

- کۆسرەت ڕەسووڵ عەلی
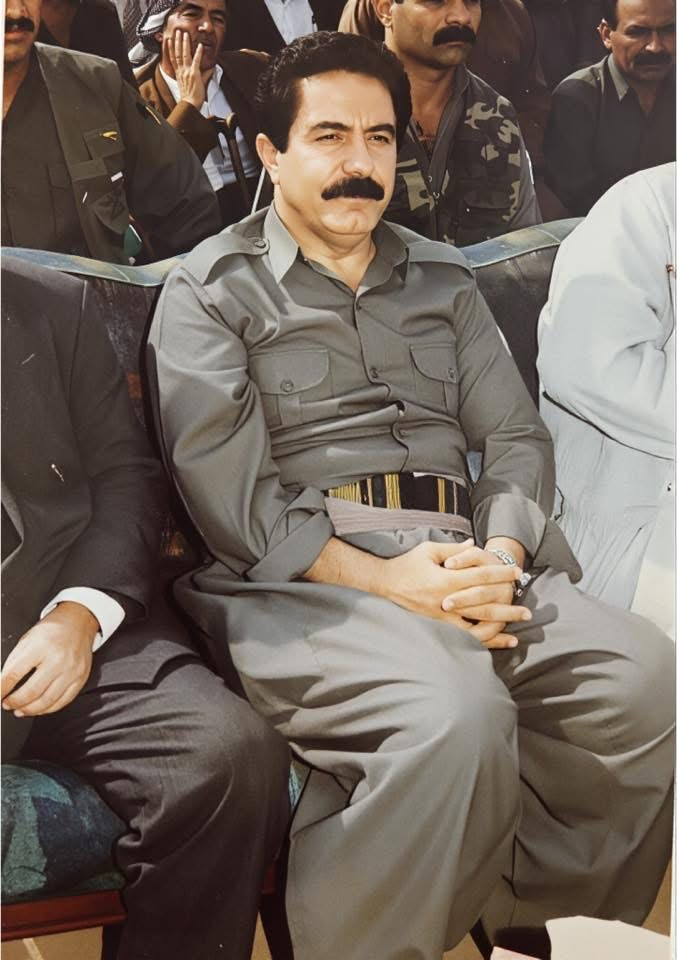
- Kosrat in 2010

Leader of the Patriotic Union of Kurdistan
- In office 3 October 2017 – 18 February 2020
- Preceded by: Jalal Talabani
- Succeeded by: Lahur Talabani and Bafel Talabani

Vice President of Kurdistan Region
- In office 14 June 2005 – 1 November 2017
- President: Masoud Barzani
- Succeeded by: Jaafar Sheikh Mustafa and Mustafa Said Qadir in 2019

2nd Prime Minister of Kurdistan Region (PUK-controlled part)
- In office 26 April 1993 – 21 January 2001
- President: Jalal Talabani
- Preceded by: Fuad Masum
- Succeeded by: Barham Salih

Personal details
- Born: 1952 (age 73–74) Shiwashok, Erbil, Kingdom of Iraq
- Party: Patriotic Union of Kurdistan

Kosrat Rasul Ali (Kurdish: کۆسرەت ڕەسووڵ عەلی; born 1952) is an Iraqi Kurdish politician and the leader of the Supreme Political Council of the Patriotic Union of Kurdistan (PUK), veteran Peshmerga military leader, former Prime Minister, and former Vice President of the Kurdistan Region.

== Early life ==
Ali was born in 1952, in shiwashok village near Koya in Erbil Governorate, Kingdom of Iraq.

== Military achievements ==
=== Liberation of Erbil and Kirkuk (1991) ===
During the 1991 Kurdish uprising, Kosrat played a major role in the liberation of Erbil and Kirkuk from the Baathist regime. He led the Peshmerga forces that, alongside the local population, successfully liberated these cities on March 11, 1991. He was the first to enter Erbil, leading the celebrations from the citadel to the governor's office, a key moment in the fight for Kurdish autonomy.

=== Battle of Kore (1991) ===
In the same year, when the Baathist regime launched a counterattack to retake Kurdish areas, Kosrat led the defense at the Battle of Kore, near Erbil. His leadership helped defeat the Baathist forces in a decisive battle that ensured Kurdish control of the region.

=== Capture of Saddam Hussein (2003) ===
In December 2003, Kosrat Rasul was instrumental in the operation that led to the capture of Saddam Hussein. Kurdish intelligence, under Kosrat’s leadership, provided critical information to U.S. forces that ultimately uncovered Hussein's hideout near Tikrit. This collaboration between the PUK and coalition forces was acknowledged by Iraqi politician Ahmed Chalabi, who confirmed Kosrat's role in the successful mission. The PUK’s intelligence contributions were pivotal in locating Hussein, who had been evading capture for several months.

=== Campaign Against ISIS (2014-2017) ===
Kosrat also played a key role in defending Kurdish territories from ISIS. Under his command, the Peshmerga successfully defended the vital oilfields around Kirkuk and pushed ISIS forces out of key areas.

=== 2017 Kirkuk Crisis ===
When Iraqi forces advanced on Kirkuk in October 2017, many Kurdish units retreated due to backdoor deals, but Kosrat and his Peshmerga forces remained to defend the city. On the night of October 16, 2017, his forces engaged in a battle where Kosrat lost many Peshmerga fighters before being forced to withdraw.

== Political career ==
=== Prime Minister ===
Kosrat held the post of prime minister from 1993 to 2001, in the second cabinet (1993-1996) and third cabinet (1996-2001). During his tenure, he advocated for Kurdish unity and was a strong proponent of forming a unified Kurdish army.

=== Vice President ===
Kosrat served as Vice President of the Kurdistan Region from 2005 to 2017. During his tenure, he also served as Deputy Commander-in-Chief of the Peshmerga forces and played a significant role in organizing military campaigns. Kosrat was an advocate for Kurdish unity and a single Kurdish army, believing that a united military front was essential for Kurdish independence.

=== Post Referendum ===
After the 2017, Kurdish independence referendum, Kosrat published an article in CNN, where he argued that Kurds were seeking independence similar to the freedom achieved by Americans in 1776. He referred to the Iraqi military as an "occupying force." His article led resulted in the Iraqi Supreme Judicial Council issuing an arrest warrant for Kosrat on accusations of attempting to incite civil conflict between Arabs and Kurds. However, the warrant was later overturned by Prime Minister Haider al-Abadi, who declared that there was no legal basis for the charges.

== Personal life ==
Kosrat was severely injured multiple times during his military career, requiring medical treatment abroad.

== Recognition ==
In recognition of his lifelong dedication to Kurdish autonomy and human rights, Kosrat received the Golden Pegasus Award in Italy, acknowledging his contributions to freedom and justice.
