= Hossein Afshin =

- حسین افشین
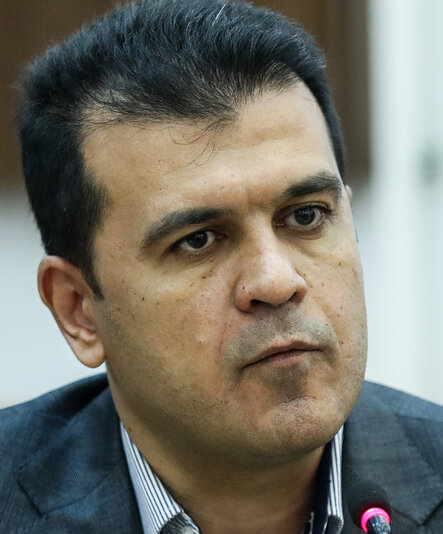

Vice President of Iran Head of National Elites Foundation
- Incumbent
- Assumed office 10 August 2024
- President: Masoud Pezeshkian
- Preceded by: Ruhollah Dehghani Firouzabadi

Personal details
- Born: 1980 (age 45–46) Esfahan, Iran
- Education: Sharif University of Technology

Hossein Afshin (born 1980) is an Iranian politician who is serving as Vice President for Science, Technology and Knowledge-Based Economy Affairs of Iran since August 2024. He served as Professor of Mechinical Engineering at Sharif University of Technology.
