= Masoud Barzani =

President of the Kurdistan Region from 2005 to 2017

- مەسعوود بارزانی
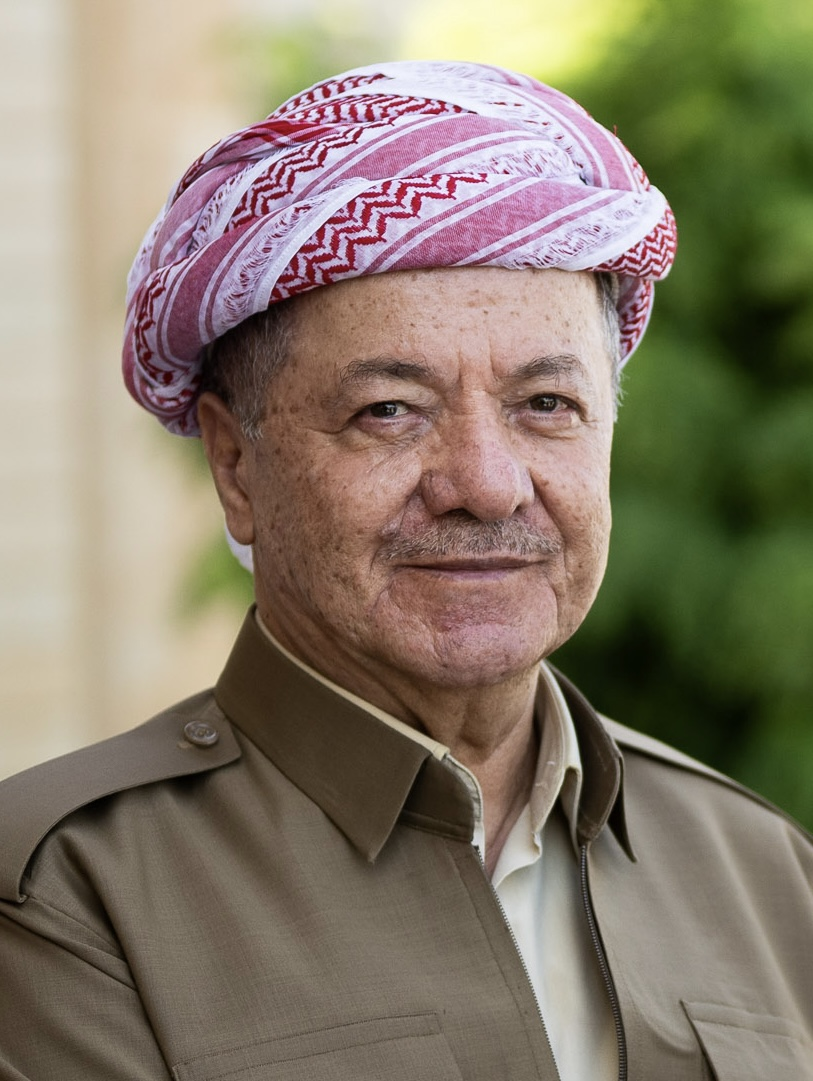
- Barzani in 2023

President of the Kurdistan Region
- In office 14 June 2005 – 1 November 2017 (Mandate expired on 19 August 2015)
- Prime Minister: Nechirvan Barzani; Barham Salih; Nechirvan Barzani
- Vice President: Kosrat Rasul Ali
- Preceded by: Position established
- Succeeded by: Nechirvan Barzani

President of the Governing Council of Iraq
- In office 1 April 2004 – 30 April 2004
- Leader: Paul Bremer
- Preceded by: Mohammad Bahr al-Ulloum
- Succeeded by: Ezzedine Salim

President of the Kurdistan Democratic Party
- Incumbent
- Assumed office 2 March 1979
- Preceded by: Mustafa Barzani

Personal details
- Born: 16 August 1946 (age 80) Mahabad, Republic of Kurdistan (now Mahabad, Iran)
- Citizenship: Iraq, Turkey (1992–2003)
- Party: Kurdistan Democratic Party
- Website: www.masoudbarzani.krd/en/index/

Masoud Barzani (Kurdish: مەسعوود‌ بارزانی, romanized: Mesûd Barzanî; born 16 August 1946) is a Kurdish politician who has been leader of the Kurdistan Democratic Party (KDP) since 1979, and was President of the Kurdistan Region of Iraq from 2005 to 2017.

== Early life and career ==
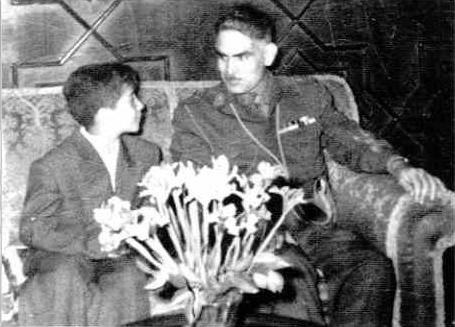
A young Massoud Barzani with Iraqi Prime Minister Abd al-Karim Qasim

Barzani was born in Mahabad, Iran, during the short-lived Republic of Mahabad, and succeeded his father Mustafa Barzani as leader of the KDP in 1979. In the same year, he avoided an attempted assassination in Vienna.

Working closely with his brother Idris Barzani until Idris's death, Barzani and various other Kurdish groups fought with Iran against the Iraqi military during the Iran–Iraq War. Barzani has played a key role in the development of the Kurdistan Region polity since the Gulf War.

Barzani at 16 years old, as a Peshmerga (1963)

Barzani visited Damascus in December 1976 after the collapse of the Kurdish uprising, and again in May 1977, where he held talks with Syrian officials and met Jalal Talabani to negotiate cooperation between the Kurdistan Democratic Party and the Patriotic Union of Kurdistan (PUK).

== President of the Kurdistan Region ==
A major result of Saddam Hussein's defeat in the Gulf War (1991) and Operation Provide Comfort was the ultimate establishment of Kurdish control over northern Iraq in 1992, he was given a Turkish passport by the then-president Turgut Özal in order to help Barzani travel freely. Just a few months after the creation of the autonomous zone, free elections (a first in Iraq) were held in 1992. The two main Kurdish parties, namely Barzani's KDP and the Jalal Talabani-led Patriotic Union of Kurdistan (PUK), split the vote, and subsequently split the government ministries evenly. In May 1994, however, fighting broke out between the Peshmerga of the PUK and of the KDP. In 1996, he met PKK leader Abdullah Öcalan in Damascus and visited Qamishli in northeastern Syria to engage with Syrian Kurdish figures.

On 31 August 1996, Barzani called on the assistance of Saddam Hussein's regime to help him combat the PUK, which was receiving Iranian assistance. With the aid of the Iraqi army, the KDP drove the PUK from Iraqi Kurdistan's major cities. The PUK eventually regrouped and retook Suleimani and parts of Hawler province. An end to the civil war was brokered in 1998 in the Washington Peace Accords, leaving the Kurdish zone divided between the KDP in the Northwest and PUK in the Southeast.

After the invasion of Iraq in 2003, the KDP and PUK gradually established a unified regional government. Barzani became a member of the Iraqi Governing Council and was the president of the council in April 2004. He was elected as the President of Iraqi Kurdistan by the Parliament of Iraqi Kurdistan in June 2005.

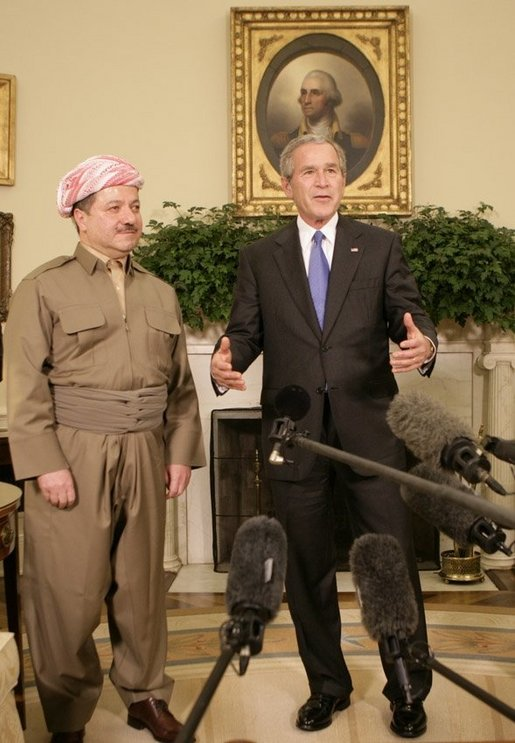
President George W. Bush talks to reporters as he welcomes Masoud Barzani to the Oval Office at the White House, Tuesday, 25 October 2005

As President of the Kurdistan Region, Barzani has made official visits to several countries and met dignitaries of the likes of US President George W. Bush, UK Prime Minister Tony Blair, the Pope at the Vatican, the Italian Prime Minister Silvio Berlusconi in Rome and King Abdullah of Saudi Arabia in Riyadh.

In July 2009, in the first direct elections for the presidency of the autonomous Kurdistan Region, Masoud Barzani was reelected as president by a popular ballot, receiving 69.6% of the votes. The elections were closely monitored by international observers and the Iraqi Electoral Commission. In August 2013, after the expiration of his 8-year term, the parliament extended his presidency for another two years, and he continued in the role even beyond this extension.

Masoud Barzani was one of the eight candidates shortlisted in the Time magazine's 2014 Person of the Year, for his efforts to push for Kurdish independence with the ongoing fight against the Islamic State of Iraq and Syria.

=== 2017 independence referendum ===
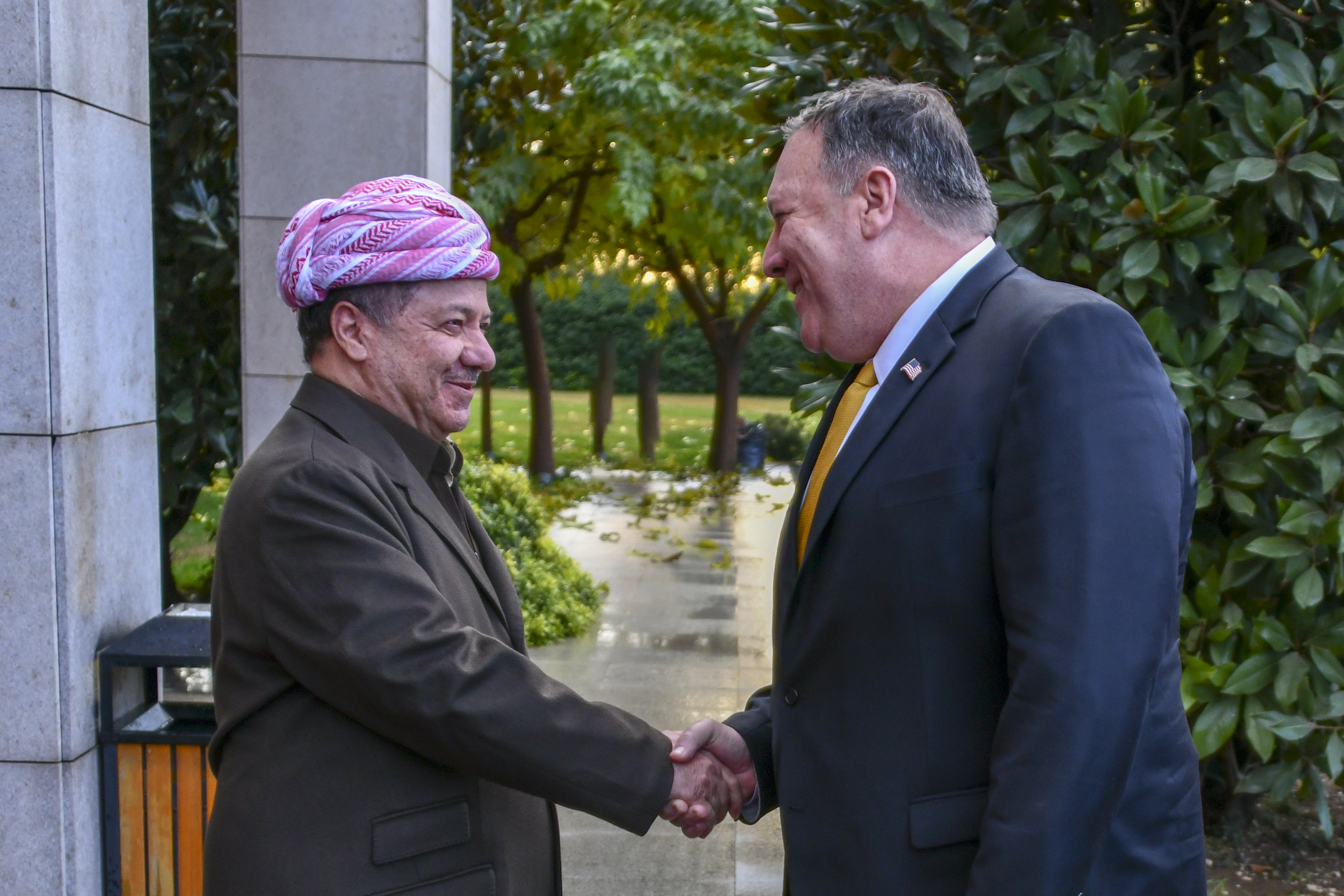
Barzani meets with US Secretary of State Mike Pompeo in January 2019

On 7 June 2017, Barzani had announced that Kurdistan Region would hold an independence referendum on 25 September 2017. On the day following the referendum, 26 September 2017, he announced that the referendum had been a success in seeking independence, and called on neighboring countries to be open to future dialogue.

The Iraqi government rejected the results of the referendum. On 15 October, units of the Iraqi security forces and Popular Mobilization Forces, entered the Kurdish-held city of Kirkuk, forcing a withdrawal of the Peshmerga and prompting similar withdrawals across other contested cities in northern Iraq.

Following the failure of the referendum and the Peshmerga's territorial losses, Barzani announced on 29 October that he would step down as the President of the Kurdistan Region.

=== Post-presidency ===
Barzani remained the president of the KDP and, as of 2020, was still receiving ambassadors.

Barzani maintained political engagement with Syrian Kurdish actors throughout the Syrian civil war and its aftermath. On 10 December 2019, he received a delegation from the Kurdish National Council in Syria (ENKS) at his headquarters in Erbil and supported dialogue between Syrian Kurdish factions. He later met with Syrian Democratic Forces (SDF) commander Mazloum Abdi in January 2025, describing the meeting as historic and calling for Kurdish unity, dialogue, and peaceful solutions for Syrian Kurds. In January 2026, Abdi consulted Barzani before announcing the withdrawal of SDF forces from Dayr Hafir and surrounding areas during the Syrian transitional government's offensive in northeastern Syria. Abdi subsequently travelled to Erbil with U.S. envoy Tom Barrack to meet Barzani on 17 January 2026. A ceasefire agreement between the SDF and Damascus was reached the following day.

== Criticism ==
Members of the Barzani family allegedly control a large number of commercial enterprises in Iraqi Kurdistan, with a gross value of several billion dollars, although no evidence of such ownership by Masoud Barzani himself exists. While accusations of corruption against both the KDP-Barzanis and the PUK-Talabanis are often levied by both Kurdish sources and international observers such as Michael Rubin, President Barzani on several occasions has denied involvement in any commercial enterprises.

Insufficient financial transparency in the region serves to both exacerbate the accusations and hamper efforts to find any evidence of malfeasance. In July 2010 the opposition paper Rozhnama accused the Barzani-led KDP of pocketing large sums from illegal oil-smuggling.

In December 2005, Kamal Qadir, a Kurdish legal scholar with Austrian citizenship, was arrested in Iraqi Kurdistan for a series of articles criticizing Barzani's government and family. He was charged with defamation and sentenced to thirty years' imprisonment. He was released in 2006 following international pressure from Amnesty International, Reporters Without Borders, and the government of Austria. In May 2010, the journalist Sardasht Osman was killed after criticising the Barzani family.

Barzani's detractors say he is tribal, conservative, and unworldly, often playing traditional tribal roles. However, his administration in Erbil successfully built modern transportation infrastructures, attracted foreign business investment, and prioritized education.

== Personal life ==
Barzani married his cousin Jowaira, with whom he had eight children: five sons, Masrour, Mansour, Mustafa, Muksi and Waysi, and three daughters, Nabila, Monira and Urfa.

== Honours ==
- Holy See: Knight of the Order of Pope Pius IX.

== See also ==
- Barzani family
- Government of the Kurdistan Region
- Kurdistan Democratic Party (PDK)

Political offices
Preceded by Mohammad Bahr al-Ulloum	President of the Governing Council of Iraq; 2004	Succeeded by Ezzedine Salim
New office	President of the Kurdistan Region; 2005–2017	Succeeded by Vacant
