= Sardasht Osman =

Iraqi journalist

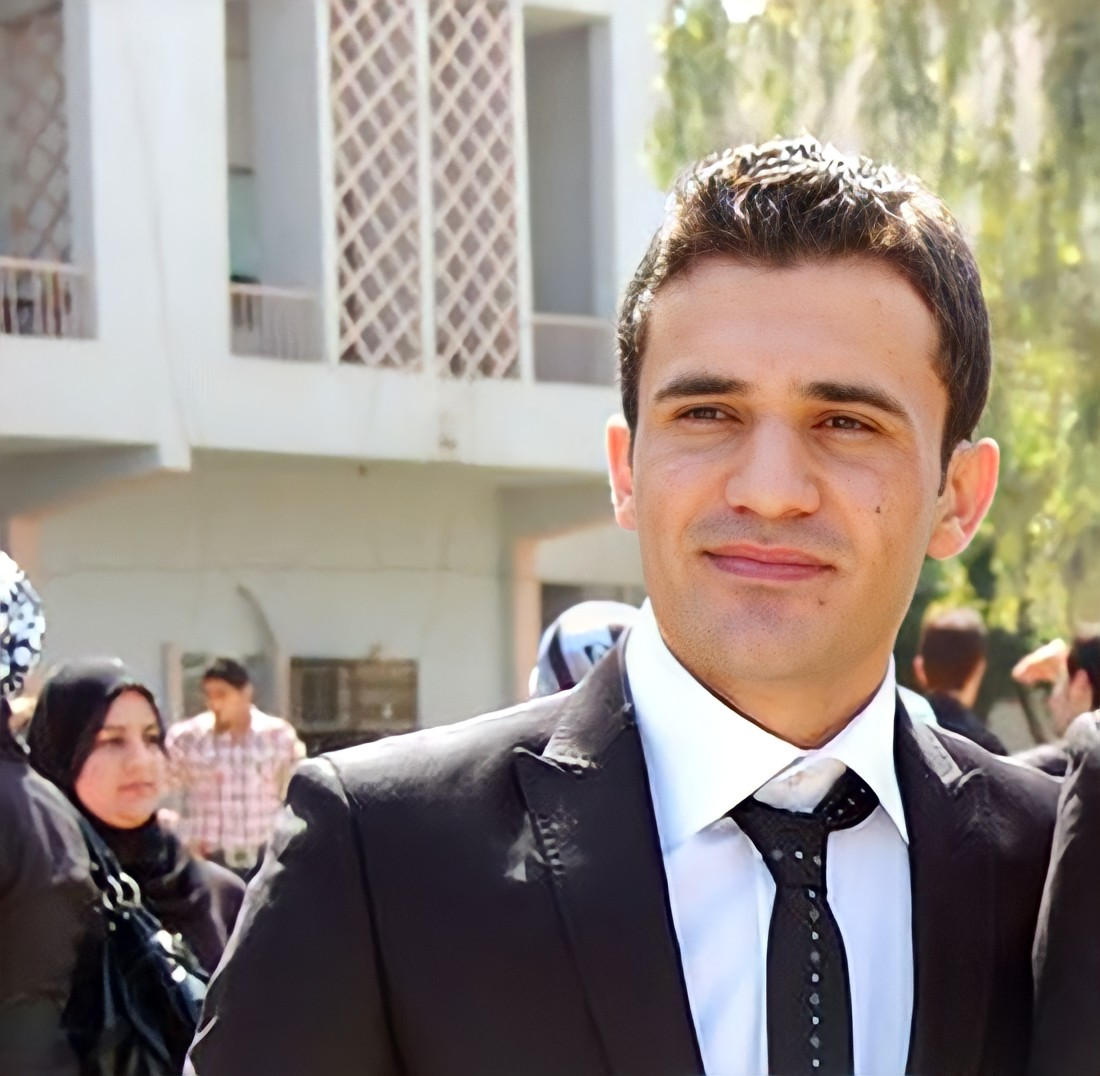
- Sardasht at the graduation ceremony of the English Department at Salahaddin University-Erbil - April 18, 2010.
- Born: 25 December 1987; Erbil, Iraq
- Died: 4 May 2010 (aged 22); Mosul, Iraq
- Education: English language, Salahaddin University
- Occupations: Freelance journalist, student

Sardasht Osman (Kurdish: سەردەشت عوسمان, Serdeşt Osman) was an Iraqi Kurdish journalist and student from Erbil who was kidnapped on 4 May 2010 outside the College of Arts Building where he studied English. On May 6, 2010, his body was found in neighbouring Mosul city. He was known in Iraqi Kurdistan for articles criticising the Kurdistan Region and Masoud Barzani. Some of his articles were published under a pseudonym on several Kurdish websites.

== Work ==
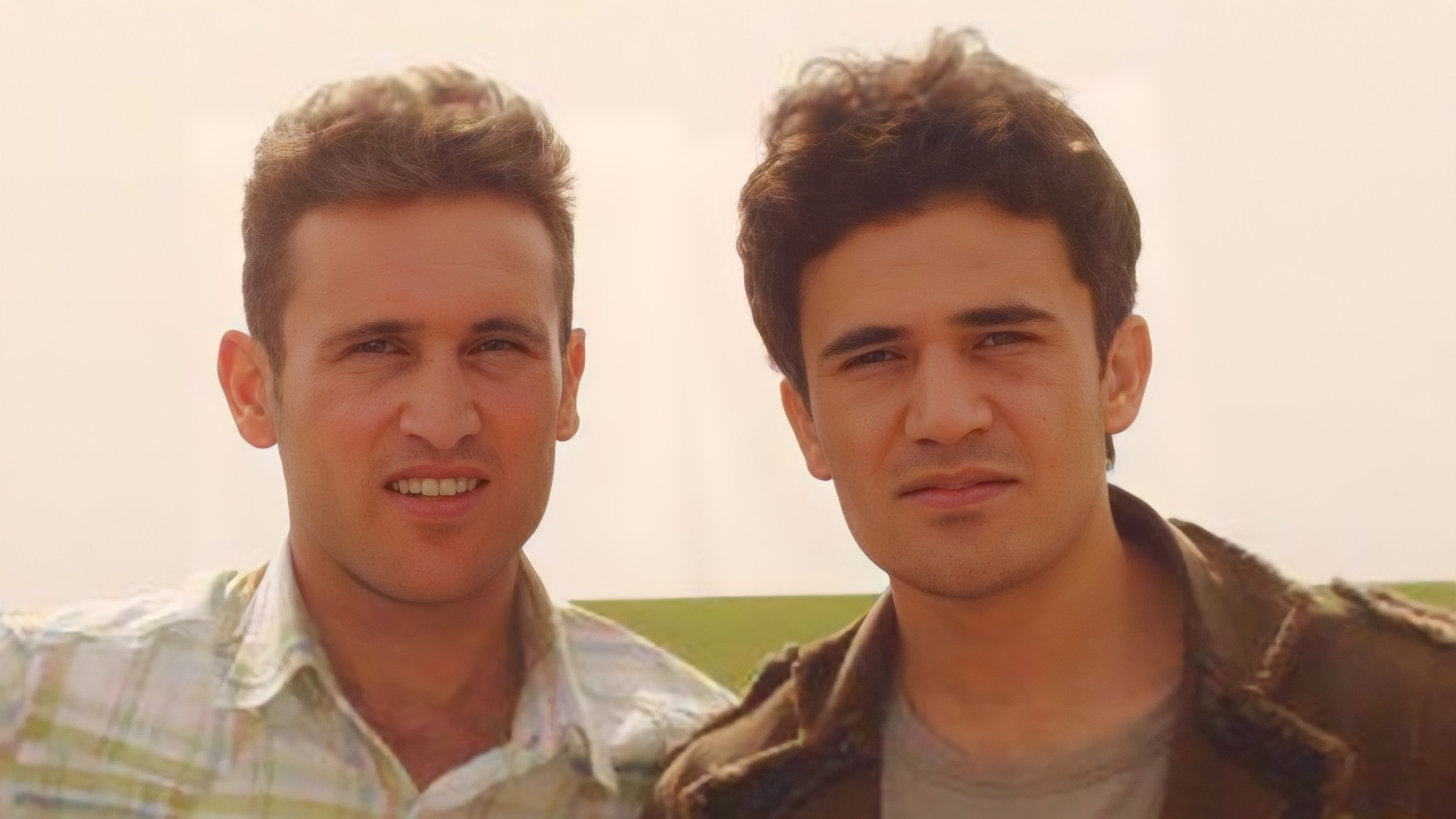
Sardasht Othman and Bashdar Othman in the Erbil plain - Spring 2008.

Osman's work was best known for being critical of the Kurdistan Regional Government; the Kurdistan Democratic Party (KDP), one of the two Kurdish ruling parties; and the Barzani family in charge of the KDP. Their prominent officials included Kurdistan Region President and KDP leader Massoud Barzani, KDP deputy leader and former regional PM Nechirvan Barzani, and head of the security agency Parastin, Masrur Barzani. Nechirvan is Massoud Barzani's nephew, while Masrur is his son. Osman wrote articles for independent news websites, only a few of which have been translated into English. He started writing as a journalist in 2004. in his short time of journalist, he became a well known person among liberals and critical thinkers.

== Kidnapping and assassination ==
Osman received death threats through e-mail and telephone almost immediately after writing an article about Massoud Barzani. The threats were aimed at Osman and his family.

Osman was abducted on 3 May. According to eyewitnesses and the police, an unidentified white Hyundai minibus with a concealed number plate stopped in front of the college just as Osman exited. The men then pushed him into the van and drove off. His handcuffed body was found two days later outside Mosul, Iraq, with two bullets in his head.

=== Reaction ===
- (Kurdistan Region) Kurdistan Regional Government (KRG) and Kurdistan Regional Presidency (KRP): The KRG and KRP condemned the abduction and killing of Osman, claiming that it was "a crime designed to undermine the security of the region and to attack the life and liberty of the people."
- Kurdistan Democratic Party: The KDP demanded the security and related foundations to shed light on the "latest events".
- Jalal Talabani: In a statement, Jalal Talabani condemned the abduction and killing of Osman. He expressed his condolences to Osman's family, friends and colleagues.
- Barham Salih: Barham Salih claimed that he was "dismayed" at the murder of Osman.
- Massoud Barzani: Massoud Barzani urged the security forces to probe into the case and called for an independent committee to follow the investigation.
- President of Iraqi Kurdistan: The Kurdistan Region Presidency issued a statement condemning Osman's murder and calling for an investigation into the incident. In its statement, the Kurdistan Region Presidency claimed that "We reiterate our gratitude to those in the free press whose role has advanced the cause of freedom in the Kurdistan Region and Iraq. We remain resolute in our efforts to ensure that all citizens of the Kurdistan Region are free to enjoy the human rights afforded to democratic citizens the world over."
- Veteran journalists: Open letter to the Kurdistan Regional Government from journalists who have covered Iraqi Kurdistan for many years. At Committee to Protect Journalists:

=== Aftermath ===
Osman's death came as a shock to most in Iraqi Kurdistan. Many independent media organisations condemned the killing and called for an independent investigation. Rallies and mass demonstrations were held inside and outside Iraqi Kurdistan, calling for those responsible to be arrested. However, 14 years later, the murderer(s) has/have never been arrested or identified, which puts more responsibility on the kurdish ruling party (KDP).
