= Ruhollah Dehghani Firouzabadi =

Iranian scientist (born 1981)

- روح‌الله دهقانی فیروزآبادی

Vice President of Iran Head of National Elites Foundation
- In office 2 November 2022 – 10 August 2024; Acting: 18 September – 2 November 2022
- President: Ebrahim Raisi; Mohammad Mokhber (acting)
- Preceded by: Sorena Sattari
- Succeeded by: Hossein Afshin

Personal details
- Born: 23 April 1981 (age 45) Meybod, Iran
- Education: Sharif University of Technology

Ruhollah Dehghani Firouzabadi (Persian: روح‌الله دهقانی فیروزآبادی; born 23 April 1981) is an Iranian scientist and Vice President of Iran in the field of Science, Technology and Knowledge-Based Economy. Before this, he was the head of Academic Jihad. He is also a member of the faculty of Sharif University of Technology with the rank of "Professor".

== Life and education ==
Dehghani Firouzabadi graduated from the Faculty of Aerospace Engineering, who studied in this field at the undergraduate, graduate and doctoral levels of Sharif University of Technology, and then became a member of the faculty of this university.

== Scientific positions ==
- Cultural and Social Deputy of Sharif University of Technology, 2012–2014.
- Vice President of Research, Technology and Innovation of Islamic Azad University, 2019–2022.

== Political positions ==
- Vice President for Science, Technology and Knowledge-Based Economy and President of the National Elite Foundation, 2022–Present.
