= Iran's National Elites Foundation =

Iranian government body

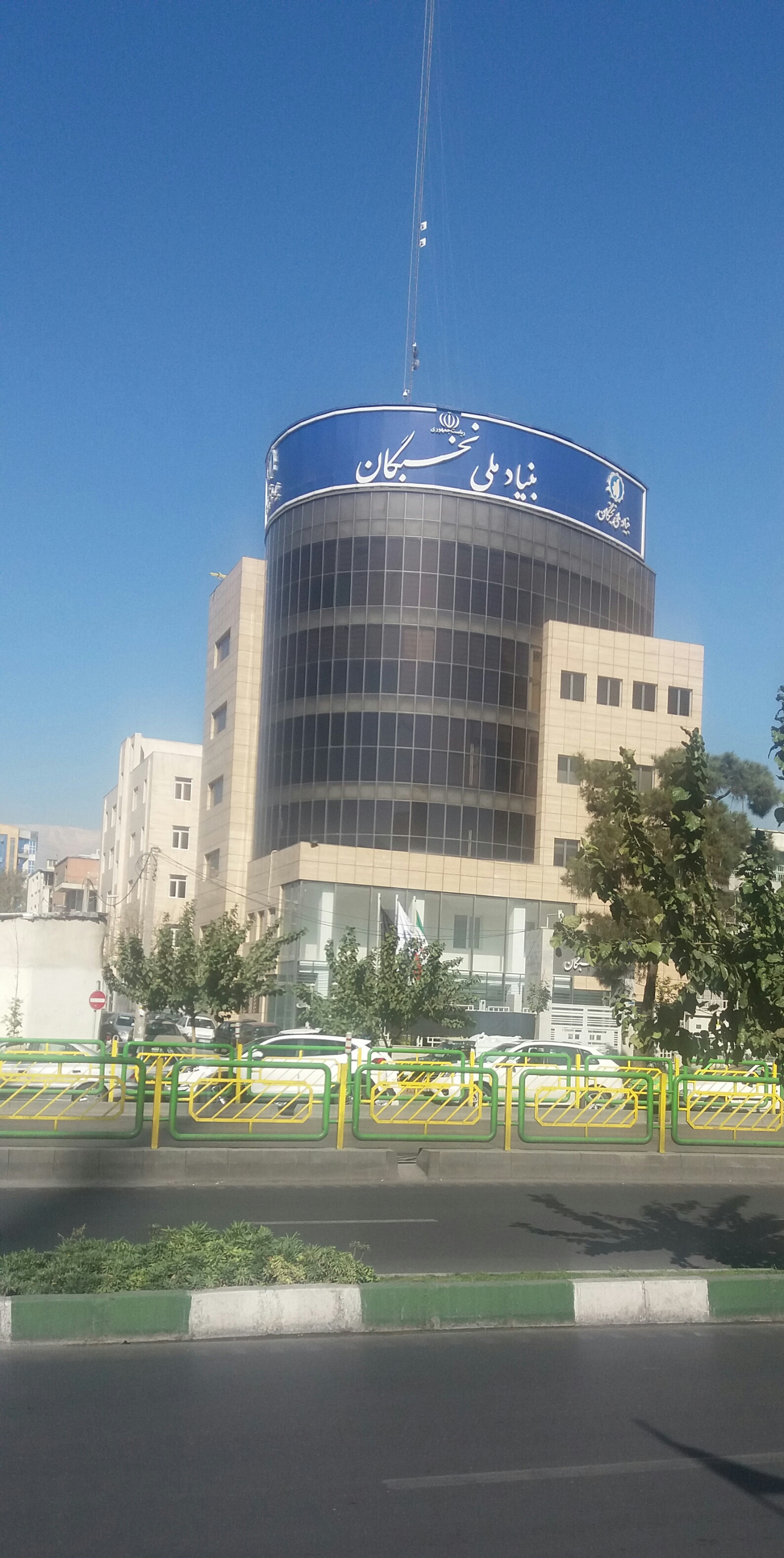
- Formation: 1 June 2004; 22 years ago
- Headquarters: Tehran
- Location: Iran
- Members: 13,025 (2014, including both normal fellows and student members)
- Official language: Persian
- President: Hossein Afshin
- Key people: Saeed Khodaygan (Deputy)
- Budget: 43 billion Iranian Rial (US$1.36 million)
- Staff: 50
- Website: www.bmn.ir

Iran's National Elites Foundation (INEF; Persian: بنياد ملي نخبگان, Bonyad-e Melli-e Nokhebegan) is an Iranian governmental organization. The main purpose of the foundation is to recognize, organize and support Iran's elite national talents.

Members of the foundation include all those who show exceptionally high intellectual capacity, academic aptitude, creative ability and artistic talents, especially contributors in promotion of global science and highly cited scientists and researchers. Iran National Elites Foundation (INEF) is a statewide organization and composed of members with significant scientific and executive background. The INEF members are considered as the most promising researches, inventors and artists of Islamic Republic of Iran, and the young members of the INEF are regarded as those whom will lead the Iran's future science, culture and art. To reach the INEF goals the organization supports its members in scientific, financial/material and pastoral ways, such as granting low-interest or gratuitous loans, supply of any rare sources or laboratory facilities, involving the members with in-demand/priority national projects (in case of young male members, in lieu of the compulsory military service obligations, and exiting the country, as necessary, without assurance for those who have not completed their military service), assisting the members to commercialize their innovations, or move it to policy level, as well as other similar support services and networking opportunities.

== Criteria ==
Based on 2014 Fars News Agency's interview with Soorena Sattari -the INEF president- among more than 77 million population of Iran only 13,000 people have the membership of INEF. However, among those 13000 people only 72 are considered as "elite" and the rest are "highly talented" or "brilliant talent" people whom can be considered as people with Intellectual giftedness. This refers to the members that are not currently elite but he/she is a potential elite. According to INEF a Brilliant Talent or an Intellectual giftedness person is who has the potential to be an actual elite but needs special support, guidance and empowerment to become one in the future. The elite members of INEF are selected based on a different regulation called Allameh Tabatabaei grant; and will be granted the Allameh Tabatabaei award of INEF. Based on Iran National Science Foundation (INSF) only 72 persons had been granted this award

In general, to be considered as a member of INEF there are different criteria to be fulfilled for a researcher, faculty members, award winners, inventor, artist, student, graduate, and anyone whom think of himself or herself as an "elite" or a "brilliant talent". The applicant must be fitted in at least one of the following categories:

1- Ranked 1st – 3rd in the national or international scientific Olympiads (by confirmation from the Ministry of Science, Research and Technology or Ministry of Education and INEF)

2- Award winners at Khwarizmi International Award, Razi, Farabi, Babaei (Rahneshan) or similar prominent scientific festivals (by confirmation from the Ministry of Science, Research)

3- Award winners at the national skills competition or international prominent competitions

4- Having a major role in an important and effective invention or discovery (according to INEF regulations)

5- Ranked 1st–3rd in the national or international Quranic competitions (by confirmation from the Ministry Culture and INEF)

6- Selected highly ranked students in the National Entrance Exam

7- Selected highly ranked students in the Comprehensive Medical Exam

8- National selected students by confirmation from the Ministry of Science, Research and Technology and INEF)

9- Artists with prominent creations according to INEF regulations

10- Selected graduates at BSc., MSc and PhD level.

The INEF system works based on its own pre-defined scoring function. In order to get the membership of the INEF the student, researcher, innovators, awardees and anyone who wanted to get the INEF membership must get the minimum score. Each of the 10 aforementioned categories have its own regulation and scoring function which is discussed in detail at the INEF website. For examples even though every student can apply to be considered for the 10th category but only a few of them will be considered for this category. The same as other categories the scoring function of the 10th is very detailed and a very brief minimum requirements to be evaluated in the system is as follow:

10–1 BSc students: GPA above 85% or the 1st ranked student, recommendation from two professors, and having at least one of the following:

a- At least one paper in ISI or ISC journals based on INEF regulations.

b. Having an effective and significant role in solving an issue or an Applied research with national importance approved based on INEF regulations.

10–2 MSc students: GPA at BSc above 80% and MSc above 85% or the 1st ranked student, recommendation from professors and having at least one of the following:

a- Published Paper in ISI or ISC indexed journals based on INEF regulations

b- Having an effective role in a theory based on INEF regulations

c- Having an effective and significant role in solving an issue or an Applied research with national importance confirmed by the related university and approved based on INEF regulations.

10–3 PhD students: GPA at MSc. and PhD above 85%, Excellent score from PhD thesis, recommendation from professors, and fulfilling at least one of the following:

a- Having at least 3 Published or final accepted Papers executed from their PhD thesis in ISI or ISC indexed journals based on INEF regulations.

b- Having an effective role in a theory based on INEF regulations

c- Having an effective and significant role in solving an issue or Applied research with national importance confirmed by the related university and approved based on INEF regulations.

== Membership ==
All the application for requesting INEF benefits is through Sina electronic system, and from 2013 for non-resident Iranian through the international Plan system of the INEF Deputy of International affairs.

Some benefits such as research grants, military service benefits, housing loans, etc. has to be requested and they are granted just based on the scientific score. People that have done a project instead of military services are not a member nor an associate or collaborative member. They do it to obtain a completion card that allows them to have a normal life, otherwise they would be arrested.
