= Laya Joneydi =

Lawyer Iran's VP

- لعیا جنیدی
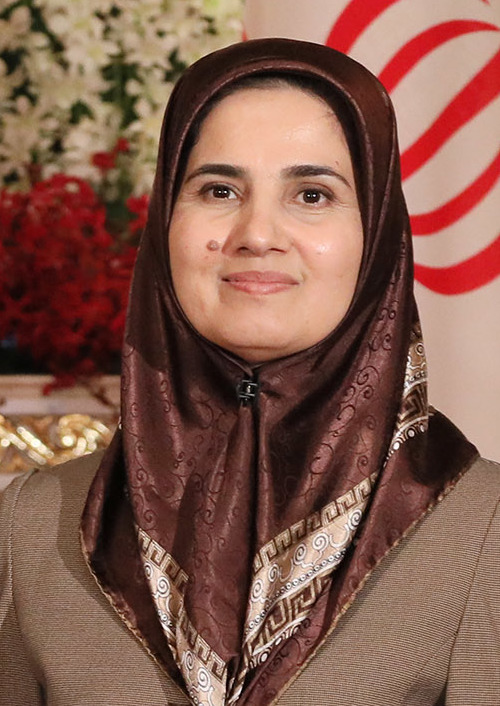
- Joneydi in 2019

Vice President of Iran for Legal Affairs
- In office 9 August 2017 – 1 September 2021
- President: Hassan Rouhani
- Preceded by: Majid Ansari
- Succeeded by: Mohammad Dehghan

Personal details
- Education: University of Tehran Harvard University
- Occupation: Lawyer; academic

Laya Joneidi (Persian: لعیا جنیدی) is an Iranian lawyer and associate professor of private law at University of Tehran, who served as the vice president for legal affairs in the administration of President Hassan Rouhani.

From 2002 to 2003, she worked on research "A Comparative Study of Commercial Arbitration in Islamic Law and Other Major Contemporary Legal Systems" at Harvard Law School.

== Views ==
Joneydi maintains that procedural justice is "inquisitorial and accusatorial". She believes "there is no hindrance that prevents women from serving in judicial posts in Islam".
