= Sorena Sattari =

Iranian scientist and inventor

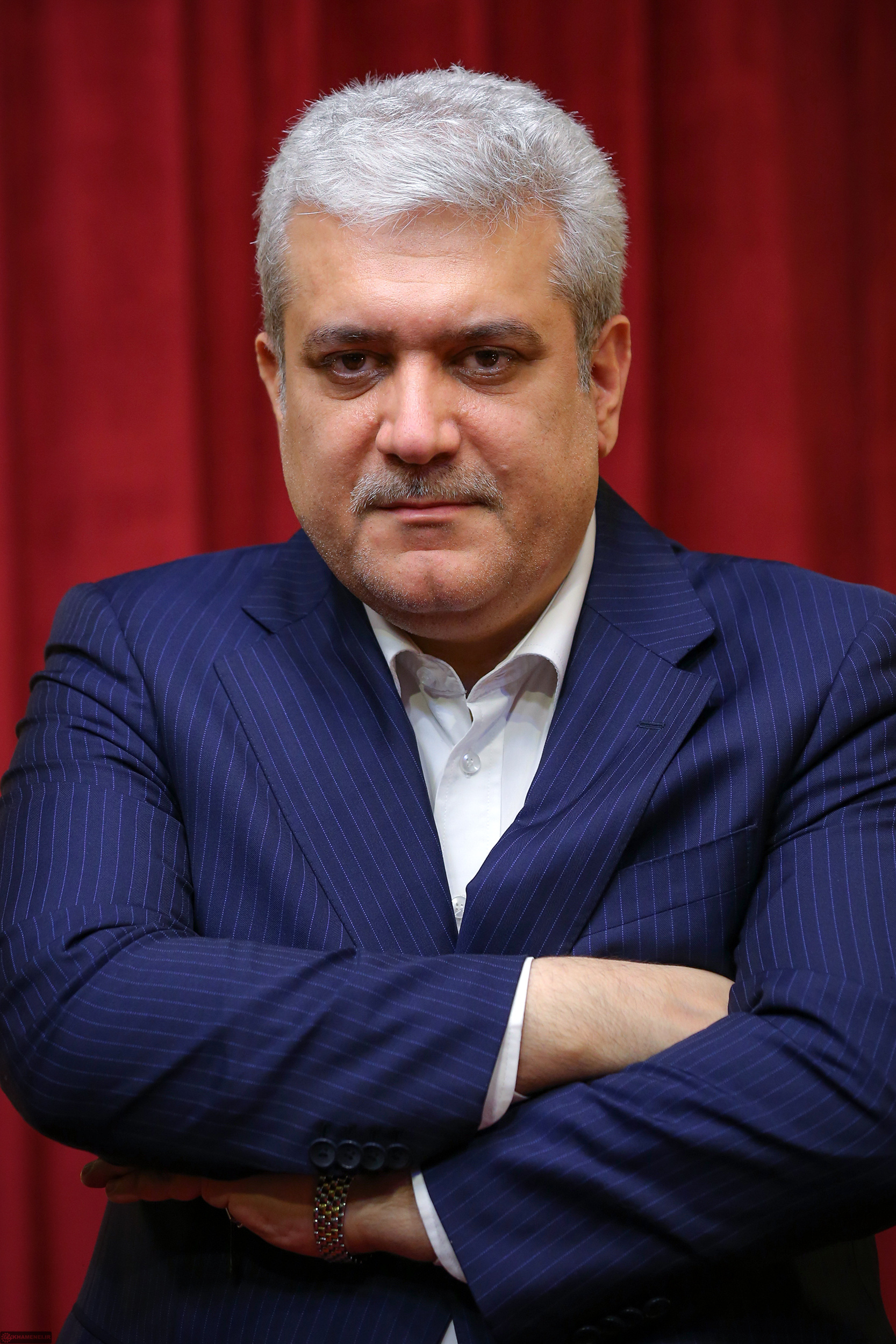
- Sattari in 2022

Vice President of Iran Head of National Elites Foundation
- In office 5 October 2013 – 18 September 2022
- President: Hassan Rouhani; Ebrahim Raisi
- Preceded by: Nasrin Soltankhah
- Succeeded by: Ruhollah Dehghani Firouzabadi

Personal details
- Born: 1972 (age 53–54)
- Education: Sharif University of Technology

Sorena Sattari (Persian: سورنا ستاری; born 1972) is an Iranian scientist and inventor. He was the vice president of science and technology, under President Hassan Rouhani and Ebrahim Raisi from 2013 to 2022.

== Education ==
Sattari received a Bachelor of Science, a Master of Science and a Doctor of Philosophy in Mechanical Engineering from Sharif University of Technology, Iran.
