= Hossein-Ali Amiri =

Iranian politician (b. 1967)

- حسینعلی امیری
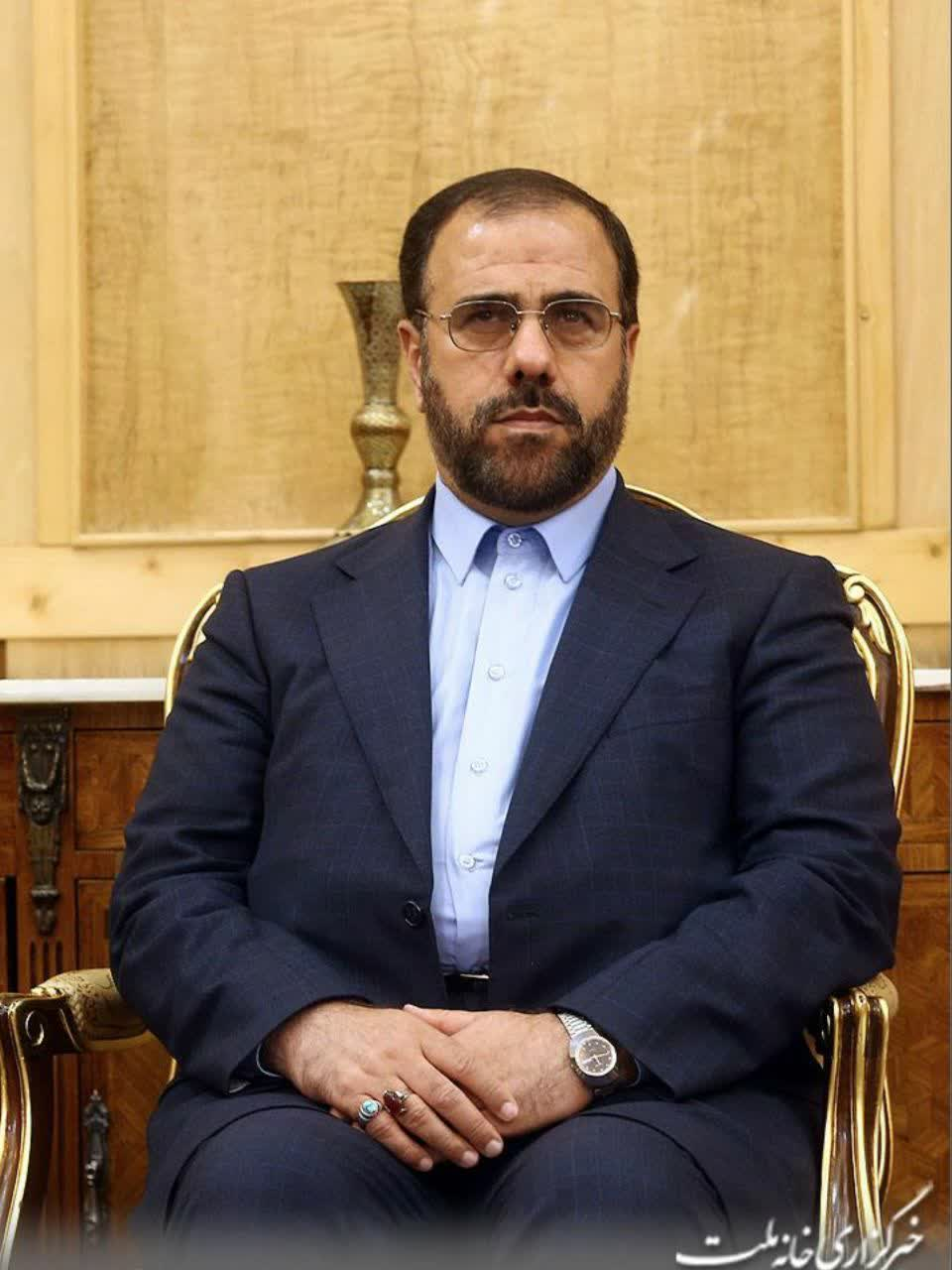
- Portrait of Hoseinali Amiri

Governor General of Fars
- Incumbent
- Assumed office 9 October 2024
- President: Masoud Pezeshkian
- Preceded by: Mohammad-Hadi Imanieh

Vice President of Iran for Parliamentary Affairs
- In office 12 July 2016 – 20 August 2021
- President: Hassan Rouhani
- Preceded by: Majid Ansari
- Succeeded by: Mohammad Hosseini

Vice Minister of Interior for Parliamentary Affairs
- In office 10 September 2013 – 12 July 2016
- Appointed by: Abdolreza Rahmani Fazli
- Preceded by: Mehdi Mohammadifard
- Succeeded by: Salman Samani

Personal details
- Born: January/February 1967 (age 59) Sonqor, Kermanshah, Iran
- Children: 3
- Education: University of Judicial Sciences and Administrative Services; Islamic Azad University, Science and Research Branch
- Occupation: Civil servant
- Profession: Prosecutor
- Cabinet: 11th 12th 14th

Military service
- Battles/wars: Iran–Iraq War

Hossein-Ali Amiri (Persian: حسینعلی امیری; born 1967) is an Iranian jurist and conservative politician who currently serves as the governor general of Fars province since 2024.

He was Vice President of Iran for Parliamentary Affairs from 2016 to 2021. Amiri formerly held office as the deputy of Ministry of Interior under Abdolreza Rahmani Fazli, a member of the Guardian Council and a deputy of Judiciary branch under Mahmoud Hashemi Shahroudi.
