= Pak Yong-il =

North Korean politician (1966–2022)

- 박용일

Vice Chairman of the Standing Committee of the Supreme People's Assembly
- In office 30 August 2019 – 18 September 2022
- Chairman: Choe Ryong-hae

Chairman of the Korean Social Democratic Party
- In office 30 August 2019 – 18 September 2022
- Preceded by: Kim Yong-dae
- Succeeded by: Kim Ho-chol

Personal details
- Born: 1966 North Korea
- Died: 18 September 2022 (aged 56)
- Party: Korean Social Democratic Party
- Education: Kim Il Sung University

Korean name
- Hangul: 박용일
- Hanja: 朴容日
- RR: Bak Yongil
- MR: Pak Yongil

Pak Yong-il (Korean: 박용일; 1966 – 18 September 2022) was a North Korean politician, who served as chairman of the Central Committee of the Korean Social Democratic Party as of 28 August 2019 and vice chairman of the Standing Committee of the Supreme People's Assembly.

== Early life and career ==
Pak Yong-il was born in North Korea in 1966. He attended Kim Il Sung University.

Pak Yong-il became a member of the Peace and Unity Committee, and later became Deputy Chairman of the Peace and Unity Committee in March 2018. He became a member of the Central Committee of the Korean Red Cross in August 2006. He took part in negotiations of the Korean Red Cross representing North Korea. He succeeded Kim Yong-dae as the chairman of the Central Committee of the Social Democratic Party of Korea and Vice President of the Presidium of the Supreme People's Assembly on 28 August 2019.

Pak died on 18 September 2022. On 20 September 2022, North Korean state media reported that leader Kim Jong Un sent a wreath the day before to express condolences over Pak Yong-il's death.

Party political offices
Preceded by Kim Yong-dae	Chairman of the Korean Social Democratic Party; 2019–2022	Succeeded by TBA
