= Mohammad Dehghan =

Iranian conservative politician

Mohammad Dehghani
- محمد دهقان
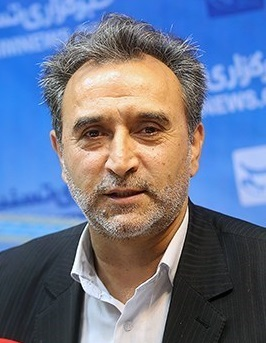
- Dehghan in 2017

Vice President of Iran for Legal Affairs
- In office 1 September 2021 – 22 August 2024
- President: Ebrahim Raisi; Mohammad Mokhber (acting)
- Preceded by: Laya Joneydi
- Succeeded by: Majid Ansari

Member of the Parliament of Iran
- In office 28 May 2004 – 16 July 2019
- Constituency: Chenaran, Torghabeh and Shandiz
- Majority: 84,049 (25.9%)

Personal details
- Born: January 1963 (age 63) Torghabeh, Iran
- Party: Society of Pathseekers of the Islamic Revolution
- Education: Tehran University
- Website: Official website

Mohammad Dehghani Noghondar (often shortened to Mohammad Dehghan, Persian: محمد دهقان; born January 1963) is an Iranian conservative politician, who was formerly served as the Vice President for Legal Affairs.

He is also former jurist member of Guardian Council. He was member of Parliament from Chenaran, Torghabeh and Shandiz district. He was also acting deputy chairman of the parliament in May 2016. He was chairman of Mohammad Bagher Ghalibaf's 2017 presidential campaign.

Party political offices
Preceded by Parviz Sorouri	Secretary-General of Society of Pathseekers of the Islamic Revolution; 2018–2019	Succeeded by Behzad Zare
Preceded by Hossein Mozaffar	Campaign manager of Mohammad-Bagher Ghalibaf; 2017	Vacant
