= Mohammad Hosseini (politician) =

Iranian politician

Seyyed Mohammad Hosseini
- محمد حسینی
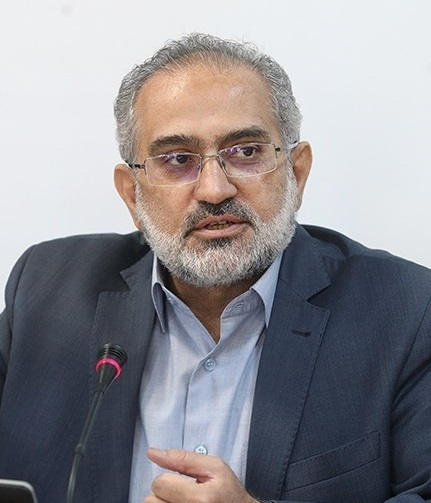
- Hosseini (2021)

Advisor to the President of Iran for Cultural and Social Affairs
- In office 12 May 2024 – 28 July 2024
- President: Ebrahim Raisi
- Preceded by: Hesamodin Ashna (2017)

Vice President of Iran for Parliamentary Affairs
- In office 20 August 2021 – 12 May 2024
- President: Ebrahim Raisi
- Preceded by: Hossein-Ali Amiri
- Succeeded by: Mahmoud Hosseinipour

Minister of Culture and Islamic Guidance
- In office 3 September 2009 – 15 August 2013
- President: Mahmoud Ahmedinejad
- Preceded by: Hossein Saffar Harandi
- Succeeded by: Ali Jannati

Member of the Islamic Consultative Assembly
- In office 25 February 1997 – 28 May 2000
- Constituency: Rafsanjan

Personal details
- Born: 1961 (age 64–65) Rafsanjan, Iran
- Party: YEKTA Front
- Education: University of Tehran

Military service
- Branch/service: Revolutionary Guards
- Battles/wars: Iran–Iraq War

Mohammad Hosseini (Persian: محمد حسینی; born 1961) is an Iranian politician, who served as the vice president for parliamentary affairs in the cabinet of Ebrahim Raisi from 2021 to 2024. He was Advisor to the President of Iran for Cultural and Social Affairs in 2024.

He served as minister of culture in the second cabinet of Mahmoud Ahmadinejad. He is also a military figure and the veteran of the Iran–Iraq War. He is part of the Mahmoud Ahmedinejad's close circle.

== Early life and education ==
Hosseini was born in Rafsanjan in the Kerman province in 1961. He holds a PhD in Islamic jurisprudence and the fundamentals of Islamic law from Tehran University in 1994.

== Career ==
Hosseini joined the Islamic Revolutionary Guard Corps (IRGC) following the 1979 revolution and served during the Iran–Iraq War. After the war, he served in different posts, including the head of the Sorush Publications, deputy director of the Islamic Republic of Iran Broadcasting, and advisor of the Islamic Culture and Relations Organization. He also served as Iran's cultural consular in Kenya. In addition, he taught fiqh and Islamic law at Tehran University. He was also a member of the fifth Majlis, representing his hometown, Rafsanjan, in the 1990s. During his tenure at the Majlis he also worked as the vice minister of science.

Hosseini was appointed minister of culture on 3 September 2009, replacing Hossein Saffar Harandi in the post. Hosseini won 194 votes in favor and 61 votes against at the Majlis. In the cabinet of Mahmoud Ahmedinejad, Hosseini was one of the ministers who had experience in the IRGC.

Hosseini's term ended on 15 August 2013 and he was replaced by Ali Jannati in the post.

=== Sanctions ===
The European Union sanctioned Hosseini in October 2011 due to his alleged repressive approach against journalists in Iran. It was also argued by AFP that he had been reinforcing media censorship and the arrest of journalists in Iran.
