= Marvin Rodríguez Cordero =

Costa Rican politician

Marvin Rodríguez
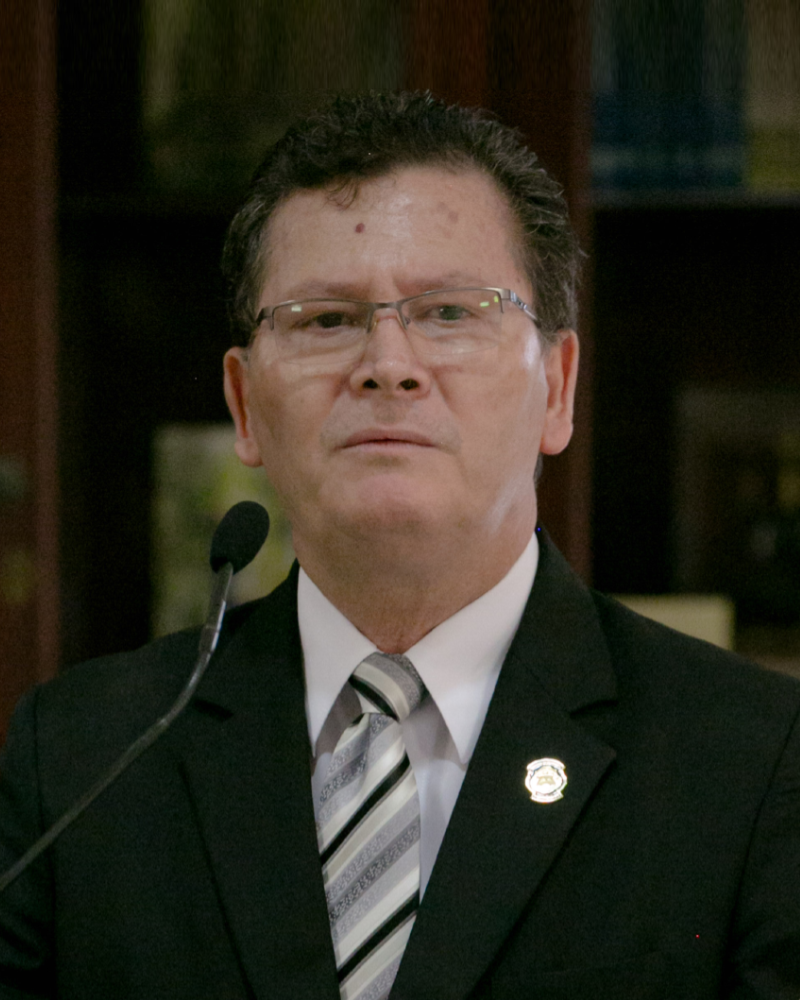

Second Vice-President of Costa Rica
- In office 8 May 2018 – 8 May 2022 Serving with Epsy Campbell Barr
- President: Carlos Alvarado
- Preceded by: Ana Helena Chacón
- Succeeded by: Mary Munive

Personal details
- Born: Marvin Rodríguez Cordero; 20 October 1960 (age 65) Puntarenas, Costa Rica
- Party: Citizens' Action Party

Marvin Rafael de los Ángeles Rodríguez Cordero (born 20 October 1960) is a Costa Rican politician, teacher and labor union leader who served as the Second Vice President of Costa Rica from 8 May 2018 to 8 May 2022.

Son of Danilo Rodríguez Blanco and Rafaela Cordero Barquero, farmers without studies, Rodriguez entered the Colegio Técnico Profesional Agropecuario (Agricultural Technical Professional School) at the age of 14 while working in farming alongside his father. He participated in various communal activities including the presidency of the Integral Development Association of La Esperanza de Paquera at 18 years of age. In addition to serving as an educator, Rodríguez was Secretary General of the Costa Rican Education Workers Union (SEC), which together with other teachers' unions organized the general strike of educators that took place in 2014 right between the change of government of Laura Chinchilla and Luis Guillermo Solís due to delays in the payment of salaries.

Rodriguez was nominated to serve as vice president on a ticket alongside Carlos Alvarado that was successful in the Costa Rican elections of 2018. Alvarado chose Rodríguez due to his knowledge in the education and community sectors, along with his interest in promoting an educational reform.

Political offices
Preceded by Ana Helena Chacón	Second Vice-President of Costa Rica; 2018–2022	Succeeded by Mary Munive
