= María Antonia Rivera =

Honduran politician (born 1966)

María Antonia Rivera Rosales

3rd Vice President of Honduras
- In office 26 January 2018 – 27 January 2022
- President: Juan Orlando Hernández
- Preceded by: Lorena Enriqueta Herrera Estevez
- Succeeded by: Renato Florentino

Personal details
- Born: 26 October 1966 (age 59) San Pedro Sula
- Party: National Party
- Education: Universidad Nacional Autónoma de Honduras

María Antonia Rivera Rosales (born 26 October 1966 in San Pedro Sula) is a former Vice President of Honduras under Juan Orlando Hernández from 2018 to 2022. She is from the National Party.

== Career ==
She was a member of the negotiating team for free trade agreements on behalf of the private sector in CAFTA, and agreements with EU, Panama and Peru. From 2004 to 2012 she represented various producer interest groups as executive director.

She was elected as third designate to the presidency of Honduras in January 2018. In September 2019 she was also appointed as the secretary of economic development.
