= Vice President of Mali =

Deputy head of state of Mali

Vice President of the Republic of Mali
- Vice-président de la République du Mali
- Emblem of Mali
- Residence: Koulouba Palace, Bamako
- Formation: 19 November 1968
- First holder: Yoro Diakité and Amadou Baba Diarra
- Final holder: Assimi Goïta
- Abolished: 25 February 2022

The vice president of Mali (French: Vice-président du Mali) was an ad hoc governmental position in Mali. There is no provision for a vice president in the Constitution of Mali and the position has only existed under military regimes. Normally, the constitution instead designates the Prime Minister and the President of the National Assembly step in as interim presidents during temporary and absolute absences, respectively.

== List of vice presidents of Mali ==
Portrait	Name (Birth–Death)	Took office	Left office	Notes
	Yoro Diakité; 1st Vice President (1932–1973)	19 November 1968	March 1971	Military (CMLN)
	Amadou Baba Diarra; 2nd Vice President (1933–2008)	19 November 1968	1979	Military (CMLN)
	Seyba Traoré	March 2012	April 2012	Military (CNRDRE)
	Malick Diaw (born 1979)	19 August 2020	25 September 2020	Military (CNSP)
	Assimi Goïta (born 1983)	25 September 2020	25 May 2021	Military (CNSP)

== See also ==
- Politics of Mali
- List of heads of state of Mali
- First Lady of Mali
- List of prime ministers of Mali
