= Council of Deputies =

Constitutional body in Samoa

The Council of Deputies (Samoan: Sui O Le Fono a Sui Tofia) is a constitutional body in Samoa. A dormant commission, its members serve as Deputy O le Ao o le Malo and act as head of state when the office of O le Ao o le Malo is vacant or when the incumbent is unable to fulfill their duties due to absence or incapacitation.

The Council was established by the constitution at independence on 1 January 1962. It consists of between one and three members, who are elected by the Legislative Assembly. If there are no members, the Chief Justice acts in their place. Elections to the Council are required to take place as soon as possible after a new O le Ao o le Malo is elected.

== Members ==
- Tuiaana Tuimalealiʻifano Suatipatipa II (1962–1974)
- Tupua Tamasese Lealofi IV (1968–1970, 1976–1983)
- Mataʻafa Puela Faʻasuamaleaui Patu
- Tuimalealiʻifano Vaʻaletoʻa Sualauvi II (1993–2001, 2004–2017)
- Faumuina Anapapa (2002–2006)
- Tui Ātua Tupua Tamasese Efi (2004–2007, 2025–present)
- Tuiloma Pule Lameko (2016–2018)
- Le Mamea Ropati (2016–2024)
- Malietoa Moli II (2025–present)
- Le Laulu Tiatia Mapesone Mapusua (2025–present)

== See also ==
- Presidential Commission, a similar body in the Republic of Ireland
