= Taban Deng Gai =

South Sudanese politician (born c. 1950)

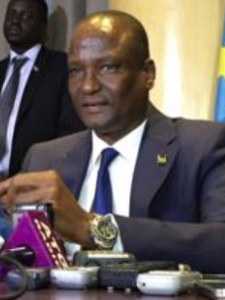
- Deng in 2016

Third Vice President of South Sudan
- In office 21 February 2020 – 21 September 2026
- President: Salva Kiir
- Preceded by: Position established

2nd First Vice President of South Sudan
- In office 23 July 2016 – 21 February 2020
- President: Salva Kiir
- Preceded by: Riek Machar
- Succeeded by: Riek Machar

Personal details
- Born: c. 1950 (Note: According to journalist Fred Oluoch, he was in his "late 60s" in 2016.)(75 age) Kerial, Sudan
- Party: SPLM
- Occupation: Politician

Taban Deng Gai is a South Sudanese politician who was one of the Vice Presidents of South Sudan in the unity government from February 2020 to September 2026. He served as the First Vice President of South Sudan from 23 July 2016 to February 2020. He was mining minister before being appointed as acting first vice president.

== Biography ==
Born around 1950 in the village of Kerial in what is today Unity State, (Note: Kerial no longer exists, as it was destroyed during the Sudanese Civil Wars.) Deng is an ethnic Nuer. He self-identifies as member of the Jikany subgroup of the Nuer, even though his home village was a Leek Nuer settlement. According to journalist Fred Oluoch, he is also of partial Arab descent.

Taban Deng Gai is closely connected to the family of Riek Machar, being the latter's brother-in-law as well as the cousin of Machar's wife Angelina Teny. In course of the Second Sudanese Civil War, he served as administrator of the refugee camp of Itang, as head of the SPLA's relief wing in Nasir, and as Machar's quartermaster. When Machar's loyalists split from the SPLA (Mainstream) and formed the SPLA-Nasir, Deng acted as the main intermediary between the latter and the Sudanese government. SPLA-Nasir eventually came to a tenative agreement with the Sudanese government, and its political wing took part in southern Sudanese politics. Deng was consequently elected governor of Unity State, resulting in tensions between Machar and another local pro-government militia leader, Paulino Matip Nhial, which escalated in violence from 1998 to 1999. He was the governor of Unity State from 1997 to 1999, and Deputy Minister of Roads and Bridges from 1999 to 2000.

He again served as governor of Unity State from 30 September 2005. In the April 2010 elections the state electoral body announced that Taban Deng Gai won by 137,662 votes, beating his cousin and runner-up Angelina Teny who won 63,561 votes. The results were heavily disputed, with Teny accusing Deng of having used militants to intimidate her supporters. The election contributed to the estrangement of Deng from Teny, and, by extension, from Machar. When the South Sudanese Civil War broke out, Deng initially joined the SPLM-IO rebels of Riek Machar, and became the latter's second-in-command. Deng eventually became the rebel chief negotiator with the South Sudanese government under President Salva Kiir. In August 2015, the SPLM-IO and the government agreed to a power-sharing deal which left Deng deeply dissatisfied, as he was supposed to be appointed mining minister instead of petroleum minister, as he had wished. He consequently began to secretly collude with Kiir's forces. Although the SPLM/A-IO military intelligence discovered his activities, the rebel leadership refused to believe the intelligence. In April 2016, he resigned as rebel chief negotiator, claiming that had to fully devote himself to his new position as mining minister. Instead, Deng fully defected to the government after the Battle of Juba in July 2016, and officially replaced Machar as First Vice President. A substantial number of insurgents followed him, and became known as the Juba faction of the SPLM/A-IO. They subsequently began to fight alongside the government force against Machar's loyalists, resulting in Deng being regarded as "traitor" by other rebels.

He joined again the rulling party in May 2018.

As part of the overall agreements to end the civil war, several new cabinet positions were created in 2020. Taban Deng Gai was appointed "Third Vice President of South Sudan". In this position, he has been mainly concerned with infrastructure projects. By 2022, he oversaw the construction of a new highway linking South Sudan and Ethiopia.

== Sanctions ==
In January 2020, The U.S. Treasury Department sanctioned Deng "for his involvement in serious human rights abuse, including the disappearance and deaths of civilians." Deng has however refuted the allegations that he is involved in any human rights abuse in South Sudan, describing himself as a "man of peace."
