= Vice President of South Sudan =

Deputy head of state of the Republic of South Sudan

First Vice President of the Republic of South Sudan
- Flag of South Sudan
- Incumbent; Vacant since 21 September 2026
- Appointer: President of South Sudan
- Inaugural holder: Riek Machar
- Formation: 21 February 2020
- Website: op.gov.ss/vice-presidents/

The vice president of South Sudan is the second highest political position obtainable in South Sudan. Additionally, a temporary position called first vice president was created in August 2015. In 2020, a coalition agreement was reached in 2020 creating five vice presidents. The vice presidents of this unity government were dismissed in September 2026 ahead of the 2026 general election.

== Vice presidents (2005–2020) ==
This list contains vice presidents of Southern Sudan (2005–2011, autonomous region of Sudan) and vice presidents of the Republic of South Sudan (2011–present, independent country).

Colour key (for political parties):

Sudan People's Liberation Movement
Sudan People's Liberation Movement-in-Opposition
South Sudan Opposition Alliance

=== Vice presidents of the Southern Sudan autonomous region (2005–2011) ===
| Portrait | Name | Term of office | | | Political affiliation | President |
| Portrait | Name | Took office | Left office | Time in office | Political affiliation | President |
|---|---|---|---|---|---|---|
| | Salva Kiir | 9 July 2005 | 30 July 2005 | 21 days | SPLM | John Garang |
| Vacant (30 July – 11 August 2005) | | | | | | Salva Kiir |
| | Riek Machar | 11 August 2005 | 9 July 2011 | 5 years, 332 days | SPLM | Salva Kiir |

=== Vice presidents of the Republic of South Sudan (2011–2020) ===
| Portrait | Name | Term of office | | | Political affiliation | President |
| Portrait | Name | Took office | Left office | Time in office | Political affiliation | President |
|---|---|---|---|---|---|---|
| | Riek Machar | 9 July 2011 | 23 July 2013 | 2 years, 14 days | SPLM | Salva Kiir |
| Vacant (23 July – 25 August 2013) | | | | | | Salva Kiir |
| | James Wani Igga | 25 August 2013 | 21 February 2020 | 6 years, 180 days | SPLM | Salva Kiir |

=== First vice presidents of the Republic of South Sudan (2016–2020) ===
Following the signing of the Agreement on the Resolution of the Conflict in the Republic of South Sudan (ARCSS) in August 2015 a new position of 'first vice president' was established alongside the pre-existing positions of President of South Sudan and Vice President of South Sudan, with the incumbents in both these positions continuing in office. Unlike the positions of president and vice president, which are permanent features of the Constitution, the office of first vice president will cease to exist following the end of the transitional period stipulated in the ARCSS unless otherwise decided in the permanent Constitution.

| Portrait | Name | Term of office | | | Political affiliation | President |
| Portrait | Name | Took office | Left office | Time in office | Political affiliation | President |
|---|---|---|---|---|---|---|
| | Riek Machar | 26 April 2016 | 26 July 2016 | 91 days | SPLM-IO | Salva Kiir |
| | Taban Deng Gai | 26 July 2016 | 21 February 2020 | 3 years, 210 days | SPLM-IO (Juba faction) SPLM | Salva Kiir |

== Vice presidents in the Revitalised Government of National Unity (2020–2026) ==
The Revitalised Transitional Government of National Unity (RTGoNU) was formed in February 2020 and included five vice presidents. Two new vice-presidents were appointed during a cabinet reshuffle on 10 February 2025. The vice presidents of the RTGoNU were dismissed in September 2026 ahead of the 2026 elections.

| Position | Portrait | Name | Term of office | | | Political affiliation | President |
| Position | Portrait | Name | Took office | Left office | Time in office | Political affiliation | President |
|---|---|---|---|---|---|---|---|
| First | | Riek Machar | 21 February 2020 | 21 September 2026 | 6 years, 212 days | SPLM-IO | Salva Kiir |
| Vacant (21 September 2026 – present) | | | | | | | Salva Kiir |
| Second | | James Wani Igga | 21 February 2020 | 10 February 2025 | 4 years, 355 days | SPLM | Salva Kiir |
| Second | | Benjamin Bol Mel | 10 February 2025 | 12 November 2025 | 275 days | SPLM | Salva Kiir |
| Second | | James Wani Igga | 17 November 2025 | 21 September 2026 | 308 days | SPLM | Salva Kiir |
| Vacant (21 September 2026 – present) | | | | | | | Salva Kiir |
| Third | | Taban Deng Gai | 21 February 2020 | 21 September 2026 | 6 years, 212 days | SPLM | Salva Kiir |
| Vacant (21 September 2026 – present) | | | | | | | Salva Kiir |
| Fourth | | Rebecca Nyandeng Garang | 21 February 2020 | 21 September 2026 | 6 years, 212 days | SPLM (Former Detainees faction) | Salva Kiir |
| Vacant (21 September 2026 – present) | | | | | | | Salva Kiir |
| Fifth | | Hussein Abdelbagi | 21 February 2020 | 10 February 2025 | 4 years, 355 days | SSOA | Salva Kiir |
| Fifth | | Josephine Lagu | 10 February 2025 | 26 February 2026 | 1 year, 16 days | SSOA | Salva Kiir |
| Fifth | | Hussein Abdelbagi | 26 February 2026 | 21 September 2026 | 207 days | SSOA | Salva Kiir |
| Vacant (21 September 2026 – present) | | | | | | | Salva Kiir |

== See also ==
- Southern Sudan Autonomous Region (1972–1983)
- Southern Sudan Autonomous Region (2005–2011)
  - Politics of South Sudan
  - History of South Sudan
  - List of governors of pre-independence Sudan
  - List of heads of state of South Sudan
