= Vice President of the Kurdistan Region =

Deputy head of the Kurdistan Region in Iraq

Vice President of Kurdistan Region
- Flag of Kurdistan
- Incumbent; Jaafar Sheikh Mustafa and Mustafa Said Qadir since July 2019
- Style: His Excellency
- Appointer: Vote in the Kurdistan Region Parliament
- Term length: Four years, renewable once
- Inaugural holder: Kosrat Rasul Ali
- Formation: 14 June 2005
- Website: presidency.gov.krd

The vice president of the Kurdistan Region is the deputy head of the semi-autonomous Kurdistan Region in northern Iraq. They are part of the Kurdistan Presidency Council. The vice presidents assist the president in his or her duties and in the president's absence is the acting president.

On 14 June 2005 Masoud Barzani was sworn in by the Kurdistan Region Parliament as new president. Kurdistan National Assembly elected Kosrat Rasul Ali as the vice president of the Kurdistan Region.

== List of vice presidents ==
No.	Portrait	Name (Birth–Death)	Term of office			Political party
No.	Portrait	Name (Birth–Death)	Took office	Left office	Time in office	Political party
1		Kosrat Rasul Ali (born 1952)	14 June 2005	1 November 2017	12 years, 140 days	Patriotic Union of Kurdistan
2		Jaafar Sheikh Mustafa (born 1950)	8 September 2019	Incumbent	7 years, 0 days	Patriotic Union of Kurdistan
3		Mustafa Said Qadir (born 1958)	8 September 2019	Incumbent	7 years, 0 days	Gorran Movement

== See also ==
- President of Kurdistan Region
- Prime Minister of Kurdistan Region
