= Jaafar Sheikh Mustafa =

Kurdistan Region politician

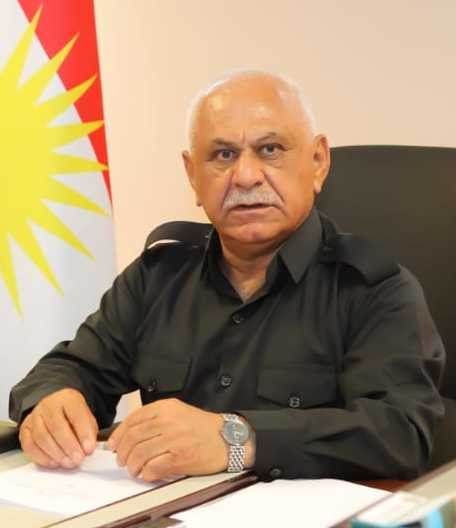

Vice President of Kurdistan Region
- Incumbent
- Assumed office 8 September 2019 Serving with Mustafa Said Qadir
- President: Nechirvan Barzani
- Preceded by: Kosrat Rasul Ali

Personal details
- Born: 1 July 1950 (age 75) Sulaymaniyah, Iraq
- Party: Patriotic Union of Kurdistan

Jaafar Sheikh Mustafa (Kurdish: جەعفەر شێخ مستەفا, romanized: C'efer Şêx Mistefa; born 1 July 1950 in Qaradagh, Suliymaniyah) is the current Vice President of Kurdistan Region under Nechirvan Idris Barzani's administration. He is a member of the Patriotic Union of Kurdistan.

He joined the Peshmerga partisans in 1969 and became head of administration of Aylul revolts (Kurdish: شۆڕشی ئەیلوول) in 1975, which is the First Iraqi–Kurdish War. In 1979 he joined The New Revolution movement and returned to the battlefield as commander of (Qaradagh 55 Division). In 1981, he became commander of (Bazian 2 Division). In 1982 he served as colonel/brigadier general of (Piramagrun 47 Regiment). Three years later, in 1985, he became Lieutenant General of (Erbil 4 Region) until the Anfal genocide (1986-1988). During the great Kurdish uprising in 1991 he was a commander of unit/district (1) of Darbandikhan, Khanaqin and Khrmatu as head of the uprising plan. In 1992 he became deputy general commander of Khanaqin and Garmian district, and alter that year became Erbil district commander. During the first Kurdish Parliament election in 1992 he was elected as an MP and then became vice minister of Peshmerga forces. Jaafar Sheikh Mustafa was one of the most active generals during the war against Islamist terrorists such as Ansar al-Islam and Daesh ISIL (2014-2017). From 2001 to 2003 on request of Jalal Talabani, he returned as the Head of Peshmerga forces across Kurdistan Region. He also served as the Minister of Peshmerga Affairs in the Kurdistan Regional Government's seventh cabinet, from 2012 to 2016. Sheikh Jaafar remains one of the most active military commanders.

From 2014 he commanded the Peshmerga (70 forces), fighting against the Daesh ISIL until his election as Vice President of Kurdistan Region in 2019. He played a key role in the decisive Battle of Mosul. He was appointed as Vice President by President Nechirvan Barzani on September 8, 2019.
