= Mustafa Said Qadir =

Kurdistan Region politician

Vice President of Kurdistan Region
- Incumbent
- Assumed office 8 September 2019 Serving with Jaafar Sheikh Mustafa
- President: Nechirvan Barzani
- Preceded by: Kosrat Rasul Ali

Personal details
- Born: 6 July 1958 (age 68)
- Party: Gorran Movement

Mustafa Said Qadir (born 6 July 1958) is an Iraqi politician who has been Vice President of Kurdistan Region alongside Jaafar Sheikh Mustafa and under President Nechirvan Barzani since 2019. During Ba'athist Iraq he was a political prisoner. He was a member of the Kurdish National Assembly and Kurdistan Region Parliament. He was a member of the Komala Party of Iranian Kurdistan and Gorran Movement.

== Early life ==
Mustafa Said Qadir was born in Qaladiza, Iraq, on 6 July 1958, to Said Qadir Mustafa Aziz. He graduated from the Technical Institute of Agriculture in 1979. He was a political prisoner during the time of Ba'athist Iraq.

== Career ==
Qadir joined the Komala Party of Iranian Kurdistan in 1980. He was a member of the Gorran Movement and is a member of the Patriotic Union of Kurdistan (PUK). He became a member of the PUK politburo after the second session of the Kurdistan Region Parliament.

Qadir won a seat in Kurdish National Assembly in the 1992 election. He was appointed minister of the interior in 1998. He was a member of the first session of the Kurdistan Region Parliament in 2001. Qadir was a deputy commander of Peshmerga forces and led thousands of militiamen. He supported the construction of United States military bases in Kurdistan in 2006.

Jaafar Sheikh Mustafa and Qadir were appointed Vice President of the Kurdistan Region by President Nechirvan Barzani on 8 September 2019. Qadir was a member of the Kurdish delegation to President Ebrahim Raisi's funeral in 2024.

== Personal life ==
Qadir is married and is the father of five children.

== Works cited ==
- Sprenger, Sebastian (2006). "Nations to Kick Off Initiative Against Nuclear Terrorism Next Week". Inside the Pentagon. 22 (43). Inside Washington Publishers: 1, 14–15. doi:10.2307/insipent.22.43.03. JSTOR insipent.22.43.03.
