= List of female members of the Cabinet of Iran =

This is a list of women who have served as members of the Cabinet of Iran.

== List ==
No.	Portrait	Name	Office	Term in office		Affiliation	Head of government
No.	Portrait	Name	Office	Assumed	Left	Affiliation	Head of government
1		Farrokhroo Parsa	Minister of Education	1968	1971	New Iran Party	Amir Abbas Hoveida
2		Mahnaz Afkhami	Minister without portfolio for Women's Affairs	1976	1978	Resurgence Party	Amir Abbas Hoveida
2		Mahnaz Afkhami	Minister without portfolio for Women's Affairs	1976	1978	Resurgence Party	Jamshid Amouzegar
3		Masoumeh Ebtekar	Head of Department of Environment	1997	2005	Islamic Iran Participation Front	Mohammad Khatami
3		Masoumeh Ebtekar	Head of Department of Environment	2013	2017	Islamic Iran Participation Front	Hassan Rouhani
3		Masoumeh Ebtekar	Vice President for Women's and Family Affairs	2017	2021	Islamic Iran Participation Front	Hassan Rouhani
4		Fatemeh Javadi	Head of Department of Environment	2005	2009	—	Mahmoud Ahmadinejad
5		Marzieh Vahid-Dastjerdi	Minister of Health	2009	2013	Zeynab Society	Mahmoud Ahmadinejad
6		Nasrin Soltankhah	Head of National Elites Foundation	2009	2013	—	Mahmoud Ahmadinejad
7		Fatemeh Bodaghi	Vice President for Legal Affairs	2009	2013	—	Mahmoud Ahmadinejad
8		Maryam Mojtahedzadeh	Vice President for Women's and Family Affairs	2013		—	Mahmoud Ahmadinejad
9		Elham Aminzadeh	Vice President for Legal Affairs	2013	2016	—	Hassan Rouhani
10		Shahindokht Molaverdi	Vice President for Women's and Family Affairs	2013	2019	Islamic Iran Participation Front	Hassan Rouhani
11		Zahra Ahmadipour	Head of Cultural Heritage, Handicrafts and Tourism Organization	2016	2017	Islamic Association of University Instructors	Hassan Rouhani
12		Laya Joneydi	Vice President for Legal Affairs	2017	2021	—	Hassan Rouhani
13		Ensieh Khazali	Vice President for Women's and Family Affairs	2021	2024	—	Ebrahim Raisi
14		Zahra Behrouz Azar	Vice President for Women's and Family Affairs	2024	Incumbent	—	Masoud Pezeshkian
15		Shina Ansari	Head of Department of Environment	2024	Incumbent	—	Masoud Pezeshkian
16		Farzaneh Sadegh	Minister of Roads and Urban Development	2024	Incumbent	—	Masoud Pezeshkian

== See also ==
- List of female members of the Islamic Consultative Assembly
