= Afkhami =

Afkhami is a surname. Notable people with the surname include:

- Behrooz Afkhami (born 1956), Iranian film director and screenwriter
- Gholam Reza Afkhami (1936–2024), Iranian historian
- Mahnaz Afkhami (born 1941), Iranian academic, activist, and writer
- Shahruz Afkhami (born 1962), Iranian politician

== See also ==
- Afkham
