= Masoumeh Ebtekar =

Iranian politician (born 1960)

- معصومه ابتکار
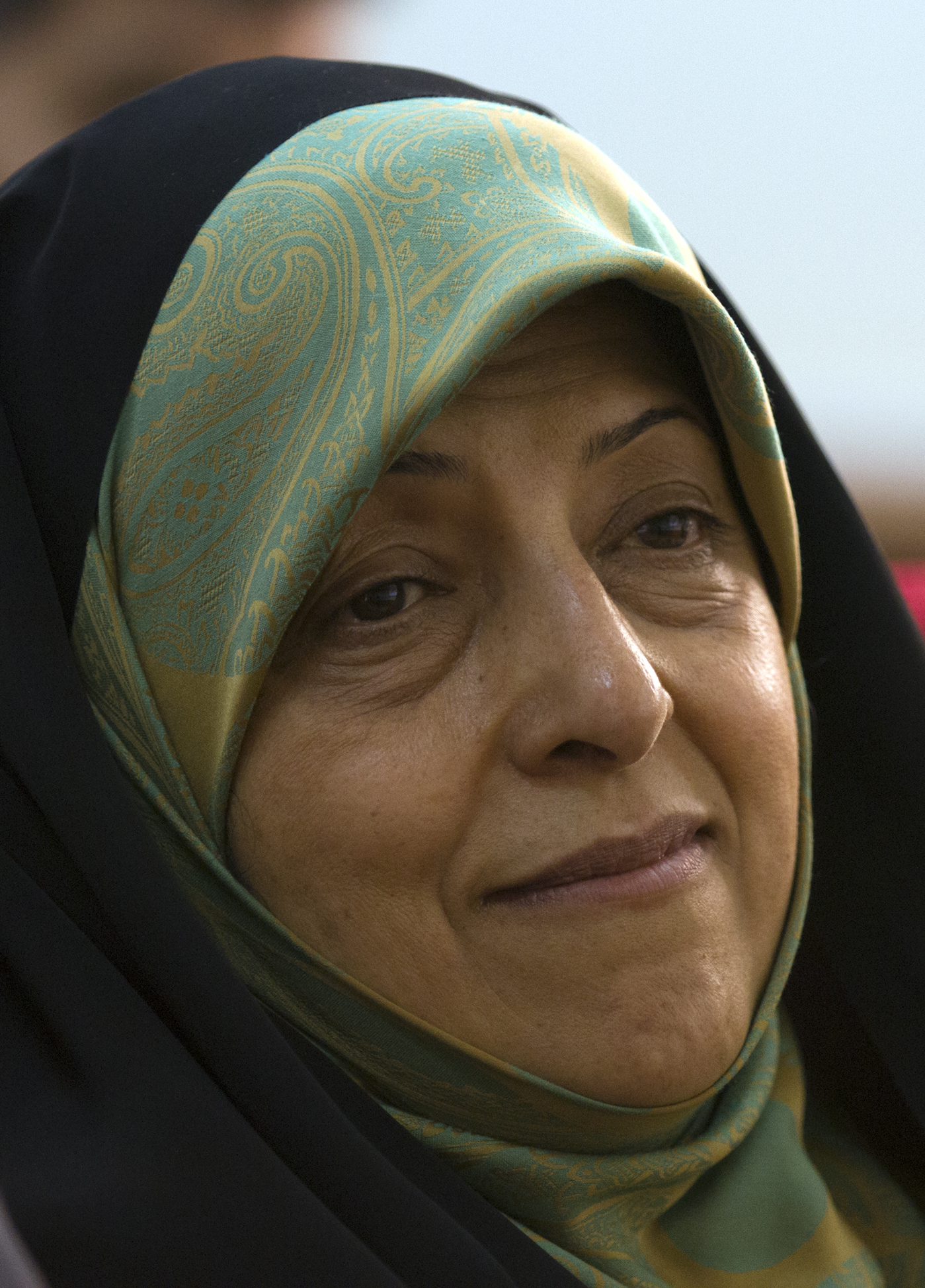
- Ebtekar in 2016

Vice President for Women and Family Affairs
- In office 9 August 2017 – 1 September 2021
- President: Hassan Rouhani
- Preceded by: Shahindokht Molaverdi
- Succeeded by: Ensieh Khazali

Head of the Department of Environment
- In office 10 September 2013 – 13 August 2017
- President: Hassan Rouhani
- Preceded by: Javad Mohammadizadeh
- Succeeded by: Isa Kalantari
- In office 23 August 1997 – 7 September 2005
- President: Mohammad Khatami
- Preceded by: Hadi Manafi
- Succeeded by: Fatemeh Javadi

Member of the Islamic City Council of Tehran
- In office 29 April 2007 – 3 September 2013
- Majority: 232,959 (14.06%)

Personal details
- Born: 21 September 1960 (age 66) Tehran, Imperial State of Iran
- Party: Islamic Iran Participation Front (1998–2010); Union of Islamic Iran People Party (2010–present)
- Spouse: Mohammad Hashemi (m. 1981)
- Children: 2 Eissa Hashemi Eissa-Hashemi
- Parent(s): Taghi Ebtekar (father); Fatemeh Barzegar (mother)
- Education: Shahid Beheshti University (BSc); Tarbiat Modares University (MSc, PhD)
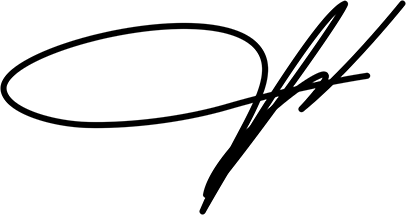
- Signature

Masoumeh Ebtekar (Persian: معصومه ابتکار; born 21 September 1960) is an Iranian politician. A Reformist, she headed the country's Department of Environment from 1997 to 2005 and again from 2013 to 2017, after which she served as the Vice President for Women and Family Affairs from 2017 to 2021. Her appointment to the Cabinet of Iran in 1997 marked her as the institution's third female member overall and the first female member since the Islamic Revolution in 1979. She is currently a full-time professor in the Immunology Department of the School of Medical Sciences at Tarbiat Modares University in the city of Tehran.

During the Iran hostage crisis, which began in November 1979 and ended in January 1981, Ebtekar was the spokesperson for the Muslim Student Followers of the Imam's Line. Variously nicknamed "Mary", "Sister Mary" and "Screaming Mary", by the American media, so-named after her broadcasts in American English, she and her colleagues occupied the Embassy of the United States in Tehran, where they held American citizens in captivity for 444 days with the approval of Ruhollah Khomeini, who had recently seized power as the Supreme Leader of Iran. The hostage crisis triggered ongoing hostilities between Iran and the United States. However, despite her views, Ebtekar's oldest son Eissa Hashemi has been residing in the United States since the early 2010s, prompting criticism from opponents of the Islamic Republic government. In April 2026, U.S federal agents arrested Eissa, his wife, Maryam, and their son, revoking their permanent resident status. They are currently in detention and awaiting deportation because of their relationship with Ebtekar.

Between 2007 and 2013, Ebtekar was part of the Islamic City Council of Tehran. In 1998, she joined the Islamic Iran Participation Front, which was banned in 2010, and has since been affiliated with the Union of Islamic Iran People Party.

== Early life and education ==
Ebtekar was born in Tehran, Iran as Masoumeh Niloufar Ebtekar in a middle-class family. Her first name translates to "Innocent Water Lily" in English. Ebtekar's father studied at the University of Pennsylvania, and she lived with her parents in Upper Darby Township, Pennsylvania, just outside Philadelphia. During her six years in Philadelphia, she developed "near-perfect, American-accented English." Returning to Iran she enrolled in Iranzamin (Tehran International School). Later after graduation as a student, she became a supporter of the political Islam of Ali Shariati and began wearing a traditional black chador covering everything except her face.

Ebtekar holds a BSc degree in laboratory science from Shahid Beheshti University, a MSc and PhD in immunology from Tarbiat Modares University in 1995, where she still teaches. Ebtekar is married to Seyyed Mohammad Hashemi who is a businessman in the private sector. They have two children.

== Academic career ==
Ebtekar has served as faculty member at Tarbiat Modares University, which is a postgraduate academic center located in Tehran. As Professor of Immunology, she has taught, supervised and advised PhD and MSc students. Ebtekar currently teaches cytokines, viral immunology, HIV vaccines, aging, immunology of the nervous system and psychoneuroimmunology. She has currently filed 72 ISI scientific articles in the field of immunology in Scopus in her name. In her speech to the Eleventh International Congress of Immunology in Tehran, she mentioned the detrimental effect of sanctions on the advancement of science in Iran and noted that sanctions should not be directed against nations. Ebtekar is a member of several research board committees and a reviewer for two international and four national immunology journals. Ebtekar was promoted to full Professorship in January 2019 and elected as Immunology & Allergy Association in 2018.

=== Accusations of scientific misconduct ===
On 7 October 2008, eTBLAST, a text similarity search engine on MEDLINE database, noted that 85% of a review paper published by Masoumeh Ebtekar came from several previously published articles. The review paper, on cytokines and air pollution, was published in 2006 in the Iran Journal of Allergy Asthma Immunology (IJAAI) 5 47-56:2006. A couple weeks after the eTBLAST report, Nature covered the story, quoting one of the authors of original papers, (Ian Mudway, a toxicologist at the King's College London) as saying, "the article is a veritable patchwork of other people's work, word for word, grammatical error for grammatical error." Nature also stated that Ebtekar had not replied to its emails. In response, the editor-in-chief of the IJAAI issued a statement saying: "We regret for this duplication that appeared in the journal. We are working with the editors of the JACI journal [the Journal of Allergy and Clinical Immunology, a scholarly periodical that published three of the papers from which Ebtekar had copied] to find the best solution in this regard." In December 2008 Ebtekar's article was retracted.

The issue received some political and public attention in Iran. Ebtekar issued a statement admitting she had made a mistake and apologizing for it, but including a list of complaints such as eTBLAST's failure to inform her of their finding in advance, the fact that the article was a review article she was invited to write for the Journal, and that more than 76 references were given in the text.

=== President of the 12th International Congress of Immunology ===
In 2013 Ebtekar was elected as the President of the 12th International Congress of Immunology. The Congress was held on 29 April 2014. Ebtekar spoke in the opening ceremony and introduced Swiss immunologist Rolf Zinkernagel, the Nobel Laureate for Medicine, as the guest of honour.

== Political career ==
=== Journalism and NGOs ===
In 1981, Ebtekar became the editor-in-chief of the English daily newspaper Kayhan International, selected by Khatami who was then the representative of Ayatollah Khomeini in Kayhan Institute. She served in the newspaper until 1983. In 1991 she co-founded the Institute for Women's Studies and Research. Since 1992, she has been the license holder and managing director of the journal Farzaneh Journal for Women's Studies and Research. Ebtekar was appointed as the Head of Women's NGO Coordinating Office and Vice Head of the National Committee to the Fourth World Conference on Women in Beijing in 1995. Later, she was elected as the President of the Network of Women's NGOs in Iran.

Ebtekar co-founded the Center for Peace and Environment in 2005, a non-governmental organization devoted to the protection of the environment.

Ebtekar served as a moderator in June 2008 at the International "Women, Equality and Peace" Conference held in Oslo, Norway. The conference was sponsored by the Foundation for Dialogue Among Civilizations, Club de Madrid and the Oslo Center.

Ebtekar considered for running in the 2009 presidential election after Guardian Council indicated that there is no "legal restraint" against women doing so. However, she withdrew a few weeks before the election.

Ebtekar published her memoir as the first female Vice President of Iran, entitled the Grapes of Shahrivar on May 3, 2009. She has also published a collection of her essays and speeches on the environment and sustainable development, called Natural Peace. After leaving her government position in 2005, Ebtekar has spoken as inaugural or keynote speaker at many international events.

=== Role in the Islamic Revolution and the Iran hostage crisis (1979–1981) ===
Ebtekar served as spokeswoman for the students in the Iran hostage crisis of 1979, where Muslim Student Followers of the Imam's Line occupied the US Embassy and held 52 Americans hostage for 444 days. Selected because of her good command of English, she made regular appearances on American television as translator and spokeswoman for the students, where she presented the official positions of the students. She was referred to as "Mary" by foreign press, and "Tiger Lily" by the hostages, a play on the translation of "Niloufar". Elaine Sciolino wrote about Ebtekar's own viewpoint: "Asked by an ABC News correspondent one day whether she could see herself picking up a gun and killing the hostages, she replied: 'yes. When I've seen an American gun being lifted up and killing my brothers and sisters in the streets, of course.'" She is said to be remembered by many Americans (hostages such as David Roeder, Barbara Timm, the mother of hostage Kevin Hermening and those who watched her on television) with a great lack of fondness, in part because "her familiarity with America added profound emphasis to her rejection of it." When asked by an American interviewer (Elaine Sciolino) in the late 1990s about her past as spokeswoman for the hostage-takers, why it did not appear on her resume, and why she had changed her name from Niloufar to Masoumeh, Ebtekar "had no apology and made no excuses" about her role, describing the hostage taking as "the best direction that could have been taken" by Iran at the time, but surprised the interviewer with her "chutzpah", insisting that the interviewer "not write much about these things." Ebtekar wrote an account of the embassy takeover with Fred A. Reed titled Takeover in Tehran: The Inside Story of the 1979 U.S. Embassy Capture. Reed attacked the Western media's depiction of Ebtekar: "For twenty years the prevailing 'globalized' version of the embassy capture has cast the students at best as well-intentioned but naive young people manipulated ...and at worst as irresponsible extremists."

She was an advisor of Shahla Habibi, head of the 'Bureau of Women's Affairs' under administration Akbar Hashemi Rafsanjani in the 1990s, and was reportedly the "main driving-force" behind the office.

In the 2012 film Argo, Ebtekar was portrayed by Nikka Far and called only "Tehran Mary" in the credits.

=== Head of the Department of Environment (1997–2005) ===
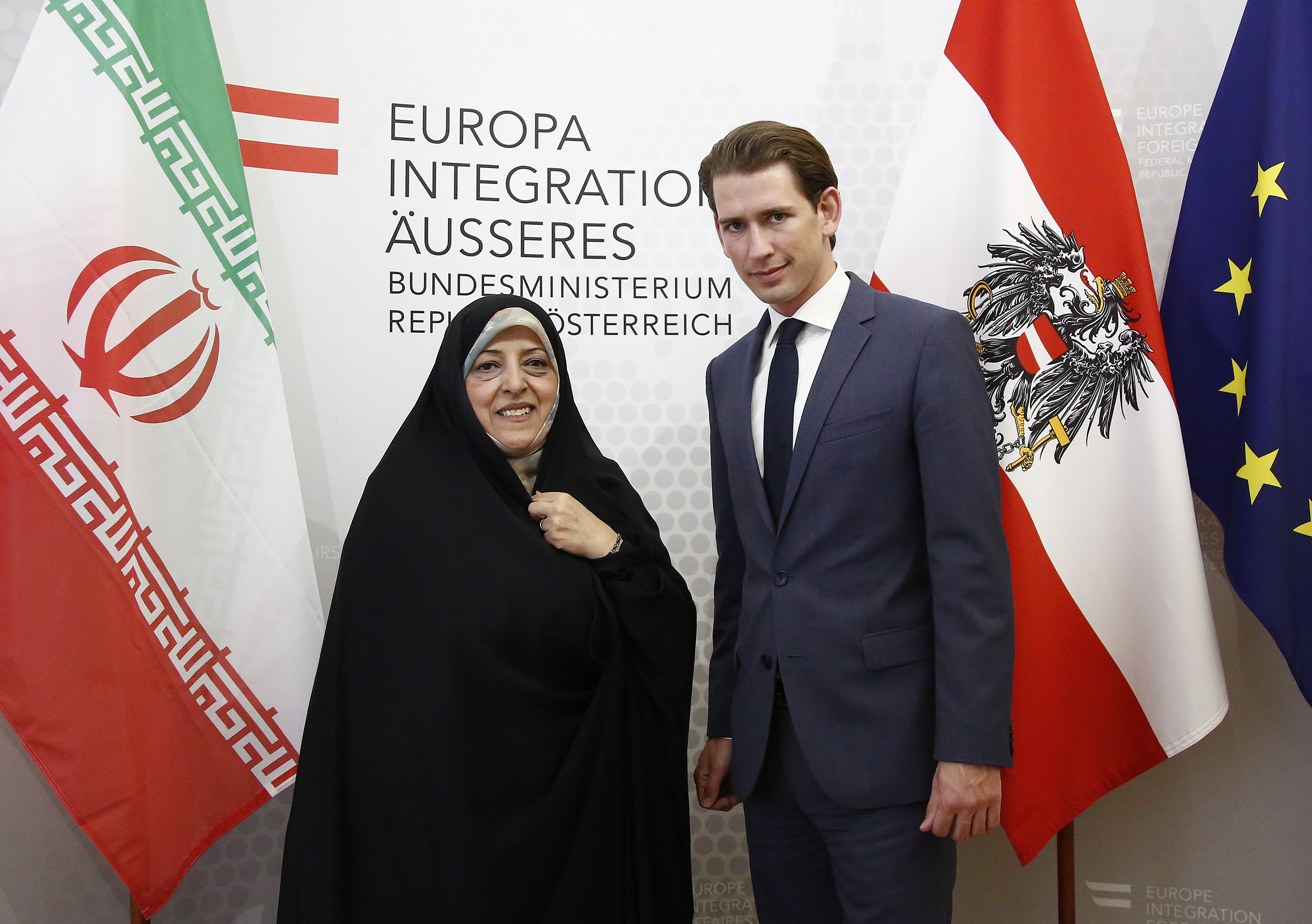
Ebtekar with Austrian foreign minister Sebastian Kurz in 2016

Ebtekar was the first woman to serve as vice-president of Iran when the reformists came to power. Along with Zahra Shojaei, she participated in the first cabinet since the Islamic Revolution to include women. She has been described as a leftist in Mohammad Khatami's alliance. Ebtekar headed the Department of Environment for eight years, introducing major structural, organizational and directional changes enabling a re-engineering of the government body. During her tenure environmental awareness and support for civil society activism in this area was enhanced.

Ebtekar's appointment led to the revelation of her past, and in the US questions were raised about whether President Khatami was aware of "how deeply" the hostage-taking and holding, and anger towards its foremost public defender, "affected both the American government and the American people." Many academics and literary critiques have written and expressed their views on her published memoirs. Following this, "some ambassadors" in Tehran reportedly stated they would no "longer meet with her" and would "discourage official contract with her office."

On International Women's Day in 1998, as vice-president of environmental affairs, she made a speech condemning the oppression of women by the Taliban Movement in Afghanistan. Her performance caused comment by members of the Western news media in attendance as she herself was wearing a chador, a reminder of compulsory hijab in Iran which many in the West view as a violation of women's rights.

In March 2002, Ebtekar was a keynote speaker at the Meeting of Women Leaders on the Environment in Helsinki, sponsored by the Finnish Ministry of the Environment. In September 2002, Ebtekar participated in the World Summit on Sustainable Development, held in Johannesburg, South Africa. In May 2005, she chaired the International Conference on Environment, Peace, and the Dialogue Among Civilizations and Cultures, held in Tehran. This event was organized by Ebtekar's Department of the Environment and also by the United Nations Environment Programme.

=== Member of the Islamic City Council of Tehran (2007–2013) ===
Ebtekar ran for and was elected to the city council of Tehran for the term beginning in 2007, coming in 9th out of 21 candidates, just after Parvin Ahmadinejad, the sister of the Mahmoud Ahmadinejad. She established and heads the Tehran City Council Environment Committee and currently runs 20 working groups on environmental issues.

After election to the City Council of Tehran in early 2007, Ebtekar began a weblog in Persian entitled "EbtekareSabz" under the free blog service Persianblog. In her blog she wrote 430 posts in environmental, political, social and women's issues, posted over 10,000 comments, the blog had one million viewers in 3.5 years. EbtekareSabz, which criticized the policies of the government and supported the reformist movement in Iran, was filtered by the Government once in early 2010 and again in June 2010. and finally obstructed with a judicial verdict in August. Citing the "right to freedom of expression in our constitution" as her incentive, she continued blogging by setting up a new blog.

In 2009, the New York Times described her as "informally represent[ing] the views of many of the former hostage-takers", supporting "engagement with the West" and a renewal of the "original ideals of the revolution, including justice and freedom," which many of her peers believe have been abandoned by the current regime.

In May 2013, Ebtekar signed up as a candidate for Tehran in the 2013 local elections, along with hundreds of reformist candidates. During the vetting process that is conducted by government and Majlis representatives, the majority of candidates, including Ebtekar were disqualified. Ebtekar mentioned her harsh criticism of government policies leading to air pollution and the deterioration of environmental standards as the main reason for her disqualification. Candidates who have objected to their disqualification will be considered for a final round in the Supreme Council for Election Regulation. She was also one of Reformists' candidates as Mayor of Tehran. However, Mohsen Hashemi becomes the final's nominate.

=== Head of the Department of Environment (2013–2017) ===
Ebtekar served as vice president and Head of the Department of Environment during the first term of President Rouhani, 2013–2017. During this period in spite of immense challenges facing Iran's environment, and irrespective of the fierce opposition of rival political and special interests groups, great strides were taken to enhance environmental governance and stewardship. Twelve environmental bills, a strong chapter in the sixth National Development Plan and numerous directives and guidelines were implemented during this period, while national plans to enhance air quality were promoted through strong cross-sectoral, management leading to better air quality trends.

The national Low Carbon Economy Strategy was adopted; the Cabinet adopted its INDC and the Paris Agreement, which the Parliament also adopted. This led to important strides in renewable energy including more than 500 MW of new solar plants and much more underway. Restoration of wetlands according to ecosystem management schemes and local community participation was undertaken leading to revival of Houralazim wetland, designation of Hamoun as a Biosphere reserve and improvement of conditions in Urmia Lake and many other wetlands across Iran.

A major campaign to enhance environment education, inclusion of 56 cases of environment related text and publication of the first textbook "Humans and the Environment" are some of the steps taken in this regard. A significant surge in the quantity and quality of civil society activism was the result of planning for enhanced nongovernmental organization participation in policy and oversight. During this term private sector involvement in the management of protected areas and managing wildlife conservation was promoted through legislation and incentives. Introducing local legislation for management schemes of national parks and protected areas and for wildlife and endangered species conservation schemes for the first time. Nature Rangers enjoyed high quality training and education programs while awareness campaigns led to improvements in their social status. International diplomacy in collaboration with UNEP, UNDP, JICA, UNESCO led to many joint projects including participatory training for local farmers and villagers in Urumia basin area, Conservation of the Cheetah, Second International Seminar on Environment Religion and Culture, First UN Conference on Combating Dust and Sand Storms, Project for Restoration of Anzali Wetland, Project for Coastal Zone Management Projects and many others.

The fifth international Green Film festival was revived, four rounds of International Environment Exhibition, four rounds of Green Industry Competition and Four Rounds of the National Environment Award was convened during this term. 20 Bilateral and multilateral MOUs were signed and implemented leading to more than 50 technical and educational workshops and sessions. Nationwide campaigns on "no to plastics", "reduction of waste", "and energy conservation", "no to food waste" and many others were supported and promoted. The National Committee on Sustainable Development was transformed into an efficient cross sectoral body to promote and monitor sustainability indicators at the national level.

=== Vice President for Women and Family Affairs (2017–2021) ===
After Hassan Rouhani elected as President of Iran, Ebtekar who supported Rouhani openly, was one of the candidates for the Ministry of Science. However, she was appointed as Head of Environmental Protection Organization on 10 September 2013, a position she had formerly served for eight years under Mohammad Khatami. On 1 August 2017, Ebtekar announced that she will be leaving her current position after the end of the first Rouhani government. She was appointed as Vice President for Women and Family Affairs in second Rouhani government. During the four years of Ebtekar's tenure the following measures were taken: 1) Adoption of 176 indicators for Gender Equity in the National Headquarters for Women and Family 2) Based on local Status of women's statistics and Gender Equity Indicators each of the 31 Provinces of Iran adopted a provincial Plan for Women and Family Advancement 3) Progress on the advancement of Gender Equity Indicators and provincial plans was monitored through an online monitoring system. 4) In 2017 President Rouhani set a 30% quota for women in decision-making positions in his government as proposed by Shahindokht Molaverdi< the previous Vice President, thereby initiating a process of educating/ training and appointing women from medium to high level positions in the government. During a period of four years 8400 women were appointed: 2 as Vice Presidents, 97 as deputy ministers, 17 as deputy governors, 10 local governors, many as executive directors and managers in the administration. During this term 5 women Ambassadors were appointed for the first time. As a result of this policy, the percentage of women in decision-making positions rose from 5% in 2013 to 25% in 2021. 5) During this period 12 legal bills for the advancement of women were drafted, sent for adoption to the Cabinet or adopted in the Cabinet and sent as a bill for the Majlis or adopted ultimately as a law. Among the most important was the bill on Prevention of Violence Against Women which was adopted by the government of Rouhani and sent to the Majlis to be initially adopted with changes about 3 years later in the Parliament and still pending final adoption. The bill entitled Support for Children and Juneviles was supported by the government of Rouhani and urgency for its adoption in the Majlis was requested resulting in the ultimate adoption of this law in 2021. Another bill known as the Roumina Bill was presented by Ebtekar to the Cabinet and adopted to introduce more severe penalties for fathers who kill their children. In addition, a bill allowing mothers to manage financial affairs of their children's bank accounts was presented and adopted in the cabinet and sent for final adoption to the Majlis. During this term for the first time, more than 900 by-laws and regulations related to women and family, some dating back several decades were codified, nullified or endorsed and finally adopted in the Cabinet.

During the COVID-19 pandemic in Iran, Iranian state media announced that Ebtekar had been diagnosed with COVID-19. The infection was described as mild and she was not admitted to hospital. On 11 March 2020, Ebtekar tweeted that she had recovered from the virus.

== Awards and honours ==
Ebtekar was named one of the seven 2006 Champions of the Earth by the United Nations Environment Program as a prominent and "inspirational" environmental leader who has made an impact at policy level in a region of the world. Ebtekar said that she believes the award was a team effort, earned by the scholars and experts that she assembled in her Department of the Environment. She names President Khatami as instrumental in stressing the importance of environmental initiatives. She was also named as one of 50 environmental leaders by The Guardian newspaper on 5 January 2008; the only Iranian or Muslim woman in the list.

In the 2012 and 2023 editions of The Muslim500 Ebtekar has been named as one of the 500 most influential Muslims in the world. Under the political section of this yearbook, Ebtekar is described as "a considerable force in the reformist movement in Iran".

On 24 January 2014, Ebtekar was awarded the Energy Globe Foundation Honorary Lifetime Achievement Award in Tehran.

On 29 November 2014, Masoumeh Ebtekar won the Italian Minerva Award for her scientific achievements and successful career in political arena. Minerva Award is a nongovernmental award established in 2009 in the name of Madame Anna Maria Mammoliti, Italian journalist and social activist after her death. The Minerva Award has been presented to famous figures active in different social, economic, political and cultural fields, and the receivers have been mainly women.

In May 2016 Ebtekar was awarded an Honorary Doctorate Degree in Political Science by the Hankuk University of Foreign Studies, Seoul, Korea.

== Published works ==
In 2010, Ebtekar contributed to Moral Ground a testimony of over eighty visionaries—theologians and religious leaders, scientists, elected officials, business leaders, naturalists, activists, and writers—to present a diverse and compelling call to honor our individual and collective moral responsibility to our planet. In her essay entitled "Peace and Sustainability Depend on the Spiritual and the Feminine" Ebtekar provides her views on the interrelated nature of peace and sustainable development. She also took part in a project to develop a book entitled Women, Power and Politics in 21st Century Iran. The book, published in 2012 by Ashgate, provides an objective perspective on the conditions of women in Iran. Chapter 10 titled "Women and the Environment" has been authored by Massoumeh Ebtekar. In 2011 Ebtekar also co-authored a chapter in the book Stem Cells and Cancer Stem Cells published by Springer. Chapter 3 "Characteristics of Cord Blood Cells" is a review performed by a team of researchers in Iran.

== See also ==
- List of female members of the Cabinet of Iran
- List of Iranian women politicians
