= Shahla Habibi =

Iranian politician (1958–2017)

Head of Office of Women's Affairs
- In office 28 December 1991 – 18 October 1997
- President: Akbar Hashemi Rafsanjani
- Preceded by: Office created
- Succeeded by: Zahra Shojaei

Personal details
- Born: 1958 Kermanshah, Iran
- Died: 6 September 2017 (aged 58–59) Tehran, Iran

Shahla Habibi (1958—6 September 2017) was Iran's Presidential Advisor on Women's Affairs from 1991 to 1997. She was former member of central council of Islamic Coalition Party.

== Career ==
=== Presidential advisor ===
In 28 December 1991, President Rafsanjani appointed Habibi as Iran's Presidential Advisor on Women's Affairs.

=== Female Representation of the Iranian Government ===
Habibi's position would later become a cabinet position under President Khatami. This post was later held by Zahra Shojaei under President Khatami, and by Nasrin Soltankhah during President Mahmoud Ahmadinejad's administration.

=== Islamic Republic of Iran Women's News Agency ===
The Islamic Republic of Iran Women's News Agency (IWNA) was created in the 1990s to meet the information needs of Iranian women. She became the IWNA Director.

Government offices
| Vacant Title last held by Mahnaz Afkhami as Minister for Women's Affairs | Head of Bureau of Women's Affairs; 1991–1997 | Succeeded by Zahra Shojaei as Head of Center for Women's Participation Affairs |
