= Isa Kalantari =

Iranian politician

- عیسی کلانتری
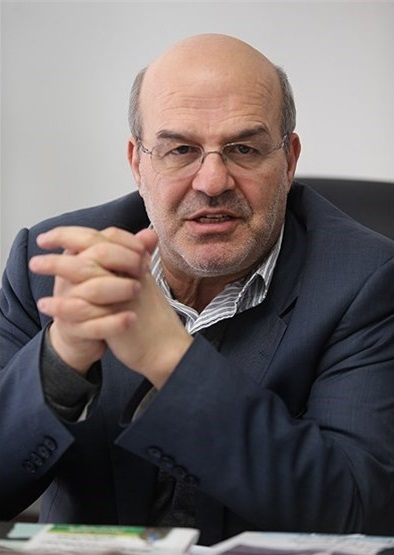

Vice President of Iran Head of Department of Environment
- In office 13 August 2017 – 3 October 2021
- President: Hassan Rouhani
- Preceded by: Masoumeh Ebtekar
- Succeeded by: Ali Salajegheh

Minister of Agriculture
- In office 20 September 1988 – 14 January 2001
- President: Ali Khamenei; Akbar Hashemi Rafsanjani; Mohammad Khatami
- Prime Minister: Mir Hossein Mousavi
- Preceded by: Abbas Ali Zali
- Succeeded by: Mahmoud Hojjati (Merged in Jihad of Construction Ministry)

Personal details
- Born: Isa Kalantari; 1952 (age 73–74) Marand, East Azerbaijan Province, Iran
- Party: Executives of Construction Party
- Education: Urmia University; University of Nebraska–Lincoln; Iowa State University
- Occupation: Politician
- Profession: Agricultural engineer

Isa Kalantari (Persian: عیسی کلانتری, born 1952 in Marand, East Azerbaijan) is an Iranian politician and former vice president, former head of Urmia Lake Restoration Program, and the former head of Department of Environment, serving from 2017 to 2021. He served as minister of agriculture in last year of Khamenei's presidency, in both terms of Rafsanjani's presidency and also in first term of President Khatami.

Isa Kalantari lost his elder brother, Mousa, in Hafte Tir bombing on 28 June 1981.

He has a BSc degree of agriculture from Urmia University, MSc of Physiology-Biochemistry from University of Nebraska–Lincoln, and PhD in agricultural physiology from Iowa State University. He was a member of the Center for Strategic Research in the Expediency Discernment Council. In 2001, he founded Iran's House of Farmers and has been serving as its director since then.

== See also ==
- Mosa Kalantari
- Hamidreza Moghaddamfar
