= Farzaneh (magazine) =

Iranian feminist magazine

- Editor-in-chief: Mahboubeh Abbasgholizadeh
- Categories: Islamic feminist magazine; Women's magazine
- Frequency: Biannual; Irregular
- Publisher: Mahboubeh Abbasgholizadeh; Masoumeh Ebtekar
- Founded: 1993
- First issue: Fall 1993
- Country: Iran
- Based in: Tehran
- Language: Persian; English

Farzaneh (Persian: فرزانه, lit. 'Wise') is an Islamic feminist magazine that supports modernist views to advocate change in the lives of women in Iran. It is subtitled Journal for Women's Studies and Research. It has been in circulation since Fall 1993 with some intervals.

== History and profile ==
Farzaneh was launched in 1993 as a biannual publication. The first issue appeared in Fall 1993. The publishers are Mahboubeh Abbasgholizadeh and Masoumeh Ebtekar. The latter is also license holder of Farzaneh. As of 2001 Mahboubeh Abbasgholizadeh was the editor-in-chief. Zahra Ommi is one of the editors of the magazine.

Farzaneh publishes both Persian and English language articles which mostly indicate Prophet Mohammad's respect for women who assumed various political and religious roles during that period. The magazine argues that the approach of the Quran towards women and the present interpretations about women in Islam are not compatible. It functions as a connection point between decision makers and women activists. Sanam Vakil stated in 2011 that following the appointment of Masoumeh Ebtekar as a deputy to Mohammad Khatami's Organization for Environmental Protection the frequency of the magazine became irregular.
