= Mohammad Taghi Pourmohammadi =

Iranian Ayatollah

- محمدتقی پورمحمدی
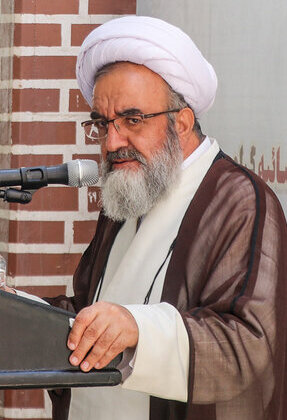
- Mohammad Taghi Pourmohammadi during a ceremony commemorating the people killed in 7th Tir Bombing in Tabriz.

Member of the Assembly of Experts
- Incumbent
- Assumed office 15 December 2006
- Constituency: East Azerbaijan
- Majority: 570,445 (5th)
- Majority: 359,839 (4th)

Personal details
- Born: 1956 (age 69–70) Marand, East Azerbaijan
- Education: Qom Hawza

Ayatollah Mohammad Taghi Pourmohammadi (Persian: محمدتقی پورمحمدی, was born 1956 in Marand, East Azerbaijan) is an Iranian Shiite Muslim cleric and politician. He is a member of the 4th, 5th and 6th Assembly of Experts from electorate East Azerbaijan. Pourmohammadi won with 359,839 votes.
