= Mohammad-Javad Mohammadizadeh =

Vice President and Head of Environmental Protection Organization of Iran

- محمدجواد محمدی‌زاده
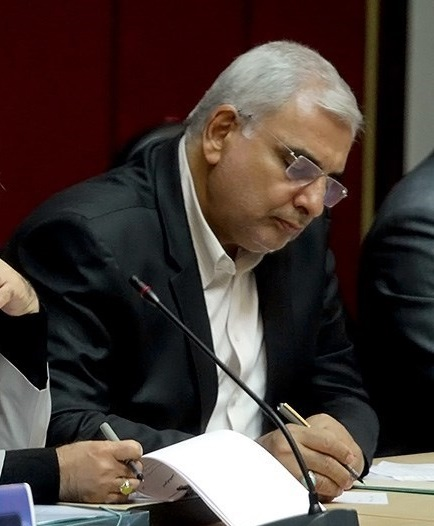
- Mohammad-Javad Mohammadizadeh

Vice President of Iran Head of Department of Environment
- In office 31 August 2009 – 10 September 2013
- President: Mahmoud Ahmadinejad
- Preceded by: Fatemeh Javadi
- Succeeded by: Masoumeh Ebtekar

Governor of Razavi Khorasan province
- In office 28 September 2005 – 31 August 2009
- President: Mahmoud Ahmadinejad
- Preceded by: Hassan Rasouli
- Succeeded by: Mahmoud Salahi

Governor of Lorestan province
- In office 4 January 1994 – 18 September 1997
- President: Akbar Hashemi Rafsanjani
- Preceded by: Ahmad Entezari
- Succeeded by: Hassan Rasouli

Personal details
- Born: 1951 (age 74–75) Dezful, Iran

Mohammad-Javad Mohammadizadeh (Persian: محمدجواد محمدی‌زاده; born 1951) is an Iranian politician who was vice president and Head of Environmental Protection Organization of Iran from August 2009 when he replaced Fatemeh Javadi until September 2013. He was formerly Governor of Razavi Khorasan province and Lorestan province.
