= Afkham =

Afkham is a surname. Notable people with the surname include:

- David Afkham (born 1983), German conductor
- Marzieh Afkham (born 1962/63), Iranian diplomat

== See also ==
- Afkhami
