= Domestic violence in Iran =

Domestic violence in Iran is a form of violence expressed by one partner or partners against another partner or partners in the content of an intimate relationship in Iran.

== National and political culture ==
In Iran, domestic relations between couples are regulated by the Civil Code, which constructs marriage as a hierarchic institution where the husband has authority over his wife. Article 1105 reads: "In relations between husband and wife; the position of the head of the family is the exclusive right of the husband". The husband is obligated to maintain his wife, but this obligation ceases to exist if the wife does not perform her duties: Article 1108 states: "If the wife refuses to fulfil duties of a wife without legitimate excuse, she will not be entitled to the cost of maintenance".

The nature of domestic violence is complicated by both a national culture and an authoritative state that supports control, oppression and violence against women. "The government does so by promoting fundamentalist ideas of women as properties of men. It does so by setting up an unequal legal system and not punishing assault even when it has resulted in severe injury or, at times, even death. The conversation of domestic violence then cannot be simply domestic but begins to take the shape of a systematic violence, fueled by tradition, ignited by religion, encouraged by the dominant authoritarian state, and empowered by poverty and illiteracy."

At the heart of the issue is the belief, rooted in common law, that men are responsible for their household affairs, especially the treatment of family members, and should not be subject to intervention by the government.

Iranian feminists believe that women's issues must be further investigated since so many women are facing domestic violence in Iran. "Religious intellectuals have responded by engaging in reluctant analysis of the way the woman question poses itself in the Iranian context. So far, their analyses fail to take into account the gender implications of the struggle against absolutism and traditional authority. However, the dynamic interaction of the reform project with the demands and aspirations of various sectors of Iranian public life will not allow the issue to rest here. Religious intellectuals, in their attempt to recreate essential religious truth in the form of new intellectual concepts and systems, will increasingly have to deal with systemic gender inequalities in a more systematic manner."

There has been some pushback to feminist efforts to reduce domestic violence in Iran by some more conservative elements of Iranian society. For example, the women's Basij leader, Minu Aslani, opposed efforts to fight domestic abuse in Iran, because she felt that it threatened Iran's traditional values. Many people in positions of power hold similar opinions, viewing feminist efforts to achieve gender equality as a threat to Islamic principles.

== Incidence of domestic abuse in Iran ==
In his article "'Domestic Violence against Single and Married Women in Iranian Society ", Azad Moradian' quoted a National Coalition Against Domestic Violence statement regarding the nature of domestic violence:

"The Census Bauru in Iran, an official government agency, has precluded international organizations from performing studies of domestic violence in Iran and has never conducted their own study of violence against women".

The prevalence of domestic violence has been cited as a cause of high rates of suicide, mostly through self-immolation, among Kurdish women in Iran.

=== World Health Organization study ===
A World Health Organization (WHO) study in Babol found that within the previous year, 15.0% of wives had been physically abused, 42.4% had been sexually abused and 81.5% had been psychologically abused (to various degrees) by their husbands, blaming low income, young age, unemployment and low education.

=== 2004 domestic violence study ===
In 2004, Dr. Ghazi Tabatabaei, a renowned Iranian sociologist, led a study of domestic violence for a joint project undertaken by the Women's Center for Presidential Advisory, the Ministry of Higher Education and The Interior Ministry. Other noted scholars, professionals, psychologists and socialists participated in the study of the capital cities in Iran's 28 provinces that resulted after several years in 32 volumes of results. The findings from questionnaires included the following areas of focus: violence towards women and children, marriages and remarriages, divorce, the effect of education and work on violence and family issues.

The 32 volume findings are available only to scholars and researchers at the Center for Research in Tehran and have been shared with governmental lawmakers and agencies. The study of Iran, a diverse country of many ethnical and cultural communities, resulted in varied results by province, and particularly different the farther that women lived from Tehran, the capital of Iran. This could be attributed to the lack of higher education, economics, and the dominance of religion.

From the study:

- 53% of married women in Iran are subjected to some kind of domestic violence in the first year of their marriage, either by their husbands or by their in-laws.
- All married women who were participants in this study in Iran have experienced 7.4% of the 9 categories of abuse.
- The more children in a family, the more likely domestic violence will occur towards women.
- 9.63% of women in the study reported wishing their husbands would die, as a result of the abuse they have experienced.

9 Main Categories of Domestic Violence
Main category of abuse	Statistic	Comments
Verbal abuse	Not provided in the article abstract.	
Physical abuse	8.37% of married women in the study reported having experienced severe physical abuse.	
Emotional abuse	52% of married women in the study reported having experienced emotional abuse.	
Economical abuse, such as: refusing her right to have a job, restricting her opportunities, taking her income, restricting allowance	Not provided in the article abstract.	
Legal abuse, for example: a husband has a legal right in Iran to take his wife's full rights away, by restricting her from traveling, and going out of the house	Not provided in the article abstract.	
Educational abuse: restricting the right to go to school	7.27% of married women in the study reported having experienced educational and career restrictions.	Women who have a higher education and are career women experience a lower level of domestic violence.
Neglect by restricting food or not feeding/adequately providing for a family	Not provided in the article abstract.	
Sexual abuse, including marital rape, forced pregnancy, forced abortions, restricting wife's access to health care and birth control.	2.10% of married women in the study reported having experienced sexual abuse; however, this number could be severely under reported due to the taboo surrounding the topic. Of the women who reported sexual abuse, 5.2% reported having a miscarriage due to severe beatings by her husband.	
Honor killings, murder, and femicide	5.23% of married women in the study reported having experienced near death violence or feared for their lives due to domestic violence.	The chief of police in Iran stated that 40% of all murders in Iran happen due to domestic violence and that 50% of all women who are murdered are done so by someone in their immediate family and mostly from the woman's home.

=== 2025 ===
In June 2025, vice president of Iran for women and family affairs Zahra Behrouz Azar said that in Iran the rate of violence and spousal abuse against women was 30 times higher than the rate against men.

== Education and activism ==
Since about 1994, there have been an overwhelming number of Masters' and PH.D theses written about women's issues due by women in higher education, including universities in Iran. Because the papers have been unable to result in change or improvements, many universities are now discouraging theses based on Iranian women's issues.

Moradian wrote in 2009 that "Human rights organizations, political/humanitarian oppositional groups and advocacy groups for women were the only voices that acknowledged the existence of this widespread phenomenon in Iran and fought for changes in law and education within communities."

Ramezan Shojaei Kiyasari, Fatema Alia, members of the Iranian parliament, represented Iran at the "Regional Seminar for Asian Parliaments" seminar on 'Preventing and responding to violence against women and girls: From legislation to effective enforcement' held in New Delhi, India in 2011. Mrs. Fatemeh Alia announced that new laws related to violence against women were placed on Iran's parliament agenda.

== Laws ==
Existing laws (Iranian Code of Criminal Procedure articles 42, 43, 66) intend to prohibit violence in the form of kidnapping, gender-based harassment, abuse of pregnant women and "crimes against rights and responsibilities within the family structure," but due to cultural and political culture do not protect women, prosecute their abusers and provide services to victims.

=== Proposed laws ===
Laws to better enforce existing laws and protect women against violence were placed on the agenda before the Iranian parliament the week ending 16 September 2011, focusing on both protection and prevention of violence against women, including focus on human trafficking, better protection and services for abuse victims, rehabilitation (especially concerning domestic abuse) and better processes to manage questioning of female offenders. One of the keys to ultimate success is altering community cultural views regarding the use of violence against women.

== See also ==
- Human rights in Iran
