= Abbas Sami'i =

Politician

Deputy Prime Minister Head of Environment Organization
- In office February 1979 – 23 August 1979
- Prime Minister: Mehdi Bazargan
- Preceded by: Manouchehr Feyli
- Succeeded by: Taghi Ebtekar

Personal details
- Born: Tehran, Iran
- Party: Freedom Movement of Iran (1961–1979)
- Cabinet: Bazargan Cabinet

Abbas Sami'i (Persian: عباس سمیعی) was an Iranian politician who held office as the third head of the Environmental Protection Organization.

Sami'i came from a bazaari family. A co-founder of Freedom Movement of Iran, he was considered among the main figures of the party's more secular faction and had socialist tendencies, like Rahim Ata'i.
