= Zahra Shojaei =

Iranian politician (1956–2024)

Zahra Shojaie
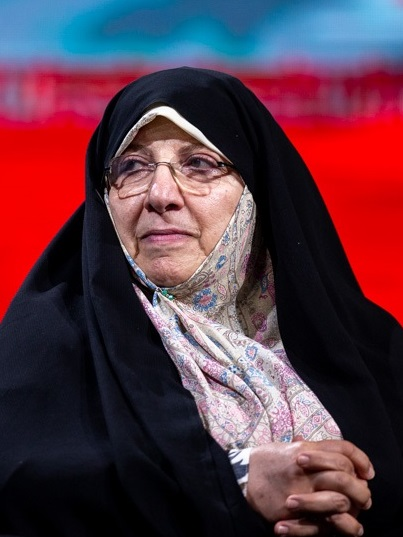
- Shojaie in 2021

Head of Center for Women's Participation Affairs
- In office 18 October 1997 – 25 September 2005
- President: Mohammad Khatami
- Preceded by: Shahla Habibi
- Succeeded by: Nasrin Soltankhah

Personal details
- Born: 24 June 1956 Tehran, Iran
- Died: 26 March 2024 (aged 67) Tehran, Iran
- Children: 2 daughters
- Education: University of Tehran; Islamic Azad University; National Defense University

Zahra Shojaie / Shojaei (Persian: زهرا شجاعی; 24 June 1956 – 26 March 2024) was an Iranian politician. A major advocate of women's rights in Iran, she was the advisor on women's affairs under President Khatami, and as such a member of his cabinet from 1997 to 2005.

== Center for Women's Participation ==
In 1997, Khatami created the Center for Women's Participation, which then became the main institution responsible for handling women's affairs in the country, affiliated with the presidency. When Ahmadinejad took the presidency in 2005, he renamed it Center for Women and Family Affairs (Markaz-e Omor-e Zanan va Khanevadeh Riasat-e Jomhuri).

== Appointment to Iranian Cabinet ==
President Khatami appointed Zahra Shojaie as his advisor on women's affairs (a position formerly held by Shahla Habibi) and the head of the Center for Women's Participation. This appointment made her a member of the Iranian Presidential Cabinet. Zahra Shojaie, along with Masoumeh Ebtekar, participated in the first cabinet since the Islamic Revolution to include women.

== Transition ==
With the election of President Mahmoud Ahmadinejad in 2005, Nasrin Soltankhah was appointed to Shojaei's post. The center was renamed Center for Women and Family Affairs, as opposed to Center for Women's Participation as it was called under Khatami. Participation was no longer a policy emphasis.

== Death ==
Shojaie died on 26 March 2024, at the age of 67.

Government offices
Preceded by Shahla Habibi as Head of Bureau of Women's Affairs	Head of Center for Women's Participation Affairs; 1997–2005	Succeeded by Nasrin Soltankhah as Head of Center for Women and Family Affairs
