= Ganjali Sabahi =

Iranian writer (1906–1990)

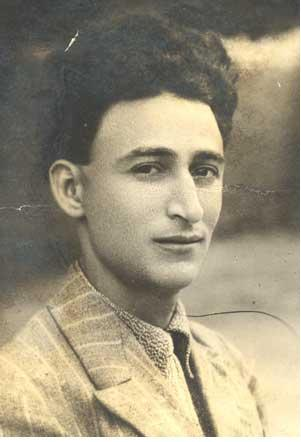
- Born: 1906; Marand, Qajar Iran
- Died: 6 September 1990 (aged 83–84); Tehran, Iran
- Occupation: writer

Ganjali Sabahi (Persian: گنجعلی صباحی; 1906 – 6 September 1990) was an Iranian writer of Azerbaijani literature. He was a contemporary writer of Azerbaijan, that were writing in Azerbaijani language.
