= Fatemeh Javadi =

Iranian paleontologist

- فاطمه جوادی

Vice President of Iran Head of Department of Environment
- In office 7 September 2005 – 31 August 2009
- President: Mahmoud Ahmadinejad
- Preceded by: Masoumeh Ebtekar
- Succeeded by: Mohammad-Javad Mohammadizadeh

Personal details
- Born: 1959 (age 65–66); Qom, Iran

Fatemeh Javadi (Persian: فاطمه جوادی, also Romanized as “Fāteme(h) Javādī”; born 1959) is a conservative Iranian politician who was Vice President of Iran from 2005 to 2009. She is the niece of Ayatollah Javadi Amoli.

== Education ==
Javadi holds a doctorate in geology and is currently teaching at the University of Shiraz in southern Iran.

== Career and policies ==
After the election of Mahmoud Ahmadinejad as President of Iran, Javadi was appointed Vice-President and Head of the Department of the Environment (DoE). Javadi replaced Masoumeh Ebtekar, who held the post under Mohammad Khatami. Javadi's main responsibility was to oversee the state Environmental Protection Organization. She and Nasrin Soltankhah were the only women in the cabinet.

Javadi articulated some of her plans for the DoE. She stated that she would work towards the goals of institutionalizing the culture of protecting the environment, boosting public awareness about environmental considerations on the basis of sustainable development, holding environmental training courses from kindergarten all the way up to the universities, and focusing the DoE on the facilitation of research.

In November 2007, Javadi organized a circus in Pardisan Park in Tehran. She was criticized by Iranian NGOs and activists for the circus's abuse of animals.

When Ahmadinejad was re-elected as president in 2009, Javadi was replaced by Mohammad-Javad Mohammadizadeh.
