= Department of Environment (Iran) =

Iranian government agency

- سازمان حفاظت محیط زیست; Sazman-e Hefazât-e Mohit-e Zist

Agency overview
- Formed: 1956
- Headquarters: Tehran, Iran
- Agency executive: Shina Ansari, Head of Department
- Website: doe.ir

The Iranian Department of Environment (Persian: سازمان حفاظت محیط زیست) is a governmental organization under the supervision of the president. It is responsible for matters related to safeguarding the environment.

The origins of the department can be traced back to the Hunting Club of Iran, established in 1956. Later, it developed into an organization overseeing hunting and fishing activities in the country. In 1971, the organization changed its name to its current one, and notably has hosted the Ramsar Convention on Wetlands of International Importance in the city of Ramsar on the same year.

Today the organization maintains a list of four types of protected areas as follows:

- 23 National Parks, including Kavir, Touran, and Tandooreh National Parks,
- 32 National Natural Monuments, including Mounts Damavand, Sabalan, Taftan, and Alam-Kuh,
- 37 Wildlife Refuges, including Hamoon and Miandasht Wildlife Refuges, and
- 117 Protected Areas, including Mounts Dena and Alvand, Lake Parishan, Jajrood, Karkheh, and Haraz Rivers, and Arasbaran.

== History and Mission ==
The Iranian Department of Environment (DOE) traces its roots to the Hunting Club of Iran, founded in 1956 to regulate hunting practices and protect wildlife. Over time, the increasing awareness of environmental challenges led to a broader mandate. In 1967, the club evolved into the Game Council, and just four years later, in 1971, the modern Department of Environment was established. That same year, Iran hosted the historic Ramsar Convention on Wetlands of International Importance, positioning the DOE as a pioneer in international environmental governance in the Global South.

Throughout its history, the DOE has been closely tied to the Iranian political structure. Its head is appointed as a vice president and member of the Cabinet, reflecting the department’s elevated position in national decision-making. The DOE has been led by a diverse range of directors, including scientists, technocrats, and former military officers, indicating shifts in political priorities and approaches to environmental governance.

A key figure in the institutionalization of environmental governance in Iran was Eskandar Firouz, who is widely regarded as the architect of the country’s modern environmental system. As the founding director of the Department of Environment, Firouz played a central role in transitioning the Hunting Club into a national agency with legal authority to protect natural areas, regulate hunting, and oversee environmental planning. His scientific background and global perspective helped shape Iran’s early environmental policies, including the drafting of laws that placed Iran among the first countries in the region to adopt modern conservation frameworks. Firouz’s efforts were supported by Prince Abdolreza Pahlavi, the brother of Mohammad Reza Shah and head of the Hunting Club, whose political influence and interest in wildlife conservation were instrumental in securing royal support for the creation of the Department. This collaboration between Firouz’s expertise and Abdolreza’s political backing laid the foundation for the DOE’s formal establishment in 1971.

The mission of the DOE is to protect and improve the environment of Iran for present and future generations. This includes the conservation of biodiversity, management of natural resources, environmental education, pollution control, and coordinating with international environmental agreements. The department also oversees the designation and management of Iran’s protected areas, including national parks, wildlife refuges, and natural monuments, and works to ensure sustainable development in harmony with ecological principles.

In recent years, the DOE has emphasized climate change adaptation, dust storm mitigation, water resource protection, and community participation in conservation. As of the 2020s, there has also been a growing focus on environmental justice, the role of local communities, and integrating traditional ecological knowledge into national environmental strategies.

== Organization ==
The Department of Environment (DOE) is led by the Head of the Department. The head of the DOE is at the same time, vice president in environmental affairs, a member of the cabinet and is directly reporting to the President. The current head of DOE is Shina Ansari.

The Department of Environment is organized into several specialized divisions, including Natural Environment, Human Environment, Marine Environment, Legal and Parliamentary Affairs, Management Development, and Public Education and Participation. Each of Iran’s provinces hosts a regional DOE office (referred to as “General Directorate”), which supervises county-level offices and national park stations within its territory.

== Leadership History ==
Since its transformation into the Department of Environment in 1971, the DOE has been led by a series of individuals with varying backgrounds. The following is a list of past Heads of the DOE:

- Eskandar Firouz (1972–1977) – Considered the founder of Iran’s modern environmental administration
- Manouchehr Feyli (1977–1979)
- Abbas Sami'i (1979)
- Taghi Ebtekar (1979–1981)
- Reza-Hossein Mirza-Taheri (1981–1985)
- Hadi Manafi (1985–1997)
- Masoumeh Ebtekar (1997–2005; 2013–2017) – First woman vice president
- Fatemeh Javadi (2005–2009)
- Mohammad-Javad Mohammadizadeh (2009–2013)
- Isa Kalantari (2017–2021)
- Ali Salajegheh (2021–2024)
- Shina Ansari (2024–present) – Current head, with a background in environmental administration

== See also ==
- Economy of Iran
- Environment of Iran
- Government of Iran
- Wildlife of Iran
