= Foundation for Iranian Studies =

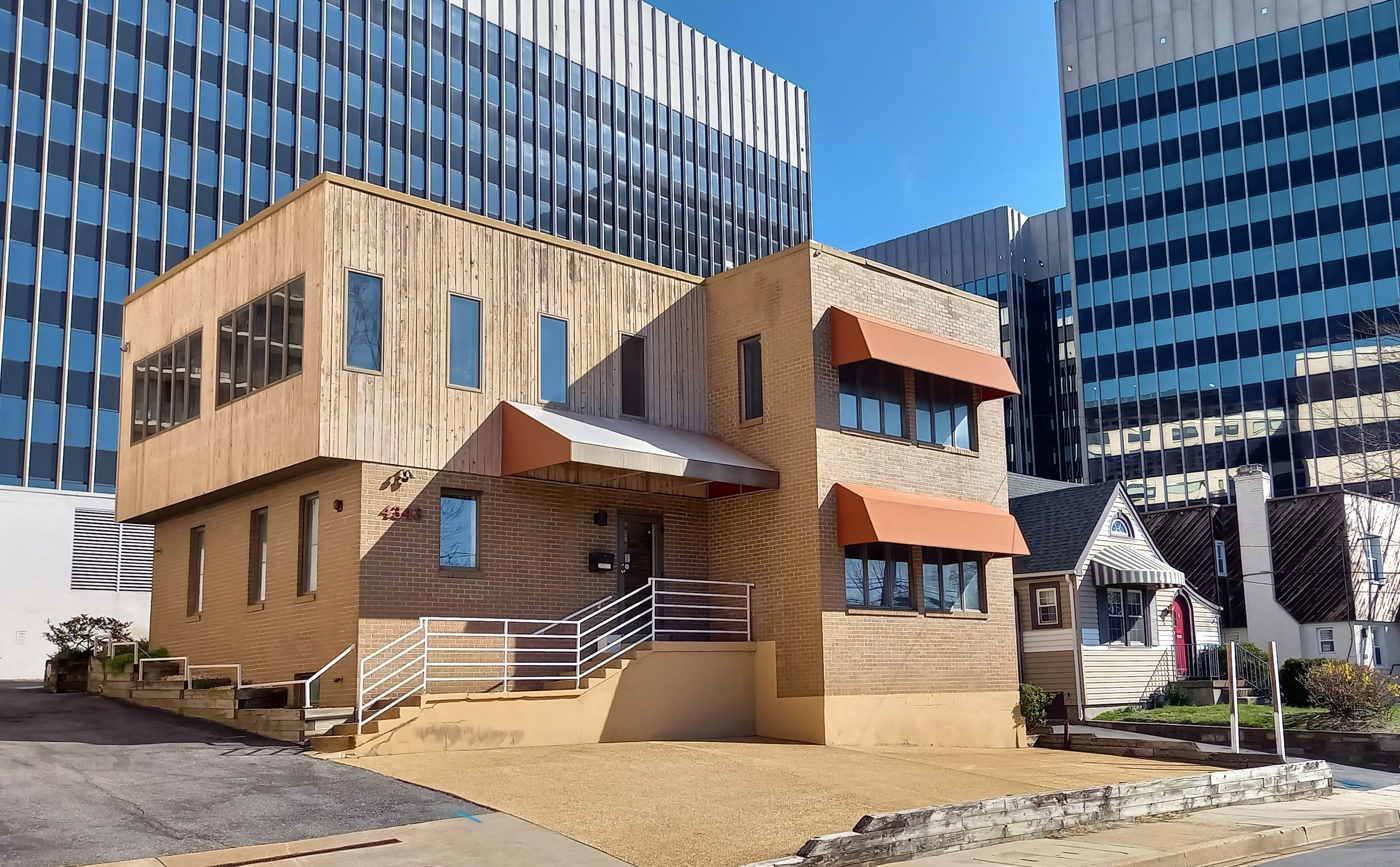
- Foundation for Iranian Studies in Maryland
- Established: 1981
- Founder: Gholam Reza Afkhami
- Type: Nonprofit
- Legal status: 501(c)(3) organization
- Headquarters: 4343 Montgomery Ave., Bethesda, Maryland, U.S.
- Executive director: Mahnaz Afkhami
- Website: http://fis-iran.org/en

The Foundation for Iranian Studies (FIS) is an American non-profit institution dedicated to educating the public about Persia and modern Iran. Princess Ashraf Pahlavi, Shah Mohammad Reza Pahlavi's sister, funded the founding of FIS in1981, just after the Iranian Revolution. Thus, the foundation especially focused on preserving pre-revolutionary history and culture. Since 1982 they have hosted an oral history program.

The foundation was originally located in Washington DC, and later moved to Maryland. The mission is to preserve, study, and transmit Persian/Iranian cultural heritage; to study contemporary issues within Iranian government and society; and to point to the probable social, economic, political, and military directions Iran may take in the 21st century. The foundation received financial support from Princess Ashraf Pahlavi. It has organized various Persian cultural events in collaboration with American universities, museums and academic institutions in the United States, notable partners include Georgetown University, National Museum of Asian Art, Society of Iranian Studies, Pacific Museum, Middle East Studies Association, and others.

== Oral History project ==
In the early 1980s, the Foundation for Iranian Studies launched its Oral History Project to preserve the memories and information of pre-revolutionary Persian artists, politicians, diplomats, etc. This project was managed by Gholam Reza Afkhami.

The director of the foundation is Mahnaz Afkhami, who previously served as the Minister of Women's Affairs in Iran before the Iranian Revolution.

== Iran Nameh ==
From 1982 until 2016, the Foundation for Iranian Studies published the Persian-language journal Iran Nameh, which was edited by Jalal Matini.

The foundation has also published over twenty books in both English and Persian. It has also offered a prize to the best PhD dissertations on Persian/Iranian culture and art.

== See also ==
- Iranian studies
- Iranology Foundation

== Sources ==
- Foundation for Iranian Studies, Dissertation of the Year Awards
- Foundation for Iranian Studies' publications in WorldCat
- C-span: Gholam Reza Afkhami of Foundation for Iranian Studies
