= Zohreh Tabibzadeh-Nouri =

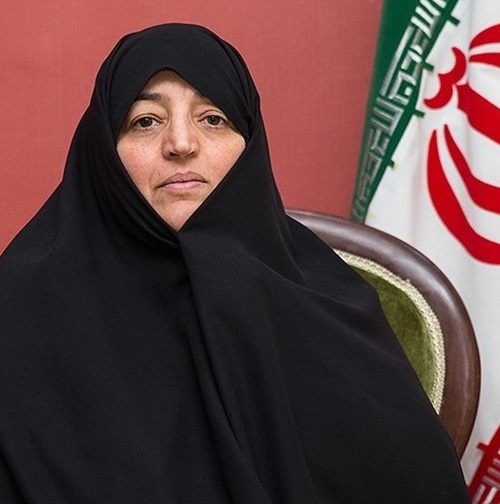

Member of the Parliament of Iran
- In office 28 May 2012 – 28 May 2016
- Constituency: Tehran, Rey, Shemiranat and Eslamshahr
- Majority: 321,698 (28.55%)

Head of Center for Women and Family Affairs
- In office 12 February 2006 – 14 November 2009
- President: Mahmoud Ahmadinejad
- Preceded by: Nasrin Soltankhah
- Succeeded by: Maryam Mojtahedzadeh

Personal details
- Born: c. 1960 (age 65–66) Tehran, Iran
- Party: Front of Islamic Revolution Stability
- Other political affiliations: Office for Strengthening Unity (1979–1982)
- Education: Shahid Beheshti University of Medical Sciences
- Profession: Dentist

Zohreh Tabibzadeh-Nouri (Persian: زهره طبیب‌زاده نوری) is an Iranian dentist and conservative politician who was formerly a member of the Parliament of Iran representing Tehran, Rey, Shemiranat and Eslamshahr.

She was appointed by Mahmoud Ahmadinejad as the head of Center for Women and Family Affairs.

Government offices
Preceded by Nasrin Soltankhah	Head of Center for Women and Family Affairs; 2006–2009	Succeeded by Maryam Mojtahedzadeh
