= Hassan Rasouli =

Iranian reformist politician

Seyyed Hassan Rasouli
- حسن رسولی
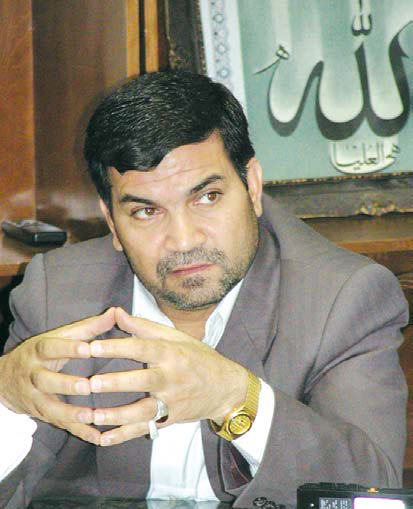
- Rasouli in 2002

Member of City Council of Tehran
- In office 23 August 2017 – 4 August 2021

Governor of Razavi Khorasan Province
- In office 9 August 2004 – October 2005
- President: Mohammad Khatami
- Preceded by: Province created
- Succeeded by: Mohammad-Javad Mohammadizadeh

Governor of Khorasan Province
- In office December 2001 – 9 August 2004
- President: Mohammad Khatami
- Preceded by: Mohsen Mehralizadeh
- Succeeded by: Province divided

Governor of Lorestan Province
- In office 18 September 1997 – 22 June 2000
- President: Mohammad Khatami
- Preceded by: Mohammad-Javad Mohammadizadeh
- Succeeded by: Nourollah Abedi

Personal details
- Party: Omid Iranian

Hassan Rasouli (Persian: حسن رسولی) was an Iranian reformist politician who was a member of the City Council of Tehran. He served as a governor under President Mohammad Khatami.

As prior deputy managing director of the Foundation for Freedom, Growth and Development of Iran (BARAN Foundation, outlawed in 2011), he was arrested in December 2009 following the Ashura protests and held in Solitary confinement in Evin Prison.

Rasouli formerly served as Mohammad-Reza Aref spokesman and senior adviser in 2013 and is a member of the 'Reformists' Supreme Council for Policymaking'.
