= Marand =

City in East Azerbaijan province, Iran

Marand Persian: مرند
- City
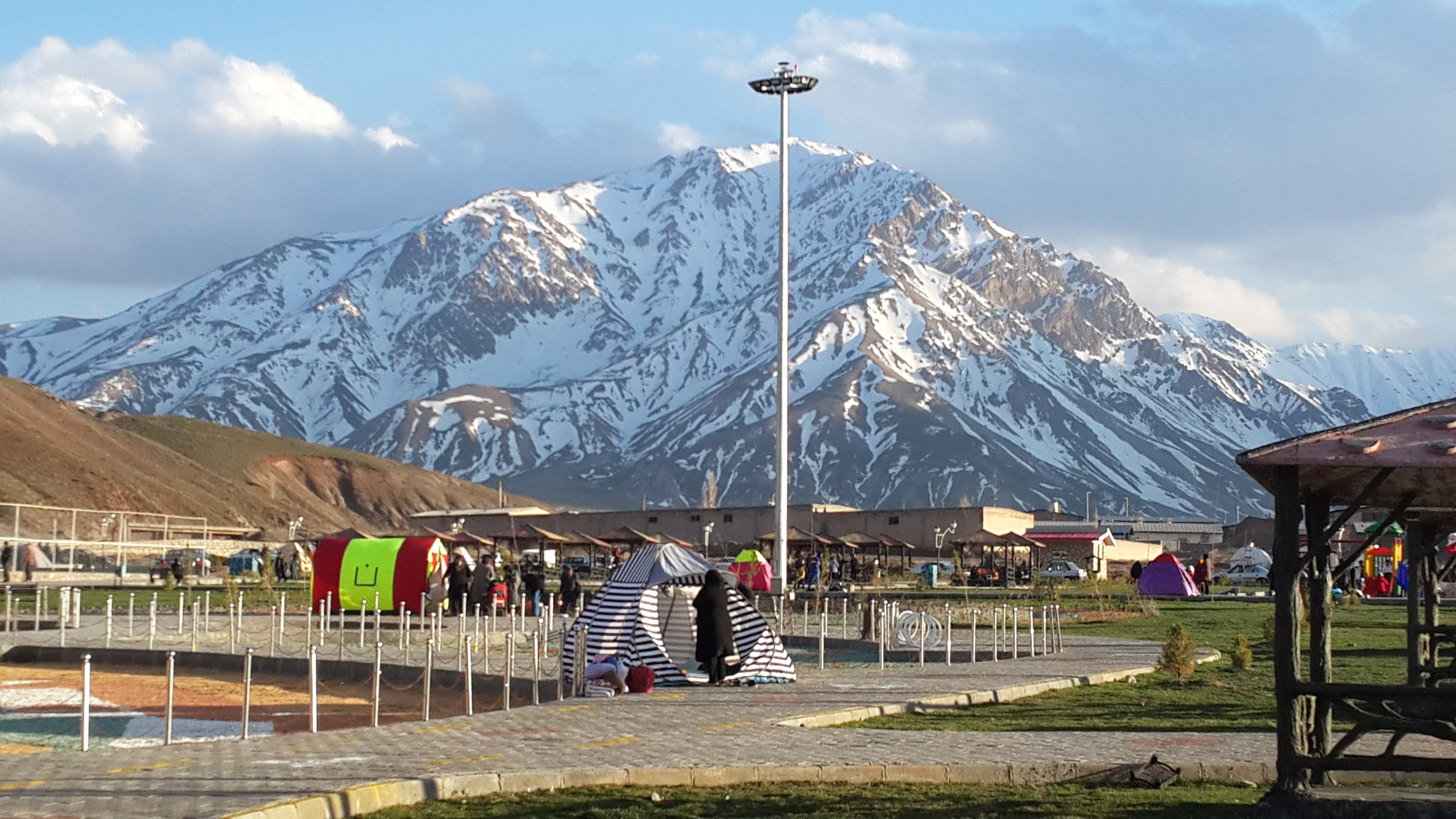

- Location within Iran
- Coordinates: 38°25′51″N 45°46′27″E
- Country: Iran
- Province: East Azerbaijan
- County: Marand
- District: Central

Government
  - Mayor: Reza Asadi
  - parliament member: Hassannejad

Population (2016)
  - Total: 130,825
- Time zone: UTC+3:30 (IRST)

Marand (Persian: مرند) (Note: Also romanized as Morand) is a city in the Central District of Marand County, East Azerbaijan province, Iran, serving as capital of both the county and the district.

Marand is among the major cities of East Azerbaijan province. It is in the northwest of the capital of the province, Tabriz. Marand has been known by various names in history, such as Maryana, Mandagarana, and Maranda.

== Etymology ==
Moritz von Kotzebue and August von Haxthausen both described local legends that placed the burial spot of Noah's wife at Marand. Both authors contended that the name of the city means "the mother lies here," referring to Noah's wife. According to Kotzebue:

Of Maranda, it is likewise asserted by the local Armenians, that Noah's immediate descendants settled there, and even that it is the place of his wife's interment. Who could have neglected the sight of such a hallowed ground? Curiosity led us to the spot, and we found that the Moslems had built, on the place where Noah's wife is reported to have been buried, a chapel, with bare walls, which are not so cleanly as the religion of Mahomet prescribes. When the chapel was finished, nobody, however, would undertake to point out the actual spot where the body lay. A miracle solved their doubts. Thirty-eight years ago, during an earthquake, the ground opened, and two Mollahs (Moslem priests), of whom we saw one in the chapel, together with several inhabitants, witnessed the sudden appearance of a large tomb of stone, which, however, soon vanished in the opening. From that time, true believers have been convinced that Noah's wife lies interred there; although it would seem, that the honour of actual sepulture is a point at issue between her and Noah's mother, as Maranda signifies, in the Armenian language, the "mother lies here." This grave, perhaps, contributed to induce the [Imperial Russian] Ambassador to rest here a day.

== History ==
The history of the town goes back to the pre-Islamic era. Between 815 till 850, Marand was primarily controlled by Mohammad ibn Ba'ith who was Iranicized to a considerable extent. The elders of Maragha who quoted his Persian poetry also praised his bravery and his literary ability. He was Iranicized to considerable extent and the statement of Tabari on him is evidence of the existence of the cultivation of poetry in Persian in northwest Persia at the beginning of the 9th century.

== Demographics ==
=== Population ===
At the time of the 2006 National Census, the city's population was 114,165 in 29,755 households. The following census in 2011 counted 124,323 people in 35,805 households. The 2016 census measured the population of the city as 130,825 people in 40,275 households.

== Climate ==
Climate data for Marand (2000-2005)
Month	Jan	Feb	Mar	Apr	May	Jun	Jul	Aug	Sep	Oct	Nov	Dec	Year
Mean daily maximum °C (°F)	1.6 (34.9)	4.3 (39.7)	10.0 (50.0)	15.7 (60.3)	20.3 (68.5)	26.8 (80.2)	30.7 (87.3)	31.0 (87.8)	26.2 (79.2)	19.0 (66.2)	9.6 (49.3)	2.8 (37.0)	16.5 (61.7)
Daily mean °C (°F)	−1.7 (28.9)	0.6 (33.1)	5.8 (42.4)	11.2 (52.2)	15.4 (59.7)	21.3 (70.3)	25.3 (77.5)	25.6 (78.1)	21.1 (70.0)	14.5 (58.1)	6.1 (43.0)	−0.5 (31.1)	12.1 (53.7)
Mean daily minimum °C (°F)	−5.1 (22.8)	−3.2 (26.2)	1.5 (34.7)	6.8 (44.2)	10.5 (50.9)	15.8 (60.4)	19.9 (67.8)	20.2 (68.4)	16.0 (60.8)	10.0 (50.0)	2.6 (36.7)	−3.7 (25.3)	7.6 (45.7)
Average precipitation mm (inches)	27.8 (1.09)	26.1 (1.03)	44.0 (1.73)	60.0 (2.36)	53.8 (2.12)	13.7 (0.54)	10.5 (0.41)	5.6 (0.22)	5.4 (0.21)	17.1 (0.67)	43.3 (1.70)	31.0 (1.22)	338.3 (13.3)
Average precipitation days (≥ 0)	9.2	9.5	9.8	13.2	14.3	5.3	5.0	2.2	2.7	6.8	8.2	10.5	96.7
Average snowy days	8.0	6.8	4.7	1.3	0.2	0	0	0	0	0.3	1.5	7.2	30
Average relative humidity (%)	72	62	52	51	49	38	35	34	37	47	62	72	51
Average dew point °C (°F)	−6.3 (20.7)	−6.1 (21.0)	−3.7 (25.3)	1.0 (33.8)	4.3 (39.7)	6.1 (43.0)	8.3 (46.9)	7.8 (46.0)	5.2 (41.4)	2.7 (36.9)	−0.8 (30.6)	−5.1 (22.8)	1.1 (34.0)
Source: IRIMO

== Notable people ==
For a complete list see: Category:People from Marand

- Ganjali Sabahi (1909–1990) - Writer
- Aboutaleb Talebi (born 1945) - wrestler
- Musa Kalantari (1949–1981) - politician
- Jalil Farjad (born 1951) - Theatre and film actor
- Gholamreza Shafeei (born 1951) - politician
- Isa Kalantari (born 1952) - politician
- Mohammad-Taghi Pourmohammadi (born 1956) - cleric
- Shirin Bina (born 1964) - Theatre and film actor
- Meysam Naghizadeh (born 1986) - football player
- Mohsen Delir (born 1988) - football player

== See also ==
- Marand Khanate
