= Mousa Kalantari =

Iranian politician (1949–1981)

- موسی کلانتری
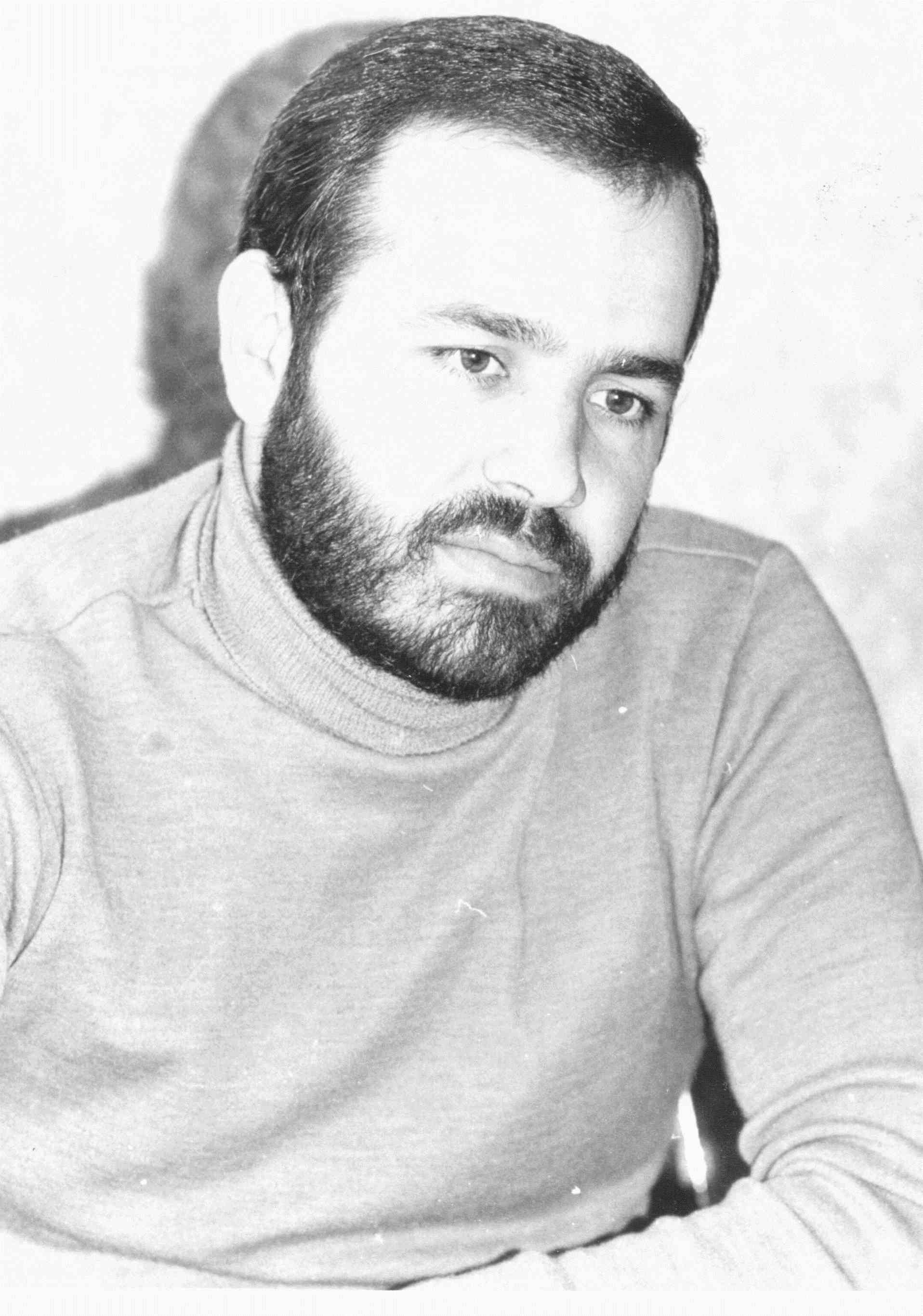

Minister of Housing and Urban Development
- In office 4 February 1980 – 28 June 1981
- President: Abolhassan Banisadr
- Prime Minister: Mohammad-Ali Rajai
- Preceded by: Yousef Taheri
- Succeeded by: Hadi Nejadhosseinian

Personal details
- Born: 1949 Marand, East Azerbaijan, Iran
- Died: 28 June 1981 (aged 31–32) Tehran, Iran
- Party: Islamic Republican Party
- Education: Amirkabir University of Technology

Mousa Kalantari (Persian: موسی کلانتری; 1949 in Marand — 28 June 1981 in Tehran) was an Iranian civil engineer and the cabinet minister of transportation in the government of Abolhassan Banisadr. He was the elder brother of Isa Kalantari.

Kalantari was killed in a terrorist attack on 28 June 1981, when a bomb exploded during a political party conference (Hafte tir bombing) with 73 other attendees.
