= Ali Salajegheh =

Iranian politician

- علی سلاجقه
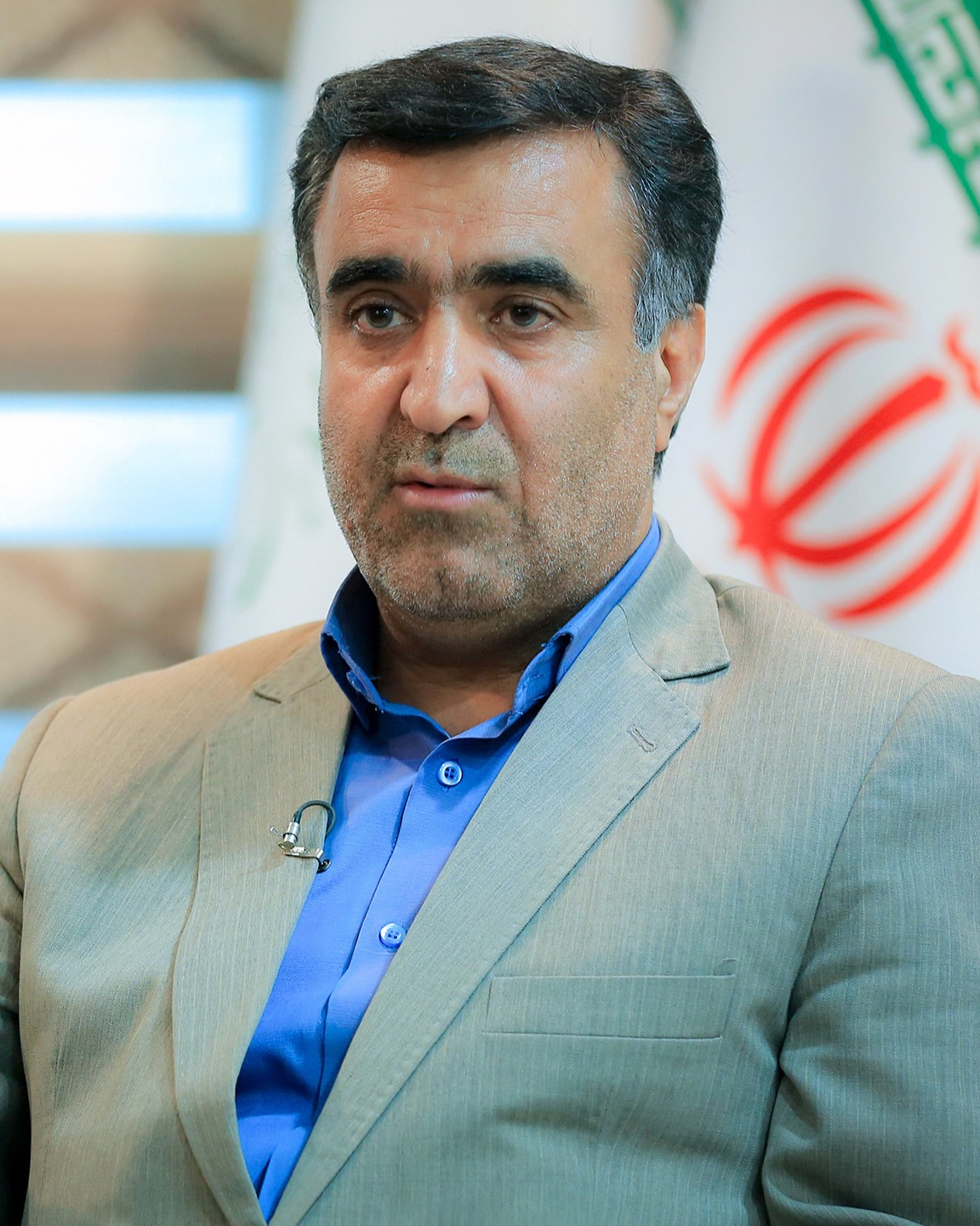
- Salajegheh in 2023

Vice President of Iran Head of Department of Environment
- In office 3 October 2021 – 22 August 2024
- President: Ebrahim Raisi; Mohammad Mokhber (acting)
- Preceded by: Isa Kalantari
- Succeeded by: Shina Ansari

Personal details
- Born: 1967 (age 58–59) Rabor, Kerman province, Iran
- Education: Tehran University; University of Central Florida
- Occupation: Politician, Environmentalist
- Profession: water resources engineer

Ali Salajegheh (Persian: علی سلاجقه; born 1967) was the Vice President of Iran and Head of Iran's Department of Environment in the 13th government from 2021 to 2024. He was previously Deputy Minister of Agriculture and Head of the Forests and Rangelands Organization of Iran.

Salajegheh has a PhD from the University of Tehran. His post-doctoral studies observed water footprint accounting under the supervision of Professor Kaveh Madani.
