= Shahindokht Molaverdi =

Iranian academic, feminist, jurist and scholar

- شهیندخت مولاوردی
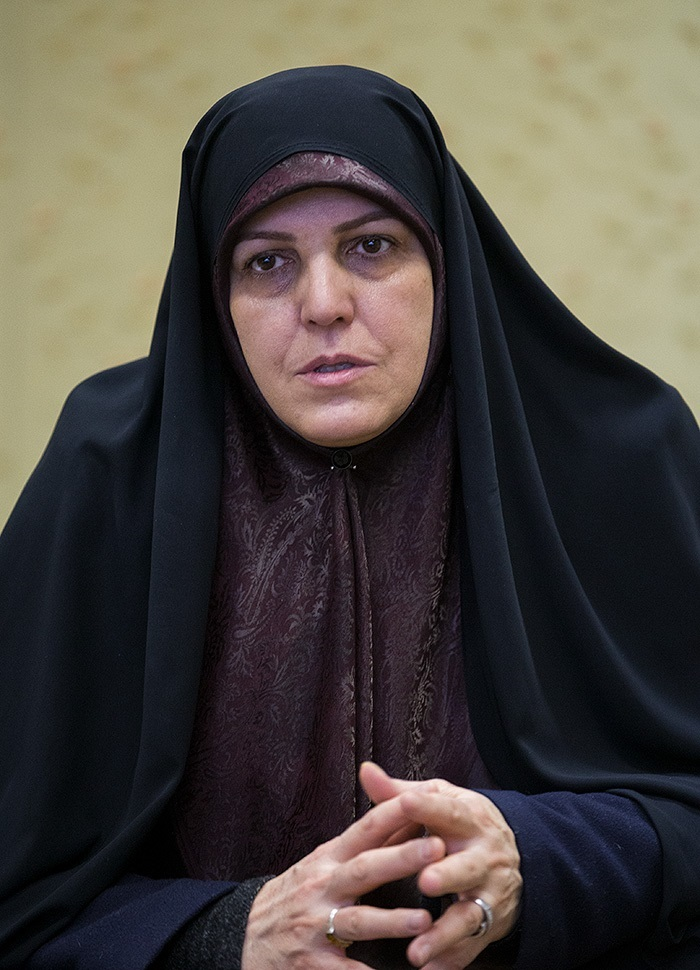
- Molaverdi in 2018

Special Assistant to the President for Citizenship rights
- In office 9 August 2017 – 24 November 2018
- President: Hassan Rouhani
- Preceded by: Elham Aminzadeh

Vice President of Iran for Women and Family Affairs
- In office 8 October 2013 – 9 August 2017
- President: Hassan Rouhani
- Preceded by: Maryam Mojtahedzadeh
- Succeeded by: Masoumeh Ebtekar

Personal details
- Born: October 23, 1965 (age 61) Khoy, West Azerbaijan, Iran
- Party: Society for Support of Women's Rights
- Other political affiliations: Islamic Iran Participation Front
- Spouse: Hamid Ayati
- Children: 2
- Education: Shahid Beheshti University; Allameh Tabatabaei University
- Profession: Lawyer

Shahindokht Molaverdi (Persian: شهیندخت مولاوردی; born 23 October 1965) is an Iranian academic, feminist, jurist, scholar, and former vice president of Iran and aide to the President of Iran.

== Early life ==
Molaverdi was born 23 October 1965 in Khoy, West Azerbaijan Province in Iran. She later moved to Tehran. She has a bachelor of laws degree from Shahid Beheshti University, and a master’s degree in human rights from Allameh Tabatabaei University in Tehran. She has also written a number of books regarding women's rights.

== Career ==
Molaverdi served as vice president for women and family affairs in Iranian President Hassan Rouhani's first cabinet (2013–2017).

Between 2017 and 2021 she worked as the director of International Affairs at the Center for Women and Family Participation, and subsequently ran her own Tehran law office.

In Rouhani's second cabinet (2017–2021), Molaverdi became his special assistant for citizenship rights.

Political issues that Molaverdi spoke on included her being against child marriage (as five per cent of Iranian girls are married between the ages of nine and fifteen), the sale of unborn babies, against the Iranian law that forbids a wife from leaving Iran without her husband’s permission, and in favor of women being allowed into sports stadiums. The Ansar-e Hezbollah hardliner extremist weekly Yalasarat said that she was inviting prostitution "under the guise of freedom.”

On November 24, 2018, she resigned and retired.

== Criminal charges ==
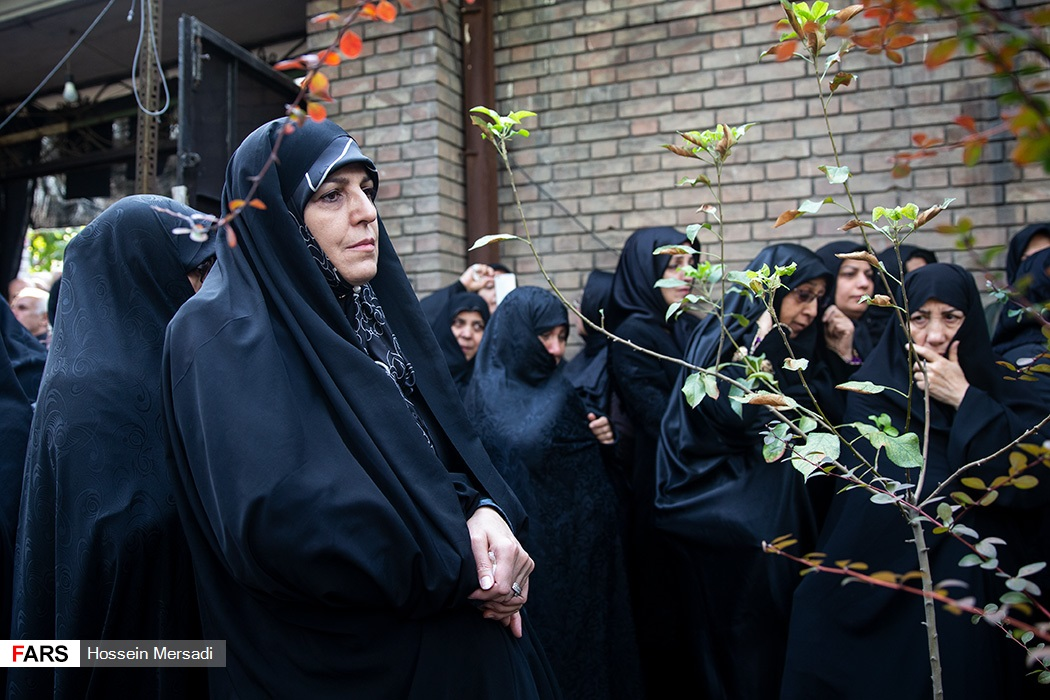
At the funeral of Azam Taleghan, 2019.

In 2020, Molaverdi was accused, found guilty, and sentenced to 30 months in prison, for leaking information to foreign countries and for carrying out political propaganda against the Islamic regime. In 2023, according to a concurrent resolution passed overwhelmingly with 420 "yea" votes in the 118th Congress of the United States, "Shahindokht Molaverdi ... was charged with encouraging 'corruption, prostitution, and sexual deviance', a common charge against women refusing mandatory hijab laws, and sentenced in December 2020 to 30 months in prison for defending the right of women to attend sporting events and criticizing the practice of child marriage."

She was never imprisoned. Molaverdi appealed, and was acquitted of all charges in 2022.

Party political offices
| New title Party founded | Secretary-General of the Society for Support of Women's Rights; 2001–present | Incumbent |
