= Shina Ansari =

Iranian politician and environmentalist (born 1972)

- شینا انصاری
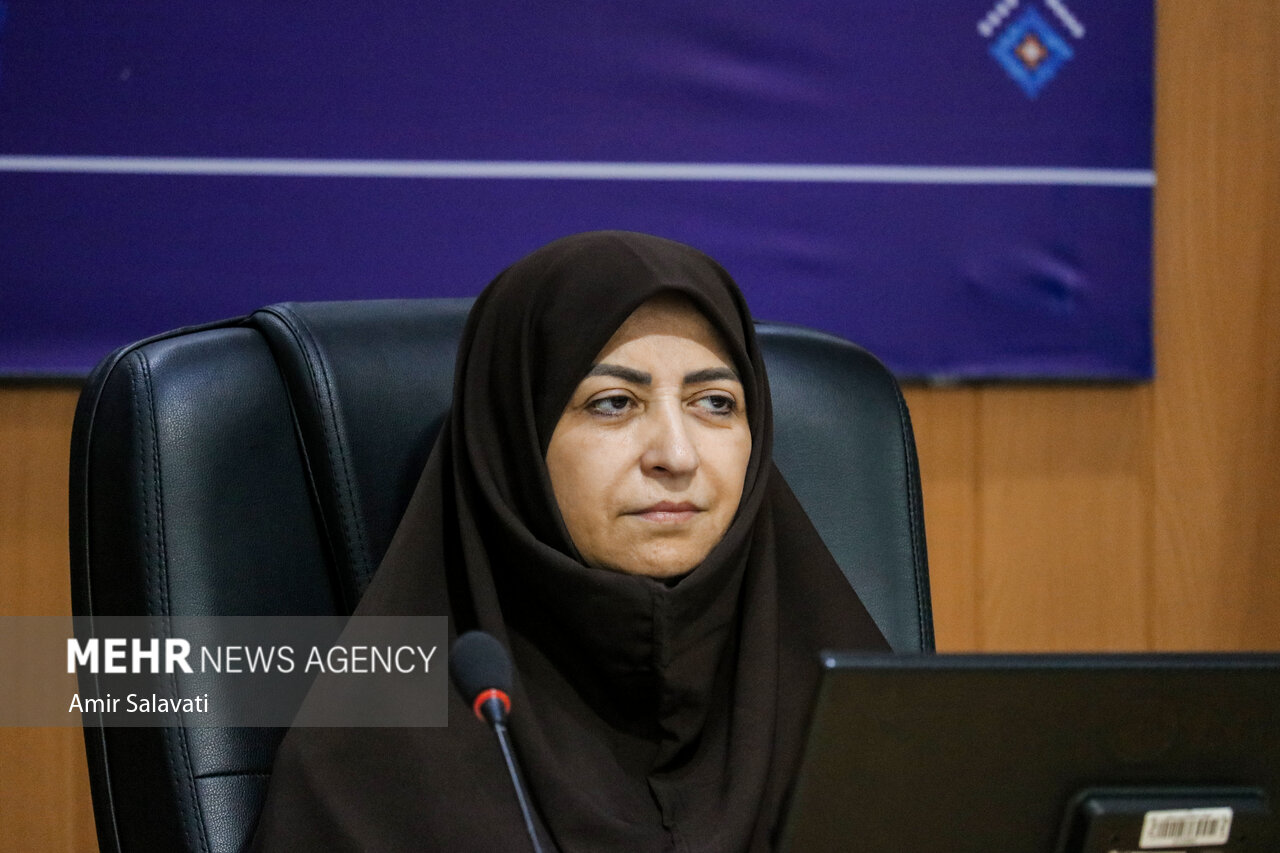
- Ansari in 2025

Vice President of Iran Head of Department of Environment
- Incumbent
- Assumed office 22 August 2024
- President: Masoud Pezeshkian
- Preceded by: Ali Salajegheh

Personal details
- Born: 1973 (age 52–53) Tehran, Iran
- Education: Islamic Azad University; Bu-Ali Sina University
- Occupation: Politician, Environmentalist, academician
- Profession: PhD in Environmental Management

Shina Ansari (Note: Persian: شینا انصاری) (born 1973) is an Iranian politician and environmentalist and currently Vice President of Iran and the Head of Iran's Department of Environment. She is one of the three female members of the cabinet for President Masoud Pezeshkian.

She has a PhD from the Islamic Azad University within environmental management. Her previous roles and assignments were as follows:

- Advisor at Air Quality Control center at Municipality of Tehran
- Head of Environment and Sustainable Development, Municipality of Tehran
- General Director Bureau of Comprehensive Environmental Pollution Monitoring, Iran Department Of Environment
- Deputy of Technical Affairs, Alborz Province Environmental Directorate
- Deputy of Technical Affairs, Tehran Province Environmental Directorate

== Personal life and education ==
Shina Ansari was born in 1974 in Tehran, Iran. She completed her higher education in the field of environmental sciences, earning a PhD in Environmental Management. Her academic focus has been closely aligned with urban environmental challenges, particularly air quality and pollution control. Ansari began her professional career working on environmental issues in Tehran Municipality, where she contributed to developing policies for reducing air pollution in the capital. Her technical background and administrative experience eventually led to her appointment to national-level roles in the Department of Environment.

In 2024, Ansari published a memoir titled Gat-e Marizi (“Step of Illness”), in which she shared her personal experience of living with breast cancer over several years.

== Political views and public statements ==
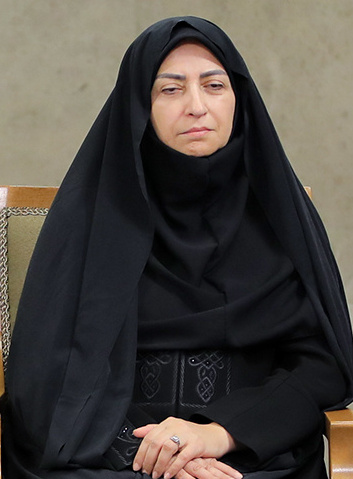
Shina Ansari in 2024

Shina Ansari has emphasized the need for universal access to green technologies and financial support, arguing that "illegal and unilateral" international sanctions block Iran from developing a green economy and limit its ability to reduce greenhouse gas emissions or pivot to renewable and nuclear energy during COP29. She further asserted that environmental challenges must transcend politics, stating at COP29 that “environmental issues must be addressed regardless of political matters,” and criticized the “cruel sanctions” that impede Iran’s participation in UN climate frameworks.

Ansari has also voiced urgent concern over biodiversity loss, particularly emphasizing that only 17 Asiatic cheetahs remain, all in Iran. She warned that this critically low population calls for immediate collaboration among agencies like the traffic police to prevent fatal vehicle collisions ﹣ highlighting the plight during a memorandum signing ceremony.
