= Ensieh Khazali =

Iranian politician

- انسیه خزعلی
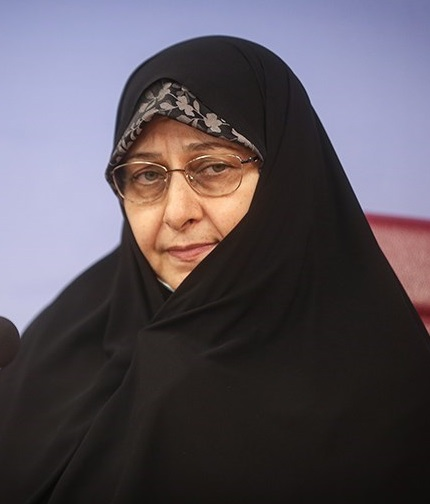
- Khazali in 2021

Vice President of Iran for Women and Family Affairs
- In office 1 September 2021 – 10 August 2024
- President: Ebrahim Raisi; Mohammad Mokhber (acting)
- Preceded by: Masoumeh Ebtekar
- Succeeded by: Zahra Behrouz Azar

President of Al-Zahra University
- In office 2012–2017
- Preceded by: Mahbobeh Mobasheri
- Succeeded by: Mahnaz Molla-Nazari

Personal details
- Born: Ensieh Khazali انسیه خزعلی; 1963 (age 62–63) Qom, Imperial State of Iran
- Spouse: Mohammad-Reza Rezazadeh
- Children: 4
- Parent(s): Abolghasem Khazali (father); Tahereh Kalbasi (mother)
- Education: Tehran University
- Occupation: Politician

Ensieh Khazali or Ensieh Khaz'ali (Persian: انسیه خزعلی; born 1963) is an Iranian politician and Vice President for Women and Family Affairs of the President of Iran in the 13th government.

She is a professor of the Arabic language and literature, and was the President of Al-Zahra University and the dean of the campus of the Razavi University of the Islamic Sciences.

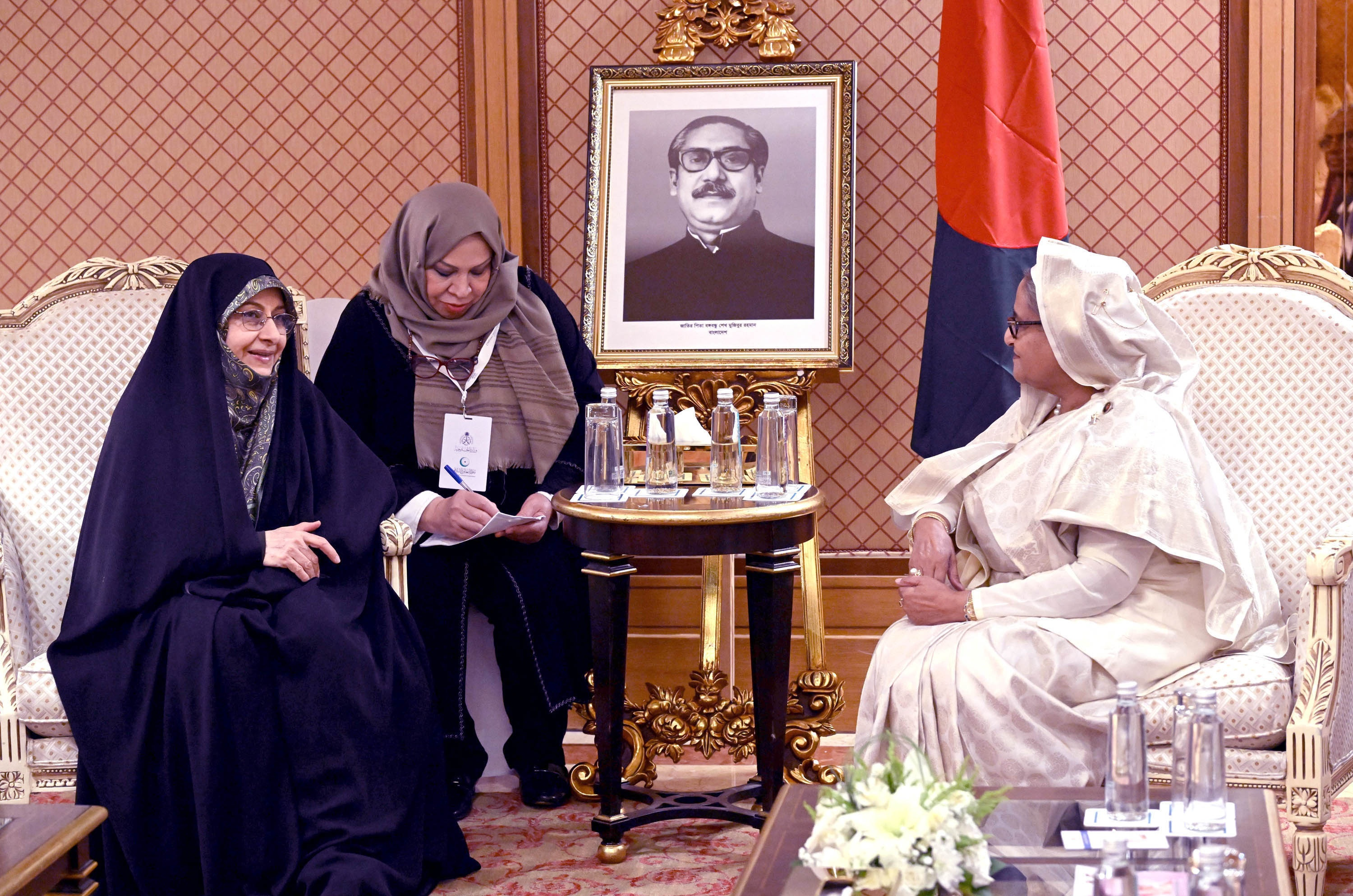
Bangladeshi Prime Minister Sheikh Hasina meeting with Khazali in Jeddah in November 2023

== Scandals ==
While Ibrahim Raisi's government is known for broadening online censorship in Iran, Khazali’s son emigrated to Canada and created a company that sells virtual private networks (VPNs), which many Iranians use to bypass state censorship of the Internet. Khazali herself is an advocate of limiting Iranians' access to the Internet.
