= Vice Presidency for Women and Family Affairs =

Iranian political office

Agency overview
- Formed: 11 May 2013; 13 years ago
- Jurisdiction: Islamic Republic of Iran
- Agency executive: Zahra Behrouz Azar, Vice President
- Website: en.women.gov.ir

Vice Presidency for Women and Family Affairs is a cabinet-level position in Iran, headed by one of the vice presidents.

== History ==
Before the Iranian Revolution in 1979, only a woman served in a similar capacity. Mahnaz Afkhami assumed office as the government minister responsible for women's affairs under administration of Prime Minister Amir-Abbas Hoveyda.

Shahla Habibi was appointed as the head of newly-established 'Office of Women's Affairs' and advisor in 1991. Her deputy Masoumeh Ebtekar, was reportedly the "main driving-force" behind the office. The office was renamed to the 'Centre for Women's Participation Affairs' under administration Mohammad Khatami and remained an advisor position, with Zahra Shojaei was appointed as its head. Under Mahmoud Ahmadinejad, the office was renamed to the 'Center for Women and Family Affairs' in 2005, a change that signaled the conservative attitude towards the women. Nasrin Soltankhah, Zohreh Tabibzadeh-Nouri and Maryam Mojtahedzadeh served in the capacity of heading the office until 2013, when the officeholder was promoted to a Vice President.

Name	Office	Time in office	Appointer
Mahnaz Afkhami	Minister without Portfolio for Women's Affairs	1976–1978	Amir-Abbas Hoveyda
Shahla Habibi	Office of Women's Affairs	1991–1997	Akbar Hashemi Rafsanjani
Zahra Shojaei	Center for Women's Participation Affairs	1997–2005	Mohammad Khatami
Nasrin Soltankhah	Center for Women and Family Affairs	2005–2006	Mahmoud Ahmadinejad
Zohreh Tabibzadeh-Nouri	Center for Women and Family Affairs	2006–2009	Mahmoud Ahmadinejad
Maryam Mojtahedzadeh	Center for Women and Family Affairs	2009–2013	Mahmoud Ahmadinejad

== List of Vice Presidents for Women and Family Affairs ==
No.	Portrait	Name	Term in office		Affiliation	President
No.	Portrait	Name	Assumed	Left	Affiliation	President
1		Maryam Mojtahedzadeh	27 July 2013	8 October 2013	—N/a	Mahmoud Ahmadinejad
2		Shahindokht Molaverdi	8 October 2013	9 August 2017	Islamic Iran Participation Front	Hassan Rouhani
3		Masoumeh Ebtekar	9 August 2017	1 September 2021	Islamic Iran Participation Front	Hassan Rouhani
4		Ensieh Khazali	1 September 2021	10 August 2024	—N/a	Ebrahim Raisi
5		Zahra Behrouz Azar	10 August 2024	incumbent	Union of Islamic Iran People Party	Masoud Pezeshkian
