= Maryam Mojtahedzadeh =

Iranian nurse, educator and conservative politician

- مریم مجتهدزاده
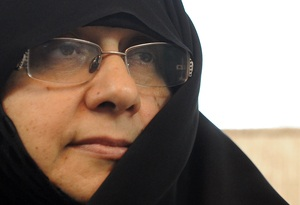
- Mojtahedzadeh in 2010

Vice President of Iran for Women and Family Affairs
- In office 27 July 2013 – 8 October 2013
- President: Mahmoud Ahmadinejad
- Preceded by: Office established
- Succeeded by: Shahindokht Molaverdi

Head of Center for Women and Family Affairs
- In office 14 November 2009 – 27 July 2013
- President: Mahmoud Ahmadinejad
- Preceded by: Zohreh Tabibzadeh-Nouri
- Succeeded by: Office abolished

Personal details
- Born: Maryam Mojtahedzadeh Larijani c. 1957 (age 68–69) Sari, Iran
- Spouse: Seyed Mohsen Mousavi
- Children: 1
- Education: Tarbiat Modares University; University of Georgia (dropped out)
- Profession: Nurse

Military service
- Allegiance: Iran
- Branch/service: Revolutionary Guards; General Staff
- Years of service: 1979–1981; 2013–present
- Unit: Nurse Corps
- Battles/wars: Iran–Iraq War

Maryam Mojtahedzadeh (Persian: مریم مجتهدزاده) is an Iranian nurse, educator and conservative politician who was formerly Vice President of Iran under Mahmoud Ahmadinejad. She is currently head of Organization for Preserving Values and Publications of Women's Participation in Sacred Defence of General Staff of Armed Forces of the Islamic Republic of Iran.

== See also ==
- Iranian principlists

Government offices
| Preceded by Zohreh Tabibzadeh-Nouri as Head of Center for Women and Family Affairs | Vice President of Iran for Women and Family Affairs; 2013; 2009–2013 as Head of Center for Women and Family Affairs | Succeeded by Shahindokht Molaverdi |
