= Zahra Behrouz Azar =

Iranian politician

- زهرا بهروز آذر
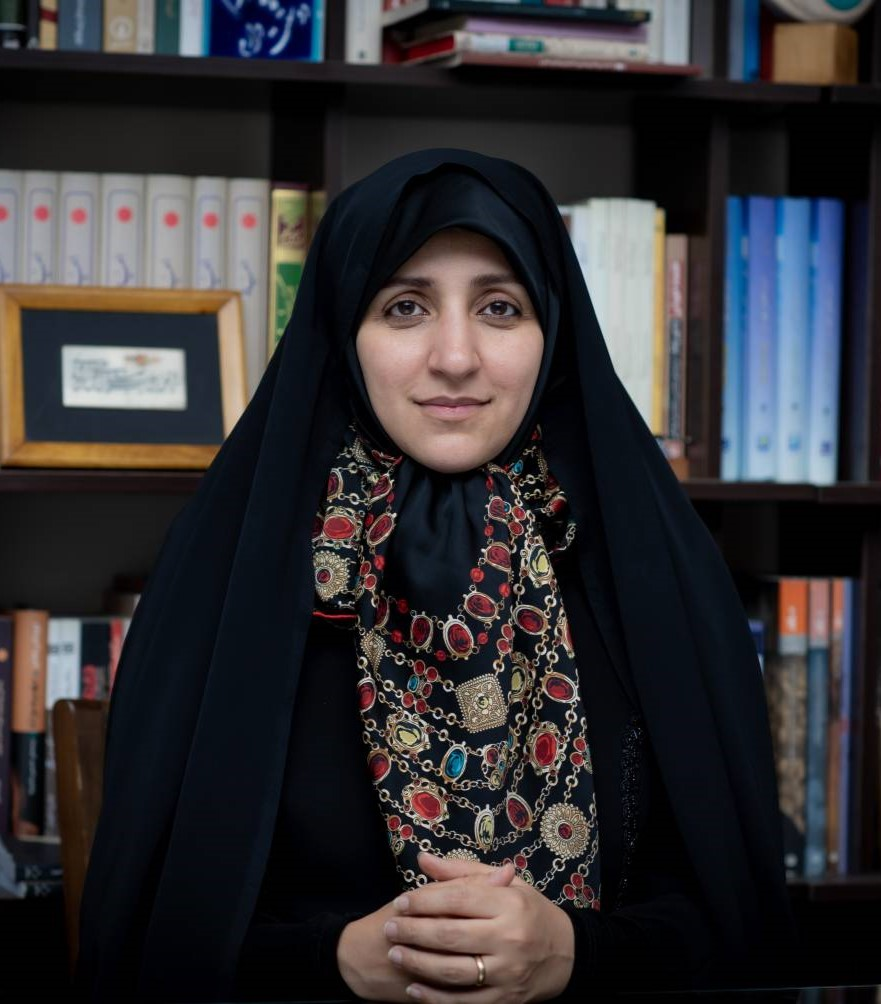
- Behrouz-Azar in 2025

Vice President of Iran for Women and Family Affairs
- Incumbent
- Assumed office 10 August 2024
- President: Masoud Pezeshkian
- Preceded by: Ensieh Khazali

Personal details
- Born: 1981 (age 44–45)
- Party: Union of Islamic Iran People Party
- Spouse: Pedram Alvandi
- Education: Tehran University
- Occupation: Politician

Zahra Behrouz Azar (Persian: زهرا بهروز آذر; born 1981) is an Iranian researcher, entrepreneur and politician serving as the vice president of Iran for women and family affairs since 2024, in the government of Masoud Pezeshkian.

== Career ==
During the administration of Pirouz Hanachi in Tehran Municipality, she was the head of the General Department of Women's Affairs of Tehran Municipality and before that, she was the head of Tehran's Urban Statistics and Monitoring Center. She has a doctorate in entrepreneurship development from Tehran University.

In June 2025 she said that in Iran the rate of violence and spousal abuse against women was 30 times higher than the rate against men.

In May 2026, she criticized Iran's government for having restricted international internet access in Iran during the 2026 Iran War that began on February 28, 2026, saying that a digital economy cannot be sustained without internet access.
