= Tandooreh National Park =

Protected area in northeastern Iran

- IUCN category II (national park)
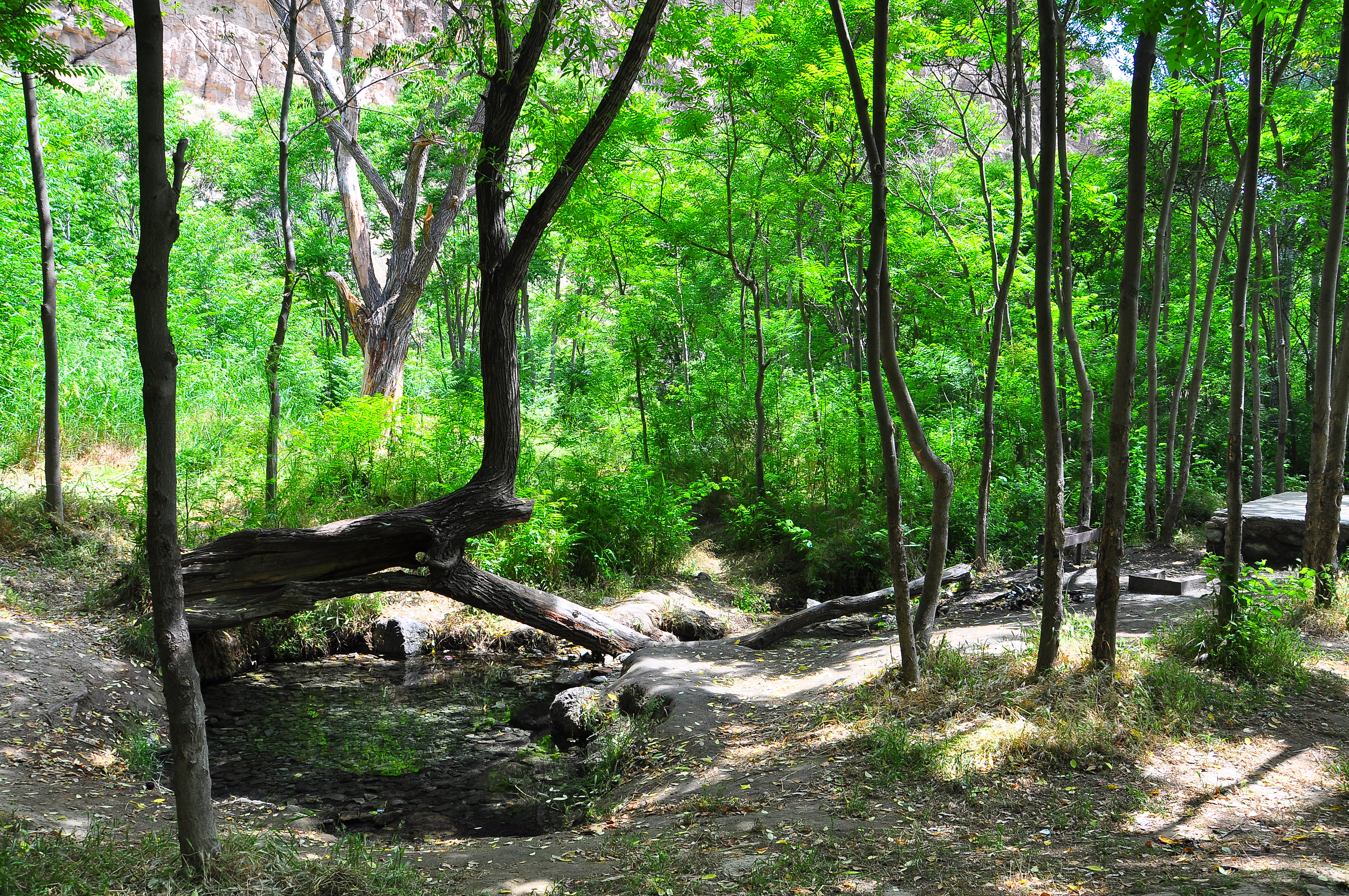

- Location within Iran
- Location: Iran
- Coordinates: 37.43°N 58.73°E
- Area: 355.4 km^{2} (137.2 sq mi)
- Established: 1982
- Governing body: Department of the Environment

Tandooreh National Park (Persian: پارک ملی تندوره) is a protected area located in the northeast of Iran, near the city of Dargaz and the Turkmenistan border. The mountainous area features deep valleys and cliffs, with Juniper woodlands on the slopes, and wooded thickets along the rivers in the valleys. Open areas are typically Artemisia steppe. Elevations range from 980–2,600 metres (3,220–8,530 ft).
