= Gholam Reza Afkhami =

Iranian-American educator and author (1936–2024)

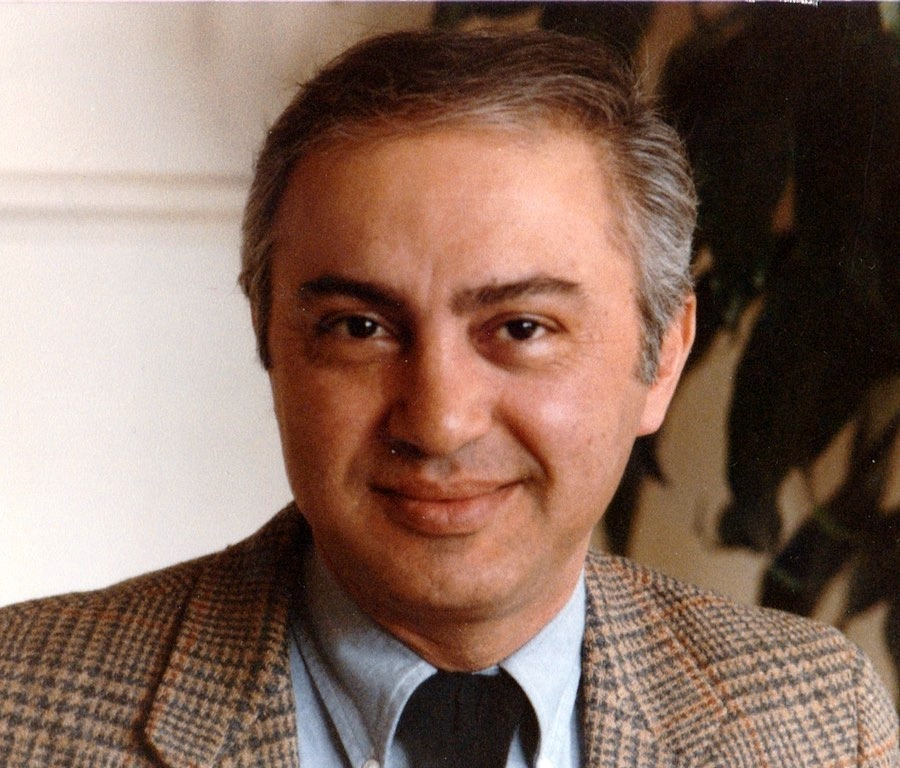
Gholam Reza Afkhami

Gholam Reza Afkhami (Persian: غلامرضا افخمی; 1936 – 26 August 2024) was an Iranian-American scholar, author, educator, and a Pahlavi Iran government official. He was the senior scholar and director of Social Science Research and International Studies at the Foundation for Iranian Studies. The Foundation for Iranian Studies is a Bethesda, Maryland-based research institution dedicated to the study of Iranian history, culture, economy and politics, created with the financial support from Princess Ashraf Pahlavi.

== Biography ==
Reza Afkhami was born in 1936. Before the Iranian Revolution, he was secretary general of Iran's National Committee for World Literacy Program (1975–1979), headed by Princess Ashraf Pahlavi, and was the Deputy Minister of Interior (1974–1975). Between 1967 and 1979 he was professor of politics and until 1974 associate dean of the College of Economics and Political Science at the National University of Iran.

Afkhami was a visiting scholar at the Hoover Institution on Revolution, War and Peace at Stanford University (1980 to 1983), where he studied issues of development in the "Third World", he lectured on conflict and concord in the U.S. relations with the countries of the Middle East, and he prepared a text on the Iranian Revolution.

Afkhami died on 26 August 2024, at the age of 87.

== Publications ==
Afkhami was the author of several books and articles in Persian and English. Afkhami's book The Life and Times of the Shah (University of California Press; winter 2008), is a detailed history of Mohammad Reza Pahlavi, the Shah of Iran 1941 to 1979, which is set against the political, economic, social, and cultural dynamics of the country and the world in which he lived and worked.

=== English ===
- The Iranian Revolution: Thanatos on a National Scale (1985) ISBN 978-0-916808-28-0
- The Nature of the Pahlavi Monarchy in Iran, in Peter Chelkowski and Robert Pranger, Eds.
- Power and Conflict in the Middle East (1987)
- The Oral History Collection of the Foundation for Iranian Studies, co-edited with Seyyed Vali Reza Nasr (1991), among others. OCLC 27194071
- Afkhami, Gholam Reza (2008). The Life and Times of the Shah. Berkeley, CA: University of California Press. ISBN 9780520253285.

=== Persian ===
- A Series in Iran's Economic and Social Development, 1941–1978
  - Khuzistan's Development (1995)
  - Iran's Atomic Energy Program (1997)
  - The Evolution of Iran's Oil Policy (1998)
  - Ideology, Process and Politics in Iran's Development Planning (1999)
  - The Evolution of Iran's Gas Industry (1999)
  - The Evolution of Iran's Petrochemical Industry (2001)
  - Ideology, Politics and Process in Iran's Economic Development, 1960-1970 (2001)
  - Women, State, and Society in Iran, 2 vols. (2002, 2003)
