= Mahnaz Afkhami =

Iranian women's rights activist (b. 1941)

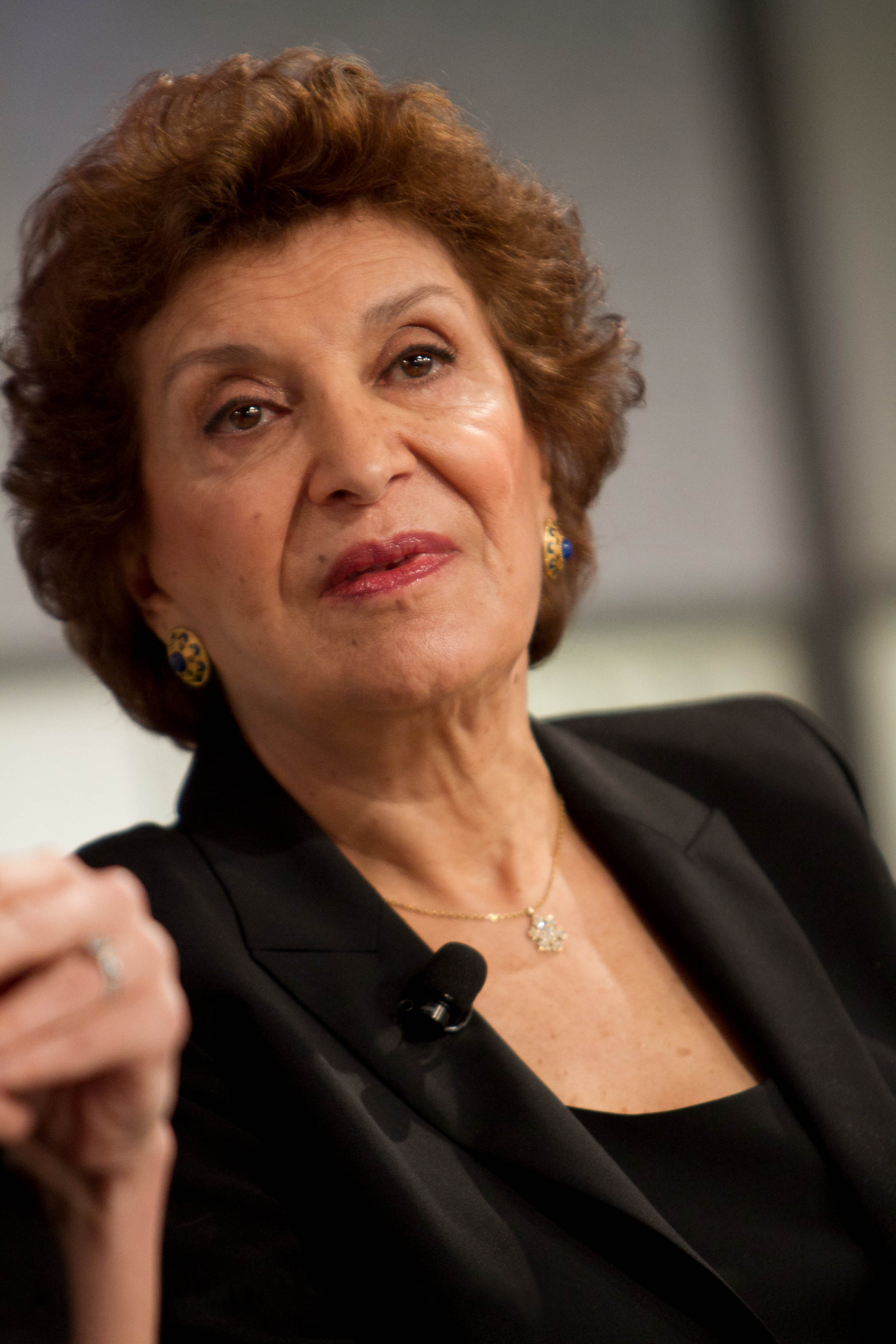
- Afkhami in 2011

Minister without portfolio for Women's Affairs
- In office 31 December 1976 – 27 August 1978
- Monarch: Mohammad-Reza Shah
- Prime Minister: Amir Abbas Hoveida; Jamshid Amouzegar

Personal details
- Born: Mahnaz Ebrahimi; 14 January 1941 (age 85) Kerman, Imperial State of Iran
- Citizenship: Iranian-American
- Party: Resurgence Party (1975–1978); New Iran Party (1963–1975)
- Spouse: Gholam Reza Afkhami (m. 1967; died 2024)
- Children: 1
- Education: University of San Francisco; University of Colorado Boulder (MA)
- Occupation: Activist; Author

Mahnaz Afkhami (Persian: مهناز افخمی; born January 14, 1941) is an Iranian-American women's rights activist who served in the Cabinet of Iran from 1976 to 1978. She is founder and president of Women's Learning Partnership (WLP), executive director of the Foundation for Iranian Studies, and former Minister of Women's Affairs in Iran's pre-Revolution government. She has lived in exile in the United States since 1979.

Afkhami has been an advocate for women's rights since the 1970s. She has founded and headed several international non-governmental organizations focused on advancing the status of women in Iran and later around the world. She has lectured and published extensively on the international women's movement, women's human rights, women in leadership, women and technology, the status of women in Muslim-majority societies, and on women's participation in civil society-building and democratization. Her books have been translated into multiple languages and distributed internationally.

== Biography ==
Mahnaz Afkhami was born in Kerman, Iran in 1941, the eldest of three children. Her early childhood was spent in Kerman in a complex that housed a large extended family of Sheikhi Shi'ite Muslims.

When she was 11, her mother divorced her father and they moved to the United States. She later attended the University of San Francisco and the University of Colorado Boulder.

In 1967, Mahnaz returned to Iran as a professor of literature at the National University of Iran. She worked there until 1978. Since then, she has lived in the United States, residing in Maryland with her husband, Gholam Reza Afkhami, until his death. She has a son and two grandchildren.

== Activism ==
=== Leadership and political participation ===
At 17, Afkhami joined a trade union and successfully challenged a breach of her rights as a worker when an employer laid her off temporarily then rehired her to avoid paying for the vacation she had earned. She credits this incident for giving her the belief that organizing could bring about social change.

In 1976, Afkhami was asked to join the Cabinet of Iran and became Minister of Women's Affairs. The post had not existed in Iran before, and the only other person holding such a position was Françoise Giroud in France.

In 2001, Afkhami published Leading to Choices: A Leadership Training Handbook for Women to encourage women to be leaders in their families, communities, and countries. It has been translated into 20 languages. In 2010, she published Leading to Action: A Political Participation Handbook for Women. The manuals have been used for training around the world, reaching thousands.

Afkhami and her sister Farah Abrahimi were featured in the PBS series Destination America in 2005. At the time Afkhami became Minister of Women's Affairs, her sister was a leader in the students' movement demanding the overthrow of the Shah Mohammad Reza Pahlavi.

=== Gender equality ===
In 1969, two years after returning to Iran as a professor of literature and Chair of the Department of English at the National University of Iran, Afkhami was drawn into Iran's women's movement and founded the Association of University Women. In 1970, she became the secretary general of the Women's Organization of Iran (WOI). She remained there for ten years, during which time she worked for Iranian women's rights.

While Afkhami was Minister of Women's Affairs, Iran's legislation granted women equal rights as regards divorce; raised the minimum age of marriage; supported women's employment with maternity leave and childcare provision; and built upon the family laws of 1967.

Afkhami has served as a member of Iran's High Council of Family Planning and Welfare and on the boards of trustees of Kerman University and Farah University for Women. She has written that "[w]omen's empowerment is a process, a holistic approach that involves raising consciousness, building skills and reforming unjust laws that limit women's education, their employment, their participation in decision making and, above all, their opportunities for economic independence."

=== Exile and involvement in the international women's movement ===
When Iran's Islamic Revolution began in 1979, Afkhami was at the United Nations in New York City negotiating the establishment of the International Research and Training Institute for the Advancement of Women (INSTRAW). She was charged in absentia with "Corruption on earth and warring with God." She has never returned to Iran, living instead in exile, although she has said she would like to return to help rebuild Iran if its political system were to change.

She contributed the piece "A future in the past, the prerevolutionary women's movement" to the 1984 anthology Sisterhood Is Global: The International Women's Movement Anthology, edited by Robin Morgan.

In 1994, she published Women in Exile, a collection of portraits of activist women in political exile.

Afkhami then joined the international women's rights movement, saying: "The conditions women have in common outrank and outvalue those that set them apart." She became an advisor to Human Rights Watch and the vice-president and executive director of [The Sisterhood is Global?]. Since then, she has written Towards Global Feminism.

Afkhami has served on a number of boards and committees of international organizations including the Steering Committee of the World Movement for Democracy (1999–2010), the International League for Human Rights (2000–2006), the Global Fund for Women (1998–2007), Gender At Work (2003–2008), Women Leaders Intercultural Forum (2010) Global Women's Action Network for Children (2006–2009)., Global Fund for Women (1998–2007), International Museum of Women (2000–2014), Realizing Rights: The Ethical Globalization Initiative (2002–2010), and Women's Human Rights Net (2000–2004).

She serves on the Advisory Committee of the Women's Rights Division of Human Rights Watch, the Board of the Foundation for Iranian Studies, and the Board of Trustees for the Smithsonian's Freer Gallery of Art and Arthur M. Sackler Gallery.

=== Culture, Islam and universality of rights ===
Afkhami believes that religion and feminism are not incompatible ("Women ought not to be forced to choose between freedom and God"). Nonetheless, culture and religion can be problematic in terms of women's human rights: "We must pose the question: why is it that the denial of the most rudimentary rights to civil treatment for women is always based on some fundamental point of culture? Is this culture real, or is it a fetish that is used to maintain some economic, social, or simply psychological privilege?"

She has taken a stand against cultural relativism and Islamic exceptionalism, stating clearly that human rights are universal and must supersede religious frameworks: "At the center of [the] conflict is the dilemma of Muslim women's human rights – whether Muslim women have rights because they are human beings, or whether they have rights because they are Muslim women."

=== Iranian Women's Movement ===
Looking back on the changes which occurred in Iran just before the revolution, Afkhami said: "It seems to me that our main mistake was not that we did not do other things which we should have done. Our main mistake was that we created conditions in which the contradictions related to modernity, progress, equality, and human rights, especially women's rights, increased and the reaction to our work put perhaps too much pressure on the country's social fabric." She has publicly supported the Iranian One Million Signatures campaign to end discriminatory laws against women by promoting a book written by Iranian activist Noushin Ahmadi Khorasani. She believes that the movement is a new phase within a century-long cause.

Afkhami's life and work in the women's movement in Iran, breaking with tradition, and living in exile are the topics of the 2012 Voice of America Persian biopic.

=== Speaking engagements (selected) ===
Chicago Council on Global Affairs, Election 2016 and the Global Women's Movement , Chicago, IL (November 1, 2016) (Moderated by Fay Hartog-Levin with Catherine Bertini and Ellen Chesler.)

Roosevelt Institute, Women and Girls Rising Conference , New York, NY (September 11, 2014) (Moderated by LaShawn R. Jefferson with Farida Shaheed and Jocelyn Olcott)

Creative Alternatives of New York, "CANY Seminar Series: Leading to Change: Eliminating Violence Against Women ", New York, NY (November 1, 2013)

Women Deliver Conference 2013, Presidential Session: Ending Violence Against Women , Kualalumpur, Malaysia (May 29, 2013) (Moderated by Shereen El Feki with Gary Barker, Lakshmi Puri, Princess Mabel of Orange-Nassau)

Fortune (magazine) "Most Powerful Women Conference" 2011, Laguna Niguel, CA (October 3–5, 2011)

=== Chronological overview ===
- 2000–present Founder and President of Women's Learning Partnership for Rights, Development, and Peace
- 1996–99 President of Sisterhood Is Global Institute
- 1992–96 Executive Director of Sisterhood Is Global Institute
- 1989–96 vice-president of Sisterhood Is Global Institute
- 1981–present Founder and Executive Director of Foundation for Iranian Studies
- 1979–81 Consultant on Women and Development, Palo Alto, California
- 1976–78 Minister for Women's Affairs, Government of Iran
- 1970–79 Secretary General of the Women's Organization of Iran
- 1968–70 chairman, English Department, National University of Iran
- 1967–68 Assistant Professor, Department of English, National University of Iran
- 1966–67 Lecturer, University of Colorado, Colorado Springs, Colorado
- 1965–66 assistant editor, Abstracts of English Studies, Boulder, Colorado

=== Organizations founded or co-founded ===
- 2006 Global Women's Action Network for Children (with Marian Wright Edelman, Melanne Verveer, and Madeleine Albright)
- 2006 Women Leaders Intercultural Forum (with Mary Robinson, Lisa Anderson, and Thoraya Obaid)
- 2001 Gender at Work (with Kumi Naidoo, Aruna Rao, and Joanna Kerr)
- 2000 Women's Learning Partnership for Rights, Development, and Peace
- 1989 Sisterhood Is Global Institute
- 1981 Foundation for Iranian Studies
- Unknown South Tehran Development Program
- Unknown Association for Exceptional Children, Iran
- Unknown Association for English Professors in Iranian Universities
- Unknown University Women's Association of Iran

=== Honors ===
- Lifetime Achievement Award, Public Affairs Alliance of Iranian Americans, New York, NY (October 15, 2015)
- Walk of Courage Award, Lutheran Immigration and Refugee Services, Baltimore, MD (October 28, 2015)
- TrustWomen Hero Award 2015 (shortlist nominee)

== Bibliography ==
Afkhami has published articles and books, with a particular focus on women's human rights, Muslim women, as well as the Iranian women's movement.

=== Books ===
- 2022 The Other Side of Silence: A Memoir of Exile, Iran, and the Global Women's Movement. The University of North Carolina Press.
- 2015 Beyond Equality: A Manual for Human Rights Defenders (co-authored), Women's Learning Partnership, Bethesda, Maryland
- 2012 Victories Over Violence: Ensuring Safety for Women and Girls (co-authored), Women's Learning Partnership, Bethesda, Maryland
- 2010 Leading to Action: A Political Participation Handbook for Women (co-authored), Women's Learning Partnership, Bethesda, Maryland
- 2002 Toward a Compassionate Society (editor), Women's Learning Partnership, Bethesda, Maryland
- 2001 Leading to Choices: A Leadership Training Handbook for Women (co-authored), Women's Learning Partnership, Bethesda, Maryland
- 1998 Safe and Secure: Eliminating Violence Against Women in Muslim Societies (co-authored), Sisterhood Is Global Institute, Bethesda, Maryland
- 1997 Muslim Women and The Politics of Participation (co-edited with Erika Friedl), Syracuse University Press, Syracuse, New York
- 1996 Claiming Our Rights: A Manual for Women's Human Rights Education in Muslim Societies (co-authored with Haleh Vaziri), Sisterhood Is Global Institute, Bethesda, Maryland
- 1995 Faith and Freedom: Women's Human Rights in the Muslim World, Syracuse University Press and I.B. Tauris
- 1994 Women and the Law in Iran (1967–1978) (compilation with introduction), Women's Center of the Foundation for Iranian Studies
- 1994 Women in Exile, University Press of Virginia
- 1994 In the Eye of the Storm: Women in Postrevolutionary Iran (edited with Erika Friedl), Syracuse University Press and I.B. Tauris
- 1992 Iran: A PreCollegiate Handbook (with Charlotte Albright), Foundation for Iranian Studies
- 1978 "Notes on the Curriculum and Materials for a Women's Studies Program for Iranian University Women"
  "Iran's National Plan of Action for Integration of Women in Development: Theory, Structure and Implementation"
  (manuscripts prepared for the Women's Organization of Iran Center for Research on Women, Tehran)

=== Chapters (selected) ===
- "Women's Human Rights in Iran: From Global Declarations to Local Implementation", in Women and Girls Rising: Progress and Resistance Around the World, edited by Ellen Chesler and Terry McGovern. Routledge Global Institutions, New York and UK, 2016.
- "Foreword: Sunlight, Open Windows, and Fresh Air: The Struggle for Women's Rights in Iran", in Shirin Nehsat: Facing History by Melissa Ho, Smithsonian Books, 2015.
- "Rights of Passage: Women Shaping the 21st Century," in The Future of Women's Rights: Global Visions & Strategies, edited by Joanna Kerr, Ellen Sprenger, and Alison Symington. Zed Books, New York: 2004.
- "Women, Information Technology, and Human Development," in Middle Eastern Women on the Move, Woodrow Wilson International Center for Scholars, Middle East Project, 2003.
- "Epilogue: Our Shared Human Values" in To Mend the World edited Marjorie Agosín and Betty Jean Craige. White Pine Press, New York, 2002
- "The Women's Organization of Iran: Evolutionary Politics and Revolutionary Change," in Women in Iran From the Rise of Islam to the Islamic Republic, edited by Lois Beck & Guity Nashat. University of Illinois Press: 2002.
- "Gender Apartheid, Cultural Relativism, and Women's Human Rights in Muslim Societies," in Women, Gender, and Human Rights: A Global Perspective, edited by Marjorie Agosín, Rutgers University Press, 2001.
- "Cultural Relativism and Women's Human Rights," in Women and International Human Rights Law, edited by Kelly D. Askin and Dorean M. Koenig. Transnational Publishers, Inc., New York: 2000.
- "Gender Apartheid and the Discourse of Relativity of Rights in Muslim Societies," in Religious Fundamentalisms and the Human Rights of Women, edited by Courtney Howland. St. Martin's Press, New York: 1999.
- "A Vision of Gender in Culture" in Culture in Sustainable Development: Investing in Culture and Natural Endowments edited by Ismail Serageldin, Joan Martin-Brown. From a conference sponsored by the World Bank and the United Nations Educational, Scientific, and Cultural Organization (UNESCO). World Bank, 1999.
- "A Woman in Exile," in A Map of Hope, edited by Marjorie Agosin. Rutgers University Press: May 1999.
- "Towards Global Feminism: A Muslim Perspective," in Radically Speaking: Feminism Reclaimed, edited by Diane Bell and Renate Klein. Spinifex Press: 1996.
- "Identity and Culture: Women as Subjects and Agents of Cultural Change," in From Basic Needs to Basic Rights, The Institute for Women, Law, and Development: 1996.
- "Middle Eastern Women and Human Rights," in Women, Culture and Society: A Reader. Kendall/Hunt Publishing Company: 1994.

=== Articles (selected) ===
- "Women, Rights, and Security in Iran," (in German and English) in Der Tagesspiegel, American Academy in Berlin, September 2008.
- "Rights of Passage: Women Shaping the 21st Century," Occasional Paper No.7, Association for Women's Rights in Development, October 2002.
- "Human Security: A Conversation," in Social Research. The New School, New York: Vol. 69, No. 3, Fall 2002.
- "Our Shared Humane Values," In Touch, Women of Washington, Los Angeles & Orange County, April 2001, Vol.8. No.4.
- "At the Crossroads of Tradition & Modernity: Personal Reflection," SAIS Review, The Johns Hopkins University Press, Summer-Fall 2000, Vol. XX, No. 2.
- "Beijing and Muslim Women," in Muslim Politics Report, Council on Foreign Relations: November/December 1995.
- In Persian: "Evolutionary Politics and Revolutionary Change," Iran Nameh, (Summer 1997). "What is Modern in the Contemporary Poetry of Iran," Jahan Now, Tehran, 1972. "Influence of the Haiku on Modern American Poetry," Jahan Now, Tehran, 1971.

== See also ==
- List of Iranian women activists
- List of Muslim feminists
