= Nasrin Soltankhah =

Iranian politician

- نسرین سلطان‌خواه
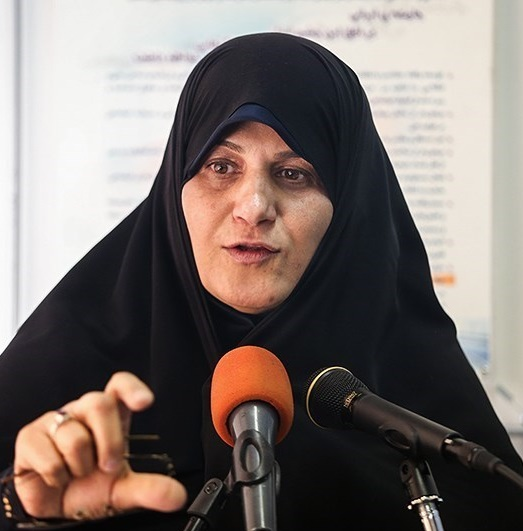
- Soltankhah in 2015

Vice President of Iran Head of National Elites Foundation
- In office 21 September 2009 – 5 October 2013
- President: Mahmoud Ahmadinejad
- Preceded by: Sadegh Vaez-Zadeh
- Succeeded by: Sorena Sattari

Head of Center for Women and Family Affairs
- In office 25 September 2005 – 21 February 2006
- President: Mahmoud Ahmadinejad
- Preceded by: Zahra Shojaei
- Succeeded by: Zohreh Tabibzadeh-Nouri

Member of City Council of Tehran
- In office 29 April 2003 – 29 April 2007

Personal details
- Born: 10 April 1963 (age 63) Tehran, Iran
- Party: Coalition of the Pleasant Scent of Servitude
- Other political affiliations: Alliance of Builders of Islamic Iran
- Awards: Order of Merit and Management (2nd class)

Nasrin Soltankhah (Persian: نسرین سلطان‌خواه) is an Iranian politician who was a Vice President under Mahmoud Ahmadinejad from 2009 to 2013.

== Education ==
Soltankhan received a Bachelor of Science in Mathematics (1976), a Master of Science in Mathematics (1978), and a PhD in Mathematics (1994) from Sharif University of Technology.

== Career ==
=== Cabinet position ===
Soltankhan, as a member of the Coalition of the Pleasant Scent of Servitude and belonging to the Professors’ Basij, was supported when she ran for parliament by the Basijis. She was appointed as a non-ministerial member to the Iranian Cabinet on September 25, 2005 by President Mahmoud Ahmadinejad. She was also president of Iran's National Elites Foundation.

=== Center for Women and Family Affairs ===
Soltankhan's portfolio included both the position as head of the Center for Women and Family Affairs (formerly called the Center for Women's Participation, or CWP)and also the position of advisor to the President on issues pertaining to women.

Soltankhan has mentioned three main points for women-related policies which the center will be focusing on. These are, “upholding human dignity of women regardless of their gender,“ “capitalizing on women’s potentials in managerial and decision-making arenas,“ and “emphasizing on women’s key role in families.“ Soltankhah also stated that the center is engaged in directing women’s capabilities into different social and cultural fields as well as generating jobs for them.

=== Political affiliation ===
Soltankhan is a member of the conservative political organization called the Alliance of Builders of Islamic Iran.

=== City Council of Tehran ===
Apart from her work in the executive branch of the Iranian government, Soltankhan was also on the City Council of Tehran having won a seat in 2003. The term of service for her council seat ended in 2007.

== See also ==
- Persian women
- List of Iranian women politicians

Government offices
Preceded by Sadeq Vaeez Zadeh	Head of National Elites Foundation; 2009–2013	Succeeded by Sorena Sattari
Preceded by Zahra Shojaei as Head of Center for Women's Participation Affairs	Head of Center for Women and Family Affairs; 2005–2006	Succeeded by Zohreh Tabibzadeh-Nouri
