= List of current vice presidents and designated acting presidents =

This is a list of vice presidential or similar positions, and their current holders.

A vice president is a standalone office existing for deputizing or replacing a president. In other countries where the vice presidency is absent or vacant, a separate office or series of offices may instead be designated ex officio to act as head of state, for example the chairperson of a legislature, a head of government or a dormant commission.

== Generally recognized sovereign states ==
=== Countries with a vice president (or similar position) ===
Country	Position	Incumbent(s)	Since
Afghanistan	Deputy Leader	Sirajuddin Haqqani (First)	15 August 2021
Afghanistan	Deputy Leader	Mullah Yaqoob (Second)	15 August 2021
Afghanistan	Deputy Leader	Abdul Ghani Baradar (Third)	15 August 2021
Angola	Vice President	Esperança da Costa	15 September 2022
Argentina	Vice President	Victoria Villarruel	10 December 2023
Azerbaijan	Vice President	Mehriban Aliyeva (Note: Current First Lady of Azerbaijan, as the wife of President Ilham Aliyev)	21 February 2017
Benin	Vice President	Mariam Chabi Talata	24 May 2021
Bolivia	Vice President	Edmand Lara	8 November 2025
Botswana	Vice-President	Ndaba Gaolathe	7 November 2024
Brazil	Vice President	Geraldo Alckmin	1 January 2023
Bulgaria	Vice President	Vacant	23 January 2026
Burundi	Vice President	Prosper Bazombanza	24 June 2020
China	Vice President	Han Zheng	10 March 2023
Colombia	Vice President	José Manuel Restrepo	7 August 2026
Costa Rica	Vice Presidents	Francisco Gamboa (First)	8 May 2026
Costa Rica	Vice Presidents	Douglas Soto (Second)	8 May 2026
Cuba	Vice President	Salvador Valdés Mesa	10 October 2019
Cyprus	Vice President	Vacant	15 July 1974 (Note: The position of Vice President of Cyprus, reserved for a Turkish Cypriot by the constitution, has been vacant since the 1974 Cypriot coup d'état and remains unfilled due to the Turkish invasion of Cyprus. Due to the constitutional power-sharing system between Greek and Turkish Cypriots, the president and vice president of Cyprus are substituted by the president and vice president of the House of Representatives respectively (as the "number two" posts within their own confessional group), and vacancies are filled using a by-election instead of a succession to office.)
Dominican Republic	Vice President	Raquel Peña	16 August 2020
Ecuador	Vice President	María José Pinto	24 May 2025
Egypt	Vice President	Vacant	14 August 2013
El Salvador	Vice President	Félix Ulloa	1 June 2019
Equatorial Guinea	Vice Presidents	Teodoro Nguema Obiang Mangue (First)	22 June 2016
Equatorial Guinea	Vice Presidents	Vacant (Second)	22 June 2016
Gabon	Vice President	Alexandre Barro Chambrier	1 January 2026
Gambia	Vice President	Muhammad B.S. Jallow	24 February 2023
Ghana	Vice President	Jane Naana Opoku-Agyemang	7 January 2025
Guatemala	Vice President	Karin Herrera	15 January 2024
Guyana	Vice Presidents	Mark Phillips (First) (Note: Also serves as Prime Minister.)	2 August 2020
Guyana	Vice Presidents	Bharrat Jagdeo (Second)	2 August 2020
Honduras	Vice Presidents	María Antonieta Mejía (First)	27 January 2026
Honduras	Vice Presidents	Carlos Flores Guifarro (Second)	27 January 2026
Honduras	Vice Presidents	Diana Herrera (Third)	27 January 2026
India	Vice President	C. P. Radhakrishnan	12 September 2025
Indonesia	Vice President	Vacant	12 November 2026
Iran	Vice Presidents	Mohammad Reza Aref (First Vice-President)	28 July 2024
Iran	Vice Presidents	Aladdin Rafizadeh (Vice-President and Head of Administrative and Recruitment Affairs Organisation)	17 September 2024
Iran	Vice Presidents	Majid Ansari (Vice-President for Legal Affairs)	22 August 2024
Iran	Vice Presidents	Mohsen Esmaeili (Vice-President for Parliamentary Affairs)	15 April 2025
Iran	Vice Presidents	Hossein Afshin (Vice-President for Science and Technology Affairs)	10 August 2024
Iran	Vice Presidents	Zahra Behrouz Azar (Vice-President for Women and Family Affairs)	10 August 2024
Iran	Vice Presidents	Mohammad Eslami (Vice-President and Head of Atomic Energy Organization)	29 August 2021
Iran	Vice Presidents	Saeed Ohadi (Vice-President and Head of Foundation of Martyrs and Veterans Affairs)	10 August 2024
Iran	Vice Presidents	Shina Ansari (Vice-President and Head of Department of Environment)	22 August 2024
Iran	Vice Presidents	Mohammad Ja'far Ghaempanah (Vice-President for Executive Affairs)	1 August 2024
Iraq	Vice Presidents	Vacant	2 October 2018
Iraq	Vice Presidents	Vacant	2 October 2018
Iraq	Vice Presidents	Vacant	2 October 2018
Ivory Coast	Vice President	Tiémoko Meyliet Koné	19 April 2022
Kazakhstan	Vice President	Erlan Karin	31 August 2026
Kenya	Deputy President	Kithure Kindiki	1 November 2024
Kiribati	Vice President	Vacant	15 November 2026
Laos	Vice President	Viengthong Siphandone	23 March 2026
Liberia	Vice President	Jeremiah Koung	22 January 2024
Libya	Vice-Chairmen of the Presidential Council	Abdullah al-Lafi	15 March 2021
Libya	Vice-Chairmen of the Presidential Council	Musa Al-Koni	15 March 2021
Malawi	Vice-President	Jane Ansah	4 October 2025
Maldives	Vice President	Hussain Mohamed Latheef	17 November 2023
Mauritius	Vice President	Robert Hungley	7 December 2024
Micronesia	Vice President	Aren Palik	13 September 2022
Myanmar	Vice Presidents	Nyo Saw (First)	10 April 2026
Myanmar	Vice Presidents	Nan Ni Ni Aye (Second)	10 April 2026
Namibia	Vice President	Lucia Witbooi	22 March 2025
Nauru	Vice President	Lionel Aingimea	16 April 2026
Nepal	Vice President	Ram Sahaya Yadav	20 March 2023
Nicaragua	Vice President	Vacant	30 January 2025
Niger	Vice President of the CNSP	Salifou Modi	26 July 2023
Nigeria	Vice President	Kashim Shettima	29 May 2023
Palau	Vice President	Raynold Oilouch	16 January 2025
Palestine	Vice President	Hussein al-Sheikh	26 April 2025
Panama	Vice President	Vacant	1 July 2024
Paraguay	Vice President	Antonio Barrios	6 November 2026
Peru	Vice Presidents	Luis Galarreta (First) (Note: Also serves as Prime Minister.)	28 July 2026
Peru	Vice Presidents	Miki Torres (Second) (Note: Also serves as President of the Senate.)	28 July 2026
Philippines	Vice President	Sara Duterte	30 June 2022
Samoa	Council of Deputies	Malietoa Mōli II	7 January 2025
Samoa	Council of Deputies	Tiatia Laulu Mapusua	7 January 2025
Samoa	Council of Deputies	Tui Ātua Tupua Tamasese Efi	7 January 2025
Seychelles	Vice President	Sebastien Pillay	28 October 2025
Sierra Leone	Vice President	Mohamed Juldeh Jalloh	14 April 2018
South Africa	Deputy President	Paul Mashatile	6 March 2023
South Sudan	Vice Presidents	Riek Machar (First)	21 February 2020
South Sudan	Vice Presidents	James Wani Igga (Second)	17 November 2025
South Sudan	Vice Presidents	Taban Deng Gai (Third)	21 February 2020
South Sudan	Vice Presidents	Rebecca Nyandeng De Mabior (Fourth)	21 February 2020
South Sudan	Vice Presidents	Hussein Abdelbagi (Fifth)	26 February 2026
Sudan	Deputy Chairman of the Transitional Sovereignty Council	Malik Agar	19 May 2023
Suriname	Vice President	Gregory Rusland	16 July 2025
Switzerland	Vice President	Ignazio Cassis	1 January 2026
Syria	Vice President	Vacant	8 December 2024
Tanzania	Vice President	Deogratius Ndejembi	9 September 2026
Turkey	Vice President	Cevdet Yılmaz	4 June 2023
Uganda	Vice President	Jessica Alupo	21 June 2021
United Arab Emirates	Vice Presidents	Mohammed bin Rashid Al Maktoum	11 February 2006
United Arab Emirates	Vice Presidents	Mansour bin Zayed Al Nahyan	29 March 2023
United States	Vice President	JD Vance	20 January 2025
Uruguay	Vice President	Carolina Cosse	1 March 2025
Venezuela	Vice President	Vacant	5 January 2026
Vietnam	Vice President	Võ Thị Ánh Xuân	6 April 2021
Yemen	Deputy Chairman of the Presidential Leadership Council (Aden)	Tareq Saleh; Sultan Ali al-Arada; Abed al-Rahman Abu Zara’a; Abdullah al-Alimi Bawazeer; Othman Hussein Megali; Faraj Salmin al-Buhsani	7 April 2022
Zambia	Vice President	Mutale Nalumango	24 August 2021
Zimbabwe	Vice Presidents	Constantino Chiwenga (First)	28 December 2017
Zimbabwe	Vice Presidents	Kembo Mohadi (Second)	8 September 2023

=== Countries with a designated acting head of state ===
Country	Position(s) designated to act as head of state	Incumbent(s)	Since
Albania	Speaker of the Parliament	Niko Peleshi	12 September 2025
Algeria	President of the Council of the Nation	Azouz Nasri	19 May 2025
Armenia	President of the National Assembly	Ruben Rubinyan	3 August 2026
Armenia	Prime Minister (if the above cannot exercise their duties)	Nikol Pashinyan	8 May 2018
Austria	Presidium of the National Council	Walter Rosenkranz (President); Peter Haubner (Second President); Doris Bures (Third President)	24 October 2024
Barbados	President of the Senate (for suspensions from office during impeachment proceedings)	Reginald Farley	15 September 2020
Belarus	Prime Minister	Alexander Turchin	10 March 2025
Cameroon	Prime Minister (for temporary absences)	Joseph Ngute	4 January 2019
Cameroon	President of the Senate (for presidential vacancies)	Aboubakary Abdoulaye	17 March 2026
Cape Verde	President of the National Assembly	Janira Hopffer Almada	15 September 2026
Central African Republic	President of the National Assembly	Simplice Sarandji	5 May 2021
Chile	Minister of the Interior and Public Security	Claudio Alvarado	11 March 2026
Comoros	Governor of the island currently holding the presidency (Note: Only eligible if the incumbent president has remained in office for more than nine hundred days.)	Ibrahim Mze Mohamed (Governor of Grande Comore)	2024
Congo, Democratic Republic of the	President of the Senate	Sama Lukonde	12 August 2024
Congo, Republic of the	President of the Senate	Pierre Ngolo	12 September 2017
Congo, Republic of the	President of the National Assembly (if the above cannot exercise their duties)	Isidore Mvouba	19 August 2017
Congo, Republic of the	Prime Minister (if neither of the above can exercise their duties)	Anatole Collinet Makosso	12 May 2021
Croatia	Speaker of Parliament	Gordan Jandroković	5 May 2017
Cyprus	President of the House of Representatives	Annita Demetriou	10 June 2021
Czech Republic	Speaker of the Chamber of Deputies; Prime Minister	Tomio Okamura; Andrej Babiš	5 November 2025; 9 December 2025
Djibouti	Prime Minister (for temporary absences)	Abdoulkader Kamil Mohamed	1 April 2013
Djibouti	President of the Supreme Court (for presidential vacancies)	Djama Souleiman Ali	October 2024
East Timor	President of National Parliament	Maria Fernanda Lay	22 June 2023
Egypt	Prime Minister (for temporary absences) (Note: Only eligible if there is no vice president or the office is vacant.)	Mostafa Madbouly	14 June 2018
Egypt	Speaker of the House of Representatives (for presidential vacancies) (Note: If parliament has been dissolved, this role is instead delegated to the Chief Justice of the Supreme Constitutional Court.)	Hisham Badawy	12 January 2026
Eritrea	Chairman of the National Assembly	Isaias Afwerki (Note: Isaias Afwerki is also the President of Eritrea.)	1 February 1994
Estonia	Speaker of the Riigikogu	Lauri Hussar	10 April 2023
France	President of the Senate	Gérard Larcher	1 October 2014
Fiji	Chief Justice	Salesi Temo	24 December 2024 (acting from 30 January 2023)
Finland	Prime Minister	Petteri Orpo	20 June 2023
Georgia	Chairperson of the Parliament	Shalva Papuashvili	29 December 2021
Germany	President of the Bundesrat	Hendrik Wüst	1 November 2026
Greece	President of the Hellenic Parliament	Nikitas Kaklamanis	22 January 2025
Guinea	President of the National Assembly	Dansa Kourouma	5 February 2022
Guinea-Bissau	President of the National People's Assembly	Vacant	4 December 2023
Hungary	Speaker of the National Assembly	Ágnes Forsthoffer	9 May 2026
Iceland	Prime Minister; Speaker of the Alþing; President of the Supreme Court	Kristrún Frostadóttir; Þórunn Sveinbjarnardóttir; Benedikt Bogason	21 December 2024; 4 February 2025; 1 September 2020
Iraq	Speaker of the Council of Representatives	Haibat al-Halbousi	29 December 2025
Ireland	Presidential Commission	Donal O'Donnell (Chief Justice); Mark Daly (Cathaoirleach); Verona Murphy (Ceann Comhairle)	11 October 2021; 12 February 2025; 18 December 2024
Israel	Acting President (for temporary absences)	Matan Kahana (Speaker of the Knesset)	17 November 2026
Israel	Interim President (for presidential vacancies)	Matan Kahana (Speaker of the Knesset)	17 November 2026
Italy	President of the Senate	Ignazio La Russa	13 October 2022
Ivory Coast	Prime Minister (Note: Only eligible if the vice president is unable to exercise their duties.)	Robert Beugré Mambé	17 October 2023
Kyrgyzstan	Speaker of the Supreme Council	Marlen Mamataliev	12 February 2026
Latvia	Speaker of the Saeima	Edvards Smiltēns	3 November 2026
Lithuania	Speaker of the Seimas	Juozas Olekas	10 September 2025
Madagascar	President of the Senate	Vacant	14 October 2025
Malaysia	Deputy Yang di-Pertuan Agong	Nazrin Shah of Perak (Sultan of Perak) (Note: Just like the Yang di-Pertuan Agong, the Deputy Yang di-Pertuan Agong is elected among nine Malay rulers once every five years. However, this position is not term-limited.)	13 December 2016
Malta	Speaker of the House of Representatives (Note: An alternative acting president may be designated by the Prime Minister of Malta.)	Carmelo Abela	20 June 2026
Mauritania	President of the National Assembly	Mohamed Ould Meguett	19 June 2023
Mexico	Secretary of the Interior (Note: The Secretary of the Interior may only serve as acting head of state until an Interim or Substitute President is elected by Congress. If the President voluntarily requests a temporary absence and it is accepted by the Congress of the Union, the Secretary of the Interior may assume executive powers for a period of up to 60 days.)	Rosa Icela Rodríguez	1 October 2024
Mexico	President of the Senate (Note: Only eligible if the absence occurs due to a president having failed to take office before the end of a sexenio. May only serve as acting head of state until an Interim President is elected by Congress.)	Higinio Martínez	1 September 2026
Mexico	President of the Chamber of Deputies (Note: Only eligible if the absence occurs due to a recall election. May only serve as acting head of state until a Substitute President is elected by Congress.)	Raúl Bolaños Cacho Cué	1 September 2026
Moldova	President of the Parliament	Igor Grosu	29 July 2021
Moldova	Prime Minister (if the above cannot exercise their duties)	Vasile Tofan	22 July 2026
Mongolia	Chairman of the State Great Khural	Sandagiin Byambatsogt	3 April 2026
Montenegro	President of the Parliament	Andrija Mandić	30 October 2023
Mozambique	President of the Assembly of the Republic	Margarida Talapa	13 January 2025
North Macedonia	President of the Assembly	Afrim Gashi	28 May 2024
Pakistan	Chairman of the Senate	Yusuf Raza Gilani	9 April 2024
Poland	Marshal of the Sejm	Włodzimierz Czarzasty	18 November 2025
Portugal	President of the Assembly of the Republic	José Pedro Aguiar-Branco	27 March 2024
Romania	President of the Senate	Mircea Abrudean	24 June 2025
Russia	Prime Minister	Mikhail Mishustin	16 January 2020
Rwanda	President of the Senate	François-Xavier Kalinda	9 January 2023
Rwanda	President of the Chamber of Deputies (if the above cannot exercise their duties)	Gertrude Kazarwa	14 August 2024
Rwanda	Prime Minister (if neither of the above can exercise their duties)	Justin Nsengiyumva	25 July 2025
São Tomé and Príncipe	President of the National Assembly	Abnildo do Nascimento d'Oliveira	12 February 2026
Senegal	President of the National Assembly	Ousmane Sonko	26 May 2026
Serbia	President of the National Assembly	Aleksandar Čupić	19 November 2026
Singapore	Chairman of the Council of Presidential Advisers	Tan Chong Meng	1 June 2026
Singapore	Speaker of the Parliament (if the above cannot exercise their duties)	Seah Kian Peng	2 August 2023
Slovakia	Speaker of the National Council; Prime Minister	Richard Raši; Robert Fico	26 March 2025; 25 October 2023
Slovenia	Speaker of the National Assembly	Zoran Stevanović	10 April 2026
Somalia	President of the House of the People	Abdulkadir Mohamed Nur	10 August 2026
Sri Lanka	Prime Minister	Harini Amarasuriya	24 September 2024
Tajikistan	Chairman of the National Assembly	Rustam Emomali	17 April 2020
Togo	President of the National Assembly	Kodjo Adedze	14 June 2024
Trinidad and Tobago	President of the Senate	Wade Mark	23 May 2025
Tunisia	Prime Minister	Sara Zaafarani	21 March 2025
Turkmenistan	Speaker of the Assembly	Dünýägözel Gulmanowa	6 April 2023
Ukraine	Chairperson of the Verkhovna Rada	Ruslan Stefanchuk	8 October 2021
Vatican City (Note: By terms of the apostolic constitution Universi Dominici gregis, the Camerlengo of the Holy Roman Church is charged with "safeguarding and administering the goods and temporal rights of the Holy See" during a sede vacante (period of vacancy after a pope's death or resignation), making him the de facto designated acting sovereign.)	Camerlengo of the Holy Roman Church	Kevin Farrell	14 February 2019
Vanuatu	Speaker of the Parliament	Stephen Dorrick Felix	11 February 2025
Venezuela	Vice President	Delcy Rodríguez	4 January 2026

== States recognized by some United Nations member states ==
=== Countries with a vice president ===
Country	Position	Incumbent	Since
Abkhazia	Vice President	Beslan Bigvava	2 April 2025
Republic of China (Taiwan)	Vice President	Hsiao Bi-khim	20 May 2024

=== Countries with a designated acting head of state ===
Country	Position(s) designated to act as head of state	Incumbent	Since
Kosovo	Speaker of the Assembly	Albulena Haxhiu	9 September 2026
Northern Cyprus	Speaker of the Assembly of the Republic	Ziya Öztürkler	21 October 2024
South Ossetia	Prime Minister	Soslan Margiev	30 September 2026
South Ossetia	Speaker of the Parliament (if the above cannot exercise their duties)	Alan Margiev	24 June 2024
Sahrawi Arab Democratic Republic	President of the Sahrawi National Council	Bashir Mustafa Sayed	28 March 2026

== States recognized by no United Nations member states ==
=== Countries with a vice president ===
Country	Position	Incumbent	Since
Somaliland	Vice President	Mohamed Aw-Ali Abdi	12 December 2024

=== Countries with a designated acting head of state ===
Country	Position(s) designated to act as head of state	Incumbent	Since
Transnistria	Prime Minister	Aleksandr Rozenberg	30 May 2022

== Alternative governments ==
=== Alternative governments with a vice president (or similar position) ===
Government	Position	Incumbent(s)	Since
National Unity Government of Myanmar	Vice President	Duwa Lashi La	16 April 2021
Supreme Political Council of Yemen	Deputy Head of the Supreme Political Council (Sana'a)	Qassem Labozah	14 August 2016

== See also ==
- List of current heads of state and government
- List of current presidents of legislatures
- List of current prime ministers by date of assumption of office
- List of elected or appointed female deputy heads of state
- Lists of office-holders
