= Othman Hussein Megali =

Yemeni politician

- عثمان حسين مجلي
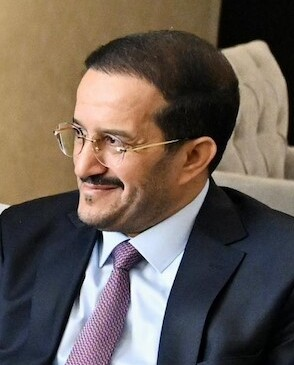
- Megali in 2024

Member of the Presidential Leadership Council
- Incumbent
- Assumed office 7 April 2022
- Chairman: Rashad al-Alimi

Member of the House of Representatives
- Incumbent
- Assumed office 27 April 1997
- President: Ali Abdullah Saleh; Abdrabbuh Mansour Hadi; Rashad al-Alimi

Minister of Agriculture and Irrigation
- In office 24 December 2017 – 17 December 2020
- President: Abdrabbuh Mansour Hadi
- Preceded by: Farid Ahmed Mujawar
- Succeeded by: Salem al-Soqotri

Minister of State for Parliamentary and Shura Council Affairs
- In office 9 January 2016 – 24 December 2017
- President: Abdrabbuh Mansour Hadi

Personal details
- Born: 1970 (age 55–56) Sahar district, Saada Governorate, Yemen Arab Republic
- Party: General People's Congress

Military service
- Allegiance: Yemen
- Years of service: 2000s–2011
- Commands: Sheikh of the al-Abdin tribe
- Battles/wars: Houthi insurgency; Battle of Saada (AWOL)

Othman Hussein Fayed Megali (Note: Arabic: عثمان حسين فايد مجلي) (born 1970) is a Yemeni politician and tribal leader who has served as a member of the Presidential Leadership Council since its formation in 2022. Hailing from an influential tribe in Saada Governorate, he has been a House of Representatives member since 1997. He is known as a prominent tribal leader opposed to the Houthis, fighting against them during their insurgency. In 2011, he fled to Saudi Arabia as the Houthis captured the city of Saada, eventually returning in 2013. After the Houthi takeover in Yemen and subsequent civil war, he has resided primarily in Saudi Arabia, operating as an influential member of the anti-Houthi bloc and General People's Congress. He served as Minister of State for Parliamentary and Shura Council Affairs and Minister of Agriculture prior to joining the PLC.

== Biography ==
=== Early life and career ===
Megali was born in 1970 in the al-Abdeen area of Sahar district in Saada Governorate to a prominent tribal family noted for their resistance to the Zaidi imamate. His grandfather, Fayed Megali, participated in the al-Waziri coup attempt of 1948 and another attempted coup in 1955, both of which ended in his arrest, before participating in the North Yemen civil war on the side of the republicans. His father, Hussein Fayez Megali, participated in the assassination of a Zaidi imam in 1969 during the civil war.

At an early age, Megali moved to the United Kingdom on the directive of his father in order for him to learn English, living with a British family with whom his father had business relations with. He eventually returned to Saada to continue his basic education, and later moved to the capital of Sanaa to join the Police College. He graduated from the college in 1994 and, with a bachelor's degree in Sharia and law, proceeded to work as a police officer as part of the Criminal Investigative Department in Saada. Utilizing the political influence of his family and tribe, Megali entered politics in 1997, when he was elected to the House of Representatives as an independent candidate representing Sahar district after defeating the Islah candidate. He won the seat again in the 2003 election after having joined the ruling General People's Congress, and has retained it ever since.

=== Houthi conflict ===
After the death of his father, Megali inherited his leadership of the al-Abdin tribe, part of the larger Khawlan bin Amer tribal confederation in Saada. Through this position, Megali became one of the most influential tribal sheikhs in Saada and Yemen at large. During the Houthi insurgency, Megali sided with the government and emerged as one of their most prominent opponents. During a round of fighting in early 2010, the Houthis attacked his house, killing his son and wounding four other civilians.

Heavy clashes broke out on the outskirts of Saada city in January 2011 between the Houthis and al-Abdin fighters led by Megali. Weeks later, protests part of the Yemeni revolution began spreading across the country, including Saada, as Houthi forces proceeded to besiege Megali and his followers. Megali sensed that the Houthis would utilize the chaotic political situation to seize territory in the north, and thus stayed in Saada city to protect it. After the massacre of demonstrators in Sanaa on 18 March, officials in Saada deserted the governorate to escape the enraged protestors, as the Houthis proceeded to move in on Saada. Fearing the Houthis would attempt to capture him, Megali and a group of associates escaped the Houthi siege on 24 March and fled Saada to the bordering Najran in Saudi Arabia, where he received an offer by Saudi officials to host him in Jeddah. As the Houthis proceeded to consolidate control over Saada, they destroyed his home and family properties.

In 2013, amidst the National Dialogue Conference which the Houthis were participating in, Megali returned to Yemen from Saudi Arabia. He proceeded to engage in strengthening anti-Houthi forces in several contested fronts, such as in Dammaj. His younger brother died as part of the security forces defending Amran from a Houthi offensive in 2014. As the Houthis continued their advances in the north, Megali failed to convince former president Ali Abdullah Saleh, who he shared friendly relations with, to break off his alliance with the group.

=== Yemeni civil war ===
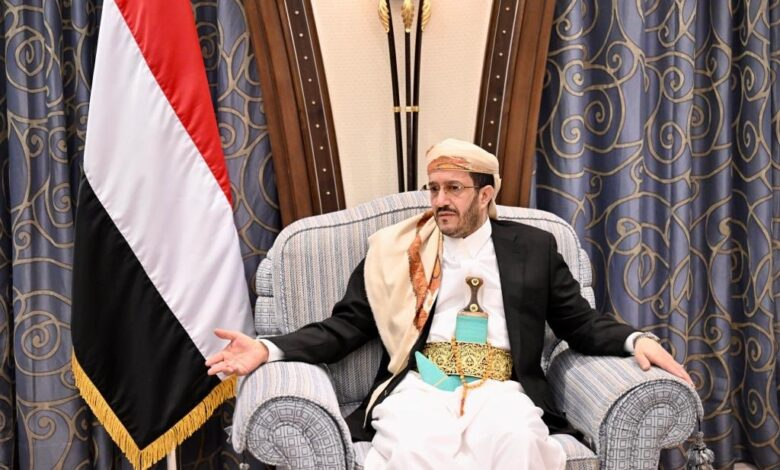
Megali in 2023

By the time the Houthis invaded Sanaa in September 2014, Megali had returned to Saudi Arabia and was living in Riyadh. His relationship with Saleh frayed following this point. Through his strong network of relationships in Yemen, Megali is believed to have convinced numerous tribal leaders to support the Yemeni government in fighting the Houthis during the Yemeni civil war, and was involved in the establishment of anti-Houthi units in several governorates, including Saada, to open up a front along the Saudi border. The Houthis accused Megali of having played a role in convincing Saudi officials to intervene in the civil war, due to his historical relations with Saudi Arabia.

During the Geneva Conference on Yemen in July 2015, Megali represented the Yemeni government under President Abdrabbuh Mansour Hadi. A presidential decree issued on 9 January 2016 appointed him a Minister of State for Parliamentary and Shura Council Affairs. As part of a cabinet reshuffle under Prime Minister Ahmed Obaid Bin Dagher, Megali was transferred from this position to the Minister of Agriculture on 24 December 2017. By this time, he had become a highly influential figure within the pro-government faction of the General People's Congress, while facing criticism from Islah. He was part of a team representing the government in United Nations-mediated negotiations with the Houthis in 2018 regarding the status of the Sanaa International Airport.

=== Presidential Leadership Council ===
Megali was appointed a member of the Presidential Leadership Council upon its formation on 7 April 2022. Among the eight members, he was among four who hailed from northern Yemen, while the rest were southerners. As part of a Yemeni government delegation participating in the UN Least Developed Nations summit at Qatar in March 2023, Megali accused Iran of contributing to the humanitarian crisis in Yemen through their support for the Houthis. In his speech, he condemned the "terrorist and racist movements created by Iran in the Arab countries to spread chaos and control the region", with the Yemeni delegation later walking out of the summit as their Iranian counterparts took the podium.

United States ambassador to Yemen Steven Fagin conducted a meeting with Megali on 12 August 2024. During the meeting, Megali spoke of the Yemeni government's support for negotiations between the Saudi-led coalition and the Houthis. He later accompanied President Rashad al-Alimi and fellow PLC member Abdullah al-Alimi Bawazeer on an official visit to Taiz on 27 August, the first by a Yemeni president in nearly 15 years.
