= Capital of Yemen =

The capital of Yemen is disputed between two cities:

- Sana'a, the constitutional capital and seat of government for the Houthis
- Aden, the temporary capital declared by President Hadi in 2015
