= Consultation and Reconciliation Commission =

Yemeni governmental body

Agency overview
- Formed: 7 April 2022
- Jurisdiction: Government of Yemen

Consultation and Reconciliation Commission (Arabic: هيئة التشاور والمصالحة) is a Yemeni governmental body formed by President Abdrabbo Mansour Hadi on 7 April 2022. The commission's goal is to support the Presidential Leadership Council and work to unify the objectives of the various national forces and components.

== Membership ==
The commission is composed of fifty members led by Mohammed al-Ghaithi, head of the Southern Transitional Council's foreign affairs department; and vice-chairpersons Abdulmalik al-Mikhlafi, Sakhr Al-Wajeeh, Jamilah Ali Rajaa and Akram al-Amiri.

No	Member	Party	Notes
1	Mohammad Al-Ghaithi (chairman)		
2	Ahmed Al-Qumairi		
3	Ahmed Saleh Al-Essa		
4	Akram Nassib Al-Qadi		
5	Olfat Al-Dubai		
6	Anis Al-Sharafi		
7	Bilqis AbuOsba		
8	Jamilah Ali Rajaa		
9	Hussein Al-Aji Al-Awadi		
10	Hussein Mansour		
11	Hamid Al-Ahmar		
12	Rasha Jarhum		
13	Rana Ghanem		
14	Zaid Al Shami		
15	Salem Thabet Al-Awlaki		
16	Sultan Al-Atwani		
17	Sakhr Al-Wajeeh		
18	Abdul Rahman Al-Saqqaf		
19	Abdul Rahman Sheikh		
20	Abdul Razzaq Al-Hijri		
21	Abdullah Al Kathiri		
22	Abdullah Al-Nomani		
23	Abdullah Numan Al Qudsi		
24	Abdulmalik Al-Mikhlafi		a former adviser to ex-President Hadi
25	Abdel Nasser Mohammed Al-Khatri		
26	Abdel Wahab Moawadeh		
27	Abd Al-Wahed Al-Qibli Nimran		
28	Adnan Al-Kaf		
29	Ali Ashal		
30	Ali Al Kathiri		
31	Abdul Khaleq Bishr		
32	Ali Munser Muhammad Muqbel		
33	Fadl Al-Jaadi		
34	Fahad Dahshoush		
35	Fahad Kafain		
36	Qasim Alkasadi		
37	Mabkhout bin Madi		
38	Mohsen Basurrah		
39	Mohammed Ahmed Al-Mikhlafi		
40	Muhammed Ahmad Al-Zuwaidi		
41	Ibrahim Al-Shami		
42	Muhammed bin Adyo		
43	Muhammad Salih al-Qubati		
44	Muhammad Ali Al-Shaddadi		
45	Muhammad Naji Al-Shayef		
46	Murad Al-Halimi		
47	Mustafa al-Numan		
48	Nasser Al-Khubaji		
49	Nayef Al Bakri		
50	Nasr Taha Mustafa		

On an invitation from the head of the Presidential Leadership Council, the body elected its executive presidency from among its members in its first session.

== See also ==
- Presidential Leadership Council
