= Sultan Ali al-Aradah =

Yemeni politician

Sheikh Sultan Ali al-Aradah
- سلطان بن علي العرادة
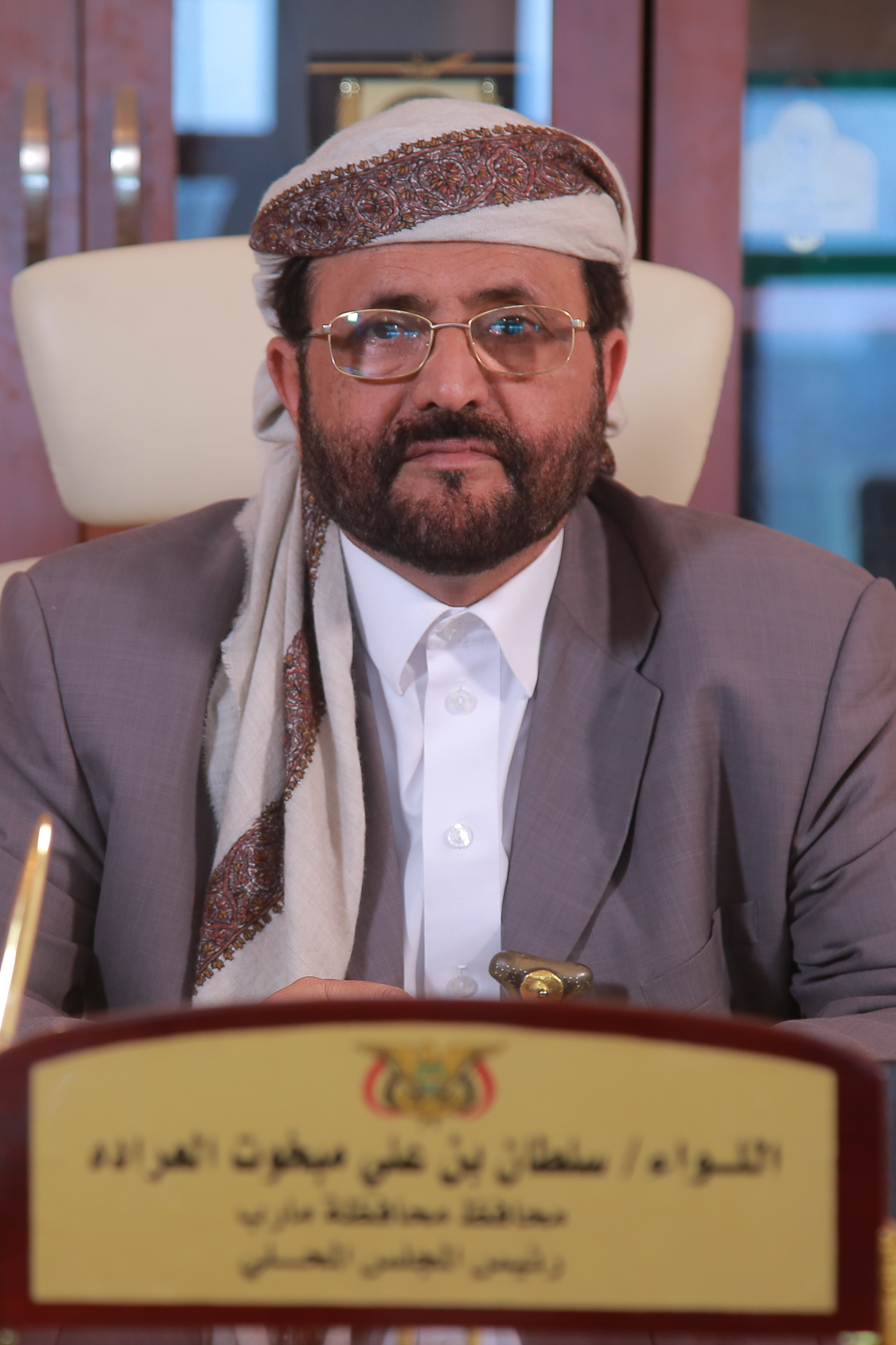

Deputy Chairman of the Presidential Leadership Council
- Incumbent
- Assumed office 7 April 2022
- Chairman: Rashad al-Alimi

Governor of Marib Governorate
- Incumbent
- Assumed office 6 April 2012
- Appointed by: Abdrabbuh Mansur Hadi

Member of the Yemeni House of Representatives
- In office 1993–2003

Member of the Shura Council
- In office 1987–1990

Personal details
- Born: 1958 (age 67–68) Kara village, Marib Governorate, Kingdom of Yemen (now Yemen)
- Party: General People's Congress (until 2003)
- Education: University of Sanaa

Military service
- Allegiance: Yemen
- Branch/service: Yemeni Land Forces
- Rank: Major General
- Battles/wars: Yemeni Civil War (2014–present): Marib campaign

Sultan Ali Al-Aradah (Arabic: سلطان بن علي العرادة; born 1959) is a Yemeni politician and general who has served as one of the 8 members of the Presidential Leadership Council since 2022. The PLC is the internationally recognized executive of Yemen. Aradah concurrently serves as the governor of Marib Governorate, having held that role since 2012.

== Biography ==
Aradah was born in 1958 in Kara village, Marib Governorate in what was then the Kingdom of Yemen. He is a graduate of Sanaa University. In the 1970s, Aradah, a Bedouin tribal sheikh, became associated with two presidents of the Yemen Arab Republic, Ibrahim al-Hamdi and Ali Abdullah Saleh, as part of their outreach towards tribal sheikhs. Saleh selected Arada to be part of a standing committee for the newly formed General People's Congress. In 1987, Aradah was appointed to the Shura Council, the upper house of the Parliament of Yemen.

In 1993, Aradah was elected to the Yemeni House of Representatives, following the reunification of the country, and he was re-elected in 1997. In 2003, Aradah broke from the General People's Congress and opted not to run for a third term. After leaving parliament, Aradah did not engage with national politics, instead playing a conciliatory role in tribal conflicts. However, in 2011, Aradah was a protester in the Yemeni Revolution, which saw the ousting of Saleh.

On 6 April 2012, Abdrabbuh Mansur Hadi, the newly elected president of Yemen, appointed Aradah as the governor of Marib Governorate. In this role, Arada, who is also a major general in the Yemeni Army, was at the forefront of the Yemeni Civil War; Marib Governorate was a major target for the opposition Houthi forces due to its richness in oil as well as its proximity to Houthi-controlled Sanaa. During Arada's tenure as governor, Marib saw large development at a time when the rest of Yemen was suffering from the civil war; new specially designed homes, restaurants, and a football pitch were built. Aradah also has close ties with the West, having visited New York City, Paris, and London in official capacity as governor, as well as sponsoring visas for several western journalists.

On 7 April 2022, Hadi announced that he would transfer his executive power as president to an 8-member body known as the Presidential Leadership Council, as part of the Yemeni peace process; Aradah was announced to be one of the members of the body, and has retained his governorship of Marib while on the council.

== Personal life ==
Several of Aradah's sons are soldiers in the Yemeni army, with one son dying in battle against the Houthis in Marib Governorate. One of Aradah's brothers has been named a specially designated terrorist by the United States for allegedly funding al-Qaeda operations.
