= Battle of Saada =

Battle of the Yemeni Revolution

- Part of the Houthi insurgency and the Yemeni revolution
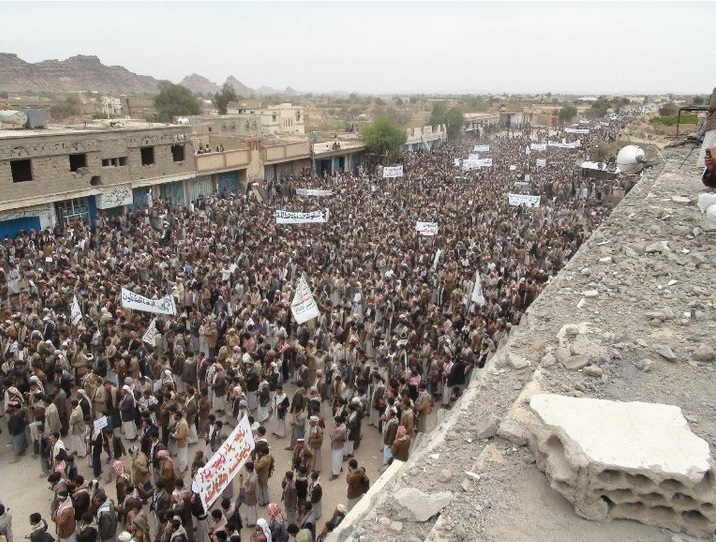
- Anti-government protests in Saada city, March 2011
Date	19–26 March 2011 (1 week)
Location	Saada city, Yemen
Result	Decisive Houthi victory
Territorial changes	Houthis take control of Saada governorate

Belligerents
Yemen: Al Abdin tribes; Security forces	Houthis: Army defectors; Anti-government protesters

Commanders and leaders
Taha Hajer; Uthman Mujalli	Abdullah Yahya al-Hakim; Fares Mana'a

Casualties and losses
- 45 killed

The battle of Saada was a military confrontation that erupted in March 2011 between Houthi rebels and tribal forces loyal to Yemeni President Ali Abdullah Saleh in the northern city of Saada. Following days of heavy clashes, the Houthis managed to capture the entire Saada Governorate including its provincial capital and established an independent administration, thereby marking the first such Yemeni governorate to fall out of central government control since the nationwide uprising began in 2011. After the takeover, Saada became known as a Houthi stronghold.

== Background ==
=== Houthi rebellion in Saada ===
For years, Saada had been a site of violent confrontations between the Yemeni government and rebels known as the Houthi movement. The conflict was sparked in June 2004 by Ali Abdullah Saleh's government's attempt to arrest Hussein Badreddin al-Houthi, the Zaydi religious leader who founded the Houthi movement and a former Al-Haqq parliamentarian, on whose head the government had placed a US$55,000 bounty.

Though the manhunt eventually led to the killing of Hussein Badreddin al-Houthi in September 2004, the conflict continued to rage for another six wars, known as the "Saada Wars", which lasted until 2010. With one of Hussein's brothers, Abdul Malik al-Houthi, succeeding him as the new Houthi leader, the movement transformed from a grassroots Zaydi religious revivalist network into a strong fighting insurgent force.

By 2009, Houthi rebels had also expanded their insurgency beyond Saada governorate, which took place at Saudi territories near the Saudi border. The Saudi Arabian military intervened in November 2009 to support the Yemeni government's actions against the Houthis. The war reached a protracted state in 2010, as the Houthi rebels were unable to gain control over any areas in Saada, but at the same time, the government forces were unable to subdue the rebellion. A few months later, a fragile truce brokered by Qatar was reached for all sides during the following year, which temporarily halted all fighting afterwards.

The conflict saw ceasefires being reached many times. A ceasefire, brokered in June 2007, was followed by a peace agreement in February 2008. By April 2008, however, the peace process was in jeopardy as each side of the conflict accused the other of failing to implement aspects of the peace agreement.

Analysts warned that the conflict would damage the humanitarian situation in the region. By mid-2010, it was estimated that there were 342,000 internally displaced persons (IDPs) in Saada as a result of the conflict.

=== The Yemeni uprising ===
In the wake of the Arab Spring, which saw rulers overthrown in Tunisia and Egypt, a nationwide uprising began building up in Yemen in January 2011. The Houthis declared their support for the uprising against Ali Abdullah Saleh, and large crowds of Houthi followers joined the anti-government protests on their 10th day. During February and March, thousands of protesters held weekly marches in Saada city from the gates of the old city to the security barracks of Saleh's army to demand the resignation of Ali Abdullah Saleh as Yemeni president.

Meanwhile, skirmishes broke out as early as January on the outskirts of Saada city between the Houthis and the Al Abdin tribe led by Sheikh Uthman Mujalli, a vocal anti-Houthi tribal leader. Mujalli was also a Salafi parliamentarian from Saada governorate representing the ruling General People's Congress (GPC) party. A few weeks after the clashes started, the student protest movement that began in the capital Sana'a soon spread to other parts of Yemen. Houthi rebels then began laying siege to Mujalli and his followers. The Saada provincial government later came under increasing pressure as anti-government protests grew, amid a gradual collapse of security.

== Storming of Saada ==
On 18 March, government snipers fired on a mass protest in the Yemeni capital Sana'a. Known as the "Karama Massacre", the event triggered nationwide outrage and a flood of defections from the government officials.

In response to the bloody event, Houthi rebels stormed Saada city next day on 19 March, allegedly blowing up houses and inflicting heavy civilian casualties. This led to a heavy conflict with the Al Abdin tribes in which 45 people were killed and 13 houses were destroyed. Houthis then attacked the Telmus military site which overlooks the city, capturing numerous machine guns, mortar shells, guns and tanks. The Houthis prevailed in the fighting and burned down Sheikh Mujalli's house, destroying all his possessions and seizing sixteen cars. Sheikh Mujalli and his followers were chased out from Saada as a result of his increasing local unpopularity there.

Saada governor Taha Hajer also fled the province to Sana'a and police deserted their posts, after which all the leaders of the Saada army headquarters handed over their military equipment and bases to the Houthi rebels. The armed defectors mostly consisted of troops from 1st Armoured Division led by Ali Mohsen al-Ahmar, who declared his support for the uprising as well.

By 26 March, Houthi rebels were in full control of the city, running all the government facilities and checkpoints, and controlling all entrances to the city. Saada became the first Yemeni provincial capital to have fallen from central government control since the beginning of the uprising.

== Aftermath ==
On 26 March, Houthi field commander Abdullah Yahya al-Hakim appointed Fares Manaa, one of the Middle East's most prominent arms dealers and a former ally to Saleh, as the governor of Saada. Manaa had broken with Saleh after he had been imprisoned by him for months in Sanaa, and he resigned from the GPC party in order to join forces with the Houthis, along with several other prominent Saada politicians. The Houthis later declared a separate administration, fully independent from the government of Yemen, consisting of rebels, residents and defected military commanders.

The Houthi takeover of Saada resulted in over four years of relative peace and stability in the governorate until the Yemeni civil war, in 2015.

Since then, Saada Governorate has become known as a Houthi stronghold where prominent leaders such as Abdulmalik al-Houthi are believed to be residing.

== See also ==
- Siege of Dammaj
- Houthi takeover in Yemen
