= Ali Mohsen al-Ahmar =

Yemeni general (born 1945)

- علي محسن صالح الأحمر
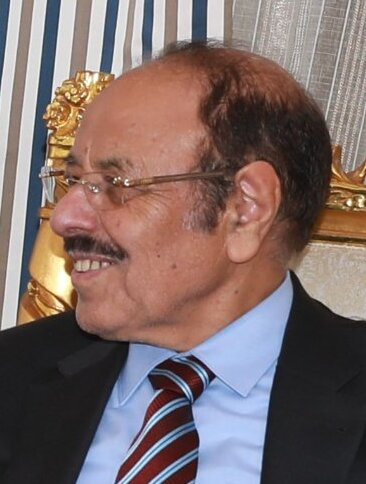
- Mohsen in 2020

4th Vice President of Yemen
- In office 4 April 2016 – 7 April 2022
- President: Abdrabbuh Mansur Hadi
- Preceded by: Khaled Bahah
- Succeeded by: Seven deputy chairmen of the Presidential Leadership Council, including Aidarus al-Zoubaidi and Tareq Saleh

Personal details
- Born: Ali Mohsen Saleh al-Ahmar; June 20, 1945 (age 80) Sanhan, Sana'a Governorate, North Yemen
- Party: General People's Congress
- Relations: Ali Abdullah Saleh (Distant cousin)

Military service
- Allegiance: Mutawakkilite Kingdom of Yemen (1961–1962); Yemen Arab Republic (1962–1990); Yemen (1990–2022)
- Branch/service: Yemen Army
- Years of service: 1961–2022
- Rank: Lieutenant general
- Commands: North-Western Military District 2011–2012; 1st Armoured Division 1987–2011
- Battles/wars: North Yemeni Civil War; First Yemenite War; NDF Rebellion; Second Yemenite War; Yemeni Civil War (1994); Houthi insurgency in Yemen; Yemeni Revolution; 2014 Sana'a coup d'état; Yemeni Civil War (2014–present)

Ali Mohsen Saleh al-Ahmar (Arabic: علي محسن صالح الأحمر, romanized: ʻAlī Muḥsin Ṣāliḥ al-Aḥmar; born 20 June 1945), sometimes spelled Muhsin, is a Yemeni military officer and politician who served as the vice president of Yemen from 2016 to 2022, when he was dismissed by President Abdrabbuh Mansur Hadi, who transferred the powers of the president and vice president to the Presidential Leadership Council. He is a lieutenant general in the Yemeni Army and was the commander of the northwestern military district and the 1st Armoured Division. He played a leading role in the creation of the General People's Congress party.

He was appointed as a Deputy Supreme Commander of Yemeni Armed Forces on February 22, 2016. After that President Hadi appointed him Vice President of Yemen on April 3, 2016. This assignment created a large controversy between opponents and supporters, but most of them considered it a strong message from President Hadi and the Saudi-led coalition for the intention of using the military to regain control of the capital. This was possible because of the flexible and strong relationship Mohsen had with figures from the tribes surrounding the capital Sanaa, and some military commanders who will be loyal to the government because of this assignment.

== Early life and education ==
Born in Sanhan, a southeastern suburb of Sana'a, he received his primary and secondary education there. He is not a member of the al-Ahmar immediate ruling family of the Hashid tribe.

=== Military training ===
Ali Mohsen al-Ahmar joined the 4th Military brigade of the Army of the Kingdom of Yemen in 1961. He was promoted as a first lieutenant in the Mechanized forces of the Army of the Yemen Arab Republic in 1968, and participated in the North Yemen Civil War from 1962 to 1967, fighting on the Republican side. Then he joined the Yemen Military Academy in 1971 and got his bachelor's degree in 1974. After his graduation from Yemen Military Academy, he was promoted to the rank of captain. He joined Al-Tholaya Institute in Taiz and got a certificate of Battalions Leadership in 1969. He got his Ph.D. from Nasser Military Academy–Cairo in 1974. He continued to get promotions until he became a major general in 2007. A presidential decree issued by Abdrabbuh Mansur Hadi promoted him to Lieutenant Colonel and he was subsequently appointed as the Deputy Supreme Commander of the Yemen Armed Forces on February 22, 2016. On April 7, 2022, a presidential decree ordered that, effective immediately, Vice President Ali Mohsen al-Ahmar would be relieved of his post.

== Career ==
=== Political and military career ===
Ali Mohsen al-Ahmar started his military career in Al-Maghawir Brigade, as a leader of an infantry company in 1970, then he joined the 1st Armored Brigade and became a commander of a tank company in 1975, he became a commander of the independent 4th Tank battalion in 1977.

He was close to Ali Abdullah Saleh since 1973, and when Saleh seized power in 1978, Mohsen was promoted to full colonel in 1979 and given command of one of the Armoured Brigade. In 1983 he became Chief of Staff of the 1st Armoured Division, as well as the command of the 1st Brigade of the 1st Armored Division. He became a commander of North-Western Military District on 8 January 1995. On 22 January 2001, he was appointed as a commander of 1st Armoured Division and North-Western Military District. He became the President's Advisor for Defence and Security Affairs on 10 April 2013.

In 2004 President Ali Abdullah Saleh assigned him to lead the military operations against the Houthis. He served as a chief of the Local Council for Cooperative Development of Sanhan District – Sana'a Governorate in 1975, for three sessions—each one for a period of three years. In 1980 he was a member of the committee of National Dialogue that drafted the National Covenant which was considered the universal document for all political components that were subject to General People's Congress party.

In 1980 Mohsen participated in establishing the General People's Congress party, chaired by President Ali Abdullah Saleh, and he was a member of the Standing Committee of GPC for three consecutive sessions from 1980 to 1989. Afterwards he became a member of the Defense Committee of GPC party.

Mohsen was a primary and effective member of the preparing committee for the Yemeni unification during the negotiation process, and he participated in the integration and restructuring of the Armed Forces of Yemen after unification. He was assigned as a Deputy Chief of joint Yemeni-Saudi Military Committee for addressing the security and military balance between the two countries, and resolving the border issues.

Mohsen is known to have Salafi leanings and to support a more Islamic political agenda than Ali Abdullah Saleh. He has powerful supporters in Saudi Arabia and has aided the Saudis in establishing Wahhabi/Salafi institutions in the Zaydi heartland of Sa'dah creating internal tension.

=== Vice presidency ===
On April 3, 2016, President Abdrabbuh Mansur Hadi appointed Mohsen to the position of Vice President of Yemen. Mohsen has been serving the nation of Yemen in that capacity ever since. After he was appointed Vice President, he played an important role in activating the fighting fronts against the Houthis and Saleh, as well as supervising many battles including Marib, Midi, Taiz and Shabwah.

In October 2017, Mohsen as Vice President of Yemen headed a meeting for the Security Taskforce, an offshoot of the Friends of Yemen Group that formed to lead the fight against terrorism in Yemen. The agenda of the meeting focused on the latest developments in the country and the progress of the task force's work. Since then, Ali Mohsen become the head of counter-terrorism group in Yemen that include the United States of America, Saudi Arabia, and the United Arab Emirates. Mohsen shared with the group efforts in transferring expertise in security, military and intelligence fields to the ground and coordination for building military units to fight terrorism and clamp down on smugglers.

=== Business ventures ===
According to ambassador Thomas C. Krajeski, Mohsen was a major beneficiary of diesel smuggling and amassed a fortune in the smuggling of arms, food staples, and consumer products. Together with Sheikh Abdullah al Ahmar's sons and Ali Abdullah Saleh, were making millions working the diesel smuggling and black market, using military vehicles and National Security Bureau and Central Security Organization staff to move the fuel to markets in Yemen and Saudi Arabia. This accusations are absolutely denied by Mohsen: the favoritism and the smugglings operations was a common defect in the army units and the decision to fight that was under the authority of President Saleh", Mohsen pointed out.

== 2011 Revolution ==
The massacre of (Friday of Dignity) occurred in the Square of Change in Sana'a which was the Square for protests against President Ali Abdullah Saleh. After the demonstrators had finished Friday Prayer, masked gunmen began shooting at them for more than three hours. They killed about 45 demonstrators and wounded about 200. According to Human Rights Watch the number of dead may have reached 54 following injuries on those affected. Furthermore, about 40 of the injured persons were shot on the head, chest and other parts of upper body by semi-automatic weapons which were described by medical officials, lawyers and protesters as the work of skilled snipers.

Relations between Saleh and Mohsen had reportedly soured years before the uprising due to his rivalries with two of the president's sons. This souring of relations led to an apparent attempt by President Saleh to kill Mohsen by asking Saudi Arabian military commanders to bomb an alleged rebel base which was in fact Mohsen's headquarters. On March 21, 2011, Mohsen said he would protect the anti-government Yemeni protesters, along with other top Yemeni army commanders, in a move that was later condemned as 'mutinous' by President Saleh. On December 19, 2012, Mohsen was effectively dismissed from his position by President Hadi as part of Hadi's efforts to restructure the military and remove the political and military elite remnant from former President Ali Abdullah Saleh's rule. The forces previously under Mohsen's command, most notably the First Armoured Division, were absorbed into the Defence Ministry.

== 2014 Houthi takeover of Sana'a ==
On September 16, armed clashes broke out in northwest Sana'a between the Houthi militia and some army units led by Moshen. After four days of fighting, al-Ahmar moved toward the headquarters of Military Region VI (the previous First Armored Division, which Ahmar used to lead before he was dismissed and appointed adviser to the president for defense and security affairs in 2012). He did not comply with the president's and defense minister's directives and he led the battles against the Houthis himself, in what was seen as a possible coup attempt. Mohsen did not achieve any victories, and in two days the Houthis were in control of most major government buildings in Sana'a, including the buildings of state television, state radio, the prime minister's office, the armed forces general command, the Ministry of Defense, the Central Bank of Yemen and Military Region VI.

=== Rumored exile ===
Following the Houthi takeover of the Yemeni capital Sana'a, it was rumored that Sadiq al-Ahmar, members of the al-Ahmar family and Hashid tribal elders had fled Yemen to Saudi Arabia or Qatar. But Sadiq appeared in a videotape later in Sana'a and was still there. Mohsen was also believed to have sought refuge in either Saudi Arabia or Qatar. However, he noticed that the Saudi Embassy in Sana'a prepared a helicopter and coordinated his departure to the Kingdom of Saudi Arabia following the Houthi ascension to power. His absence has seen his homes in the Hadda neighborhood of Sana'a seized by Houthi fighters.

== 2015 Yemeni Civil War ==
After he left Yemen as a result of the Houthi takeover, Mohsen returned to Yemen to lead the military operation in Yemen's northern Hajjah Governorate in December 2015 and relocated his headquarters to Ma'rib Governorate in 2016. Since he was appointed Vice President in 2016, he has played an important role in activating the fighting fronts against the Houthis and Saleh, as well as supervising many battles including the Ma'rib campaign, the Battle of Port Midi, the Taiz campaign, and in Shabwah Governorate.

Mohsen is in regular meetings and talks with the ambassadors of the USA, UK and the ten sponsor countries of the Gulf Initiative, followed by his successive statements supporting the peace talks held in Kuwait in April 2016.

== See also ==
- 1994 Yemeni Civil War
- 2011 Yemeni Revolution

Political offices
Preceded by Khaled Bahah	Vice President of Yemen; 2016–2022	Succeeded by Aidarus al-Zoubaidi as Deputy Chairman of the Presidential Leadership Council
