= Rashad al-Alimi =

Yemeni politician (born 1954)

His Excellency Rashad al-Alimi
- رشاد العليمي
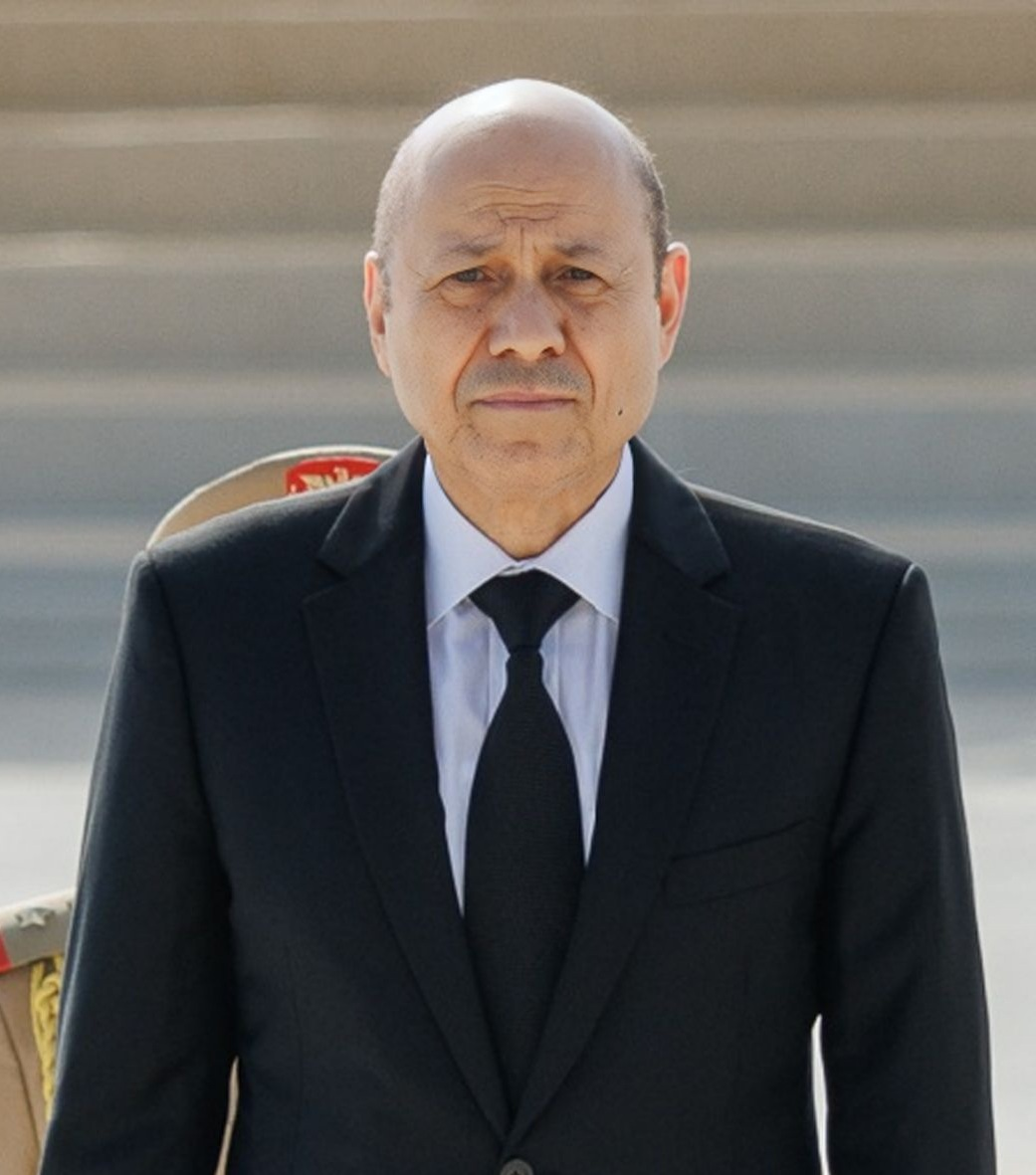
- Al-Alimi in 2022

President of the Presidential Leadership Council of Yemen
- Incumbent
- Assumed office 7 April 2022; Disputed by Mahdi al-Mashat (Supreme Political Council (Houthis))
- Prime Minister: Maeen Abdulmalik Saeed; Ahmad Awad bin Mubarak; Salem Saleh bin Braik; Shaea al-Zindani
- Vice President: Aidarus al-Zoubaidi; Tareq Saleh; Sultan Ali al-Arada; Abdullah al-Alimi Bawazeer
- Preceded by: Abdrabbuh Mansur Hadi (as President of Yemen)

Adviser to the President of Yemen
- In office 2014 – 7 April 2022
- President: Abdrabbuh Mansur Hadi

Member of the General Committee of the General People's Congress
- Incumbent
- Assumed office 2011

Deputy Prime Minister of Yemen
- In office 2006–2011
- President: Ali Abdullah Saleh
- Prime Minister: Abdul Qadir Bajamal; Ali Muhammad Mujawar

Interior Minister of Yemen
- In office 4 April 2001 – 18 May 2008
- President: Ali Abdullah Saleh
- Prime Minister: Abdul Qadir Bajamal; Ali Muhammad Mujawar
- Preceded by: Hussein Arab
- Succeeded by: Mutaher al-Masri

Personal details
- Born: 15 January 1954 (age 72) Al-Aloom, Taiz Governorate, Kingdom of Yemen
- Party: General People's Congress
- Education: Sanaa University; Ain Shams University
- Website: www.presidentalalimi.net
- Nickname: "Alimi"

Military service
- Allegiance: Yemen Arab Republic; Yemen
- Branch/service: Yemeni Armed Forces
- Years of service: 1978–present
- Battles/wars: Yemeni Civil War; 1994 civil war in Yemen

Rashad Muhammad al-Alimi (Arabic: رشاد محمد العليمي, romanized: Rashād Muḥammad al-ʻUlaymī; born 15 January 1954) is a Yemeni politician, and the president of the Presidential Leadership Council since April 2022.

== Early life and education ==
Rashad al-Alimi was born on 15 January 1954 in Al-Aloom, a village in the Taiz Governorate, and is the son of judge Mohammed ben Ali al-Alimi. He graduated from Gamal Abdel Nasser High School in Sanaa in 1969. He subsequently obtained a bachelor's degree in military science from the Kuwait Police College in 1975, and another university degree in arts from Sanaa University in 1977, then a master's degree and a doctorate in sociology from Ain Shams University in Egypt between 1984 and 1988.

== Career ==
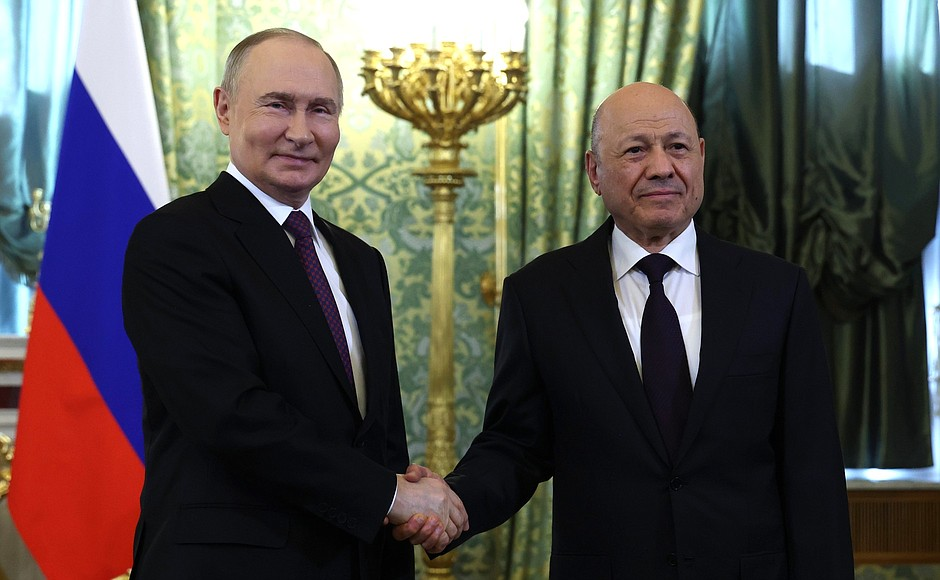
al-Alimi with Russian president Vladimir Putin on 28 May 2025

A member of the General People's Congress, he was Minister of the Interior from 2001 to 2008. He then became Chairman of the Supreme Security Committee and Deputy Prime Minister in charge of Defense and Security Affairs in May 2008, subsequently becoming a member of the Yemeni National Dialogue Conference, then adviser to President Abdrabbuh Mansur Hadi in 2014.

On 3 June 2011, during the Battle of Sanaa, al-Alimi was wounded along with Ali Abdullah Saleh during an attack on the Al-Nahdin Mosque in the Presidential Palace. He was subsequently transferred to Saudi Arabia and Germany for treatment, before returning to Sanaa on 13 June 2012. He left the city again as a result of the Houthi takeover in Yemen and began living in Saudi Arabia in 2015.

== President of Yemen ==
Al-Alimi became Chairman of the Presidential Leadership Council, a body given the powers of the President of Yemen, on 7 April 2022, through a decree by President Hadi, who irreversibly transferred his powers to the council. Multiple sources in the Yemeni and Saudi governments stated that Saudi Arabia, where Hadi was living, forced him to cede power to al-Alimi.

On 27 August 2024, al-Alimi made his first official visit to Taiz, the third largest city in Yemen, pledging to liberate the Houthi-controlled areas of the city and end the nine-year long Houthi siege affecting it. He also promised to restore or improve basic services in the city such as power supplies and announced several planned projects with funding from the Saudi Development and Reconstruction Program for Yemen such as a 30 megawatt power plant, a medical school and educational complex at Taiz University and improved roads along the Heijat Al-Abed route.

Al-Alimi and prime minister Salem Saleh bin Braik were reported to have left Aden for Riyadh, Saudi Arabia on 5 December 2025 following an offensive by the Southern Transitional Council which saw it rapidly take control of most of the former South Yemen. He chaired a meeting of Yemen's National Defence Council in Riyadh on 26 December 2025.

=== Relationship with the Houthis ===
During a briefing with journalists in Riyadh in January 2024, al-Alimi stated that the airstrike campaign launched earlier in the month by the United States and the United Kingdom against the Houthis was "defensive", saying that the solution to the Red Sea crisis "is to eliminate the Houthis’ military capabilities". Al-Alimi hailed US President Donald Trump's re-designation of the Houthis as a foreign terrorist organization on 23 January 2025, calling it "key to accountability and a step toward peace and stability in Yemen and the region."

== Notes ==
Political offices
Preceded by Hussein Arab	Interior Minister of Yemen; 2001–2008	Succeeded by Mutaher al-Masri
Preceded by Abdrabbuh Mansur Hadi as President of Yemen	— DISPUTED — Chairman of the Presidential Leadership Council of Yemen; 2022–present Disputed by Mahdi al-Mashat (Supreme Political Council); Reason for dispute: Yemeni Civil War (2014–present)	Incumbent
