= Vice President of Yemen =

Deputy Chairman of the Presidential Leadership Council of the Republic of Yemen
- Official emblem
- Incumbents; Tareq Saleh; Sultan Ali al-Arada; Abdullah al-Alimi Bawazeer; Othman Megali; Mahmoud al-Subaihi; Salem al-Khanbashi; Abdulrahman Al-Mahrami since 7 April 2022
- Presidential Leadership Council
- Style: His Excellency
- Reports to: Chairman
- Inaugural holder: Ali Salem al-Beidh
- Formation: 22 May 1990; 36 years ago
- Salary: 250,000 YER monthly

The vice president of the republic of Yemen is the second highest political position in Yemen.

As of 7 April 2022, the role is fulfilled by the Deputy Chairmen of the Presidential Leadership Council.

Under the Constitution of Yemen, the Vice President is appointed by the President, and acts as constitutional successor of the President in case of a vacancy. The Vice President assists the President in his duties. The President may delegate some of his functions to the Vice President.

The position of the Vice President of Yemen was occupied by Yemen Army general Ali Mohsen al-Ahmar from 4 April 2016, after being appointed by the President Abdrabbuh Mansur Hadi.

On April 7, 2022, in a televised address, Hadi resigned, dismissed Vice President Ahmar, and transferred the powers of the President and Vice President to the Presidential Leadership Council, with Rashad al-Alimi, former Interior Minister under President Saleh, as its chairman. The council has seven deputy chairs.

== List of vice presidents of the Yemen Arab Republic (1977–1990) ==
This office was created in 1977.

No.	Portrait	Name (Birth–Death)	Term of office			Political party
No.	Portrait	Name (Birth–Death)	Took office	Left office	Time in office	Political party
Vice President
1		Abdul Karim Abdullah al-Arashi (1934–2006)	11 October 1977	24 June 1978	256 days	Independent
First Vice President
2		Abdul Karim Abdullah al-Arashi (1934–2006)	18 July 1978	22 May 1990	11 years, 308 days	Independent (until 24 August 1982.)
2		Abdul Karim Abdullah al-Arashi (1934–2006)	18 July 1978	22 May 1990	11 years, 308 days	General People's Congress
Second Vice President
3		Abdul Aziz Abdul Ghani (1939–2011)	October 1980	December 1986	6 years, 61 days	Independent (until 24 August 1982.)
3		Abdul Aziz Abdul Ghani (1939–2011)	October 1980	December 1986	6 years, 61 days	General People's Congress

== List of vice presidents of the Republic of Yemen (1990–present) ==
No.	Portrait	Name (Birth–Death)	Term start	Term end	Political party	President (Term)
1		Ali Salem al-Beidh علي سالم البيض (1939–2026)	22 May 1990	6 May 1994	Yemeni Socialist Party	Ali Abdullah Saleh (1990–2012)
Office abolished (21 May 1994–3 October 1994)						Ali Abdullah Saleh (1990–2012)
2		Abdrabbuh Mansur Hadi عبدربه منصور هادي (1945–2026)	3 October 1994	27 February 2012	General People's Congress	Ali Abdullah Saleh (1990–2012)
Vacant (27 February 2012–13 April 2015)						Abdrabbuh Mansur Hadi (2012–2022)
3		Khaled Bahah خالد محفوظ بحاح (born 1965)	13 April 2015	3 April 2016	Independent	Abdrabbuh Mansur Hadi (2012–2022)
4		Ali Mohsen al-Ahmar علي محسن صالح الأحمر (born 1945)	4 April 2016	7 April 2022	General People's Congress	Abdrabbuh Mansur Hadi (2012–2022)
Deputy Chairman of the Presidential Leadership Council
5		Aidarus al-Zoubaidi	7 April 2022	7 January 2026	Southern Transitional Council (Dissolved)	Rashad al-Alimi (since 2022)
5		Tareq Saleh	7 April 2022	Incumbent	General People's Congress	Rashad al-Alimi (since 2022)
5		Sultan al-Arada	7 April 2022	Incumbent	Al-Islah	Rashad al-Alimi (since 2022)
5		Abdullah al-Alimi Bawazeer	7 April 2022	Incumbent	Al-Islah	Rashad al-Alimi (since 2022)
5		Abdulrahman Al-Mahrami	7 April 2022	Incumbent	Southern Transitional Council (Dissolved)	Rashad al-Alimi (since 2022)
5		Othman Megali	7 April 2022	Incumbent	General People's Congress	Rashad al-Alimi (since 2022)
5		Faraj al-Bahsani	7 April 2022	15 January 2026	Southern Transitional Council (Dissolved)	Rashad al-Alimi (since 2022)
5		Mahmoud al-Subaihi	15 January 2026	Incumbent	Independent	Rashad al-Alimi (since 2022)
5		Salem al-Khanbashi	15 January 2026	Incumbent	General People's Congress	Rashad al-Alimi (since 2022)
