= Abdullah al-Alimi Bawazir =

Yemeni politician (born 1979)

Abdullah Al-Alimi Bawazir
- Bawazeer in 2026

Deputy Chairman of the Presidential Leadership Council
- Incumbent
- Assumed office 7 April 2022
- President: Rashad al-Alimi

Director of the office of the Yemeni Presidency
- In office 8 November 2016 – 7 April 2022

Personal details
- Born: 1979 (age 46–47) Bayhan, Shabwah governorate

Abdullah Al-Alimi Bawazir (born 1979) is a Yemeni politician and member of the Yemeni Presidential Leadership Council. Abdullah was born in Bayhan, Shabwah governorate.

He served as director of the office of former president Abdrabbuh Mansur Hadi since 8 November 2016. Abdullah was considered one of President Hadi’s inner circle. He is also a member of the Al-Islah party.

== Early life and education ==
Bawazir was born in 1979 to a wealthy family in Bayhan district in Shabwah belonging to the Mashaikh Bawazir tribe which traces its roots to the Abbasid dynasty. After receiving basic education in Bahyan, he attended the University of Aden, where he received bachelor’s degree in general medicine while serving as president of the students union. He later headed to Malaysia, where he studied at the Malaysian University and completed a master’s degree in management. He returned to Yemen and attended the University of Science and Technology in Sanaa, which he graduated from with a bachelor's degree in Sharia and law.

== Career ==
The first political activities Bawazir was involved in took place during his tenure as student union president at the University of Aden. He later served on the university's teaching staff. He also eventually joined the Islah party, becoming the head of its political department in Aden Governorate.

== Careers ==
Abdullah has been a Professor at the University of Aden. In the Office of the Yemeni Presidency, he has been the Head of the Department of Local and Civil Society Organizations (2012), the Deputy Director (2015), and the Director (2016). As of 2022, he is a Member of the Yemeni Presidential Leadership Council.
