= Shura Council (Yemen) =

Upper house of Yemen's legislature

Shura Council مجلس الشورى Majlis ash-Shūrā

Type
- Type: Upper house

History
- Founded: 20 February 2001

Leadership
- Speaker: Ahmed Obaid Bin Dagher (Aden government); Muhammad Hussein al-Aidarous (Sanaa government)
- Seats: 111

Elections
- Voting system: Direct appointment by the president

The Shura Council or Consultative Council (Arabic: مجلس الشورى, romanized: Majlis ash-Shūrā) is the upper house of the parliament of Yemen, with the lower house being the House of Representatives. Unlike the House it does not take on a legislative role, instead primarily being charged with an advisory role to the president. Per the constitution it has 111 members who are appointed by the president. (Note: Currently the powers of the president are exercised by the Presidential Leadership Council in areas under their control, and by the Supreme Political Council in areas under Houthi control.) There currently exist two Shura Councils as a result of the civil war, one in Sanaa aligned with the Houthis, and one aligned with the Presidential Leadership Council in Aden.

== History ==
The Shura Council was established on 20 February 2001 by amendments to the constitution. Following the amendments, then-president Ali Abdullah Saleh appointed 111 members to the new council on 28 April 2001. As a result of the civil war, two bodies use the name of the Shura Council: One is based in Sanaa under Houthi control, with the other aligned with the Presidential Leadership Council, based in Aden. Some proposals have come forward to make changes to it: in 2015 it was proposed to expand the membership of the council, while in the same year it was also proposed during talks with the UN that the Shura Council be replaced with a transitional upper house which would consist more of underrepresented groups.

== Role ==
The constitution outlines a number of duties for the Shura Council, primarily consisting of consultative roles to the president, though also including a role in the presidential election process: presidential nominees are vetted for qualifications by, and confirmed in joint sessions of the Council and the House of Representatives. The constitution also creates a number of qualifications for candidates to the Council, and provides for the method of selection thereto:

The Consultative Council shall consist of (111) members to be directly appointed by the President of the Republic. Members of the Council shall not be drawn from the House of Representatives or from local councils. [...] Council members shall have to attain the age of forty and shall be required to take the oath of office in the presence of the President of the Republic.

The Council also meets with the House to vote on budgets and treaties, among other purposes as outlined by the President.

== Leadership ==
The leader of the council is known as the Speaker. Currently this role is fulfilled in the Aden-based council by Ahmed Obaid bin Dagher, who was appointed in 2021 along with two deputies, Abdullah Muhammad Abu Al-Ghaith and Taha Abdullah Jaafar Aman. This decision was criticized, however, by the Southern Transitional Council, as undermining the Riyadh Agreement. The speaker of the Sanaa council is Muhammad Hussein al-Aidarous.

Former speakers since establishment:

- Abdul Aziz Abdul Ghani, 2001–2011
- Abdul Rahman Mohammed Ali Othman, 2011–2015
- Abdul Rahman Mohammed Ali Othman (in Aden), 2015–2021
- Ahmed Obaid Bin Dagher (in Aden), since 2021
- Muhammad Hussein al-Aidarous (in Sanaa), since 2015

== See also ==
- Politics of Yemen
- Yemeni Crisis (2011–present)
