= Presidential Leadership Council =

Yemeni government executive body since 2022

- مجلس القيادة الرئاسي
- Central government
- Emblem of Yemen and Presidential Standard of Yemen

Overview
- Established: 7 April 2022
- State: Yemen
- Leader: President (Rashad al-Alimi); Vice-presidents (Multiple, see Members)
- Appointed by: Abdrabbuh Mansur Hadi
- Headquarters: Al-Maashiq Palace, Aden, Yemen
- Website: presidentalalimi.net

The Presidential Leadership Council (PLC; Arabic: مجلس القيادة الرئاسي, romanized: Majlis al-Qiyādah al-Riʼāsī) is the executive body of Yemen's internationally recognized government, formed on 7 April 2022. It is chaired by Rashad al-Alimi and initially had a membership of eight, including representatives from the Southern Transitional Council (STC). The decree claims all powers of the president and vice president have been transferred to this council. However, it also vests the chairman with sweeping personal powers, including the ability to unilaterally command the military and appoint governors and other key officials.

As of May 2023, three of the eight seats in the Presidential Leadership Council were held by members of the STC.

In December 2025, Saudi Arabian forces guarding the PLC's headquarters in Aden withdrew from the city amid the STC's takeover, with Saudi Arabian-aligned members of the Council—including chairman Rashad al-Alimi—leaving along with them, while the STC asserted that "The institutional makeup remains unchanged." On 22 December 2025, four non-STC members of the Presidential Leadership Council resolved to suspend any public official who supported southern secession. STC leader Aidarus al-Zoubaidi was dismissed from the council on 7 January 2026. STC vice-chairman Faraj Al-Bahsani was also dismissed from the council on 15 January 2026, with al-Alimi citing evidence that Al-Bahsani had mobilized southern troops to be deployed in Hadramaut in December 2025.

In a decree dating to 15 January 2026, al-Alimi appointed Mahmoud al-Subaihi and Salem al-Khanbashi as members of the council to fill in the vacancies of al-Zoubaidi and Al-Bahsani.

== Formation ==
On 7 April 2022, news outlets announced former Yemeni President Abdrabbuh Mansour Hadi peacefully transferred his presidential powers to an eight-member body called the Presidential Leadership Council (PLC), chaired by Rashad al-Alimi and located in Riyadh. The transfer followed negotiations conducted under Saudi and Emirati influence. Outlets including The Wall Street Journal reported that Saudi authorities pressured Hadi to resign and accept the council's formation, reportedly put him in house arrest in Riyadh until he agreed to the arrangement. However, Saudi officials maintained that the decision had been reached by consensus among Yemeni factions aligned with the internationally recognized government.

The council’s formation has been criticized as an externally political arrangement, with the Sana’a Center for Strategic Studies arguing that Yemeni political actors were largely excluded from the decisive deliberations Although the PLC claims to be national governing authority of Yemen and has received international recognition, its formation in Riyadh and reliance on Saudi political and financial backing have prompted serious questions about its autonomy as a Yemeni political power.

== Constitutional and legal situation ==
Abdrabbuh Mansour Hadi's declaration of 7 April 2022 purported to transfer his presidential powers irrevocably to the eight-member PLC, citing the Yemeni Constitution and the Gulf Cooperation Council (GCC) Initiative. However, Yemen’s Constitution does not explicitly establish such a council; Article 124 permits delegation of certain presidential functions to the vice president, while Articles 115–116 prescribe procedures for resignation and presidential succession.

Hadi’s mandate was itself contested, as the original transitional framework envisaged a two-year transition that never culminated in the planned constitutional and electoral settlement. Legal analysts have consequently questioned whether Hadi could lawfully transfer all his powers irrevocably to a body not expressly provided for by the Constitution. Moreover, Article 9 of the GCC Initiative’s executive mechanism does not explicitly authorize the creation of an eight-member presidential council. Unlike previous transitions, the PLC’s members are not elected by the Yemeni public, drawing criticism from domestic factions and legal observers and opened the PLC’s constitutional legitimacy question.

== Members ==
Incumbent	Portfolio	Notes
Rashad al-Alimi	President	A former adviser to former president Abdrabbuh Mansur Hadi.
Tareq Saleh	Vice-president	Military commander and the nephew of former president Ali Abdullah Saleh. Leader of the National Resistance.
Sultan Ali al-Arada	Vice-president	A prominent tribal and military figure. Governor of Marib Governorate. Member of the Al-Islah party.
Abdullah al-Alimi Bawazeer	Vice-president	One of president Hadi's inner circle. He also is a member of the Al-Islah party.
Abed al-Rahman Abu Zara’a	Member	Also Known as Abd al-Rahman al-Mahrami, he also leads the UAE-backed Giants Brigades. He is known to be a Salafist.
Othman Hussein Megali	Member	Lawmaker and one of the tribal leaders in Sa'dah, the main stronghold of the Houthis.
Mahmoud al-Subaihi	Member	Lieutenant General in the Yemeni Armed Forces and former Minister of Defense from 2014 to 2018.
Salem al-Khanbashi	Member	Governor of Hadhramaut Governorate

Former members

- Faraj Salmin Al-Bahsani, former governor of Hadramaut and former commander of the second military region that operates in the province. He was appointed as the vice-chairman of the Southern Transitional Council in May 2023.
- Aidarus al-Zoubaidi, chairman and commander of the Southern Transitional Council and the de facto leader of the Southern Movement.

== See also ==
- Cabinet of Yemen
- Consultation and Reconciliation Commission
