= Houthi takeover of Yemen =

2014–2015 overthrow after the capture of the capital, Sanaa

- Part of the Yemeni civil war (2014–present)
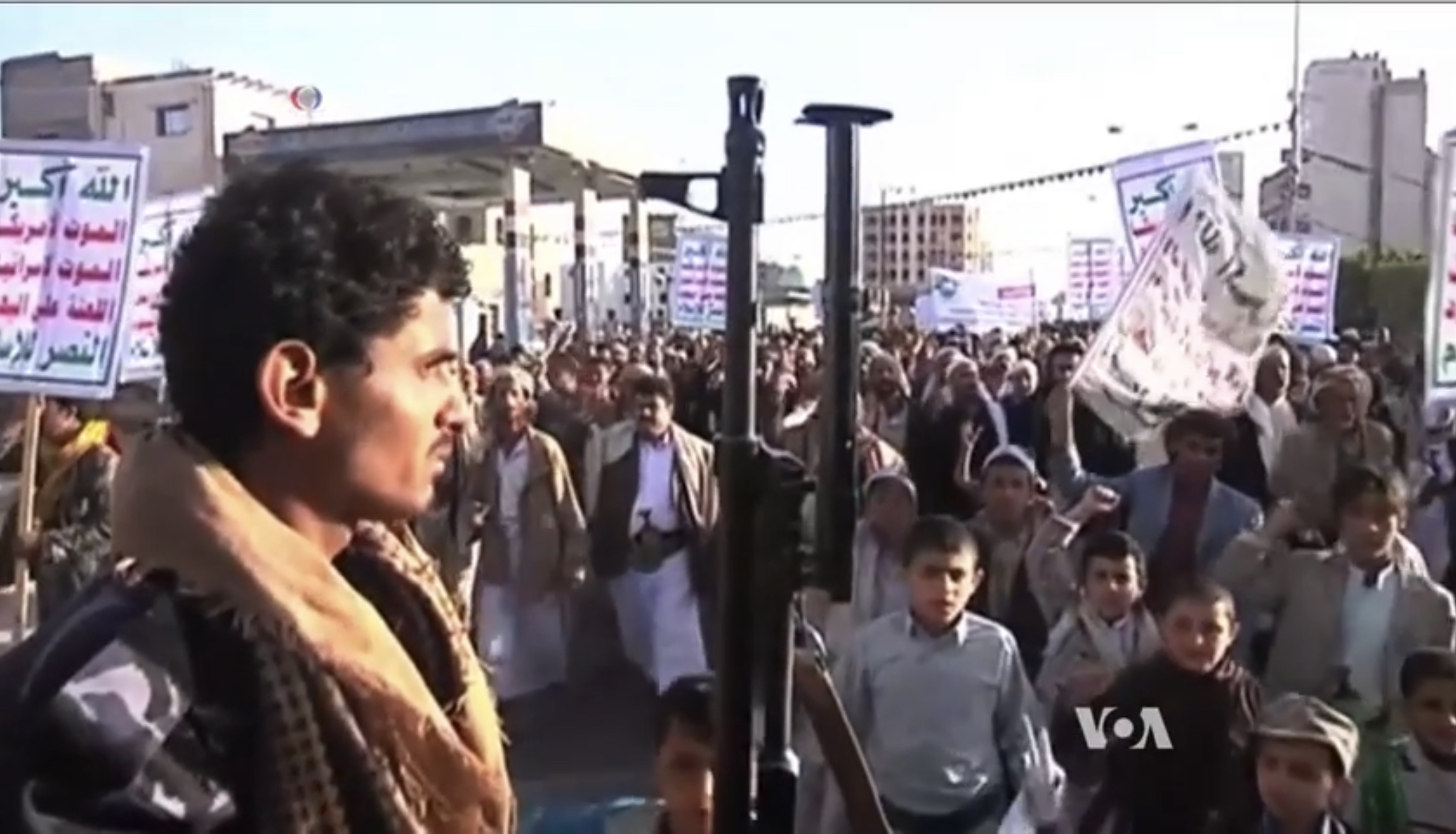
- Houthi demonstration in Sanaa
Date	21 September 2014 – 6 February 2015 (4 months, 2 weeks and 2 days)
Location	Sanaa, Yemen
Result	Houthi and Saleh loyalists victory; Houthis and Saleh's loyalists take over the Yemeni government; Fall of Sanaa to Houthis and Saleh forces; Prime Minister Mohammed Basindawa resigns; General Ali Mohsen al-Ahmar flees to Saudi Arabia; Hamid al-Ahmar flees to Turkey; Prime Minister Khaled Bahah resigns; President Abdrabbuh Mansur Hadi resigns; Houthis initially announced Parliament's dissolution; Saudi Arabian-led intervention in Yemen

Belligerents
Houthi rebels; Pro-Saleh forces; Republican Guard	Cabinet of Yemen; Loyalist forces; Al-Islah militias

Commanders and leaders
(Houthis) Abdul-Malik al-Houthi; (Houthis) Mohammed al-Houthi; (Houthis) Saleh Ali al-Sammad; (Yemen) Ali Abdullah Saleh	Abdrabbuh Mansour Hadi; (Yemen) Mohammed Basindawa; (Yemen) Ahmad Awad bin Mubarak; (Yemen) Khaled Bahah; Ali Mohsen al-Ahmar

The Houthi takeover in Yemen, also known by the Houthis as the September 21 Revolution, or 2014–15 Yemeni coup d'état (by opponents), was a popular revolution against Yemeni President Abdrabbuh Mansur Hadi led by the Houthis and their supporters that pushed the Yemeni government from power. It had origins in Houthi-led protests that began the previous month, and escalated when the Houthis stormed the Yemeni capital Sanaa on 21 September 2014, causing the resignation of Prime Minister Mohammed Basindawa, and later the resignation of President Abdrabbuh Mansur Hadi and his ministers on 22 January 2015 after Houthi forces seized the presidential palace, residence, and key military installations, and the formation of a ruling council by Houthi militants on 6 February 2015.

The unrest began on 18 August 2014 as the Houthis, angered over a government-implemented removal of fuel subsidies, called for mass protests. On 21 September, as the Houthis took control of Sanaa, the Yemeni Army did not formally intervene, other than troops affiliated with General Ali Mohsen al-Ahmar and the Muslim Brotherhood-affiliated Al-Islah Party. After gaining control over key government buildings in Sana'a, the Houthis and government signed a UN-brokered deal on 21 September to form a "unity government".

In January 2015, Houthi fighters seized control of the presidential palace and Hadi's residence in an effort to gain more influence over the government and the drafting of a new constitution. On 22 January, Hadi and his government resigned en masse rather than comply with the Houthis' demands. Three weeks later, the Houthis declared parliament to be dissolved and installed a Revolutionary Committee as the interim authority, although they agreed to keep the House of Representatives in place two weeks later as part of a power-sharing agreement. The Houthi-led interim authority was rejected by other internal opposition groups and not recognized internationally.

In March 2015, the Saudi Arabian-led intervention in Yemen began with airstrikes and a naval blockade to restore Hadi's government to power. The United States and the United Kingdom both support a political solution in Yemen. A 2017 UNICEF report stated that nearly half a million underage children in Yemen were on the verge of starvation, and about seven million people were facing acute food shortages. In 2016, the UN stated that, in Yemen, almost 7.5 million children needed medical care, and 370,000 children were on the verge of starvation.

== Background ==
On July 30, 2014, the Yemeni government announced an increase in fuel prices as part of reforms to subsidy programs, which aimed at unlocking foreign funding and easing pressure on the budget. The lifting of subsidies came after pressure from the International Monetary Fund, which conditioned its continued financial assistance on these reforms. The government raised the price of gasoline to 200 Yemeni rials per liter (93 US cents) from 125 rials (58 US cents). The price of diesel for public transport and trucks rose to 195 rials per liter (91 US cents) from 100 rials (46 US cents).

Yemen had among the highest level of energy subsidies in the region. Given its low per capita income and fiscal deficit, the country could not afford to subsidize energy especially since the elite derived the most benefit from subsidized prices. Fuel subsidies were benefiting powerful political allies of Ali Abdullah Saleh, who were smuggling subsidized oil to neighboring markets where they would reap huge profits. In 2013, fuel subsidies cost the Yemeni government $3 billion, roughly 20 percent of state expenditure, according to a Finance Ministry statement carried by Yemen's official news agency.

All the same, fuel subsidies were among the few widely available social goods in Yemen. They kept down the cost of transport, water, and food, while supporting local industry. The cash-strapped Yemeni government had been negotiating with the International Monetary Fund for more than a year to secure a loan. The loan program would require the removal of these subsidies, but the IMF recommended gradual price adjustments and an information and communication campaign to prepare the public. Neither of these were done. The IMF and other international donors also emphasized the need to expand the social safety net and cash transfer payments to those who would be most affected by the price increases. The United States and other donors had even increased their contributions to the Social Welfare Fund in the summer of 2014 in anticipation of subsidy removal. The Yemeni government ignored the advice.

The transitional government, brokered by the Gulf Cooperation Council, established in November 2011, was split equally between Saleh's General People's Congress Party and the conservative Sunni Al-Islah Party, Yemen's main Islamist party that was a key presence in the regime that protesters tried to overthrow in 2011. The new government left out the Houthis.

Instead of reshaping the political order to bring in new political voices, address corruption, and introduce responsive and accountable governance, partisan interests largely paralyzed the transitional government led by Mohammed Basindawa, perpetuating the elite dominated politics of Sana'a and its tribal allies. The Yemeni government lacked any coordinated economic planning, with key ministers from competing political parties having no incentive to work toward a unifying vision for the country.

The decision to lift fuel subsidies gave the Houthi movement the populist issue they needed to enter Sana'a and seize power. They managed to capitalize on palpable frustration among diverse segments of the population and fears of an al-Islah dominated government.

== Events ==
Map of Houthi offensives in 2014

=== 2014: Fall of Sana'a ===
==== Houthis take the capital ====
On 18 September, Houthi rebels clashed with Al-Islah militiamen in Sanaa, and by 21 September, they advanced deep into the city, capturing the government headquarters.

On 21 September, as the Houthis took control of Sana'a, the Yemeni Army did not formally intervene as the moral guidance division of the armed forces declared its "support for the people's revolution". The troops that did fight the Houthis in an unsuccessful attempt to stop their advance were affiliated with General Ali Mohsen al-Ahmar and the conservative Sunni Al-Islah Party. The Houthis portrayed their movement as a revolution against corruption and embezzlement which was draining state coffers.

Prime Minister Mohammed Basindawa resigned accusing segments of the military and government of supporting the revolt and condemned Hadi. After gaining control over key government buildings in Sana'a, the Houthis and government signed a UN-brokered deal on 21 September to form a "unity government". The Houthis, along with several other Yemeni political groups, signed a deal entitled the Peace and Partnership Agreement which provided for the formation of a new unity government.

By 22 September, at least 340 people had been killed in fighting in Sana'a. Fighting continued even after the signing of the power-sharing agreement.

==== Government under pressure ====
Ahmad Awad bin Mubarak, the chief of staff to President Abdrabbuh Mansur Hadi, was initially named as Basindawa's successor on 7 October, but he declined the post under pressure from the Houthis. The fighting left dead another 123 fighters on both sides.

On 9 October, a suicide bomb tore through Tahrir Square just before a major rally was scheduled to start. The attack killed 47 people and wounded 75, mostly supporters of the Houthis. Government officials believe the attack was perpetrated by al-Qaeda in the Arabian Peninsula, a rival of both the Yemeni government and the Houthis.

Khaled Bahah was named prime minister by Hadi on 13 October with the agreement of the Houthis.

On 7 November, the United Nations Security Council placed sanctions on former president Ali Abdullah Saleh and two Houthi commanders, Abdullah Yahya al Hakim and Abd al-Khaliq al-Huthi, for obstructing the Yemeni political process. Saleh's political party, the General People's Congress, stripped Hadi of his party positions in response, accusing him of instigating the sanctions.

The new government called for by the Peace and Partnership Agreement was sworn in on 9 November. However, the Houthis and the General People's Congress refused to participate in the new government.

The Houthis continued to flex their muscle in December, blocking General Hussein Khairan from entering his office after Hadi appointed him army chief over their objections and accusing the president of "corruption". They also reportedly abducted activist Shadi Khasrouf in Sana'a, amid demonstrations in the city demanding their withdrawal. Bahah warned he and his government could resign over Houthi interference with state institutions, which also included the eviction of top state oil company officials from their offices, the prevention of Al Hudaydah's port director from entering his office, and the firing of four provincial governors.

=== 2015: Hadi resigns ===
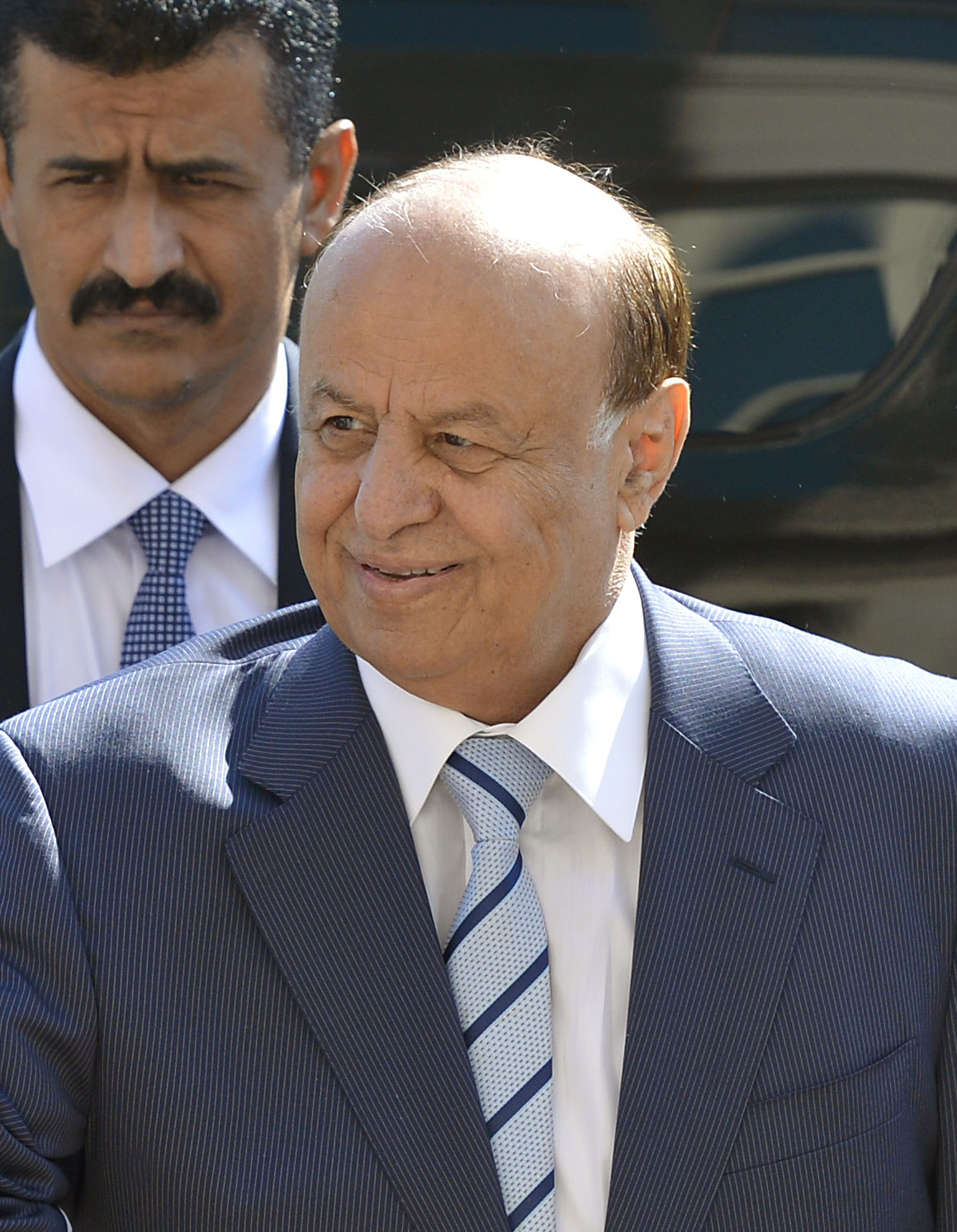
President Abdrabbuh Mansur Hadi, who resigned on 22 January 2015 in Sana'a. A month later, he escaped to his hometown of Aden, rescinded his resignation, and denounced the Houthi takeover.

==== Government forced from power ====
On 18 January 2015, the Houthis kidnapped Ahmad Awad bin Mubarak, the president's chief of staff, in a dispute over changes proposed in a new constitution. The group rejected the proposed draft of the constitution, which internally organized Yemen into six federal regions, while imposing presidential term limits, creating a bicameral legislature, and banning political parties based on religious or ethnic affiliation. Instead, they expressed a desire for Yemen to be partitioned into two federal regions.

On 19 January, Houthi gunmen surrounded the prime minister's residence in Sana'a. Fierce clashes between the rebels and the Presidential Guard erupted earlier in the day in which at least eight people were killed before a truce was agreed. A Houthi activist, Hussain Albukhaiti, said the group had been "provoked" into Monday's fighting after two of their positions were attacked. The Houthis also seized Yemen TV and the Saba News Agency headquarters. They accused Hadi of reneging on his promises regarding the draft constitution and arming al Qaeda, while government officials described the Houthi actions as a "move toward a coup".

On 20 January, forces loyal to the Houthis attacked the president's residence and swept into the presidential palace. President Hadi was inside the residence as it came under "heavy shelling" for a half-hour, but he was unharmed and protected by guards, according to Information Minister Nadia Al-Sakkaf. Presidential guards surrendered the residence after being assured that Hadi could safely evacuate. Two guards were reportedly killed in the assault. The rebels roamed the streets of Sana'a on foot and in pickup trucks mounted with anti-aircraft guns, manned checkpoints across the city and near the prime minister's residence, and fortified their presence around other key buildings, including intelligence headquarters. The U.N. Security Council called an emergency meeting about the unfolding events. United Nations Secretary-General Ban Ki-moon expressed concern over the "deteriorating situation" in Yemen and urged all sides to cease hostilities. Abdul-Malik al-Houthi, leader of the Houthi movement, gave a lengthy speech on Yemeni television demanding that Hadi move more quickly to implement political changes demanded by the Houthis. He also threatened an armed attack on Ma'rib, a restive town in central Yemen. The next day, Houthi guards took control of Hadi's residence, although a Houthi official claimed the president was free to come and go as he wished. Yemeni military sources said the Houthis also seized the military aviation college located close to Hadi's home, and the main missile base in Sana'a, without a fight.

Local officials in the southern Yemeni port city of Aden responded to the Houthi takeover of the presidential palace and residence by closing its airport, seaport, and land crossings. The city's local security committee called the Houthis' moves an "aggressive coup against the president personally and the political process as a whole".

On 21 January, a ceasefire between the Houthis and the government forces was agreed after fighting around the presidential palace, which left nine dead and 67 injured and prompted Prime Minister Khaled Bahah to go into hiding after he was allegedly shot at while exiting a meeting with Hadi and the Houthis. The ceasefire met a series of rebel demands, including the expansion of Houthi representation in parliament and state institutions. In return, the rebels said they would pull back from their positions and free the president's chief of staff. However, the ceasefire was short-lived.

On 22 January, Hadi and Bahah tendered their resignations, saying circumstances in Yemen had been altered by the Houthi advance into the capital in September 2014; Bahah declared he resigned to "avoid being dragged into an abyss of unconstructive policies based on no law". While senior Houthi officials reportedly welcomed Hadi's resignation, a statement from the Houthi leadership said the country's parliament would have to approve it in order for it to become effective.

The banner of the Houthis, with the slogan (in Arabic) "God is Great, Death to America, Death to Israel, Curse on the Jews, Victory to Islam". Commenting on the meaning of the slogan, Ali al Bukhayti, the former spokesperson and official media face of the Houthis said: "We do not really want death to anyone. The slogan is simply against the interference of those governments."

==== Power vacuum ====
In the wake of the resignations, security officials in Aden and other southern cities reportedly declared they would no longer accept orders from Sana'a, with some reports indicating they would seek an independent south.

Thousands demonstrated in Aden, Al Hudaydah, Ibb and Taiz, among other cities, against the Houthi coup on 23 January, with protesters in Aden hoisting the flag of South Yemen over Aden International Airport and several government buildings. A prominent Houthi figure resigned from the movement, saying on Facebook he would prefer to serve as a mediator now that the Houthis had become "the official authority" in Yemen. But tens of thousands demonstrated in Sana'a in support of the Houthis, converging on the airport road. They raised green flags and banners proclaiming their slogan — "Death to America, death to Israel, a curse on the Jews and victory to Islam".

Reuters reported on 25 January that several leaders of the Southern Movement had announced the south's secession, although none spoke for the entire region. Also, a special parliamentary session scheduled for lawmakers to consider whether to accept or reject Hadi's resignation was cancelled. Houthi militiamen also reportedly broke up a protest near Sana'a University, beating and detaining several journalists in the process.

Bin Mubarak was reportedly released by the Houthis on 27 January. He was handed over to local tribes in the Shabwa Governorate, according to a representative of the group. Later the same day, Houthi leader Abdul Malik Al Houthi invited tribal leaders and political factions to join a meeting in Sana'a on 30 January to resolve the crisis. Most factions boycotted the meeting, with only Ali Abdullah Saleh's GPC joining the discussions. Al Houthi reportedly proposed a six-member "transitional presidential council" with equal representation from the north and the south, but Al Jazeera said the Southern Movement refused to participate in the talks and hundreds protested in Aden against the proposal. The Southern Movement also announced it would pull out of United Nations–mediated talks on a power-sharing deal, calling them "pointless".

Toward the end of January, several U.S.-based media outlets reported that the U.S. government had begun reaching out to the Houthis in an effort to establish a working relationship with the group, despite its official anti-American position.

On 1 February, the last day of the "national conference" convened in Sana'a by the Houthis, the group issued an ultimatum to Yemen's political factions warning that if they did not "reach a solution to the current political crisis", then the Houthi "revolutionary leadership" would assume formal authority over the state. The Houthis also reportedly acquired 10 warplanes and ammunition, which they stored at their base in Sa'dah.

==== Houthi constitutional declaration ====
After about a week of negotiations between the Houthis and other Yemeni political factions, a Houthi representative announced on television from the Republican Palace in Sana'a that as of 6 February, the group was taking control of the country. The statement declared the House of Representatives dissolved and said a "presidential council" would be formed to lead Yemen for two years, while "revolutionary committees" would be put in charge of forming a new, 551-member parliament. Defence Minister Mahmoud al-Subaihi was placed in charge of a Supreme Security Committee, while Mohammed Ali al-Houthi became acting president as the head of the Revolutionary Committee. The UN refused to acknowledge the announcement. Mohammed al-Sabri of the opposition Joint Meeting Parties predicted the Houthi "coup" would lead to Yemen's international isolation. The Gulf Co-operation Council also condemned the coup, and the United States rejected the declaration. There were protests in Aden, Ta'izz, and other major cities, as well as the capital, on 7 February.

In an interview with The New York Times in Sana'a, senior Houthi official Saleh Ali al-Sammad rejected the characterization of his group's armed takeover as a coup. He said the Houthis were ready to work with both other political factions in Yemen and other countries, including the United States.

== Allegations of outside influence ==
=== Iran ===
In April 2015, United States National Security Council spokeswoman Bernadette Meehan remarked that "It remains our assessment that Iran does not exert command and control over the Houthis in Yemen".

On December 5, 2019, U.S. State Department Iran envoy Brian Hook said in a statement where he accused Iran of wanting to prolong the war in Yemen, that "the Houthis' de-escalation proposal, which the Saudis are responding to, shows that Iran clearly does not speak for the Houthis". A statement that contradicted US justification for arming the Saudis in Yemen.

Persian Gulf Arab states have accused Iran of backing the Houthis financially and militarily, though Iran has denied Arab claims, but officially supported the Houthis diplomatically and politically.

The Houthis are from Yemen's large Shia minority, and Sunni opponents of the militant group have long accused them of close ties to Iran, the largest Shia-led state in the Middle East and a traditional rival of Saudi Arabia, Yemen's largest neighbour and ally. The rise of Houthi power in Sana'a was interpreted by many analysts as a boon to Iranian influence in the region. Speaking to Al Arabiya after the Houthi announcement that parliament would be dissolved and a set of ruling councils formed to govern Yemen, one opposition politician compared the takeover to the Iranian Revolution and called it "an extension of the Iranian project".

Reuters quoted an unnamed "senior Iranian official" in December 2014 as saying that the Iranian Quds Force had a "few hundred" military personnel in Yemen training Houthi fighters.

White House spokesman Josh Earnest said in January 2015 it was unclear whether Iran was "exerting command and control" over the Houthis, although he described the U.S. government as "concerned" about the reported ties between them. The following month, U.S. Secretary of State John Kerry said Iran "contributed" to the Houthi takeover and the collapse of the Yemeni government.

Throughout 2021, the US, the UK, France, Israel, and Saudi Arabia have all provided proof of considerable Iranian military participation in Yemen. Iran admitted in April 2021 that one of its ships in the Red Sea had been targeted. Following allegations, it was suggested that Israel may have destroyed the MV Saviz, a suspected Islamic Revolutionary Guard Corps floating station used to collect intelligence and assist weapons trafficking into Yemen, according to Saudi sources.

=== Ali Abdullah Saleh ===
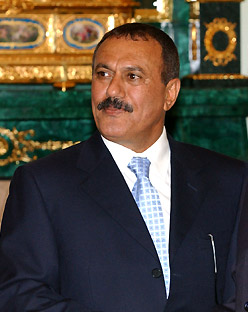
Ali Abdullah Saleh, Yemen's longtime president who was ousted after a 2011 revolution.

Yemen's former president, Ali Abdullah Saleh, retained significant influence in the country's politics since resigning. Numerous media reports have suggested a link between Saleh and the rising power of the Houthis, with Al Jazeera even claiming to have received a leaked tape of a phone conversation between Saleh and a Houthi leader coordinating tactics in October 2014, after the fall of Sana'a. The London-based online news portal Middle East Eye, citing an unnamed "source close to the president", alleged that Saleh and his son Ahmed, Yemen's ambassador to the United Arab Emirates, received as much as $1 billion from the UAE to distribute to the Houthis in their campaign against Hadi's government. A UN report in February 2015 concluded that Saleh "provided direct support" to the Houthis during their takeover of the capital, ordering his supporters not to impede their fighters and directing his son, former military commander Ahmed Ali Saleh, to assist them in some capacity.

Saleh's party, the General People's Congress, joined the Houthis in boycotting the "unity government" to which Hadi agreed under pressure after the Houthi seizure of the government headquarters. The withdrawal from the mediated political process drew swift sanctions against Saleh and Houthi leaders from both the United States and the United Nations in early November.

The GPC initially objected to the Houthis' "constitutional declaration" on 6 February 2015. However, the party announced ten days later that it withdrew its objection.

== Aftermath ==
In the wake of the Houthi takeover, several Western and Asian countries closed their embassies in Sana'a. The United Nations Security Council adopted a resolution deploring the group's seizure of power, and UN Secretary-General Ban Ki-moon and the Gulf Co-operation Council openly called for the reinstatement of Abdrabbuh Mansur Hadi as president.

UN envoy Jamal Benomar mediated talks between the Houthis and other major factions in Yemen after the "constitutional declaration". He announced a tentative agreement on 20 February 2015 that includes the continuation of the House of Representatives and the formation of a "people's transitional council" that would represent southerners, women, youth, and other minority groups. However, the next day, Hadi managed to leave his residence in Sana'a and travel to Aden, on the southern coast, where he declared he was still president under the Yemeni constitution and condemned what he called "the coup".

== See also ==
- Bab al-Mandab Strait
- Power vacuum
- Terrorism in Yemen#US air attacks
- Yemeni Revolution
- Saudi-led intervention in the Yemeni civil war
