= Abdrabbuh Mansour Hadi =

President of Yemen from 2012 to 2022

Field Marshal Abdrabbuh Mansour Hadi
- عبد ربه منصور هادي
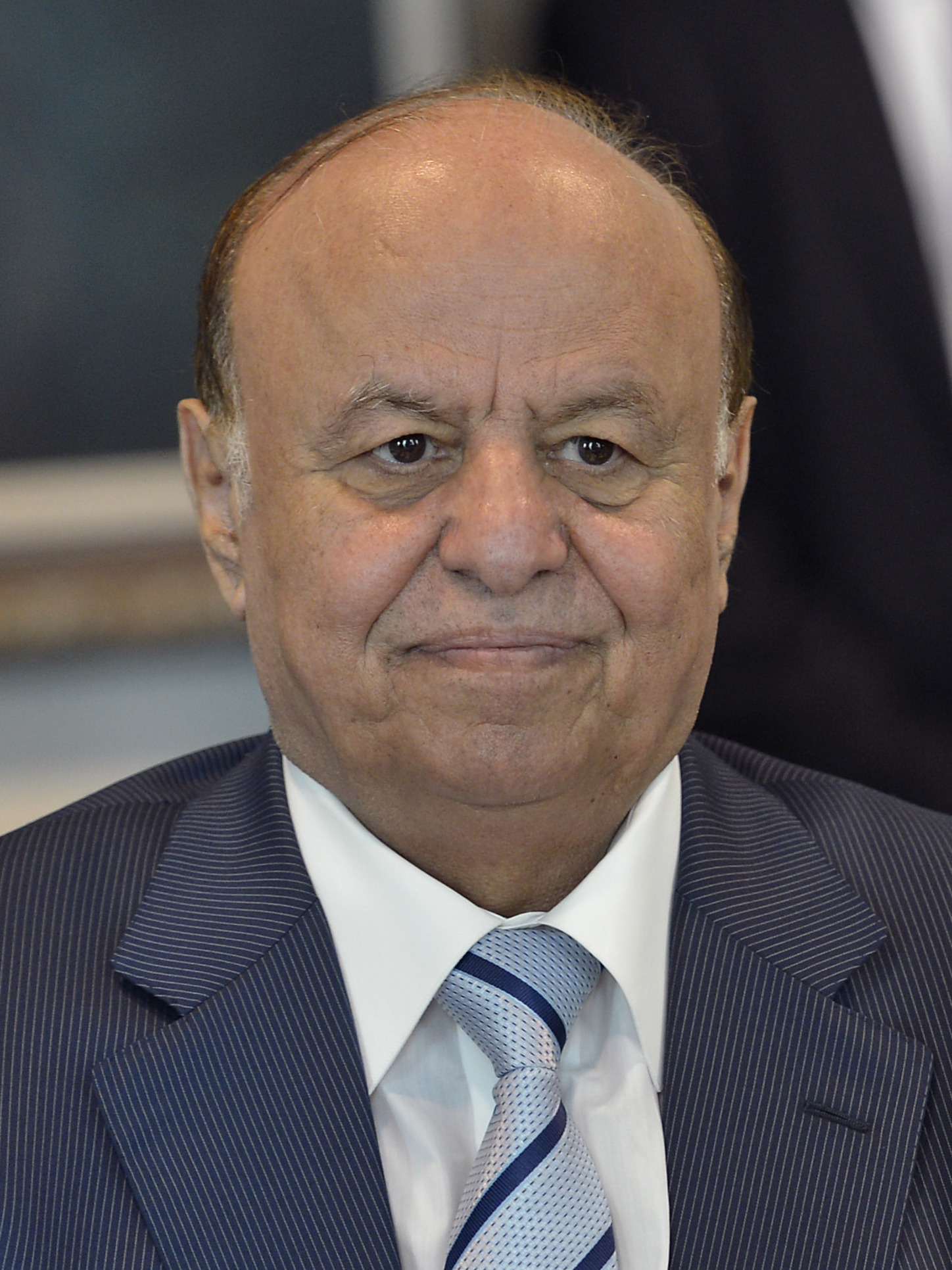
- Hadi in 2013

2nd President of Yemen
- In office 25 February 2012 – 7 April 2022 (Note: Disputed from 22 January 2015)
- Prime Minister: Ali Muhammad Mujawar; Mohammed Basindawa; Khaled Bahah; Ahmed Obaid Bin Dagher; Maeen Abdulmalik Saeed
- Vice President: Khaled Bahah; Ali Mohsen al-Ahmar
- Preceded by: Ali Abdullah Saleh
- Succeeded by: Rashad al-Alimi (as Chairman of the Presidential Leadership Council); Abdul-Malik al-Houthi (de facto leader of Houthi-controlled Yemen)

Chairman of the General People's Congress
- In office 21 October 2015 – 7 April 2022; Disputed with Ahmed Saleh and Sadeq Amin Abu Rass
- Preceded by: Ali Abdullah Saleh
- Succeeded by: Vacant

2nd Vice President of Yemen
- In office 3 October 1994 – 27 February 2012
- President: Ali Abdullah Saleh
- Prime Minister: Abdul Aziz Abdul Ghani; Faraj Said Bin Ghanem; Abd Al-Karim Al-Iryani; Abdul Qadir Bajamal; Ali Muhammad Mujawar; Mohammed Basindawa
- Preceded by: Ali Salem al-Beidh
- Succeeded by: Khaled Bahah

Defense Minister of Yemen
- In office 30 May 1994 – 3 October 1994
- President: Ali Abdullah Saleh
- Prime Minister: Muhammad Said al-Attar
- Preceded by: Haitham Qasem Taher
- Succeeded by: Abdel Malik al-Sayani

Personal details
- Born: 1 September 1945 Thukain, Al Wade'a District, Abyan Governorate, Aden Protectorate
- Died: 28 May 2026 (aged 80) Riyadh, Saudi Arabia
- Party: General People's Congress
- Relations: Nasser Mansour Hadi (brother)
- Children: 6

Military service
- Allegiance: South Arabia (1964–1967); South Yemen (1967–1986); Yemen (1990–2022)
- Branch/service: Yemeni Land Forces
- Years of service: 1964–2022
- Rank: Field marshal
- Battles/wars: Aden Emergency; Second Yemenite War; South Yemen Civil War; 1994 Yemeni Civil War; Yemeni Civil War (2014–present)

Abdrabbuh Mansour Hadi (Note: Arabic: عبد ربه منصور هادي, romanized: ʿAbd Rabbih Manṣūr Hādī, Yemeni pronunciation: [ˈʕæb.də ˈrɑb.bu mɑnˈsˤuːr ˈhæːdi]) (1 September 1945 – 28 May 2026) was a Yemeni politician and military officer who served as the second president of Yemen from 2012 until his resignation in 2022. He previously served as the second vice president of Yemen from 1994 to 2012 under President Ali Abdullah Saleh.

Hadi was previously the field marshal of the Yemeni Armed Forces. In 2011, he briefly served as acting president for Saleh, who was undergoing medical treatment in Saudi Arabia following an attack on the presidential palace during the 2011 Yemeni uprising. On 23 November, he became acting president again, after Saleh moved into a non-active role pending a presidential election "in return for immunity from prosecution". Hadi was "expected to form a national unity government and also call for early presidential elections within 90 days" while Saleh continued to serve as president in name only.

He was chosen as a president for a two-year transitional period on 21 February 2012 by Yemen's political factions, in an election where he was the sole consensus candidate, although the election was boycotted by Houthis in the north and Southern Secessionists in the south of the country. Hadi's mandate was extended for another year in January 2014. According to the pro-Houthi media outlet SABA, Hadi remained in power after the expiration of his mandate.

On 22 January 2015, he was forced to resign by the Houthis in the midst of mass protest against his decision to raise the fuel subsidies and due to dissatisfaction with the outcome of the 2011 revolution. Subsequently, the Houthis and the supporters of Saleh seized the presidential palace and placed Hadi under house arrest. The Houthis named a Revolutionary Committee to assume the powers of the presidency, as well as unify with the General People's Congress, Hadi's own political party. A month later, Hadi escaped to his hometown of Aden, rescinded his resignation, and denounced the Houthi takeover. He arrived in Riyadh the next day, as a coalition of countries led by Saudi Arabia intervened in support of his government. He returned to Aden in September 2015, as Saudi-backed government forces recaptured the city. In late 2017, he was reportedly residing in Riyadh under house arrest.

In 2022, Hadi stepped down and transferred executive authority to the Presidential Leadership Council, with Rashad al-Alimi as its chairman, which would seek a political solution to Yemen's civil war. This came amid a broader push for peace with Saudi Arabia. Multiple sources in the Saudi and Yemeni governments alleged that he had been forced to cede power by the Saudis.

== Early life and military career ==
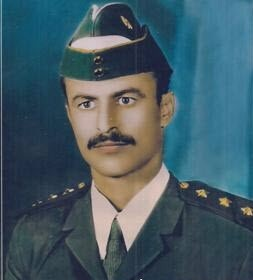
Hadi during his service as a captain in the army of South Yemen, c. 1972

Hadi was born on 1 September 1945 in Thukain, Al Wade'a District, Abyan, a southern Yemeni governorate. He graduated from a military academy in the Federation of South Arabia in 1966. He had received a military scholarship to study in Britain, but was not able to attend, as he did not speak English.

He played a low-profile role during the Aden Emergency. Following the independence of South Yemen, he rose to prominence in the new military, reaching the rank of Major General.

In 1970, he received another military scholarship to study armoured warfare in Egypt. Hadi spent the following four years in the Soviet Union studying military leadership. He occupied several military posts in the army of South Yemen until 1986, when he fled to North Yemen with Ali Nasser Mohammed, president of South Yemen, after Ali Nasser's faction of the ruling Yemeni Socialist Party lost the 1986 civil war.

Hadi remained loyal to President Ali Nasser Mohammed during the South Yemen Civil War, and followed him into exile in neighboring North Yemen. During the 1994 civil war in Yemen, Hadi sided with the Yemeni government of President Ali Abdullah Saleh and was appointed Minister of Defense. In this role he led the military campaign against the Democratic Republic of Yemen.

== President of Yemen ==
=== Mandate ===
Hadi was the sole candidate in the presidential election that was held on 21 February 2012. His candidacy was backed by the ruling party, as well as by the parliamentary opposition. The Electoral Commission reported that 65 percent of registered voters in Yemen voted during the election. Hadi won with 100% of the vote and took the oath of office in Yemen's parliament on 25 February 2012. He was formally inaugurated as the President of Yemen on 27 February 2012, when Saleh resigned from the presidency and formally ceded power to him.

=== Political reform ===
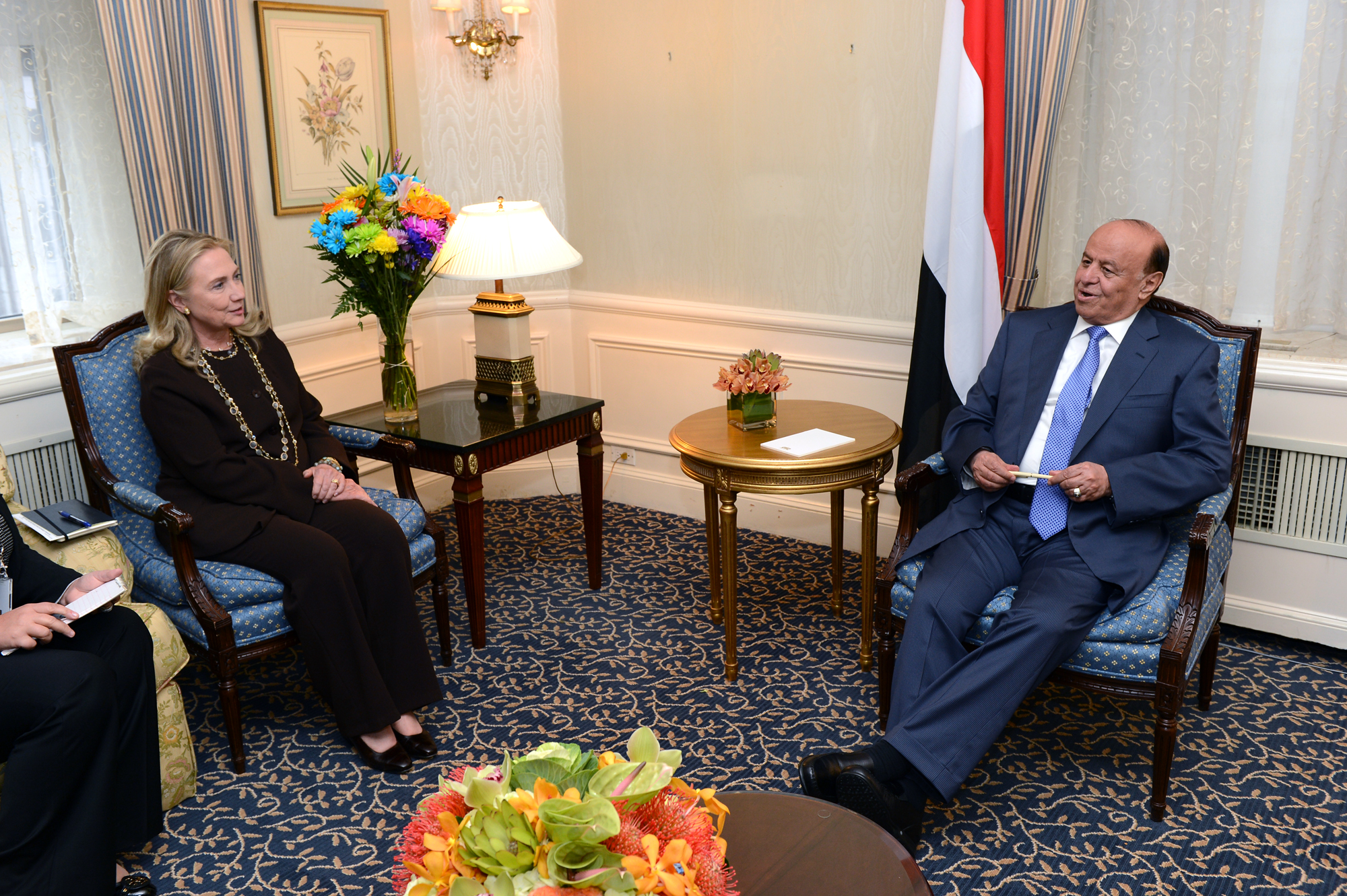
Hillary Clinton meets Hadi in New York, 2012.

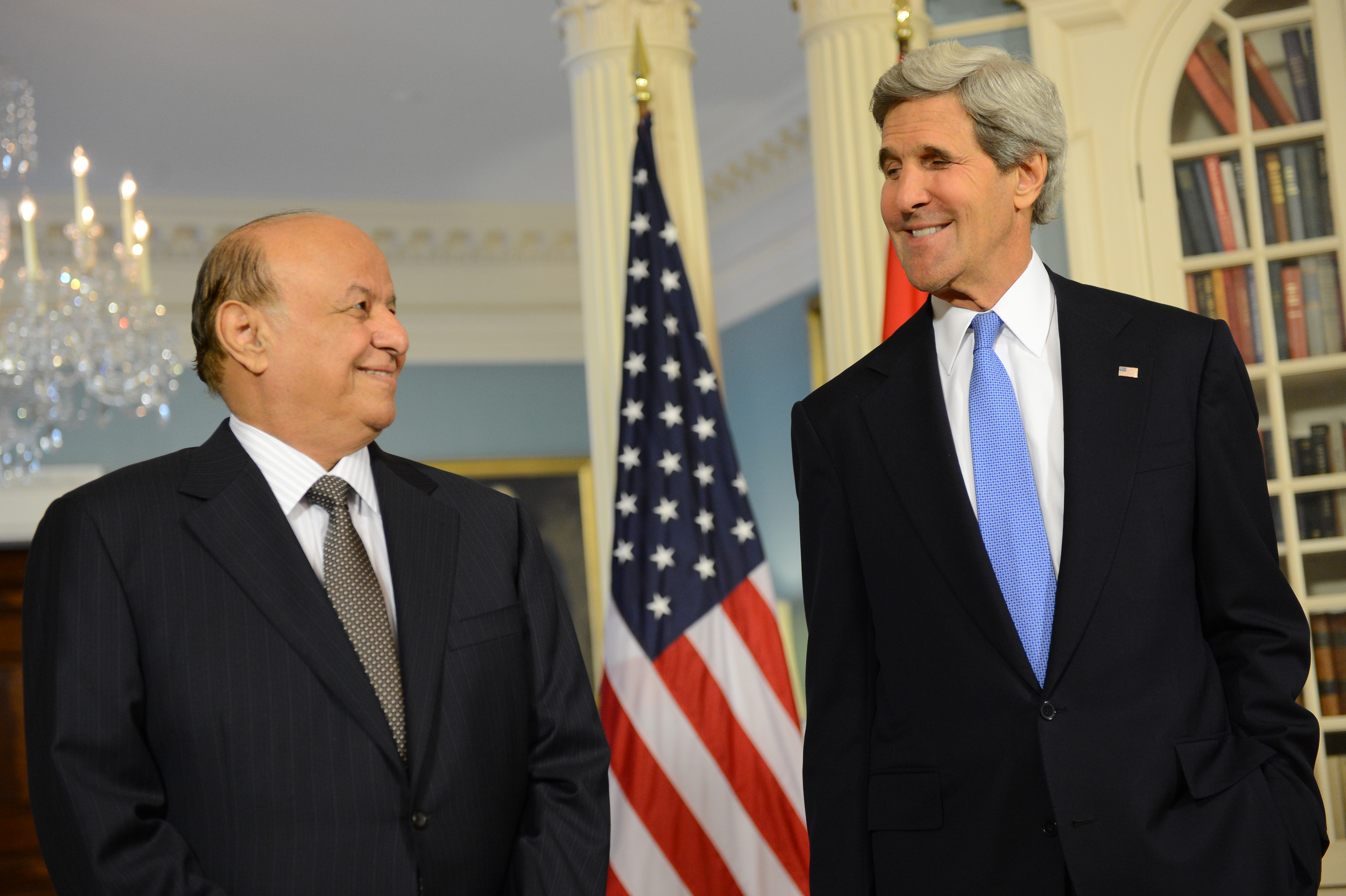
Hadi and U.S. Secretary of State John Kerry, 29 July 2013

In March 2013 the National Dialogue Conference was conceived as a core part of the transition process and is intended to bring together Yemen's diverse political and demographic groups to address critical issues. In January 2014, Hadi pushed delegates at the conference to break a deadlock on key issues and bring the talks to an overdue close. When those in attendance finally agreed on a final few points, he launched into an impassioned speech that led to a spike in his popularity. It was agreed that Yemen would shift to a federal model of government in the future, a move which was proposed and forcefully backed by Hadi. For many Yemenis, particularly in northwestern Yemen, this decentralization was less attractive. This mountainous region is the poorest of Yemen and decentralization would mean that it would receive less money from the central government. Relevant here is that the overwhelming majority of Yemen's population has resided in this area for many years. Indeed, the 'decentralization' of Yemen along the lines proposed by the Saudi-imposed Hadi regime threatened Yemen's long-term economic and political independence; scholar Isa Blumi points out that "To any rational observer, the idea of developing Yemen into six disproportionate regions with enormous autonomy was a blatant effort to benefit foreign interests and subdue the rebellious populations through poverty and administrative obscurity." If the Saudi-American decentralization 'road map to peace' had been implemented, Yemen's oil wealth would be largely confined to the two least populous provinces, Hadhramawt and Saba'. Blumi goes on to point out that "This would make bribing the few thousands of eligible 'residents' with a tiny portion of the oil revenue (no longer flowing to the central state) easy, while creating an enormous windfall for those hoping to steal Yemen's wealth."

=== Military ===
In a move to unify the Armed Forces of Yemen, which suffered from a split since the Yemeni Revolution, Hadi issued Presidential decree No. 104 in December 2012, reorganizing the military into five main branches: Air Force, Army (Ground Force), Navy and Coastal Defense, Border Troops, and Strategic Reserve Forces, which includes the Special Operation Command, the Missile Defense Command, and the Presidential Protective Forces. The Strategic Reserve Forces replaced the Republican Guard.

=== Security issues ===
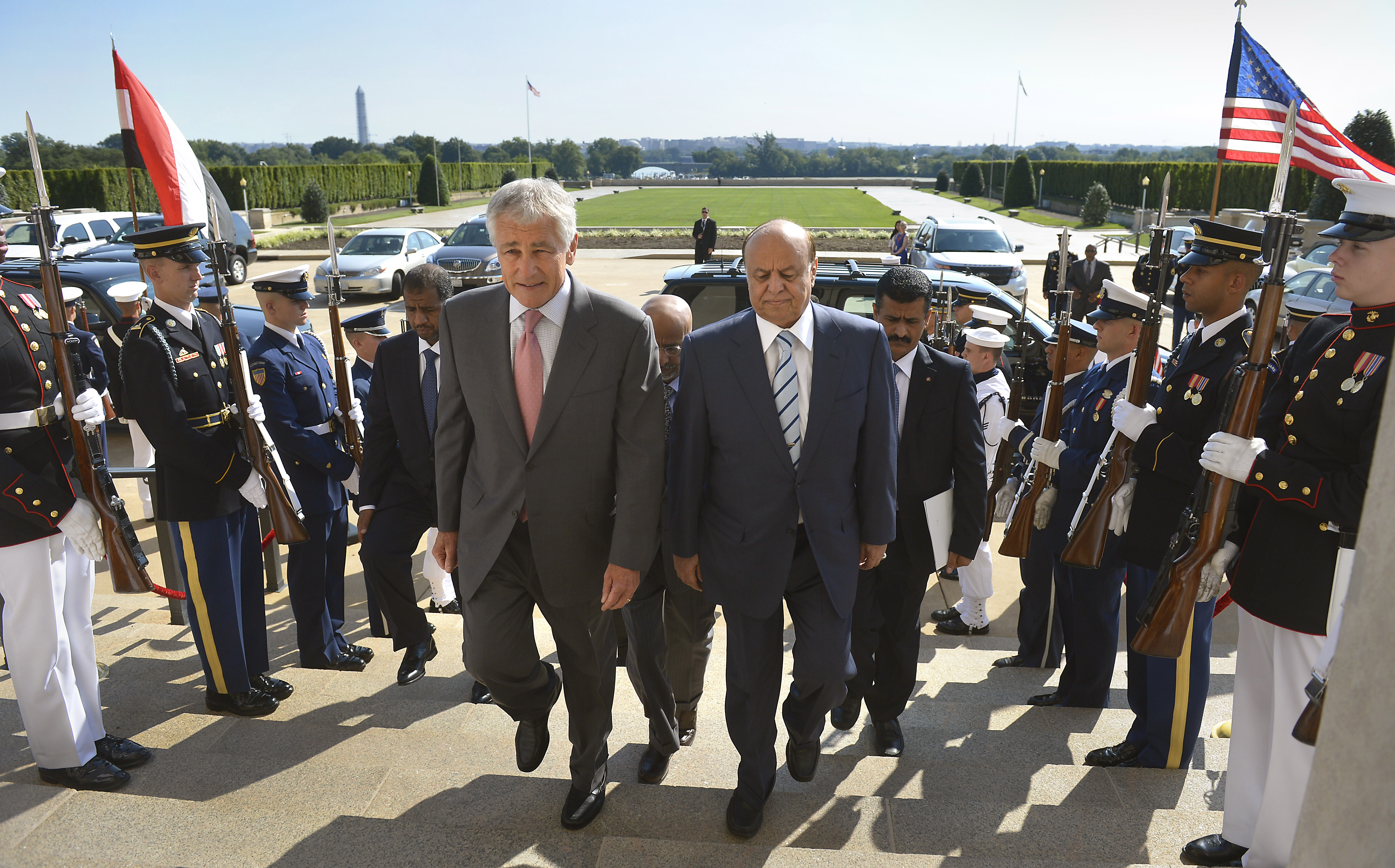
Hadi with U.S. Secretary of Defense Chuck Hagel at the Pentagon on 30 July 2013

From his early days in office, Hadi advocated fighting Al-Qaeda as an important goal. In a meeting with British Foreign Secretary, William Hague Hadi said, "We intend to confront terrorism with full force and whatever the matter we will pursue it to the very last hiding place".

The Yemeni military had suffered from sharp divisions since Major General Ali Mohsen Al-Ahmar defected in late March 2011 amid protests demanding the ouster of Hadi's predecessor, Ali Abdullah Saleh. The military protests extended to the Republican Guard based in the south of Sana'a when dozens from the Fourth Brigade closed down southern entrances to the capital city and demanded the firing of the brigade's commander, Mohammad Al-Arar, and his general staff.

In an interview in September 2012 given to The Washington Post, Hadi warned that his country, still reeling from the popular uprising that ousted Saleh, risked a descent into a civil war "worse than Afghanistan", should an upcoming months-long national dialogue fail to resolve the state's deep political and societal rifts. He also said that Yemen was facing "three undeclared wars" conducted by al Qaeda, pirates in the Gulf of Aden, and Houthi rebels in the north, and that Iran was supporting these adversaries indirectly without giving further details.

Houthis, on their side, complained of murderous attacks on their delegates to the NDC.

In response to the murder of the Saudi journalist Jamal Khashoggi after visiting a Saudi consulate in Istanbul, Hadi said that the "cheap political and media targeting of Saudi Arabia will not deter it from continuing its leading role in the Arab and Islamic worlds."

=== Houthi takeover and civil war ===
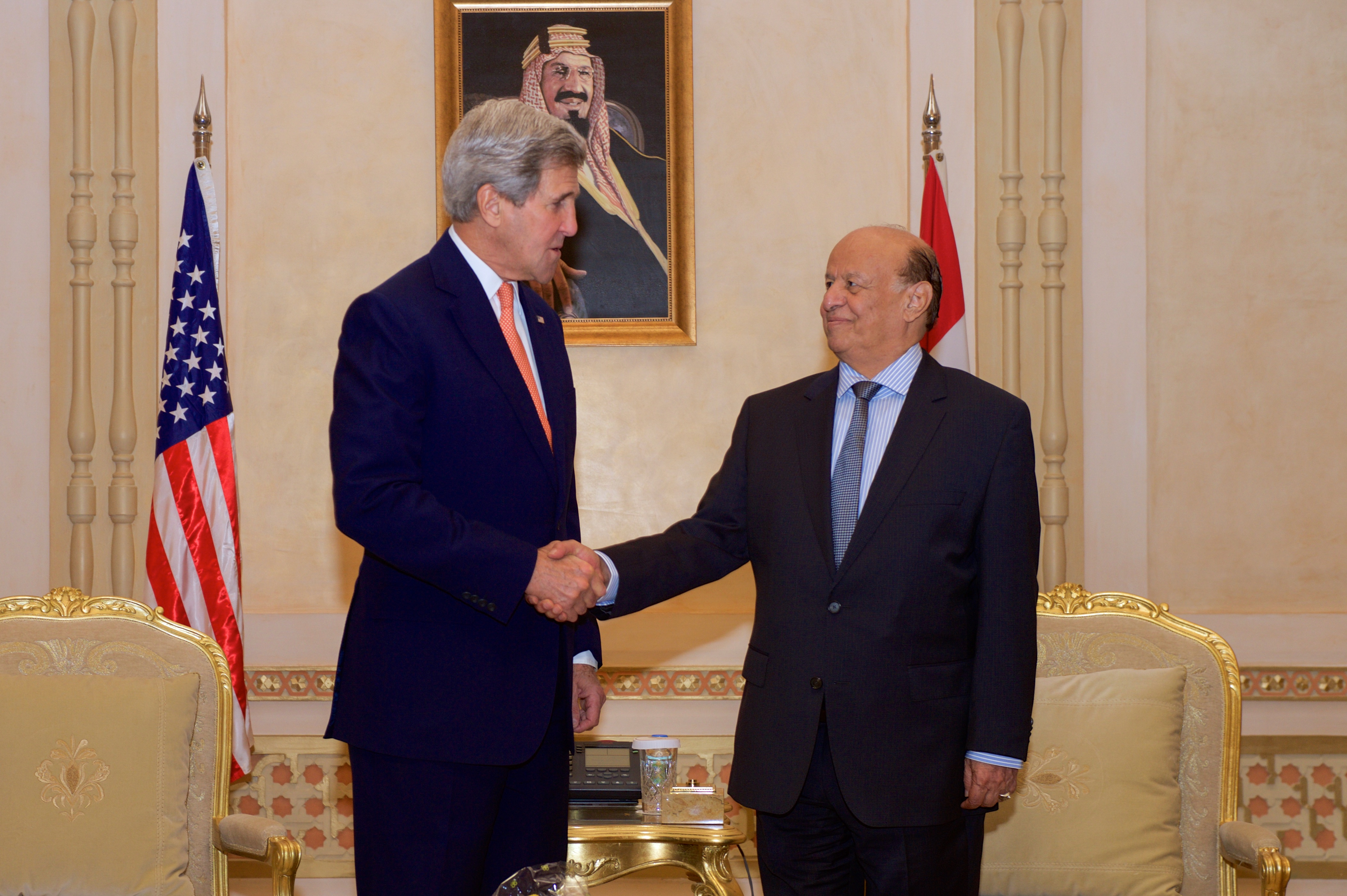
Hadi and John Kerry in Riyadh, Saudi Arabia, 7 May 2015

Hadi was forced to agree to a power-sharing deal after the fall of Sana'a to the rebel umbrella organization Ansar Allah, also known as the Houthis, in September 2014. The Houthis refused to participate in the "unity government", although they continued to occupy key positions and buildings in Sana'a and hold territory throughout northern Yemen. Hadi was further humiliated when the General People's Congress ousted him as its leader and rejected his cabinet choices on 8 November 2014. The Houthis' pretext for entering Sana'a and deposing Hadi was to reverse an apparent breach of the Hadi government's mandate by unilaterally declaring an extension of its power beyond the two-year intermediary period actually set by the GCC and the United States. They also accused the president of seeking to bypass a power-sharing deal signed when they seized Sana'a in September, and said they were working to protect state institutions from corrupt civil servants and officers trying to plunder state property.

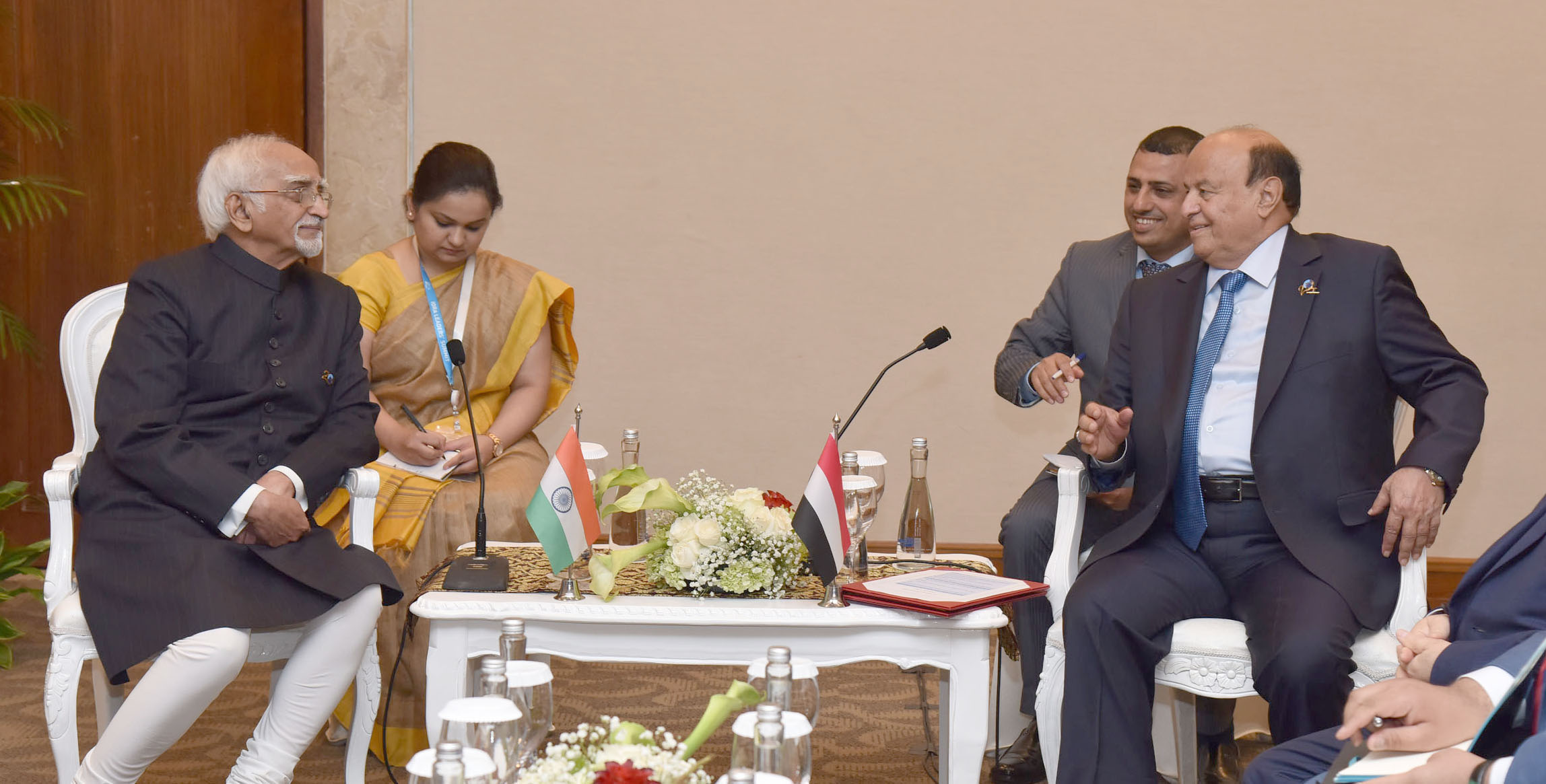
Hadi and Indian Vice-President Mohammad Hamid Ansari in Jakarta, Indonesia, in 2017

Three days after Hadi's resignation (21 January 2015), the Houthis took over the Presidential palace. Hadi and Prime Minister Khaled Bahah tendered their resignations to parliament which reportedly refused to accept them. Then the Yemeni cabinet was dissolved. Hadi and his former ministers remained under virtual house arrest after their resignations.

United Nations Secretary-General Ban Ki-moon called for Hadi's reinstatement after the Houthis installed themselves as the interim government in February 2015. According to Houthi-controlled state media, Hadi reaffirmed on 8 February that his resignation was final and could not be withdrawn.

However, after leaving Sana'a and traveling to his hometown of Aden on 21 February, Hadi declared that the actions taken by the Houthis since 21 September were unconstitutional and invalid.

On 26 March 2015, Saudi state television Al Ekhbariya reported that Hadi arrived at a Riyadh airbase and was met by Saudi Arabia Defense Minister Mohammad bin Salman Al Saud as Saudi Arabia and its allies' launched airstrikes in Yemen against the Houthis in the 2015 military intervention in Yemen. His route from Aden to Riyadh was not immediately known.

On 25 March 2017, a court in the Houthi-controlled Sana'a sentenced Hadi and six other government officials to death in absentia for "high treason", which meant "incitement and assistance" to Saudi Arabia and its allies." The sentence was announced by the Houthi-controlled Saba News Agency.

== Resignation ==
On 7 April 2022, Hadi announced in a televised speech that he was resigning from office, dismissing vice-president Ali Mohsen al-Ahmar, and transferring power to the newly formed eight members Presidential Leadership Council chaired by Rashad al-Alimi. He also said that the council was tasked with negotiating with the Houthi rebels to agree to a permanent ceasefire. Al-Alimi had close ties with Saudi Arabia, and some of Yemen's other political groups, including the Islah party.

Officials from Saudi Arabia and Yemen claimed that Hadi was pushed by Riyadh to give up his power to the presidential council. Hadi received a written decree from Saudi Crown Prince Mohammed bin Salman to transfer his authority to the council. According to Crown Prince Mohammed, the decision was approved by other Yemeni leaders. Saudi officials also threatened to disclose evidence of corruption allegedly committed by him if he refused to resign. Following his decision to step down, he was kept under house arrest in his Riyadh residence and not allowed to communicate with anyone. All of these claims were denied by Saudi Arabia.

== Personal life and death ==
Hadi was married and had six children. He died from a heart attack in Riyadh, Saudi Arabia, on 28 May 2026, at the age of 80. The Yemeni government announced three days of mourning following Hadi's death, with flags at half-staff.

== Notes ==
Political offices
Preceded by Ali Salem al-Beidh as Deputy Chairman of the Presidential Council of Yemen	Vice President of Yemen; 1994–2012; Acting President: 2011, 2011–2012	Vacant Title next held by Khaled Bahah
Preceded by Ali Abdullah Saleh	President of Yemen; 2012–2022; Disputed starting 2015; Reason for dispute: Yemeni Civil War (2014–present)	Succeeded by Rashad al-Alimi as Chairman of the Presidential Leadership Council
Party political offices
Preceded by Ali Abdullah Saleh	— DISPUTED — Chairman of the General People's Congress; 2015–2022; Disputed by Ali Abdullah Saleh, Sadeq Amin Abu Rass and Ahmed Saleh; Reason for dispute: Yemeni Civil War (2014–present)	Vacant
