= List of vice presidents in 2016 =

This is a list of vice presidents in 2016.

== Africa ==
- Angola Vice President - Manuel Vicente (2012–2017)
- Botswana Vice President - Mokgweetsi Masisi (2014–2018)
- Burundi
  - First Vice President - Gaston Sindimwo (2015–2020)
  - Second Vice President - Joseph Butore (2015–2020)
- Comoros - Vice Presidents -
  1. Mohamed Ali Soilihi (Vice President in charge of Finance, Economy, Budget, Investment, External Trade and Privatization) (2011–2016), Fouad Mohadji (Vice President in Charge of Health, Solidarity, Social Cohesion, and Gender Promotion) (2011–2016), Nourdine Bourhane (Vice President in Charge of Ministry of Regional Planning, Infrastructure, Urbanism, & Housing) (2011–2016)
  2. Djaffar Ahnwd Said Hassani (Vice President in charge of the Ministry of Economy, Planning, Industry, Crafts, Investments, Private Sector and Land Affairs) (2016–2018), - Moustadroine Abdou (Vice President in Charge of the Ministry of Agriculture, Fishing, Environment, Spatial Planning and Urbanism) (2016–2018), Abdallah Said Sarouma (Vice President in Charge of the Minister of Transport, Posts and Telecommunication and Information and Communication Technology) (2016–2018)
- Equatorial Guinea
  - 1 Vice Presidents -
    - First Vice President - Ignacio Milam Tang (2012–2016)
    - Second Vice President - Teodoro Nguema Obiang Mangue (2012–2016)
  - 2 Vice President – Teodoro Nguema Obiang Mangue (2016–present)
- The Gambia Vice President - Isatou Njie-Saidy (1997–2017)
- Ghana Vice President - Kwesi Amissah-Arthur (2012–2017)
- Ivory Coast (Côte d'Ivoire) Vice President - vacant (2016–2017)
- Kenya Deputy President - William Ruto (2013–present)
- Liberia Vice President - Joseph Boakai (2006–2018)
- Libya
  - Government of House of Representatives of Libya (Government of Libya internationally recognized to 12 March 2016) Deputy presidents of the House of Representatives of Libya - Imhemed Shaib (2014–2021). Ahmed Huma (2014–2021)
  - National Salvation Government of Libya, government of New General National Congress of Libya (Government of Libya in rebellion internationally unrecognized. disbanded 5 April 2016) Deputy presidents of the New General National Congress of Libya - Mohammad Awad Abdul-Sadiq (2015–2016), Saleh Makzoon (2016)
  - Government of National Accord of Libya (Interim government internationally recognized as the sole legitimate government of Libya from 12 March 2016) - Vice Presidents of the Presidential Council of Libya (Tripoli) - Musa Al-Koni (2016–2017), Abdulsalam Kajman (2016–2021), Ahmed Maiteeq (2016–2021), Ali Faraj Qatrani (2016–2019)
- Malawi Vice President - Saulos Chilima (2014–2019)
- Mauritius Vice President -
  1. Monique Ohsan Bellepeau (2010–2016)
  2. Barlen Vyapoory (2016–2019)
- Namibia Vice President - Nicky Iyambo (2015–2018)
- Nigeria Vice President - Yemi Osinbajo (2015–present)
- Seychelles Vice President -
  1. Danny Faure (2010–2016)
  2. vacant (2016)
  3. Vincent Meriton (2016–2020)
- Sierra Leone Vice President - Victor Bockarie Foh (2015–2018)
- Somaliland Vice President - Abdirahman Saylici (2010–present)
- South Africa Deputy President - Cyril Ramaphosa (2014–2018)
- South Sudan
  - 1 Vice President - James Wani Igga (2013–2016)
  - 2 Vice Presidents
    - First Vice President -
      1. Riek Machar (2016)
      2. Taban Deng Gai (2016–2020)
    - Vice President - James Wani Igga (2016–2020)
- Sudan
  - First Vice President - Bakri Hassan Saleh (2013–2019)
  - Second Vice President - Hassabu Mohamed Abdalrahman (2013–2018)
- Tanzania Vice President - Samia Suluhu (2015–2021)
  - Zanzibar
    - First Vice President - Seif Sharif Hamad (2010–2019)
    - Second Vice President - Seif Ali Iddi (2010–2020)
- Uganda Vice President - Edward Ssekandi (2011–2021)
- Zambia Vice President - Inonge Wina (2015–2021)
- Zimbabwe
  - First Vice Presidents - Emmerson Mnangagwa (2014–2017)
  - Second Vice President - Phelekezela Mphoko (2014–2017)

== Asia ==
- Abkhazia Vice President - Vitali Gabnia (2014–2018)
- Afghanistan
  - First Vice President - Abdul Rashid Dostum (2014–2020)
  - Second Vice President - Sarwar Danish (2014–2021)
- China (People's Republic of China) Vice President - Li Yuanchao (2013–2018)
- India Vice President - Mohammad Hamid Ansari (2007–2017)
- Indonesia Vice President - Jusuf Kalla (2014–2019)
- Iran
  - First Vice President - Eshaq Jahangiri (2013–2021)
  - Others Vice Presidents -
  1. Mohammad Shariatmadari (Vice President for Executive Affairs) (2013–2017), Elham Aminzadeh (Vice President for Legal Affairs) (2013–2016), Majid Ansari (Vice President for Parliamentary Affairs) (2013–2016). Sorena Sattari (Vice President for Science and Technology) (2013–2022), Shahindokht Molaverdi (Vice President for Women's and Family Affairs) (2014–2017). Ali Akbar Salehi (Vice President and Head, Atomic Energy Organization) (2013–2021). Masoud Soltanifar (Vice President and Head, Cultural Heritage, Handicrafts, and Tourism Organization) (2013–2016), Masumeh Ebtekar (Vice President and Head, Environmental Protection Organization) (2013–2017), Mohammad-Ali Shahidi (Vice President and Head of Martyrs and War Veterans Affairs Foundation) (2013–2016), Akbar Torkan (Vice President for International Affairs) (2013–2016)
  2. Mohammad Shariatmadari (Vice President for Executive Affairs) (2013–2017). Mohammad Bagher Nobakht (Vice President and Head of Management and Planning Organization) (2016–2021), Majid Ansari (Vice President for Legal Affairs) (2016–2017), Hossein-Ali Amiri (Vice President for Legal and Parliamentary Affairs) (2016–2017), Sorena Sattari (Vice President for Science and Technology Affaires) (2013–2022). Shahindokht Molaverdi (Vice President for Women's and Family Affairs) (2014–2017). Masoud Soltanifar (Vice President of Cultural Heritage and Tourism Organization) (2013–2016), Zahra Ahmadipour (Vice President of Cultural Heritage and Tourism Organization) (2013–2016) Ali Akbar Salehi (Vice President and Head of Atomic Energy Organization) (2013–2021), Mohammad-Ali Shahidi (Vice President and Head of Martyrs and Self-sacrifice's Affairs Foundation) (2016–2020). Jamshid Ansari (Vice President and Head of Administrative and Recruitment Organization) (2016–2021). Masumeh Ebtekar (Vice President and Head of Environmental Protection Organization) (2013–2017)
- Iraq Vice Presidents -
  1. abolished (2015–2016)
  2. Nouri al-Maliki (2016–2018), Usama al-Nujayfi (2016–2018), Ayad Allawi (2016–2018)
  - Kurdistan Vice President- Kosrat Rasul Ali (2005–2017)
- Israel Speaker of the Knesset (Vice President ex officio) - Yuli-Yoel Edelstein (2013–2020)
- North Korea (Democratic People's Republic of Korea) –
  - Vice presidents de facto -
    1. Vice Chairmen of National Defence Commission - Hwang Pyong-so (2014–2016), O Kuk-ryol (1998–2016). Ri Yong-mu (2009–2016)
    2. Vice Chairmen of State Affairs Commission - Hwang Pyong-so (2016–2018). Choe Ryong-hae (2016–present). Pak Pong-ju (2016–2021)
  - Vice presidents de jure - Vice Chairmen of the Presidium of Supreme People's Assembly - Kim Yong-dae (1998–2019). Yang Hyong-sop (1998–2019), Choe Yong-rim (honorary) (2011–2019), Kim Yong-ju (honorary) (1998–2019)
- Laos Vice President –
  1. Bounnhang Vorachith (2006–2016)
  2. Phankham Viphavanh (2016–2021)
- Maldives Vice President – Abdulla Jihad (2016–2018)
- Myanmar
  - First# Vice President –
    1. Sai Mauk Kham (2011–2016)
    2. Myint Swe (2016–2021)
  - Second Vice President –
    1. Nyan Tun (2012–2011)
    2. Henry Van Thio (2016–2021)
- Nepal Vice President - Nanda Bahadur Pun (2015–present)
- Philippines Vice President –
  1. Jejomar Binay (2010–2016)
  2. Leni Robredo (2016–present)
- Syria
  - Syrian Arab Republic Vice President – Najah al-Attar ((2006–present))
  - Syrian Interim Government
    - First Vice President –
      1. Hisham Ibrahim Marwah (2015–2016)
      2. Mouaffaq Nyrabia (2016–2017)
    - Second Vice President –
      1. Naghm Al Ghadri (2015–2016)
      2. Abdul Hakim Bashar (2016–2017)
    - Third Vice President –
      1. vacant (2015–2016)
      2. Samira al-Masalma (2016–2017)
- Taiwan (Republic of China) Vice President –
  1. Wu Den-yih (2012–2016)
  2. Chen Chien-jen (2016–2020)
- United Arab Emirates Vice President – Sheikh Mohammed bin Rashid Al Maktoum (2006–present)
- Vietnam Vice President –
  1. Nguyễn Thị Doan (2007–2016)
  2. Đặng Thị Ngọc Thịnh (2016–2021)
- Yemen
  - Republic of Yemen Vice President –
    1. Khaled Bahah (2015–2016)
    2. Ali Mohsen al-Ahmar (2016–present)

== Europe ==
- Bulgaria Vice President Margarita Popova (2012–2017)
- Cyprus Vice President - Vacant (1974–present)
- Germany President of the Bundesrat (Vice President ex officio) —
  - Stanislaw Tillich (2015–2016)
  - Malu Dreyer (2016–2017)
- Switzerland Vice President - Doris Leuthard (2016)

== North America and the Caribbean ==
- Costa Rica
  - First Vice President - Helio Fallas (2014–2018)
  - Second Vice President - Ana Helena Chacón (2014–2018)
- Cuba
  - First Vice President of Council of State - Miguel Díaz-Canel (2013–2018)
  - Others Vice Presidents of Council of State - Gladys María Bejerano Portela (2013–2019), Mercedes Lopez Acea (2013–2018), Jose Ramon Machado Ventura (2013–2018), Ramiro Valdes Menendez (2009–2019), Salvador Valdes Mesa (2013–2019)
- Dominican Republic Vice President - Margarita Cedeño de Fernández (2012–2020)
- El Salvador Vice President - Óscar Ortiz (2014–2019)
- Guatemala Vice President –
  1. Juan Alfonso Fuentes Soria (2015–2016)
  2. Jafeth Cabrera (2016–2020)
- Honduras
  - First Vice President - Ricardo Antonio Alvarez Arias (2014–2022)
  - Second Vice President - Ana Rossana Guevara Pinto (2014–2018)
  - Third Vice President - Lorena Enriqueta Herrera Estevez (2014–2018)
- Nicaragua Vice President - Omar Halleslevens (2012–2017)
- Panama Vice President - Isabel Saint Malo (2014–2019)
- United States Vice President - Joe Biden (2009–2017)

== Oceania ==
- Kiribati Vice President
  1. Teima Onorio (2003–2016)
  2. Kourabi Nenem (2016–2019)
- Micronesia Vice President - Yosiwo P. George (2015–present)
- Palau Vice President - Antonio Bells - (2013–2017)

== South America ==
- Argentina Vice President - Gabriela Michetti (2015–2019)
- Bolivia Vice President - Álvaro García Linera (2006–2019)
- Brazil
  - Vice President – Michel Temer (2011–2016)
  - Vice President – Vacant (2016–2018)
- Chile Minister of the Interior and Public Security (Vice President ex officio) - Jorge Burgos (2015–present)
- Colombia Vice President - Germán Vargas Lleras (2014–2017)
- Ecuador Vice President - Jorge Glas (2013–present)
- Guyana
  - First Vice President - Moses Nagamootoo (2015–2020)
  - Second Vice President - Khemraj Ramjattan (2015–2020)
  - Third Vice President - Carl Greenidge (2015–2019)
  - Fourth Vice President - Sydney Allicock (2015–2020)
- Paraguay Vice President - Juan Afara (2013–2018)
- Peru
  - First Vice President -
    1. Marsol Espinoza (2011–2016)
    2. Martín Vizcarra (2016–2018)
  - Second Vice President -
    1. vacant (2012–2016)
    2. Mercedes Aráoz (2016–2018)
- Suriname Vice President - Ashwin Adhin (2015–2020)
- Uruguay Vice President - Raúl Sendic (2015–2017)
- Venezuela Vice President -
  1. Jorge Arreaza (2013–2016)
  2. Aristóbulo Istúriz (2016–2017)

== See also ==
- List of current vice presidents and designated acting presidents
- List of vice presidents in 2017
