= List of vice presidents in 2018 =

This is a list of vice presidents in 2018.

== Africa ==
- Angola Vice President - Bornito de Sousa (2017–present)
- Botswana Vice President –
  1. Mokgweetsi Masisi (2014–2018)
  2. Slumber Tsogwane (2018–present)
- Burundi
  - First Vice President – Gaston Sindimwo (2015–2020)
  - Second Vice President - Joseph Butore (2015–2020)
- Comoros - Vice Presidents - Djaffar Ahnwd Said Hassani ( Vice President in charge of the Ministry of Economy, Planning, Industry, Crafts, Investments, Private Sector and Land Affairs) (2016–2018), - Moustadroine Abdou (Vice President in Charge of the Ministry of Agriculture, Fishing, Environment, Spatial Planning and Urbanism) (2016–2018), Abdallah Said Sarouma (Vice President in Charge of the Minister of Transport, Posts and Telecommunication and Information and Communication Technology) (2016–2018)
- Equatorial Guinea Vice President - Teodoro Nguema Obiang Mangue (2016–2018)
- Gabon Vice President - Pierre-Claver Maganga Moussavou (2017–2019)
- The Gambia Vice President -
  1. Fatoumata Tambajang (2017–2018)
  2. Ousainou Darboe (2018–2019)
- Ghana Vice President - Mahamudu Bawumia (2017–present)
- Ivory Coast (Côte d'Ivoire) Vice President - Daniel Kablan Duncan (2017–2020)
- Kenya Deputy President - William Ruto (2012–present)
- Liberia Vice President -
  1. Joseph Boakai (2006–2018)
  2. Jewel Taylor (2018–present)
- Libya
  - Government of National Accord of Libya (Interim government internationally recognized as the sole legitimate government of Libya from 12 March 2016) - Vice Presidents of the Presidential Council of Libya (Tripoli) - Fathi Al-Majbari (2016–2018), Abdulsalam Kajman (2016–2021), Ahmed Maiteeq (2016–2021), Ali Faraj Qatrani (2016–2019)
  - 'Government of House of Representatives of Libya' (Government of Libya internationally recognized to 12 March 2016) Deputy presidents of the House of Representatives of Libya - Imhemed Shaib (2014–2021). Ahmed Huma (2014–2021)
- Malawi Vice President - Saulos Chilima (2014–2019)
- Mauritius Vice President – Barlen Vyapoory (2016–2019)
- Namibia Vice President -
  1. Nicky Iyambo (2015–2018)
  2. Nangolo Mbumba (2018–present)
- Nigeria Vice President - Yemi Osinbajo (2015–present)
- Seychelles Vice President - Vincent Meriton (2016–2020)
- Sierra Leone Vice President -
  1. Victor Bockarie Foh (2015–2018)
  2. Mohamed Juldeh Jalloh (2018–present)
- Somaliland Vice President - Abdirahman Saylici (2010–present)
- South Africa Deputy President -
  1. Cyril Ramaphosa (2014–2018)
  2. David Mabuza (2018–present)
- South Sudan
  - First Vice President - Taban Deng Gai (2016–2020)
  - Vice President - James Wani Igga (2016–2020)
- Sudan
  - First Vice President – Bakri Hassan Saleh (2013–2019)
  - Second Vice President -
    1. Hassabu Mohamed Abdalrahman (2013–2018)
    2. Osman Kebir (2018–2019)
- Tanzania Vice President - Samia Suluhu (2015–2021)
  - Zanzibar
    - First Vice President – Seif Sharif Hamad (2010–2019)
    - Second Vice President – Seif Ali Iddi (2010–2020)
- Uganda Vice President - Edward Ssekandi (2011–2021)
- Zambia Vice President - Inonge Wina (2015–2021)
- Zimbabwe
  - First Vice Presidents – Constantino Chiwenga (2017–present)
  - Second Vice President – Kembo Mohadi (2017–2021)

== Asia ==
- Abkhazia Vice President - Vitali Gabnia (2014–2018)
- Afghanistan
  - First Vice President - Abdul Rashid Dostum (2014–2020)
  - Second Vice President - Sarwar Danish (2014–2021)
- Azerbaijan Vice President - Mehriban Aliyeva (2017–present)
- China (People's Republic of China) Vice President -
  1. Li Yuanchao (2013–2018)
  2. Wang Qishan (2018–present)
- India Vice President -Venkaiah Naidu (2017–present)
- Indonesia Vice President - Jusuf Kalla (2014–2019)
- Iran
  - First Vice President - Eshaq Jahangiri (2013–2021)
  - Others Vice Presidents - Mohammad Nahavandian (Vice President for Economic Affairs) (2017–2021), Mohammad Bagher Nobakht (Vice President and Head of Management and Planning Organization) (2016–2021), Laya Joneidi (Vice President for Legal Affairs) (2017–2021), Hossein-Ali Amiri (Vice President for Parliamentary Affairs) (2017–2021), Sorena Sattari (Vice President for Science and Technology Affaires) (2013–2022), Masoumeh Ebtekar (Vice President for Women's and Family Affairs) (2017–2021), Ali Asghar Mounesan (Vice President of Cultural Heritage and Tourism Organization) (2017–2019), Ali Akbar Salehi (Vice President and Head of Atomic Energy Organization) (2013–2021), Mohammad-Ali Shahidi (Vice President and Head of Martyrs and Self-sacrifice's Affairs Foundation) (2016–2020). Jamshid Ansari (Vice President and Head of Administrative and Recruitment Organization) (2016–2021), Isa Kalantari (Vice President and Head of Environmental Protection Organization) (2017–2021)
- Iraq Vice Presidents - Nouri al-Maliki (2016–2018), Usama al-Nujayfi (2016–2018), Ayad Allawi (2016–2018)
  - Kurdistan Vice President- vacant (2017–2019)
- North Korea (Democratic People's Republic of Korea)
  - Vice presidents de facto - Vice Chairmen of State Affairs Commission - Choe Ryong-hae (2016–present), Pak Pong-ju (2016–2021), Hwang Pyong-so (2016–2018)
  - Vice presidents de jure - Vice Chairmen of the Presidium of Supreme People's Assembly - Kim Yong-dae (2009–present), Yang Hyong-sop (1998–2019), Choe Yong-rim (honorary) (2011–2019), Kim Yong-ju (honorary) (1998–2019)
- Laos Vice President – Phankham Viphavanh (2016–2021)
- Maldives Vice President –
  1. Abdulla Jihad (2016–2018)
  2. Faisal Naseem (2018–2023)
- Myanmar
  - First Vice President – Myint Swe (2016–2021)
  - Second Vice President – Henry Van Thio (2016–present)
- Nepal Vice President - Nanda Bahadur Pun (2015–present)
- Philippines Vice President – Leni Robredo (2016–present)
- Syria
  - Syrian Arab Republic Vice President – Najah al-Attar ((2006–present))
  - Syrian Interim Government
    - First Vice President –
    1. Abdulrahman Mustafa, (2017–2018)
    2. Abdul Basset Hamou, (2018–2019)
    - Second Vice President –
    1. Salwa Ktaw (2017–2018)
    2. Badr Jamous (2018–2019)
    - Third Vice President – Dima Moussa (2018–2020)
- Taiwan (Republic of China) Vice President – Chen Chien-jen (2016–2020)
- Turkey Vice President – Fuat Oktay (2018–present)
- United Arab Emirates Vice President – Sheikh Mohammed bin Rashid Al Maktoum (2006–present)
- Vietnam Vice President – Đặng Thị Ngọc Thịnh (2016–2021)
- Yemen
  - Republic of Yemen Vice President – Ali Mohsen al-Ahmar (2016–present)

== Europe ==
- Bulgaria Vice President - Iliana Iotova (2017–present)
- Cyprus Vice President - Vacant (1974–present)
- Switzerland Vice President - Ueli Maurer (2018)

== North America and the Caribbean ==
- Costa Rica
  - First Vice President -
  1. Helio Fallas (2014–2018)
  2. Epsy Campbell Barr (2018–present)
  - Second Vice President -
  1. Ana Helena Chacón (2014–2018)
  2. Marvin Rodríguez Cordero (2018–present)
- Cuba
  - First Vice President of Council of State -
    1. Miguel Díaz-Canel (2013–2018)
    2. Salvador Valdés Mesa (2018–2019)
  - Others Vice Presidents of Council of State - Gladys María Bejerano Portela (2013–2019), Mercedes Lopez Acea (2013–2918), Roberto Tomás Morales Ojeda (2018–2019), Jose Ramon Machado Ventura (2013–2918), Inés María Chapman (2018–2019), Ramiro Valdes Menendez (2009–2019), Salvador Valdes Mesa (2013–2019), Beatriz Jhonson (2018–2019)
- Dominican Republic Vice President - Margarita Cedeño de Fernández (2012–2020)
- El Salvador Vice President - Óscar Ortiz (2014–2019)
- Guatemala Vice President – Jafeth Cabrera (2016–2020)
- Honduras
  - First Vice President - Ricardo Antonio Alvarez Arias (2014–2022)
  - Second Vice President -
    1. Ana Rossana Guevara Pinto (2014–2018)
    2. Olga Margarita Alvarado Rodríguez (2018–2022)
  - Third Vice President -
    1. Lorena Enriqueta Herrera Estevez (2014–2018)
    2. María Antonia Rivera Rosales (2018–2022)
- Nicaragua Vice President - Rosario Murillo (2017–present)
- Panama Vice President - Isabel Saint Malo (2014–2019)
- United States Vice President - Mike Pence (2017–2021)

== Oceania ==
- Kiribati Vice President – Kourabi Nenem (2016–2019)
- Micronesia Vice President - Yosiwo P. George (2015–present)
- Palau Vice President - Raynold Oilouch - (2017–present)
- Samoa
  - Member of Council of Deputies – vacant (2017–present)
  - Member of Council of Deputies – Tuiloma Pule Lameko (2016–2018)
  - Member of Council of Deputies – Le Mamea Ropati (2016–present)

== South America ==
- Argentina Vice President - Gabriela Michetti (2015–2019)
- Bolivia Vice President - Álvaro García Linera (2006–2019)
- Brazil Vice President – vacant (2016–2018)
- Colombia Vice President -
  1. Óscar Naranjo (2017–2018)
  2. Marta Lucía Ramírez (2018–present)
- Ecuador Vice President -
  1. Jorge Glas (2013–2018)
  2. María Vicuña (2017–2018)
  3. José Augusto Briones (acting) (2018)
  4. Otto Sonnenholzner (2018–2020)
- Guyana
  - First Vice President - Moses Nagamootoo (2015–2020)
  - Second Vice President - Khemraj Ramjattan (2015–2020)
  - Third Vice President - Carl Greenidge (2015–2019)
  - Fourth Vice President - Sydney Allicock (2015–2020)
- Paraguay Vice President -
  1. Juan Afara (2013–2018)
  2. Alicia Pucheta (2018)
  3. Hugo Velázquez Moreno (2018–present)
- Peru
  - First Vice President -
    1. Mercedes Aráoz (2018–2020)
    2. Martín Vizcarra (2016–2018)
  - Second Vice President - Mercedes Aráoz (2016–2018)
- Suriname Vice President - Ashwin Adhin (2015–2020)
- Uruguay Vice President - Lucía Topolansky (2017–2020)
- Venezuela Vice President -
  1. Tareck El Aissami (2017–2018)
  2. Delcy Rodríguez (2018–present)

== See also ==
- List of current vice presidents and designated acting presidents
