= Omar Al-Aswad =

Libyan politician

Omar Al-Aswad is a Libyan politician who has been serving on the Presidential Council of Libya since 2016. He represents the western town of Zintan, which is a powerful political faction in the country.
