= Fatou Sanyang Kinteh =

Gambian politician, human rights activist and women's rights activist

- Education: Gambia High School
- Alma mater: Fourah Bay College; Cardiff University
- Occupations: politician, women's rights activist

Fatou Sanyang Kinteh also known as Fatou Kinteh is a Gambian politician and women's rights activist. She currently serves as the Gambian minister for women's affairs, children, and social welfare. She also serves as the national coordinator of The Gambia for Gender-Based Violence and Female Genital Mutilation.

== Career ==
Fatou attended the Gambia High School in Banjul and studied sociology. She studied history at the Fourah Bay College, Freetown, Sierra Leone, graduating with a bachelor's degree. In 1999, she pursued a master's degree at Cardiff University.

After returning to the Gambia, she worked for Gambia Family Planning Association (GFPA) for over seven years. She served as a gender lecturer at the University of the Gambia for a brief period. She also served as a deputy executive director and executive director of the Gambian Women's Bureau.

She has worked with the United Nations for several years especially being affiliated with United Nations Population Fund (UNPFA) as a Gambian national coordinator in the fight against female genital mutilation. During her stint as the executive director of the Women's Bureau, she initiated the development and implementation of the first gender component of the UNPFA Country Programme in The Gambia.

In March 2019, she was appointed as the minister for women's affairs, children and social welfare of The Gambia by the Gambian President Adama Barrow. The ministry for women's affairs, children and social welfare was newly created by the Government of Gambia in 2019 and Fatou Kinteh was appointed as its first minister. After becoming a cabinet minister, Kinteh vowed to pass the Women Enterprise Fund Bill 2020 to support the women entrepreneurs in The Gambia. She also formulated policies and intended to launch a national NO MORE campaign in order to safeguard the women and children from domestic violence and harassment which spiked during the COVID-19 pandemic in The Gambia. She also launched Working Group for Peace Building for West Africa (WGPBWA) Gambia chapter in June 2019.

In August 2020, she was tested positive for COVID-19. She recovered from the disease in September 2020.
