= Renato Álvarez =

Honduran journalist

Renato Álvarez Vásquez (born 2 December 1960 in El Porvenir, Francisco Morazán) is a journalist from Honduras. He is the presenter of the national newcast TN5. He has become news himself after being condemned to 2 years and 8 months in prison for announcing the story originally published in Mexico about a corruption known as grey traffic (tráfico gris) in the Empresa Hondureña de Telecomunicaciones (Hondutel) which is the nationalised telecommunications company for Honduras.

On September 28, 2007 Hondutel chief Marcelo Chimirri filed lawsuits, naming Renato Álvarez and Ava Rossana Guevara of the TV station Televicentro, Melissa Amaya and Juan Carlos Funes of radio Cadena Voces, Carlos Mauricio Flores, the editor of the daily El Heraldo, and Nelson Fernández, managing editor of the newspaper La Prensa. They are accused of “attacking his reputation” by repeating the El Universal’s allegations of embezzlement within Hondutel.

His parents are Irma Vásquez and Miguel Angel Álvarez.

From Monday to Friday he runs a News program on the Honduran television Televicentro Canal 5 El Lider called Frente a Frente.

Cuenta con un patrimonio de $ 1.2 millones de dólares y en su moneda natal de L 35 millones de lempiras, tambien tiene diversas inversiones en empresas de comunicación el cual aún no ha sido estimado su valor.
