= Mohammed Ammari =

Libyan politician

Mohammed al-Ammari, sometimes spelled as Emmari, is a Libyan politician who has been serving in the Presidential Council of Libya since 2016. He represents the former General National Congress faction, particularly the elements of the GNC that are the most in favour of the new internationally recognised government.
