= Minister of Women's Affairs (The Gambia) =

Minister of Women's Affairs of the Gambia
- Coat of Arms
- Incumbent; Fatou Sanyang Kinteh since 1 March 2019
- Appointer: President of the Gambia
- Inaugural holder: Isatou Njie-Saidy
- Formation: July 1996

The minister of women's affairs is a cabinet-level position in the Gambia, typically held at the same time as another cabinet position. The ministry was created by Yahya Jammeh, as head of the Armed Forces Provisional Ruling Council, in July 1996, and the position has only ever had two holders: Jammeh's vice-president, Isatou Njie-Saidy, and Adama Barrow's acting vice-president, Fatoumata Tambajang. Njie-Saidy had formerly served as executive secretary of the National Women's Bureau under Dawda Jawara, whereas Tambajang had been chair of the Gambia National Women's Council under Jawara.

== List of ministers of women's affairs, 1996–present ==
Name (Birth–Death)	Term of office		Political party	President
Isatou Njie-Saidy (1952–)	July 1996	18 January 2017	APRC	Yahya Jammeh
Fatoumata Tambajang (1949–)	22 February 2017	29 June 2018	UDP	Adama Barrow
Ousainou Darboe (1948–)	29 June 2018	1 March 2019	UDP	Adama Barrow
Fatou Sanyang Kinteh	1 March 2019	Incumbent		Adama Barrow
