= Abdullah al-Lafi =

Libyan politician

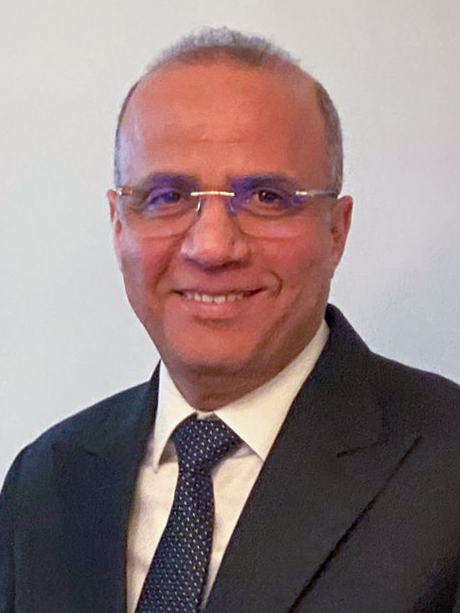
- al-Lafi in 2023

Vice Chairman of the Presidential Council
- Incumbent
- Assumed office 15 March 2021
- President: Mohamed al-Menfi
- Preceded by: Ahmed Maiteeq

Personal details
- Born: 1968 (age 57–58)

Abdullah al-Lafi is a politician from Libya who serving as Vice-Chairman or Vice-President and Deputy Head of Presidential Council of Libya and Representative of Presidential Council of Libya.

== Biography ==
Lafi assumed his duties as Vice-President of the Libyan Presidential Council on March 15, 2021, under the presidency of Mohamed al-Menfi. The Presidential Council (al-Majlis ar-Rīʾāsiy) is a body established under the Libyan Political Agreement, signed on December 17, 2015. The Council acts as the head of state of Libya and is mandated to assume command of the Libyan armed forces.

The agreement was unanimously endorsed by the United Nations and the Security Council, which welcomed the creation of the Presidential Council and recognized the Government of National Unity as the sole legitimate executive government of Libya. Following the withdrawal of recognition of the Government of National Unity by the House of Representatives in 2022 and the establishment of a rival government, the Presidential Council remains responsible for the Government of National Unity.

Al Lafi stated in November 2025 that the independence of the judiciary remains an essential guarantee for the protection of citizens' rights and respect for the rule of law. He emphasized that court decisions are binding and enforceable automatically, and must be respected without exception by all state institutions.
