= Ahmad Hamza Al-Mahdi =

Libyan politician

Ahmad Hamza al-Mahdi

Minister of State for Civil Society Affairs
- In office 30 March 2016 – 15 March 2021
- President: Fayez al-Sarraj

Ahmad Hamza al-Mahdi is a Libyan politician who has been a member of the Presidential Council of Libya since 2016, which is the executive body of the Government of National Accord.
