= Mohamed al-Menfi =

Libyan politician (born 1976)

- محمد المنفي
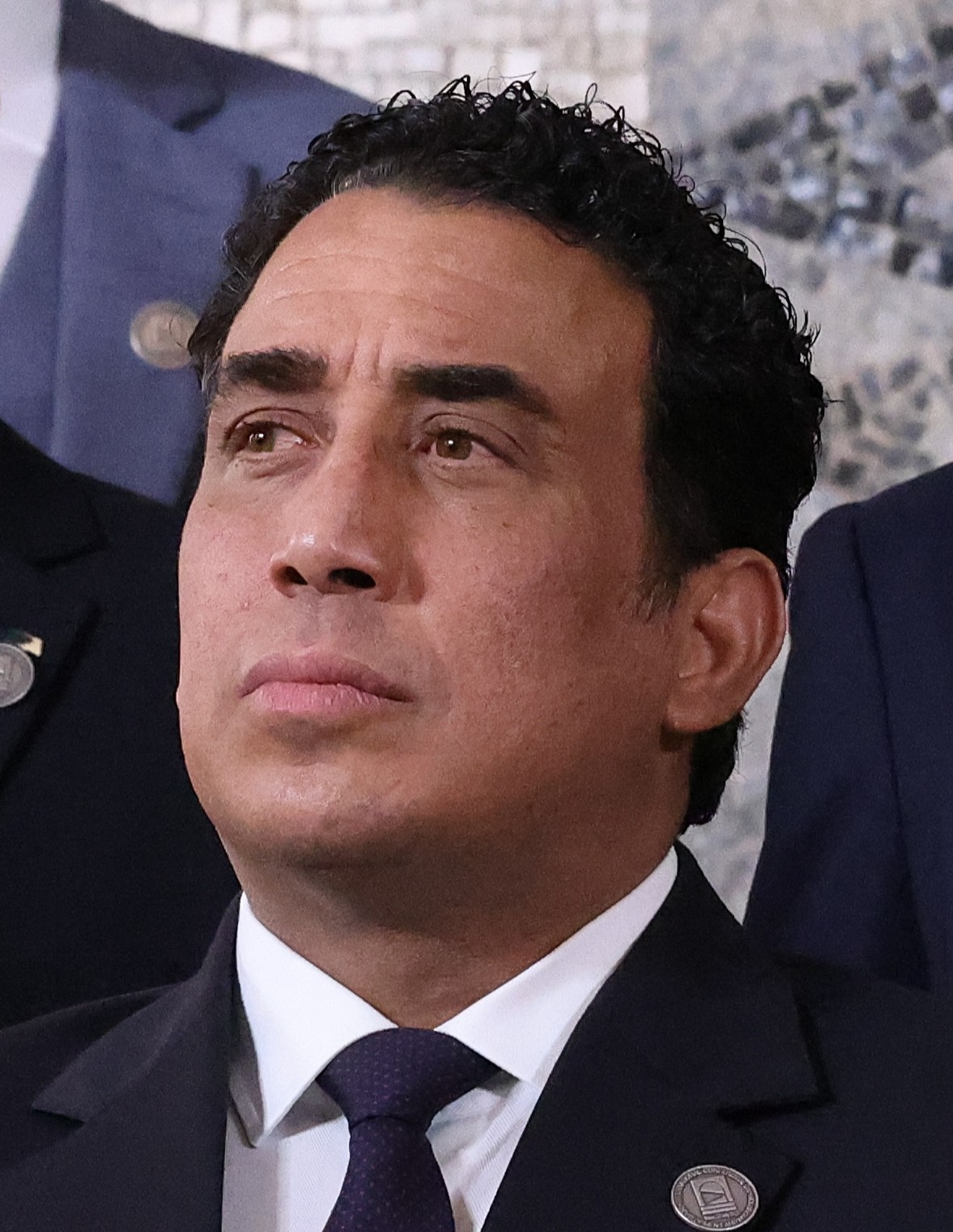
- Al-Menfi in 2023

2nd Chairman of the Presidential Council of Libya
- Incumbent
- Assumed office 15 March 2021
- Prime Minister: Abdul Hamid Dbeibeh (Note: Disputed by Fathi Bashagha from 3 March 2022 to 16 May 2023 and Osama Hammad since 16 May 2023.)
- Vice President: Musa Al-Koni; Abdullah al-Lafi
- Preceded by: Fayez al-Sarraj

Libyan Ambassador to Greece
- In office 19 December 2018 – 6 December 2019
- President: Fayez al-Sarraj
- Preceded by: Ahmed Gezlal
- Succeeded by: Hamad Bashir Mabrouk

Personal details
- Born: Mohamed Younis Ahmed Al-Menfi; 3 March 1976 (age 50) Tobruk, Libya (Note: Libya was officially known as the Libyan Arab Republic at the time of al-Menfi's birth.)
- Spouses: Amira al-Hassi (m. 2000; div. 2004); Sara al-Menfi (m. 2005)
- Education: Tobruk University
- Profession: Diplomat

Mohamed Yunus al-Menfi (Arabic: محمد يونس المنفي; born 3 March 1976) is a Libyan diplomat and politician. On 5 February 2021, he was chosen as the chairman of the Libyan Presidential Council at the Libyan Political Dialogue Forum. Previously, he had served as the Libyan Ambassador to Greece.

== Ambassadorship ==
Al-Menfi's period as ambassador in Athens was marked by a tense relationship between the GNA and the Greek government because of the Libyan (GNA)–Turkish accord on maritime boundaries. The row is part of a long-running dispute between Turkey and Greece over drilling rights in the Mediterranean. He was eventually expelled from Athens in December 2019.

== Presidency of Presidential Council ==
In the Libyan Political Dialogue Forum procedure for choosing a unified executive authority to lead into the 24 December 2021 Libyan general election, Al-Menfi ran on a joint ticket with Abdul Hamid Dbeibeh as prime minister and Musa Al-Koni and Abdullah al-Lafi as members of the Presidential Council. Their list obtained 39 votes, five more than that of Aguila Saleh Issa and Fathi Bashagha. The U.S. ambassador denied any attempt to influence the electoral process against Al-Menfi.

== 2024 Central Bank Crisis and UNGA visit ==
Al-Menfi controversially ousted the former governor of Libya's Central Bank, Sadiq Al-Kabir, in August 2024.

In his first interview with Western reporters a month later, he justified the ousting by citing that Kabir had been mismanaging the banks finances "without any form of accountability," and was "exploiting the state of division" between East and West Libya."

A bilateral deal struck between al-Menfi's Tripoli government and Haftar's Tobruk government on 25 September 2024, agreed upon an interim governor and financial committee for the bank. Al-Menfi described the deal as crucial in "sparing the capital, Tripoli, from a certain war that would directly target the central bank". The deal was brokered by the UN mission in Libya and is yet to be ratified by the country's Eastern and Western government representative bodies, as of September 2024.

Following the deal, al-Menfi has expressed his optimism for Libya's long-term economic prospects and the hopes for the country's diversification away from oil dependencies.

In an effort to widen Tripoli's exposure to international business and industry, al-Menfi also attended an American Chamber of Commerce (Libya) event while in New York for the 2024 United Nations General Assembly Summit, signing an agreement to support sustainable economic development and the participation of American companies in Libya's market.
