= Fathi Al-Majbari =

Libyan politician

Fathi al-Majbari

Vice Chairman of the Presidential Council of Libya
- In office 30 March 2016 – 18 July 2018 Serving with Ahmed Maiteeq, Musa Al-Koni, Abdulsalam Kajman, Ali Faraj Qatrani
- President: Fayez al-Sarraj
- Preceded by: Imhemed Shaib & Ahmed Huma (Deputy Presidents of the House of Representatives)

Personal details
- Party: Petroleum Facilities Guard

Fathi al-Majbari is a Libyan politician who served on the Presidential Council of Libya from 2016 to 2018. He was previously closely allied to the commander of the Petroleum Facilities Guard. Being one of the five Vice Presidents, he resigned from the council in July 2018, after being investigated for corruption. He later tried to appoint himself the head of the National Oil Corporation, but this failed.
