= Fatoumata Tambajang =

Gambian politician and activist

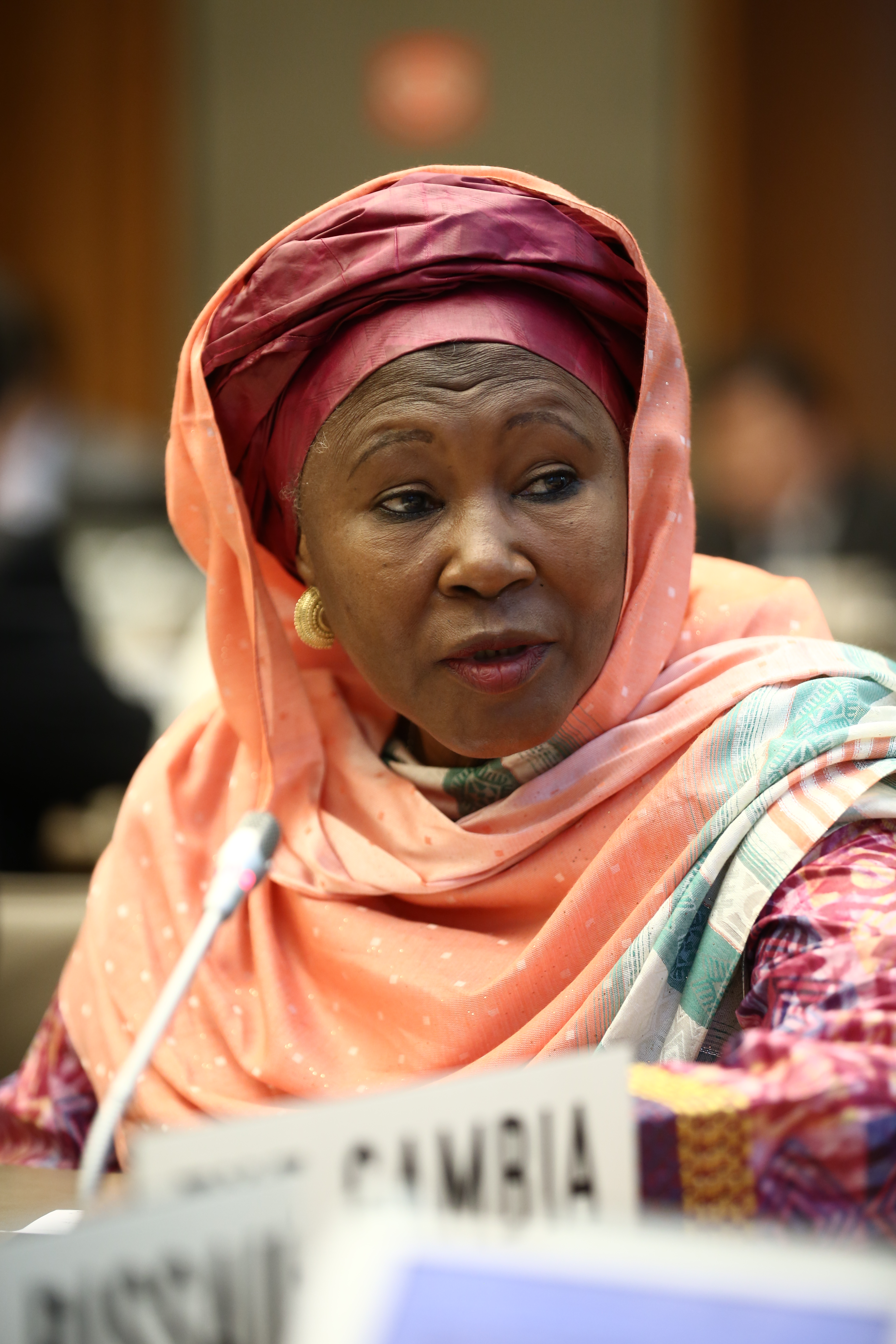
- Tambajang in 2017

8th Vice-President of the Gambia
- In office 9 November 2017 – 29 June 2018; Acting: 23 January 2017 – 9 November 2017
- President: Adama Barrow
- Preceded by: Isatou Njie-Saidy
- Succeeded by: Ousainou Darboe

Minister of Women's Affairs
- In office 22 February 2017 – 29 June 2018
- President: Adama Barrow
- Preceded by: Isatou Njie-Saidy (as Secretary)
- Succeeded by: Ousainou Darboe

Secretary of State for Health and Social Welfare
- In office 1994–1995
- President: Yahya Jammeh
- Preceded by: Landing J. Sonko
- Succeeded by: Nyimasata Sanneh-Bojang

Personal details
- Born: 22 October 1949 (age 76) Brikama, the Gambia
- Citizenship: Gambian
- Party: UDP
- Other political affiliations: Coalition 2016
- Children: 8
- Education: University of Nice Sophia Antipolis
- Ethnicity: Fula

Aja Fatoumata C.M. Jallow-Tambajang (born 22 October 1949) is a Gambian politician and activist who served as Vice-President of the Gambia and minister of women's affairs from February 2017 to June 2018, under President Adama Barrow.

Early in her career she had been the chair of the Gambia National Women's Council and an advisor to Dawda Jawara, the first president of the Gambia as a nation independent from the colonial rule of the British Empire. After the military coup d'état in July 1994 that deposed the Jawara government, she held the post of secretary of state for health and social welfare from 1994 to 1995 in the cabinet of the Armed Forces Provisional Ruling Council.

She was appointed as vice-president by Barrow in January 2017, but was found ineligible due to constitutional age restrictions. She was instead made minister of women's affairs overseeing the office of vice-president, until the constitution was changed and she was formally sworn in as vice-president in November 2017. Prior to her appointment, she had served as chair of Coalition 2016, the alliance of opposition political parties that had supported Barrow's candidacy in the 2016 presidential election.

== Early life and education ==
Tambajang was born in Brikama, the Gambia. She was educated in the Gambia, Dakar and France. She completed a BA in French at the University of Nice Sophia Antipolis.

== Political career ==
Tambajang was an advisor to Dawda Jawara, the first President of the Gambia, on women's issues and children's affairs. She chaired the Gambia National Women's Council and represented it in the Gambia National Economic and Social Council for six years.

Tambajang served as the Secretary of State for Health and Social Welfare from 1994 to 1995 in the Armed Forces Provisional Ruling Council cabinet. She was one of two female ministers in the cabinet, alongside Susan Waffa-Ogoo. She addressed the International Conference on Population and Development in September 1994 on behalf of the Gambia. She then went on to work for the United Nations Development Programme (UNDP) and in the field of development, including 5 years in war-torn Mano River. In 2001, whilst working in the African Great Lakes, she was the victim of a rebel hostage situation.

Tambajang joined the United Democratic Party (UDP) in April 2015, during the Fass stand-off with security forces. Tambajang was a senior member of Coalition 2016, the alliance of political opposition parties that supported Barrow in the 2016 presidential election, and she also served as its chair. Following President Yahya Jammeh's defeat in the election, Tambajang declared that Jammeh would be prosecuted within a year. She also announced the creation of a national commission for asset recovery in order to reclaim what had allegedly been lost through corruption during Jammeh's tenure. On Jammeh, she told The Guardian that "He can't leave. If he leaves, he's going to escape us."

=== Process of appointment to the vice-presidency ===
Following Barrow's inauguration on 19 January 2017, on 23 January it was announced that Tambajang would serve as his Vice-President. However, after her selection, it was suggested that she was constitutionally ineligible to take on the role. This was because section 62(1)(b) of the Constitution of the Gambia states that the vice-president must meet the same age requirement as the president, establishing a maximum age of 65 at the time of entering the office – whereas Tambajang was reported to be 67 at the time of her selection. Following the reports, she was not sworn in immediately to the post, although she disputed the reported age – saying she was only 64 years old. Barrow challenged the public to show proof that she was above age 65. In February, she was appointed as minister of women's affairs, with oversight of the vice-president's office.

On 28 February 2017, the National Assembly tried to approve a change to the constitution to eliminate the age limit. However, Halifa Sallah, the spokesman for the transitional government and an advisor to President Barrow, said that the proper procedure had not been followed for amending the constitution, and that the action needed to be revisited and such a change would take an additional several months to properly accomplish (according to section 226 of the constitution).

Section 62 was amended by National Assembly of the Gambia on 25 July with the presidential age-limit being removed. Her appointment as vice-president was confirmed by the president on 8 September and after finalization of her appointment, she was expected to be sworn-in. President Barrow announced officially appointing her as Vice-President on 9 November.

=== Vice-Presidency ===
Tambajang was awarded 'New African Woman of the Year Award' by New African Woman Magazine in April 2017. In March 2017, Tambajang joined the Crans Montana African Women's Forum Honorary Committee. During a cabinet reshuffle on 29 June 2018, Tambajang was redeployed to the foreign service.

== Personal life ==
Tambajang is from the Fula ethnic group and resides in Kanifing District. She is the mother of eight children.
