= Sandra Naranjo =

Ecuadorian politician (born 1985)

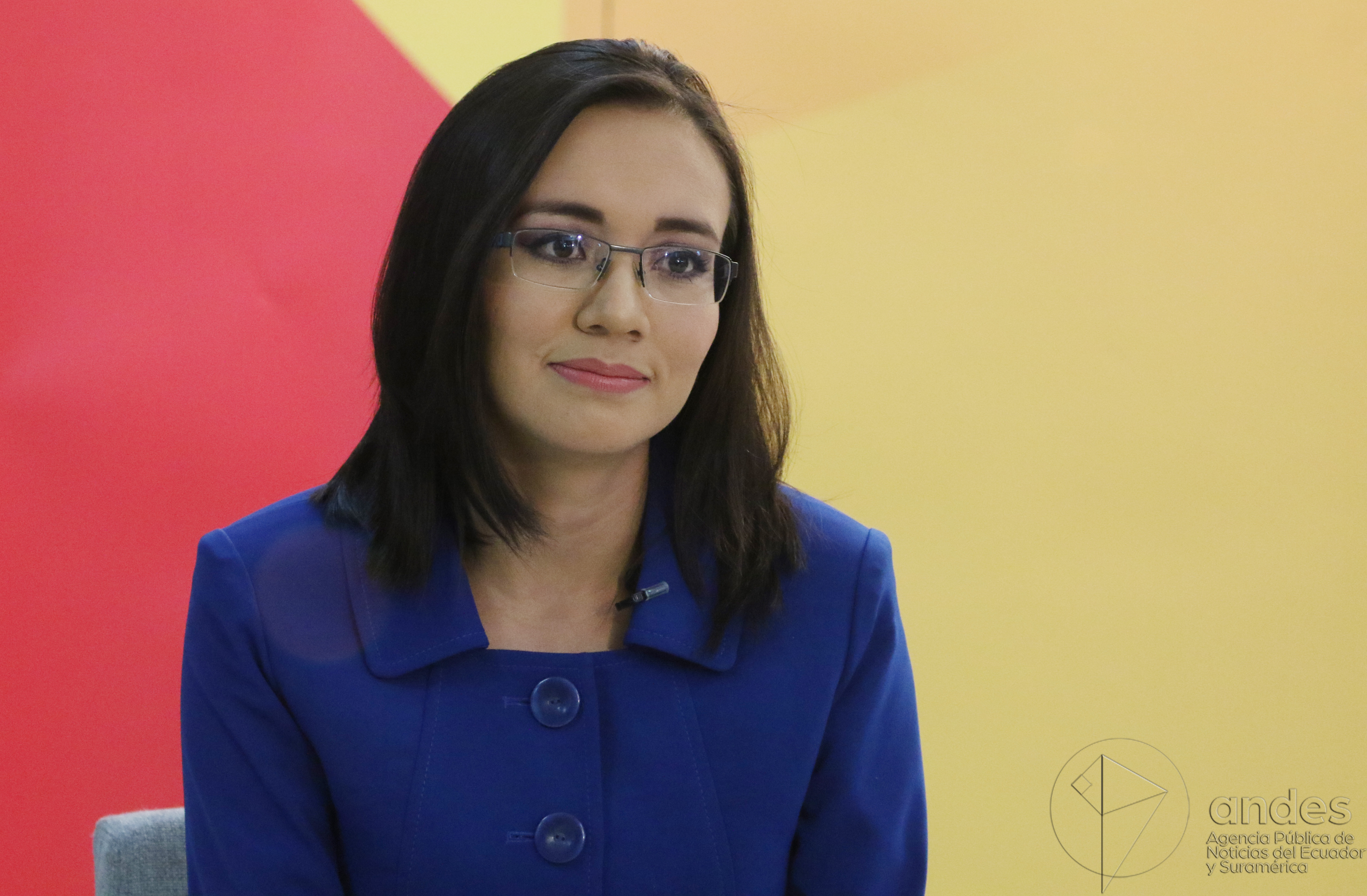

Vice President of Ecuador (interim)
- In office January 4, 2017 – February 20, 2017
- President: Rafael Correa
- Preceded by: Jorge Glas
- Succeeded by: Jorge Glas
- In office March 13, 2017 – March 30, 2017

Ministry of Tourism
- In office June 30, 2014 – October 15, 2015
- President: Rafael Correa
- Preceded by: Vinicio Alvarado Espinel
- Succeeded by: Fernando Alvarado Espinel

Personal details
- Born: 1985 (age 40–41) Ambato, Ecuador
- Education: San Francisco University, Quito; Latin American Social Sciences Institute; John F. Kennedy School of Government
- Occupation: Economist and politician

Sandra Naranjo Bautista (born 1985, Ambato) is an Ecuadorian politician and economist.

== Education ==
Naranjo studied at the Universidad San Francisco de Quito, has a diploma from the Latin American Social Sciences Institute, and a master's degree in public administration and international development from Harvard University's John F. Kennedy School of Government.

== Career ==
Naranjo served as Ecuador's Minister of Tourism from June 2014 to October 2015 and then as the national secretary of planning and development. On January 4, 2017, Naranjo became interim Vice President of Ecuador by President Rafael Correa's Executive Order 1291, when the incumbent Jorge Glas was given leave without pay.
