= Isatou Njie-Saidy =

Gambian politician

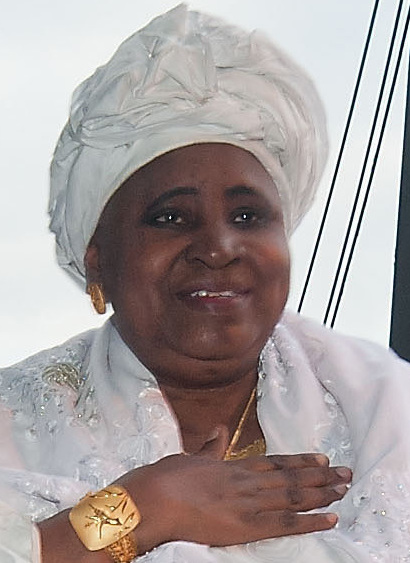
- Njie-Saidy in 2012

7th Vice-President of the Gambia
- In office 20 March 1997 – 18 January 2017
- President: Yahya Jammeh
- Preceded by: Saihou Sabally
- Succeeded by: Fatoumata Tambajang

Secretary of State of Social Welfare, Health and Women's Affairs
- In office 20 March 1997 – 18 January 2017
- President: Yahya Jammeh
- Preceded by: Nyimasata Sanneh-Bojang
- Succeeded by: Fatoumata Tambajang

Personal details
- Born: 15 March 1952 (age 74) Kuntaya, North Bank Division, Gambia
- Party: APRC

Isatou Njie-Saidy (also spelt Aisatu N'Jie-Saidy; born 5 March 1952) is a Gambian politician. She was Vice President of the Gambia, as well as Secretary of State for Women's Affairs, from 20 March 1997 to 18 January 2017. She is the first Gambian woman to have held the position of Vice President and one of the first women in West African politics to reach this senior position.

== Early life and education ==
Njie-Saidy was born in Kuntaya on March 15th,1952 North Bank Division. From 1959 to 1964, she attended Brikama Primary School, and from 1964 and 1970, she studied at Armitage High School, Georgetown. In 1971, she attended Yundum Teacher Training College, where she qualified as a teacher in 1974. From July 1979 to December 1979, she studied at the Research Institute for Management Science, Delft University of Technology, in Netherlands, where she was awarded a post-graduate diploma in industrial management. From September to November 1981, she studied at the University of the Philippines, where she obtained a certificate in small-scale industrial information management. In September 1988, she completed a Masters of Science in Social and Economic Development at the University of Swansea.

== Political career ==
From September 1983 to December 1989, Njie-Saidy was Deputy Executive Secretary of the Women's Bureau, the executive decision-making body of the National Women's Council. Two years after the 1994 Gambian coup d'état in which Yahya Jammeh seized power, in July 1996 Njie-Saidy was appointed as Minister of Health, Social Welfare and Women's Affairs. On March 20th, 1997 a few months after the 1996 presidential election which was won President Jammeh, Njie-Saidy was appointed as Vice-President of the Gambia and Secretary of State for Health, Social Welfare and Women's Affairs.

She has spoken and written extensively about women's issues in the Gambia.

In December 2015, Njie-Saidy's relationship with Jammeh was strained. According to Freedom Newspaper, a close aide of Jammeh reported that "Jammeh has intimated to them that he doesn't want to see Isatou Njie Saidy. He branded Isatou as a 'bad person' who contributed towards his government's failure. Jammeh told his aides that he is going to replace Isatou Njie Saidy."

On 18 January 2017, Njie-Saidy resigned in the midst of the 2016–17 constitutional crisis, along with several other government ministers.

== Personal life ==
Njie-Saidy is married and has four children. She speaks Mandinka, Fulani, Wolof, English and French.
