= Samira al-Masalma =

Syrian journalist

Samira al-Masalma (Arabic: سميرة المسالمة) was the editor in chief at the Syrian government newspaper Tishrīn who was fired in 2011 after giving an interview to Al Jazeera about protests in Daraa. Later, she was the Vice President of the Syrian Opposition.

She was "the first woman to receive such a media position in Syria in 2008". Her career began in 1991 at Al-Masirah, the newspaper of the Revolutionary Youth Union. She went on to work for SANA Syrian Arab News Agency and Al-Thawra.
