= Nyimasata Sanneh-Bojang =

Gambian politician

Personal details
- Born: 1941
- Died: 15 July 2015 (aged 73–74)

Aja Nyimasata Sanneh-Bojang (1941 – 15 July 2015) was a Gambian politician. She was the first woman to be elected to the Gambian National Assembly, when she won the seat of Northern Kombo for the People's Progressive Party. Although she kept the seat in 1987, she was deselected by her party and did not contest the 1992 election.

Sanneh-Bojang was born in 1941. She started her career as a nurse and later worked as a teacher. She was part of People's Progressive Party and later the Alliance for Patriotic Reorientation and Construction. From 2006 until her death in 2015, she served as the Director of GAMCOTRAP, working for women's empowerment.

== Early life ==
Sanneh-Bojang started her career as a nurse and then as an unqualified teacher. She qualified subsequently in different places in the Kombo and North Bank regions. She rose to the rank of Head teacher in the school. She went on to become the Public Relations Officer of the Women’s Bureau during 1980s.

== Political career ==
Sanneh-Bojang won the parliamentary elections in 1982 when she was a candidate of People's Progressive Party (PPP). She was appointed a Parliamentary Secretary of Education during the regime of Jawara. She was a staunch opponent of female genital mutilation (FGM) throughout her career.

She was named Member of Parliament by Jammeh under the candidacy of Alliance for Patriotic Reorientation and Construction party. She was then nominated to the National Assembly by Yahya Jammeh. She became the first elected women member of the National Assembly of The Gambia. She was voted to replace Duta Kamaso at the ECOWAS parliament on 8 June 2006. She served in Board of Directors of GAMCOTRAP from 2006 until her death in 2015. In the role, she effected a series of women empowerment initiatives in The Gambia.

== Death ==
Sanneh-Bojang died in 2015. At the time of her death, she had spent several decades in education, politics, community mobilisation and women's rights advocacy.

Her life and career have subsequently been remembered by GAMCOTRAP as an example of women's leadership, political participation and personal transformation.
