= Ava Rossana Guevara =

Ava Rossana Guevara Pinto
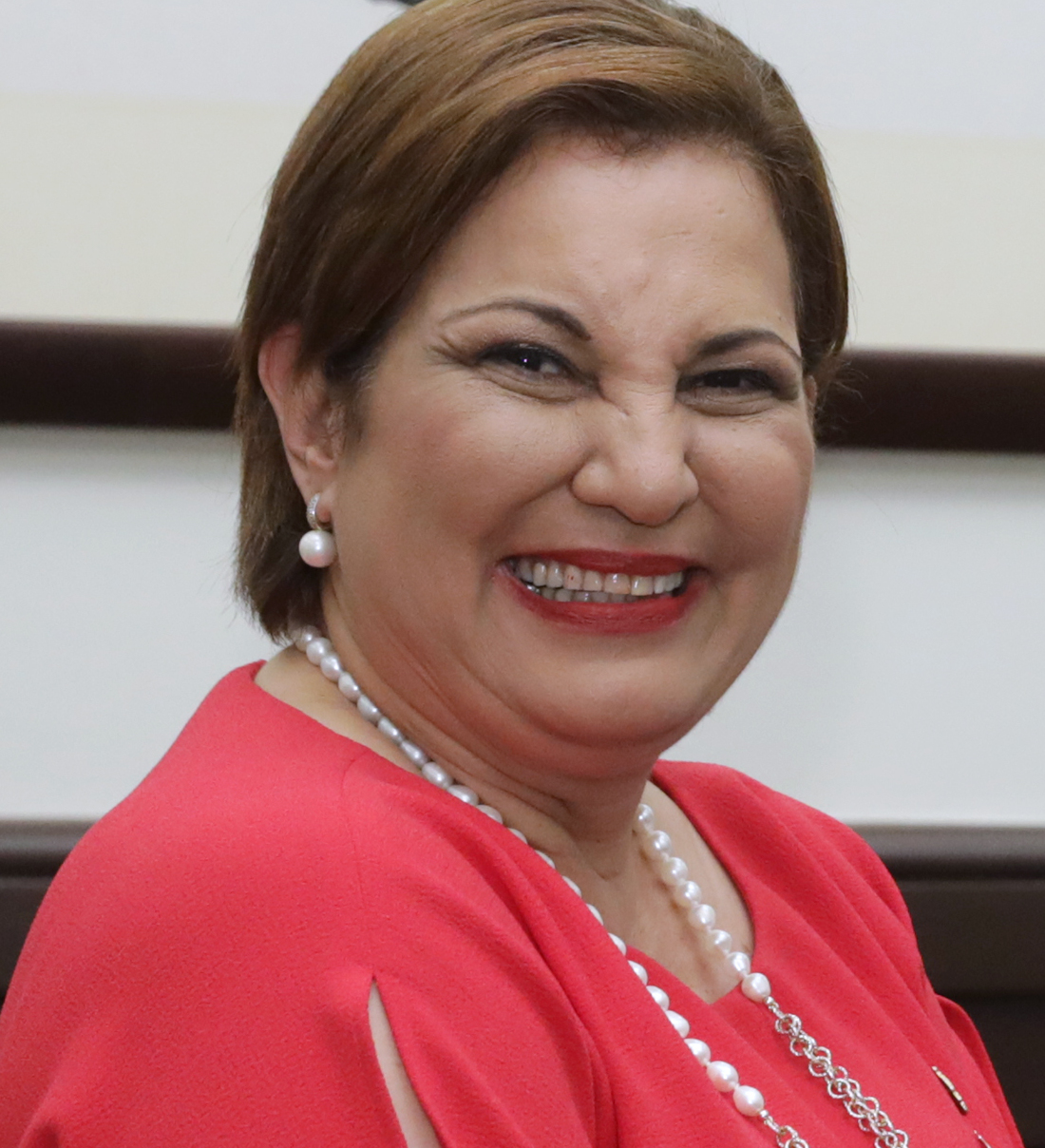
- Guevara Pinto in 2017

2nd Second Vice President of Honduras
- In office 27 January 2014 – 26 January 2018
- President: Juan Orlando Hernández
- Preceded by: Samuel Armando Reyes Rendon
- Succeeded by: Olga Margarita Alvarado Rodríguez

Personal details
- Education: National Autonomous University of Honduras

Ava Rossana Guevara Pinto is a Honduran journalist and politician who served as the 2nd Second Vice President of Honduras alongside Ricardo Álvarez Arias and Lorena Enriqueta Herrera from 2014 to 2018. Prior to her tenure as vice president she was Honduras' ambassador to Italy and Brazil and an unsuccessful vice presidential candidate in the 2009 election. She was a journalist for La Tribuna, ABC News, NBC News, and Univision

== Early life and education ==
Ava Rossana Guevara Pinto graduated from the National Autonomous University of Honduras with a degree in journalism.

== Career ==
Before graduating from college Guevara worked for La Tribuna. Guevara worked as a journalist for ABC News, NBC News, and Univision. She founded TN5 Noticiero. She was Honduras' ambassador to Italy from 2010 to 2011, and to Brazil from 2011 to 2012.

Marcelo Chimirri, manager of Honduran Telecommunications Company, filed a lawsuit in 2007 against Renato Álvarez, Melissa Amaya, Juan Carlos Cruz, Carlos Mauricio Flores, and Guevara for reporting on allegations of corruption at his company. His lawsuit was dismissed by the Supreme Court of Honduras.

Mario Canahuati selected Guevara as his running mate for the 2009 election, but they lost. Ricardo Álvarez Arias, Lorena Enriqueta Herrera, and Guevara were selected as Juan Orlando Hernández's vice-presidential running mates for the 2013 election. Their campaign won the election.

== Personal life ==
Guevara married Julio Cesar Gonzalez Cordova. She ccan speak Spanish, English, Portuguese, and Italian. UNICEF gave her the National Press Award in 1991 and 1993.

== Works cited ==
=== News ===
- "Declaratoria del TSE será publicada este viernes". El Heraldo. 7 April 2014. Archived from the original on 4 July 2025.
- "Querellan a periodistas por informar sobre denuncias de corrupción en Hondutel". Proceso Digital. 28 September 2007. Archived from the original on 4 July 2025.
- "Rossana Guevara, Lorena Herrera y Alden Rivera, designados presidenciales de "Azules Unidos"". Proceso Digital. 17 July 2012. Archived from the original on 4 July 2025.
- "Tribunal rechaza por improcedentes querella contra periodistas". Proceso Digital. 3 October 2007. Archived from the original on 4 July 2025.

=== Web ===
- "Biographical Notes" (PDF). United Nations Economic and Social Council. 23 February 2016. Archived from the original (PDF) on 19 March 2022.
- "Former Vice President of the Republic of Honduras". Florida International University. Archived from the original on 4 July 2025.
- "President Tsai meets delegation led by Honduran Second Vice President Ava Rossana Guevara Pinto". President of the Republic of China. 10 October 2017. Archived from the original on 4 July 2025.
- Baro, Madeline (20 September 2022). "A former Latin American president, vice president and U.S. undersecretary of state to serve as fall 2022 Senior Leadership Fellows". Florida International University. Archived from the original on 4 July 2025.
