= Ali Faraj Qatrani =

Libyan politician

Ali Faraj al-Qatrani

Vice Chairman of the Presidential Council of Libya
- In office 30 March 2016 – 8 April 2019 Serving with Ahmed Maiteeq, Musa Al-Koni, Fathi Al-Majbari, Abdulsalam Kajman
- President: Fayez al-Sarraj
- Preceded by: Imhemed Shaib & Ahmed Huma (Deputy Presidents of the House of Representatives)

Ali Faraj al-Qatrani is a Libyan politician. He was part of the Presidential Council of the internationally recognized Government of National Accord in Tripoli as one of its vice presidents, from 2016 to 2019.

He joined the GNA's Presidential Council at its founding in January 2016 as the representative of eastern Libya and the Libyan National Army faction of General Khalifa Haftar. He criticized the new unity government for not giving adequate representation to the eastern faction. Qatrani has been seen as the most pro-Haftar member of the Council.

In September 2017 Qatrani criticized Sarraj for his negotiations with Sudanese President Omar Al-Bashir, after General Haftar closed down the Sudanese consulate in the town of Kufra and expelled 12 diplomats, claiming Sarraj's initiative violated the Libyan Political Agreement.

In April 2019, after General Haftar declared war on the GNA and launched a military operation to take the capital Tripoli, Qatrani defected to the LNA.
