= Abdulsalam Kajman =

Libyan politician

Vice Chairman of the Presidential Council of Libya
- In office 30 March 2016 – 15 March 2021 Serving with Ahmed Maiteeq, Musa Al-Koni, Fathi Al-Majbari, Ali Faraj Qatrani
- President: Fayez al-Sarraj
- Preceded by: Imhemed Shaib & Ahmed Huma (Deputy Presidents of the House of Representatives)

Personal details
- Party: Justice and Construction Party

Abdulsalam Kajman is a Libyan politician who has served on the Presidential Council of Libya since 2016. He is one of the original five Vice Presidents of the council and is part of the Justice and Construction Party, a Muslim Brotherhood affiliate in Libya.
