= Mohammad-Ali Shahidi =

Iranian cleric and politician (1949–2020)

Seyed Mohammad-Ali Shahidi Mahallati
- سید محمد علی شهیدی محلاتی
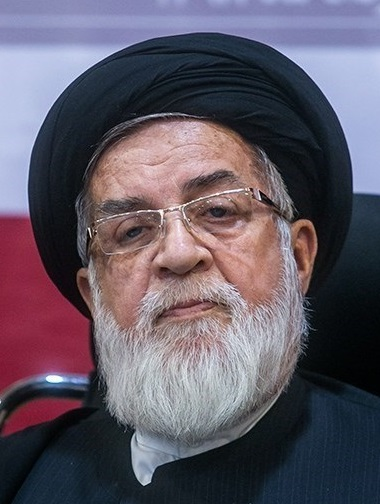

Vice President of Iran Head of Foundation of Martyrs and Veterans Affairs
- In office 15 September 2013 – 6 June 2020
- President: Hassan Rouhani
- Preceded by: Masoud Zaribafan
- Succeeded by: Saeed Ohadi

Member of the Parliament of Iran
- In office 2 May 1988 – 3 May 1992
- Constituency: Mahallat
- Majority: 21,255 (51.10%)

Personal details
- Born: 9 July 1949 Mahallat, Iran
- Died: 28 November 2020 (aged 71) Tehran, Iran

Hojjatoleslam Sayyid Mohammad Ali Shahidi Mahallati (Persian: سید محمد علی شهیدی محلاتی) was an Iranian cleric and politician who served as Director of Foundation of Martyrs and Veterans Affairs from 2013 to 2020. In 2009, former president Mahmoud Ahmadinejad, established the post of Chief Inspector, and put Shahidi as the first leader. However he was replaced on the July 20, 2011. He was brother-in-law of Ali Akbar Nategh-Nouri and Abbas Ahmad Akhoundi.

== Early life ==
Mohammad Ali Shahidi was born on July 9, 1949, in Mahallat, Iran. He began his early life, studying in the Hawza, and has earned the rank of Hojjatoleslam, and equivalent of a master's degree. It is known that he came to know Iranian President, Hassan Rouhani, from the years at the Hawza.

== Parliament ==
Shahidi Mahallati was elected as a part of the Parliament of Iran on 2 May 1988. He served for one term, with the term ending on 3 May 1992. It is interesting to say that Shahidi Mahallati was in the parliament, at the same period as Hassan Rouhani. At that term, Shahidi Mahallati's brother in law, was the head of the parliament.

== Foreign Ministry ==
During former Iranian President Mahmoud Ahmadinejad's first term, Mahallati was put as the Deputy Foreign Minister for consular affairs, by the Foreign Minister of the time, Manoucher Mottaki.
