= Presidential Council (Libya) =

Provisional body acting as the head of state of Libya

Presidential Council المجلس الرئاسي
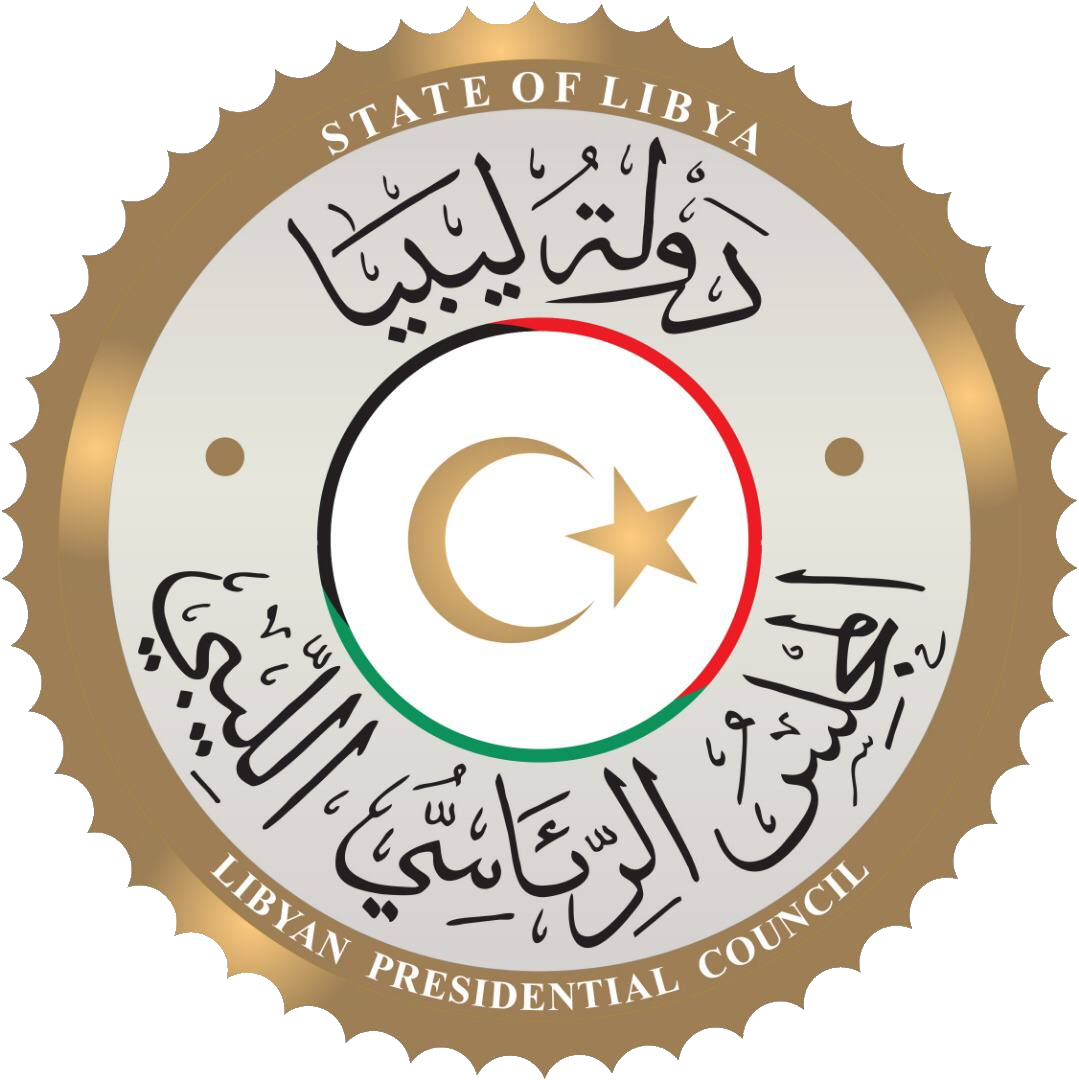
- Seal of the Libyan Presidential Council

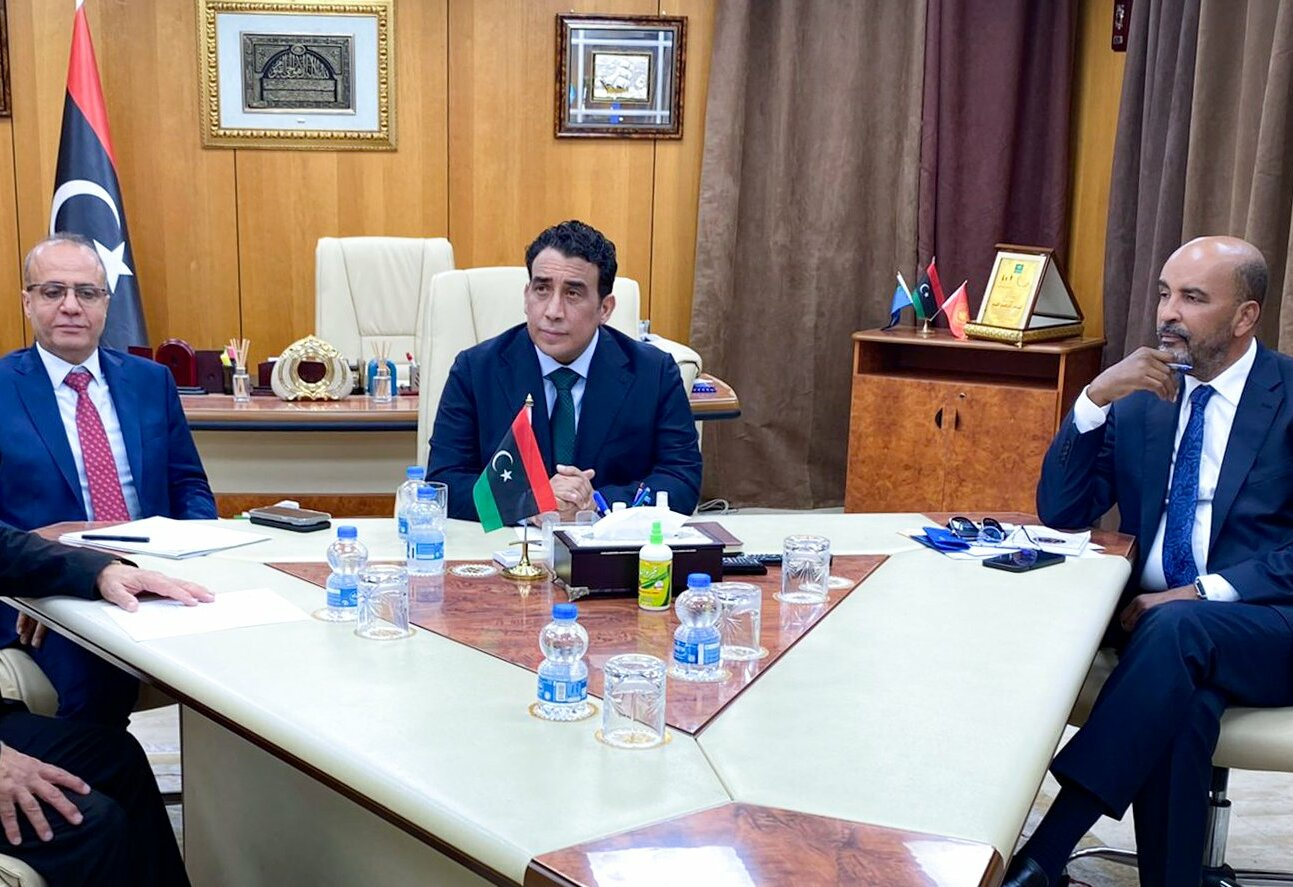
- The Presidential Council in 2022; Abdullah al-Lafi (left), Mohamed al-Menfi (centre) and Musa Al-Koni (right)

Agency overview
- Formed: 2016; 10 years ago
- Jurisdiction: Libya
- Headquarters: Al-Sikka Tripoli, Libya
- Agency executive: Mohamed al-Menfi, Chairman

The Presidential Council (Arabic: المجلس الرئاسي, al-Majlis ar-Rīʾāsiy, Tedaga: Mosko ndahaga Lîbiyaa-ã) is a body formed under the terms of the Libyan Political Agreement which was signed on 17 December 2015. The Council carries out the functions of head of state of Libya and is proposed to command the Libyan Armed Forces.

The agreement has been unanimously endorsed by the United Nations Security Council which welcomed the formation of the Presidency Council and recognized that the Government of National Accord is the sole legitimate executive government of Libya. After the House of Representatives ceased recognizing the unity government in 2022 and installed a rival government, the Presidential Council has been responsible for the Government of National Unity.

== History ==
Between 2014 and March 2021, two governments, one in Tripoli and one in Tobruk, have vied for power. The government in Tobruk was recognized by the international community prior to the formation of the Presidential Council.

=== Skhirat agreement ===
In October 2015, the UN envoy for Libya, Bernardino León, announced a proposal for the House of Representatives to share power with the rival new GNC government, under a compromise Prime minister, Fayez al-Sarraj. However, the terms of the final proposal were not acceptable to either side, and both rejected it. Nonetheless, the proposal did spark a revised proposal put together by Fayez al-Sarraj and others, which was subsequently supported by the United Nations. On 17 December 2015 members of the House of Representatives and the new General National Congress signed this revised political agreement, generally known as the "Libyan Political Agreement" or the "Skhirat Agreement". Under the terms of the agreement, a nine-member Presidency Council and a seventeen-member interim Government of National Accord would have been formed, with a view to holding new elections within two years. The House of Representatives would have continued to exist as a legislature and an advisory body, to be known as the High Council of State, would have been formed with members nominated by the New General National Congress. On 31 December 2015, Chairman of the House of Representatives, Aguila Saleh Issa declared his support for the Libyan Political Agreement.

The Chairman of the Presidential Council, Fayez al-Sarraj (former member of the Tobruk parliament), and seven of the council's other members arrived in Tripoli on 30 March 2016 at the Abu Sittah naval base. The following day, it was reported that the GNA has taken control of the prime ministerial offices and that the rival National Salvation Government appointed prime minister Khalifa al-Ghawi had fled to Misrata. On April 5, the National Salvation Government announced that it was resigning, "ceasing operations," and ceding power to the Presidential Council.

=== Government of National Unity ===
On 10 March 2021, the House of Representatives met in the central city of Sirte to formally approve the formation of a Government of National Unity led by Mohamed al-Menfi as Chairman of the Presidential Council and Abdul Hamid Dbeibeh as prime minister. On 3 March 2022, the House of Representatives ceased to recognize the Government of National Unity and the Presidential Council, and installed a rival government, the Government of National Stability, under the leadership of Prime Minister Fathi Bashagha. The decision was denounced as illegitimate by the High Council of State and condemned by the United Nations. Since then, the Presidential Council has been responsible for the Government of National Unity.

== Structure ==
The Presidential Council is led by a chairman supported by vice-chairmen representative of the historical regions of Libya. Any decision taken by the Council must be approved unanimously by the chairmen and vice-chairmen.

=== March 2021–present ===
A new Presidential Council was approved by the House of representatives on 10 March 2021, following an agreement reached at the Libyan Political Dialogue Forum under United Nations mediation:

Incumbent	Office	Since	Until	Constituency
Mohamed al-Menfi	Chairman of the Presidential Council	15 March 2021	Present	Representative for Cyrenaica
Abdullah al-Lafi	Vice-chairman	15 March 2021	Present	Representative for Tripolitania
Musa Al-Koni	Vice-chairman	15 March 2021	Present	Representative for Fezzan

=== March 2016 – March 2021 ===
Between March 2016 and March 2021, the members of the council were:

Incumbent	Office	Since	Until	Constituency
Fayez al-Sarraj	Chairman of the Presidential Council	30 March 2016	15 March 2021	GNA
Musa Al-Koni	Vice-chairman	30 March 2016	2 January 2017	Southern Libya
Fathi Al-Majbari	Vice-chairman	30 March 2016	18 July 2018	GNA
Abdulsalam Kajman	Vice-chairman	30 March 2016	15 March 2021	Muslim Brotherhood
Ahmed Maiteeq	Vice-chairman	30 March 2016	15 March 2021	Misrata and GNA
Ali Faraj Qatrani	Vice-chairman	30 March 2016	8 April 2019	Eastern Libya / LNA
Omar Al-Aswad	Minister	30 March 2016	15 March 2021	Zintan and Western Libya
Ahmad Hamza Al-Mahdi	Minister	30 March 2016	15 March 2021	
Mohammed Ammari	Minister	30 March 2016	15 March 2021	GNC

== See also ==
- Cabinet of Libya
- House of Representatives (Libya)
- High Council of State (Libya)
