= Musa Al-Koni =

Libyan politician and diplomat (born 1951)

- موسى الكوني
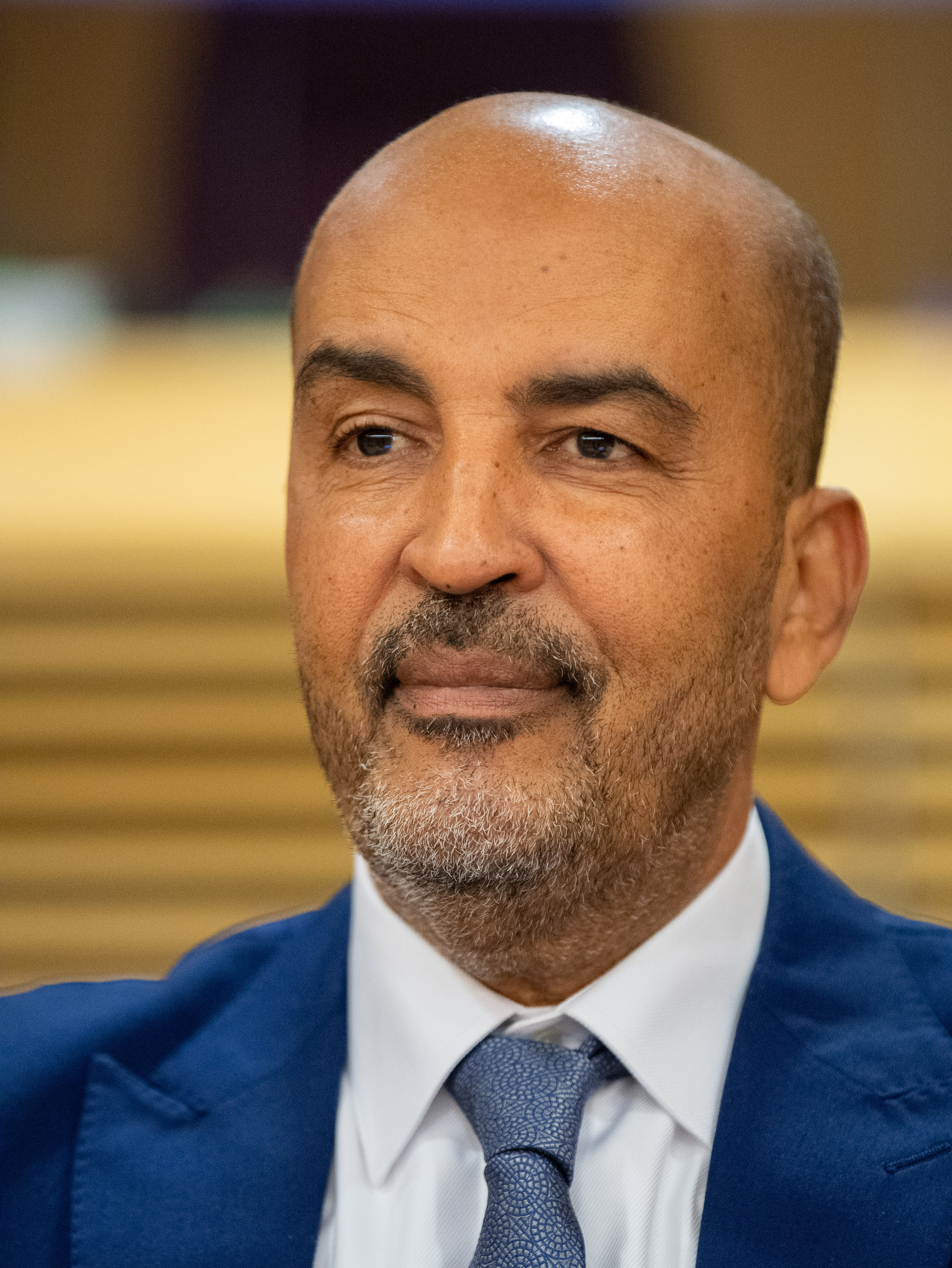
- Al-Koni in 2021

Vice Chairman of the Presidential Council of Libya
- Incumbent
- Assumed office 15 March 2021
- President: Mohamed al-Menfi
- Preceded by: Ahmed Maiteeq
- In office 30 March 2016 – 2 January 2017
- President: Fayez al-Sarraj
- Preceded by: Fathi Al-Majbari
- Succeeded by: Ahmed Maiteeq

Deputy Prime Minister of Libya
- In office 30 March 2016 – 2 January 2017 Serving with Ahmed Maiteeq, Fathi Al-Majbari

Personal details
- Born: 5 June 1951 (age 74) Sabha, Libya
- Spouse: Salma Al-Koni (m. 1990)

Musa Al-Koni (Arabic: موسى الكوني; born 5 June 1951) is a Libyan politician and diplomat. He served as the deputy prime minister of Libya's Government of National Accord from March 2016 to 2 January 2017. He represented southern Libya, where he is from. He was also one of the vice presidents of the Presidential Council until his resignation. Al-Koni resigned due to the GNA's failure to govern the country.

From 2005 until around the time of the 2011 civil war, he served as the consul general of Libya in Mali. He was accused by the Malian government of trying to recruit Tuareg mercenaries to fight for Gaddafi. His older brother, Afyat, was the leader of a Tuareg militia, which tried in vain to convince Ali Kanna to join the uprising against Gaddafi.
