= Lorena Enriqueta Herrera =

Honduran politician (born 1969)

Lorena Enriqueta Herrera Estévez
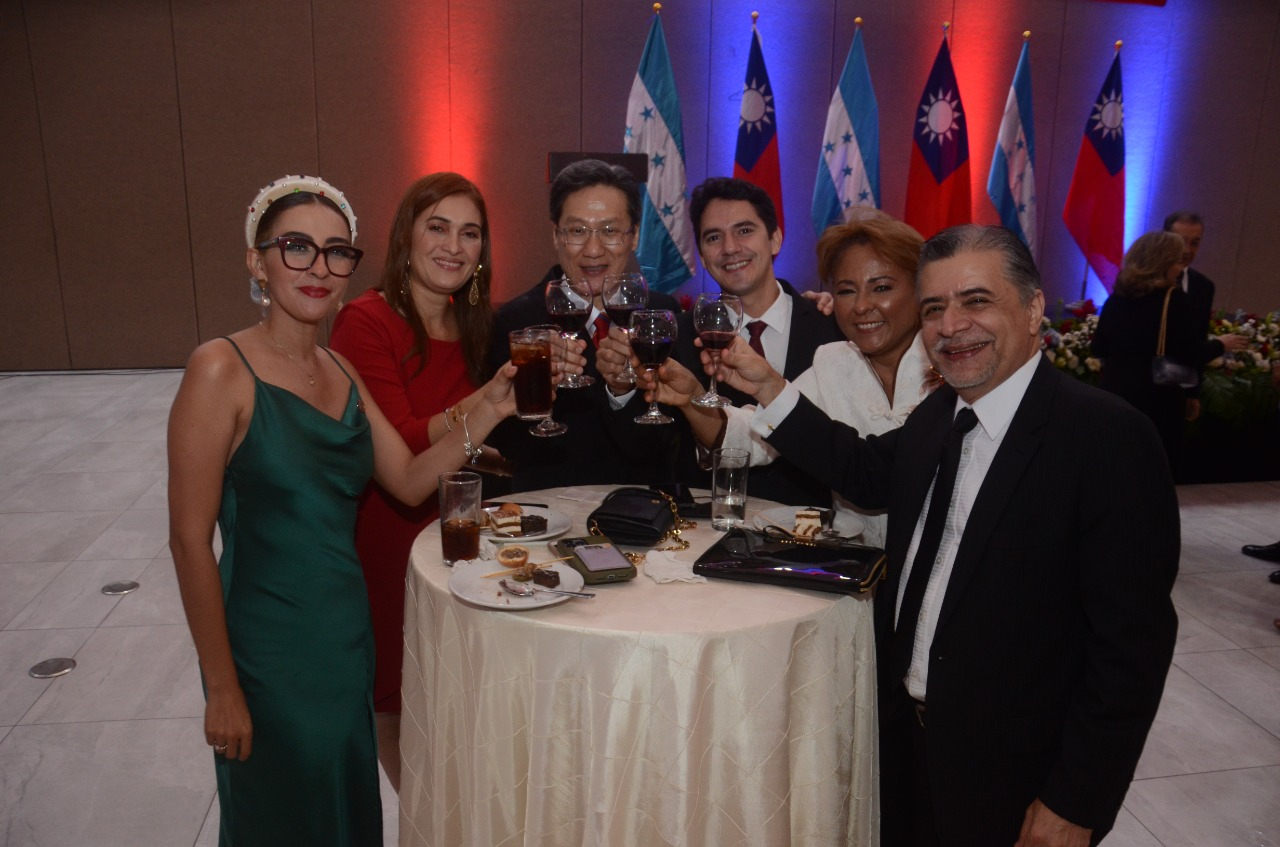
- Herrera second from right

3rd Vice President of Honduras
- In office 27 January 2014 – 26 January 2018
- President: Juan Orlando Hernández
- Preceded by: Victor Hugo Barnica
- Succeeded by: María Antonia Rivera Rosales

Personal details
- Born: 28 October 1969 (age 56)
- Party: National Party of Honduras

Lorena Enriqueta Herrera Estévez (born 28 October 1969) is a Honduran politician.

She was the third Vice President of Honduras from 2014 to 2018, during the first term of Juan Orlando Hernández.

She currently serves as deputy of the National Congress of Honduras representing the National Party of Honduras for Cortés Department.
