= Members of the National Assembly of Ecuador (2025–present) =

This article lists the members of the National Assembly of Ecuador as elected in the 2025 Ecuadorian general election.

== Composition of the National Assembly (2025-2029) ==
Those shaded in green were appointed to their seats

=== National List Assemblymembers ===
Name	Parliamentary Group	#	Electoral List	Party	Term	
Name	Parliamentary Group		Electoral List	Party	Start	End
Annabella Azín	ADN	78	ADN	ADN	14 May 2025	
Niels Olsen	ADN	127	ADN	ADN	14 May 2025	
Diana Angélica Jácome Silva	ADN	115	ADN	ADN	14 May 2025	
Esteban Torres	ADN	142	ADN	ADN	14 May 2025	
Sade Fritschi	ADN	95	ADN	ADN	14 May 2025	
Juan José Reyes Baquerizo	ADN	120	ADN	ADN	14 May 2025	
Diana Patricia Blacio Carrión	ADN	89	ADN	ADN	14 May 2025	
Raúl Arturo Chávez Núñez del Arco	BC	17	RC-RETO	RETO	14 May 2025	
Paola Cabezas	BC	11	RC-RETO	RC	14 May 2025	
Julio Vicente Patricio Xavier Lasso Mendoza	BC	35	RC-RETO	RC	14 May 2025	
Nelly Priscila Schettini Castillo	BC	64	RC-RETO	RC	Did not assume office	
Joseph Santiago Díaz Asque	No group	64	RC-RETO	Ind.	14 May 2025	29 July 2025
Annie Christina Muñoz Aroca	BC	64	RC-RETO	RC	29 July 2025	
Franklin Omar Samaniego Maigua	BC	62	RC-RETO	RC	14 May 2025	
Liliana Elizabeth Durán Aguilar	BC	24	RC-RETO	RC	14 May 2025	
Sergio Jesús Peña Veloz	No group	53	RC-RETO	Ind.	14 May 2025	
Saadin Alfredo Serrano Valladares	No group	83	PSC	PSC	14 May 2025	

=== Assemblymembers by electoral district ===
Province	Name	Parliamentary Group	#	Electoral List	Party	District	Term	
Province	Name	Parliamentary Group		Electoral List	Party	District	Start	End
Guayas	Jorge Enrique Chamba Cabanilla	ADN	101	ADN	ADN	1	14 May 2025	
Guayas	Paola Michael Jaramillo Zurita	ADN	110	ADN	ADN	1	14 May 2025	
Guayas	Isaac Vladimir Solano Calle	ADN	146	ADN	ADN	1	14 May 2025	
Guayas	Ricardo Patiño	BC	51	RC	RC	1	14 May 2025	
Guayas	Yela Duarte Ana Belén	BC	72	RC	RC	1	14 May 2025	
Guayas	Cuero Medina Roberto Emilio	BC	21	RC	RC	1	14 May 2025	
Guayas	Desintonio Malave Victoria Tatiana	BC	23	RC	RC	2	14 May 2025	
Guayas	Molina Saldaña Juan Pablo	BC	44	RC	RC	2	14 May 2025	
Guayas	Jácome Benítez Milena Cristina	BC	34	RC	RC	2	14 May 2025	
Guayas	Guschmer Tamariz Marcelo Andrés	ADN	117	ADN	ADN	2	14 May 2025	
Guayas	Rizzo Alvear Janina Jadira	ADN	151	ADN	ADN	2	14 May 2025	
Guayas	Moran Galarza Alex	ADN	130	ADN	ADN	2	14 May 2025	
Guayas	Jaramillo Zurita Lucía Lizbeth	ADN	111	ADN	ADN	3	14 May 2025	
Guayas	Álvarez Zambrano Ferdinan Arturo	ADN	79	ADN	ADN	3	14 May 2025	
Guayas	Quintana Tapia Naila Victoria	ADN	123	ADN	ADN	3	14 May 2025	
Guayas	Butiñá Martínez Nuria Susana	BC	10	RC	RC	3	14 May 2025	
Guayas	Vanegas Cortazar Alejandro Lorenzo	BC	69	RC	RC	3	14 May 2025	
Guayas	Figueroa Aguilar Sandra Elizabeth	BC	26	RC	RC	3	14 May 2025	
Guayas	Raffo Guevara Ana María	BC	60	RC	RC	4	14 May 2025	
Guayas	Fricson George	BC	27	RC	RC	4	14 May 2025	
Guayas	Romero Ponguillo Josefina Germania	BC	55	RC	RC	4	14 May 2025	
Guayas	Vargas Quijano Carlos Enrique	No group	70	RC	Ind.	4	14 May 2025	
Guayas	Cevallos Macías Francisco Andrés	ADN	102	ADN	ADN	4	14 May 2025	
Guayas	Rosado Sánchez Marjorie Lorena	ADN	149	ADN	ADN	4	14 May 2025	
Manabí	Mendoza Andrade Guido Andrés	BC	39	RC	RC	1	14 May 2025	
Manabí	Vélez Vélez Bertha Betsabe	BC	71	RC	RC	1	14 May 2025	
Manabí	Barreto Zambrano Lenin Daniel	BC	8	RC	RC	1	14 May 2025	
Manabí	Mendoza Ibarra María Besibell	ADN	133	ADN	ADN	1	14 May 2025	
Manabí	Zambrano Vera Mario Amado	ADN	137	ADN	ADN	1	14 May 2025	
Manabí	Cedeño Rivadeneira Fernando Enrique	BC	15	RC-Sí Podemos	RC	2	14 May 2025	
Manabí	Molina Menéndez María Gabriela	BC	40	RC-Sí Podemos	RC	2	14 May 2025	
Manabí	Estrada Medranda Jaime David	BC	25	RC-Sí Podemos	Sí Podemos	2	14 May 2025	
Manabí	Centeno Arteaga Valentina	ADN	103	ADN	ADN	2	14 May 2025	
Manabí	Franco Hanze Diego Martín	ADN	96	ADN	ADN	2	14 May 2025	
Pichincha	Alarcón Bueno Inés Margarita	ADN	80	ADN	ADN	Centro-Norte	14 May 2025	
Pichincha	Castillo Maldonado Andrés Felipe	ADN	85	ADN	ADN	Centro-Norte	14 May 2025	
Pichincha	Molina Coro María del Cisne	ADN	131	ADN	ADN	Centro-Norte	14 May 2025	
Pichincha	Rodríguez Chávez Héctor Eduardo	BC	54	RC	RC	Centro-Norte	14 May 2025	
Pichincha	Zúñiga Rocha Ledy Andrea	BC	73	RC	RC	Centro-Norte	14 May 2025	
Pichincha	Recalde Álava Eckenner Reader	ADN	121	ADN	ADN	Centro-Sur	14 May 2025	
Pichincha	Morillo Solórzano Lourdes Nataly	ADN	129	ADN	ADN	Centro-Sur	14 May 2025	20 November 2025
Pichincha	Garcia Velasquez Luigi Edu	ADN	129	ADN	ADN	Centro-Sur	20 November 2025	
Pichincha	Serrano Molina Dominique Elian	ADN	147	ADN	ADN	Centro-Sur	14 May 2025	
Pichincha	Hernández Yunda Christian Alberto	BC	31	RC	RC	Centro-Sur	14 May 2025	
Pichincha	Urresta Guzmán Jhajaira Estefanía	No group	66	RC	Ind.	Centro-Sur	14 May 2025	
Pichincha	Farinango Delgado Nathaly Estefanía	ADN	97	ADN	ADN	Quito Rural	14 May 2025	
Pichincha	Jácome Mejía Luis Fernando	ADN	116	ADN	ADN	Quito Rural	14 May 2025	
Pichincha	Vega Segura Elizabeth Juliette	ADN	140	ADN	ADN	Quito Rural	14 May 2025	
Pichincha	Noriega Donoso Jahiren Elizabeth	BC	45	RC	RC	Quito Rural	14 May 2025	
Pichincha	Chávez Zavala Patricio Alberto	BC	18	RC	RC	Quito Rural	14 May 2025	
Pichincha	Alemán Mármol Mónica Rocío	BC	3	RC	RC	Resto de Pichincha	14 May 2025	
Pichincha	Molina Onofa Luis Fernando	BC	43	RC	RC	Resto de Pichincha	14 May 2025	
Pichincha	Zapata Rojas Hernán Patricio	ADN	136	ADN	ADN	Resto de Pichincha	14 May 2025	
Pichincha	Farinango Quilumbaquín Dina Maribel	MUPP	41	MUPP	MUPP	Resto de Pichincha	14 May 2025	

=== Provincial assembly members ===
Province	DELETe column	Names	Parliamentary Group	#	Electoral List	Party	Term	
Province	DELETe column	Names	Parliamentary Group	#	Electoral List	Party	Start	End
Azuay		Castro Piedra Adrián Ernesto	ADN	84	ADN	ADN	14 May 2025	
Azuay		León Cueva Camila	ADN	107	ADN	ADN	14 May 2025	
Azuay		Becerra Contreras Anthony Sebastián	ADN	90	ADN	ADN	14 May 2025	
Azuay		Ordóñez Quezada Roque Martín	BC	47	RC	RC	14 May 2025	
Azuay		Méndez Rojas Fernanda Mabel	BC	59	RC	RC	14 May 2025	
Azuay		Machado Clavijo Gerardo Eugenio	BC	37	RC	RC	14 May 2025	
Bolívar		Bósquez Villena Henry Saúl	ADN	87	ADN	ADN	14 May 2025	
Bolívar		Yumbay Yallico Mariana	MUPP	75	MUPP	MUPP	14 May 2025	
Bolívar		Pazmiño Arregui Mireya Katerine	BC	52	RC	RC	14 May 2025	
Cañar		Sanmartín Parra Fabiola Maribel	ADN	148	ADN	ADN	14 May 2025	
Cañar		Luna Arévalo Blasco Remigio	BC	36	RC-RETO	RC	14 May 2025	
Cañar		Choro Duchi Segundo Manuel	No group	28	MUPP	Ind.	14 May 2025	
Carchi		Pozo Moreta Brígida Lucía	ADN	124	ADN	ADN	14 May 2025	
Carchi		Vallejo Ayala José Luis	BC	68	RC-Lidera	RC	14 May 2025	
Carchi		Benavides Fuentes Cristian	No group	76	UP-PID-PSE	UP	14 May 2025	
Chimborazo		Mishel Mancheno	ADN	106	ADN	ADN	14 May 2025	
Chimborazo		Gallardo Ruiz Keevin Fernando	ADN	94	ADN	ADN	14 May 2025	
Chimborazo		Nuñez Ramos Silvia Patricia	BC	46	RC	RC	14 May 2025	
Chimborazo		Tiupul Urquizo Carmen Yolanda	No group	58	MUPP; Merecemos Más	Ind.	14 May 2025	
Cotopaxi		Olmedo Arias Marco Patricio	ADN	128	ADN	ADN	14 May 2025	
Cotopaxi		Cueva Tarco Camila Anahi	ADN	100	ADN	ADN	14 May 2025	
Cotopaxi		Toapanta Jami Alex Fabricio	MUPP	74	MUPP	MUPP	14 May 2025	
Cotopaxi		Herrera Gómez Ana Cecilia	BC	32	RC-RETO	RC	14 May 2025	
El Oro		Salas Barriga Diego Enrique	BC	61	RC	RC	14 May 2025	
El Oro		Cabrera Chacón Sara Noemi	BC	12	RC	RC	14 May 2025	
El Oro		Blacio Castillo Manuel de Jesús	ADN	88	ADN	ADN	14 May 2025	
El Oro		Pacheco Machuca Katherine Alexandra	ADN	126	ADN	ADN	14 May 2025	
El Oro		Ordóñez Bravo Steven Leonardo	ADN	119	Sur Unido Regional	SUR	14 May 2025	
Esmeraldas		Bustos Salazar Janeth Katherine	BC	9	RC	RC	14 May 2025	
Esmeraldas		Casanova Montesino Lizardo Manuel	BC	14	RC	RC	14 May 2025	
Esmeraldas		Polanco Lara John Edison	ADN	125	ADN	ADN	14 May 2025	
Esmeraldas		Dueñas Palma Gema Karolina	ADN	99	ADN	ADN	14 May 2025	
Esmeraldas		Celleri Gómez Samuel Elías	ADN	77	PSC	PSC	14 May 2025	
Galápagos		Aguas Flores Milton Javier	ADN	81	ADN	ADN	14 May 2025	
Galápagos		Arias Montalvo Jesús David	No group	5	RC-RETO	Ind.	14 May 2025	
Imbabura		Pamela Aguirre	BC	1	RC	RC	14 May 2025	
Imbabura		de la Torre de la Torre Fernando	BC	22	RC	RC	14 May 2025	
Imbabura		Jaramillo Martínez Roberto Fernando	ADN	113	ADN	ADN	14 May 2025	
Imbabura		Jurado Moreno Pablo Aníbal	ADN	135	MC25	MC25	14 May 2025	
Loja		Guevara Benavidez Jorge Luis	ADN	93	ADN	ADN	14 May 2025	
Loja		Jaramillo Rodríguez Anelisse Josebeth	ADN	112	ADN	ADN	14 May 2025	
Loja		Iñiguez Gallardo María Verónica	BC	33	RC	RC	14 May 2025	
Loja		González Alvear Juan Andrés	BC	29	RC	RC	14 May 2025	
Los Ríos		Alvarado Espinel Marcos Humberto	BC	4	RC	RC	14 May 2025	
Los Ríos		Salazar Hidalgo Mónica de Jesús	No group	118	RC	Ind.	14 May 2025	
Los Ríos		González Valero Ronal Eduardo	BC	30	RC	RC	14 May 2025	
Los Ríos		Mendoza Palma Eduardo Erwin	ADN	132	ADN	ADN	14 May 2025	
Los Ríos		Torres Cadena Rosa Alegría	ADN	143	ADN	ADN	14 May 2025	
Los Ríos		Terán Barragán Johnny Enrique	No group	92	PSC	PSC	14 May 2025	
Morona Santiago		Nantipia Chumpi José Fernando	No group	57	MUPP	Ind.	14 May 2025	
Morona Santiago		Saant Juank Nanki Lauro	BC	56	RC-RETO	RC	14 May 2025	
Morona Santiago		Jarrín Rivadeneira Edwin Estuardo	ADN	105	PSP-PSC-MDS	PSP	14 May 2025	
Napo		Tapia Vallejo Ana Belén	ADN	144	ADN	ADN	14 May 2025	
Napo		Cerda Tapuy Jorge Edmundo	No group	16	MUPP	Ind.	14 May 2025	
Orellana		Sánchez Sarango Mariuxi Cleopatra	BC	63	RC	RC	14 May 2025	25 August 2025
Orellana		Guzmán Cruz Juan Kleiner	BC	63	RC	RC	25 August 2025	
Orellana		Báez Mera Guillermo Vicente	BC	7	RC	RC	14 May 2025	
Orellana		Vega Morillo Nuvia Rocío	ADN	141	ADN	ADN	14 May 2025	
Pastaza		Acuña Vaca María Cristina	ADN	82	ADN-Semilla	Semilla	14 May 2025	
Pastaza		Nango Cuji José Luis	No group	42	MUPP	Ind.	14 May 2025	
Santa Elena		Palacios Alejandro César Gustavo	BC	48	RC	RC	14 May 2025	
Santa Elena		Parrales Yagual Arisdely Paola	BC	50	RC	RC	14 May 2025	
Santa Elena		Tamayo Triviño Jorge Fabricio	ADN	145	ADN	ADN	14 May 2025	
Santa Elena		Vera Palacios Otto Santiago	No group	104	PSC-Únete	Únete	14 May 2025	
Santo Domingo de los Tsáchilas		Viviana Veloz	BC	2	RC	RC	14 May 2025	
Santo Domingo de los Tsáchilas		Campos Tobar Hermel Andrés	BC	13	RC	RC	14 May 2025	
Santo Domingo de los Tsáchilas		Bayas Uriarte Jadira del Rosario	ADN	91	ADN	ADN	14 May 2025	
Santo Domingo de los Tsáchilas		Jaramillo Gómez Christopher Manuel	ADN	114	ADN	ADN	14 May 2025	
Sucumbíos		Córdova Díaz Comps Pascacio	BC	19	RC	RC	14 May 2025	
Sucumbíos		Villacres Salazar Carlos Steve	ADN	139	ADN	ADN	14 May 2025	
Sucumbíos		Gonzaga Salazar Juan Marco	No group	134	Acuerdo Ciudadano	AC	14 May 2025	
Tungurahua		Villacreses Herrera María Paula	ADN	138	ADN	ADN	14 May 2025	
Tungurahua		Lara Pérez Lenin Alejandro	ADN	109	ADN	ADN	14 May 2025	
Tungurahua		Escobar Galarza Doménica Carolina		98	ADN	ADN	14 May 2025	
Tungurahua		Tuala Muntza Segundo Eustaquio	BC	65	RC	RC	14 May 2025	
Tungurahua		Baltazar Yucailla Rosa Cecilia	No group	6	MUPP	Ind.	14 May 2025	
Zamora Chinchipe		Rogel Esperanza del Cisne	ADN	150	ADN	ADN	14 May 2025	
Zamora Chinchipe		Valladarez González Héctor Guillermo	BC	67	RC	RC	14 May 2025	

=== Assemblymembers of the exterior ===
Ecuadorians residing outside the country receive representation in the National Assembly.

delete column	Names	Parliamentary Group	#	Electoral List	Party	Constituency	Tenure	
delete column	Names	Parliamentary Group		Electoral List	Party	Constituency	Start	End
	Ramírez Chalen Graciela Janeth	ADN	122	ADN	ADN	Asia, Europe, and Oceania	14 May 2025	
	Mateus Acosta Gustavo Enrique	BC	38	RC-RETO	RC	Asia, Europe, and Oceania	14 May 2025	
	Lavayen Tamayo Johnny Alfredo	ADN	108	ADN	ADN	Canada and the United States	14 May 2025	
	Palacios Zambrano Mónica Estefanía	BC	49	RC-RETO	RC	Canada and the United States	14 May 2025	
	Carrasco Yépez María del Carmen	ADN	86	ADN	ADN	Latin America, the Caribbean, and Africa	14 May 2025	19 May 2025
	Ordóñez Fuentes Mauricio Javier	ADN	86	ADN	ADN	Latin America, the Caribbean, and Africa	19 May 2025	
	Correa González Eliana Katherine	BC	20	RC-RETO	RC	Latin America, the Caribbean, and Africa	14 May 2025	

== Resignations ==
These assembly members resigned from the legislature.

Name	Party	Date of resignation	Motive	Replacement	Party	Ref.
Schettini Castillo Nelly Priscila	RC	1 May 2025	Loss of political rights	Díaz Asque Joseph Santiago	RC	
Carrasco Yepez María del Carmen	ADN	19 May 2025		Ordóñez Fuentes Mauricio Javier	ADN	
Díaz Asque Joseph Santiago	Ind.	29 July 2025	Suspension of rights	Muñoz Aroca Annie Christina	RC	
Sánchez Sarango Mariuxi Cleopatra	RC	25 August 2025	Death	Guzmán Cruz Juan Kleiner	RC	
Morillo Solórzano Lourdes Nataly	ADN	20 November 2025	Appointed minister in government	Garcia Velasquez Luigi Edu	ADN	

== Party changes ==
The following are those who changed parties after being elected.

Name	Original Affiliations		Date of change	New Affiliations		Causa	Ref.
Name	Parliamentary Group	Party	Date of change	Parliamentary Group	Party	Causa	Ref.
Peña Veloz Sergio Jesús	BC	RC	29 May 2025	No group	Ind.	Expelled	
Arias Montalvo Jesús David	BC	RC	10 June 2025	No group	Ind.	Expelled	
Díaz Asque Joseph Santiago	BC	RC	8 July 2025	No group	Ind.	Expelled	
Urresta Guzmán Jhajaira Estefanía	BC	RC	10 July 2025	No group	Ind.	Personal decision	
Vargas Quijano Carlos Enrique	BC	RC	15 July 2025	No group	Ind.	Expelled	
Baltazar Yucailla Rosa Cecilia	No group	MUPP	16 September 2025	No group	Ind.	Expelled	
Nango Cuji José Luis	No group	MUPP	16 September 2025	No group	Ind.	Expelled	
Choro Duchi Segundo Manuel	No group	MUPP	16 September 2025	No group	Ind.	Expelled	
Tiupul Urquizo Carmen Yolanda	No group	MUPP	16 September 2025	No group	Ind.	Expelled	
Nantipia Chumpi José Fernando	No group	MUPP	16 September 2025	No group	Ind.	Expelled	
