= Diana Jácome =

Ecuadorian politician

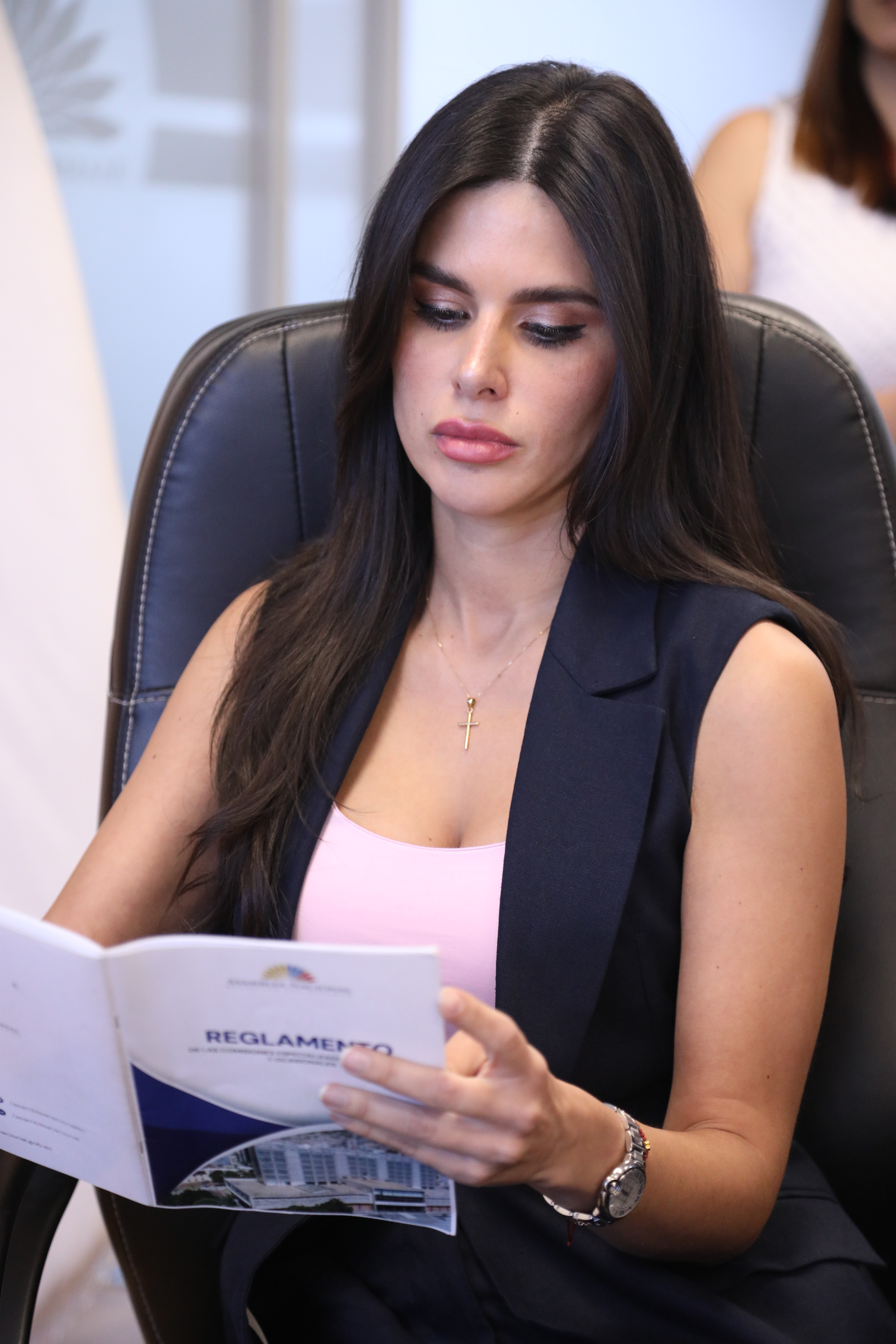
- in 2025
- Born: c.1983 Santo Domingo de los Tsáchilas Province
- Occupations: lawyer and politician
- Known for: member of the National Assembly
- Political party: National Democratic Action (ADN)

Diana Angélica Jácome Silva (born c.1983) is an Ecuadorian lawyer, television presenter and politician. She was a vice presidential candidate who became an adviser at 23 years old to President Noboa. She was elected to the National Assembly in 2025 and chairs the National Assembly's Commission on Transparency, Citizen Participation and Social Control.

== Life ==
Jácome was born in Santo Domingo de los Tsáchilas Province. She went to school there and she was a radio announcer before she became a television presenter and a beauty contestant to be the "Queen of Santo Domingo" aged 23.

In 2023, she was chosen as the running mate of Jan Topic for the presidential election

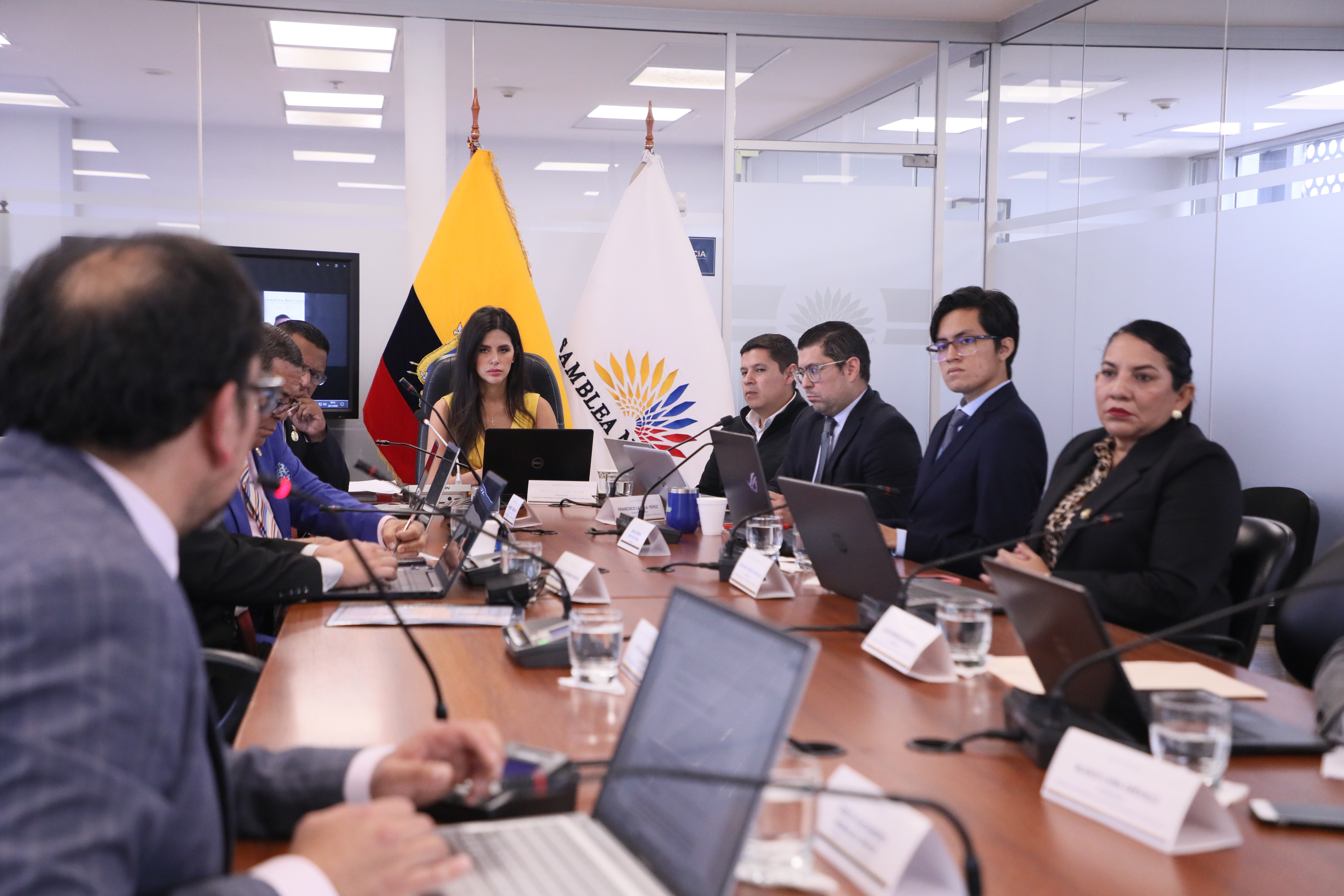
chairing the Commission on Transparency, Citizen Participation and Social Control in 2025

She was chosen by Daniel Noboa as one of his advisers and she became a member of the National Assembly in 2025 for National Democratic Action (ADN). She was on the party's national list which included Annabella Azin, Sade Fritschi and Diana Blacio in 2025.

She chairs the National Assembly's Commission on Transparency, Citizen Participation and Social Control. Her vice-president is Edmundo Cerda Tapuy and the commission's members include Josefina Romero Ponguillo and Dominique Serrano Molina.
