= Paola Cabezas =

Ecuadorian politician (born 1978)

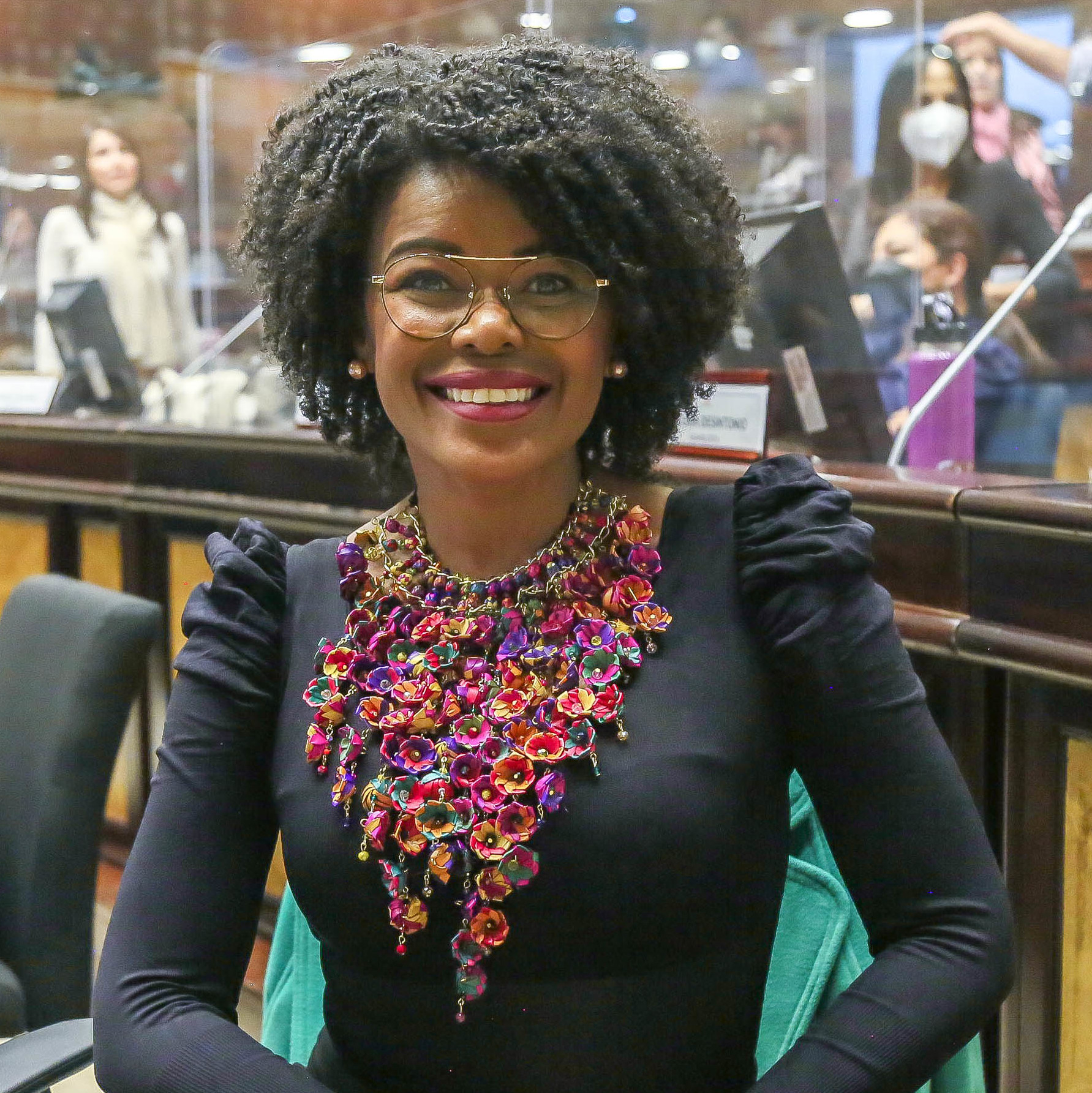
- Cabezas in March 2022

Governor of Esmeraldas Province
- In office 10 October 2013 – 19 August 2016
- Appointed by: Rafael Correa
- Preceded by: Pablo Lemos
- Succeeded by: Gabriel Rivera López

Member of the National Assembly
- Incumbent
- Assumed office 14 May 2021

Personal details
- Born: 4 September 1978 (age 48) Esmeraldas, Ecuador
- Party: Citizen Revolution Movement (since 2018)
- Other political affiliations: Union for Hope; PAIS Alliance (until 2018)
- Education: University of Guayaquil; Universidad del Salvador
- Occupation: Radio and television presenter, politician
- Website: https://paolacabezascastillo.com/

Janeth Paola Cabezas Castillo (born 4 September 1978) is an Ecuadorian politician and former television presenter. She was the Governor of Esmeraldas Province from 2013 to 2016 and is a current member of Ecuador's National Assembly for the Citizen Revolution Movement (RC). Cabezas was elected leader of the largest political coalition in the 2021 National Assembly, the Union for Hope (UNES).

== Early life and education ==
Cabezas was born in Esmeraldas on 4 September 1978 and grew up in Quinindé. She started her radio career when she was fifteen. She graduated from the University of Guayaquil in 2008 and then studied Political Marketing at the Universidad del Salvador in Buenos Aires, Argentina, where she graduated with a master's degree.

== Professional career ==
Cabezas worked as a radio presenter for a variety of radio stations of Esmeraldas, Quito and Guayaquil including Radio Disney of Guayaquil. In 2007 she was seen on TV as the presenter of RTS's morning TV program. This ceased in 2009 when she was the first Afro-Ecuadorian news anchor for Ecuador TV. In 2010, she entered public administration, where she was employed in several positions until 2013.

== Political career ==
In 2013, Cabezas was appointed as the Governor of the northern province of Esmeraldas by Ecuador's then President Rafael Correa. She was succeeded as Governor in 2016 by the President's next appointee who was Gabriel Rivera López.

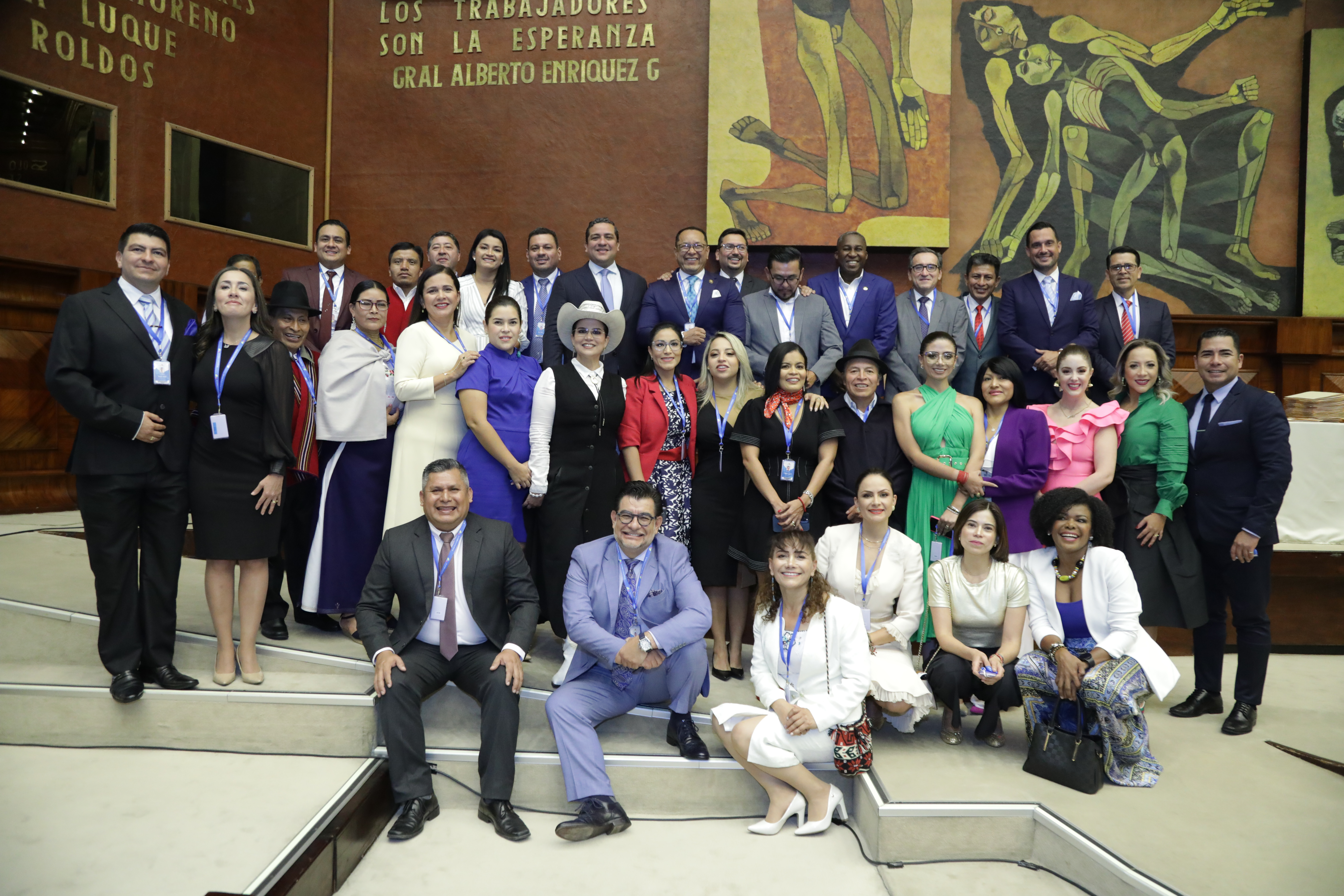
The 2023 National Assembly. She is sitting at bottom right

After her resignation as Governor, she put pressure on the President to ensure that she was appointed to the committee overseeing the recovery from the 2016 Ecuador earthquake. Her region was one of the two most affected, and she became the only representative on the committee from Esmeraldas province in October 2016. In the parliamentary elections of 2017, she was elected a substitute MP for Augusto Espinosa in the National Assembly. In the parliamentary elections of 2021, she was elected as an MP through the political alliance Union for Hope (UNES). In May 2021 and after Sofía Espín's resignation from this position, Cabezas was elected as the new leader of this significant political coalition in the National Assembly, the UNES.

In 2022 Cabezas was the opposition leader in the National Assembly where she claimed that the President's introduction of special emergency measures to control dissent in the three provinces of Cotopaxi, Imbabura and Pichincha had "serious irregularities". The measures introduced in June included restricting access to the internet and the "lethal use of force". Debates were held to try and repeal the President's decree. The protests had started with indigenous people protesting about the economic climate but it soon attracted students and workers in support.

The President of Ecuador Guillermo Lasso brought in the constitution clause number 148 known as Mutual death in May 2023 when he knew that he was about to be impeached. This required all of the National Assembly members to stand for re-election. Herrara and 67 others stood for re-election and she was one of the 43 re-elected later that year. The others included Ana Herrera, Sofía Sánchez, Gissella Molina and Patricia Mendoza.

In September 2024 her rival Inés Alarcón of the ruling party was at threat of being suspended from the assembly. Cabezas alleged that Alarcón had brought the assembly into disrepute. Cabezas said that Alarcon had referred to the impeachment of Attorney-General Diana Salazar as a "narco-trial". In reply, Alarcón proposed that this was just an attempt by Cabezas to avoid other issues that involved former leaders from her party. The accusation would be judged by the Assembly's Legislative Administration Council.

She was reelected to the National Assembly in 2025. She was on the RETO Movement party's national list which included Liliana Durán and Priscila Schettini in 2025. Viviana Veloz was chosen to lead the National Assembly's Commission for the Comprehensive Protection of Girls, Boys and Adolescents. The commission's members included Cabezas, Monica Palacios, Dina Farinango, Raúl Arturo Chávez Nuñez del Arco and Mireya Pazmino.

== Personal life ==
In April 2022, Andrés Castillo, candidate for mayor of Quito, published a tweet containing a doctored image of Cabezas. Cabezas made an accusation that the tweet was offensive. The offending tweet also contained a racist aspect. The tweet was condemned by the political party RC, of which Cabezas is a member. In Ecuador, it is an offence to discriminate based on gender; fines can be imposed on politicians and they can be removed from office.

Cabezas formerly straightened her afro-textured hair or wore a wig. However, when her niece asked in 2018 if she could get rid of her "ugly", unstraightened hair and have hair like Cabezas's, Cabezas decided from then on to wear her hair unstraightened.

Cabezas has six younger siblings.
