= Priscila Schettini =

Ecuadorian politician

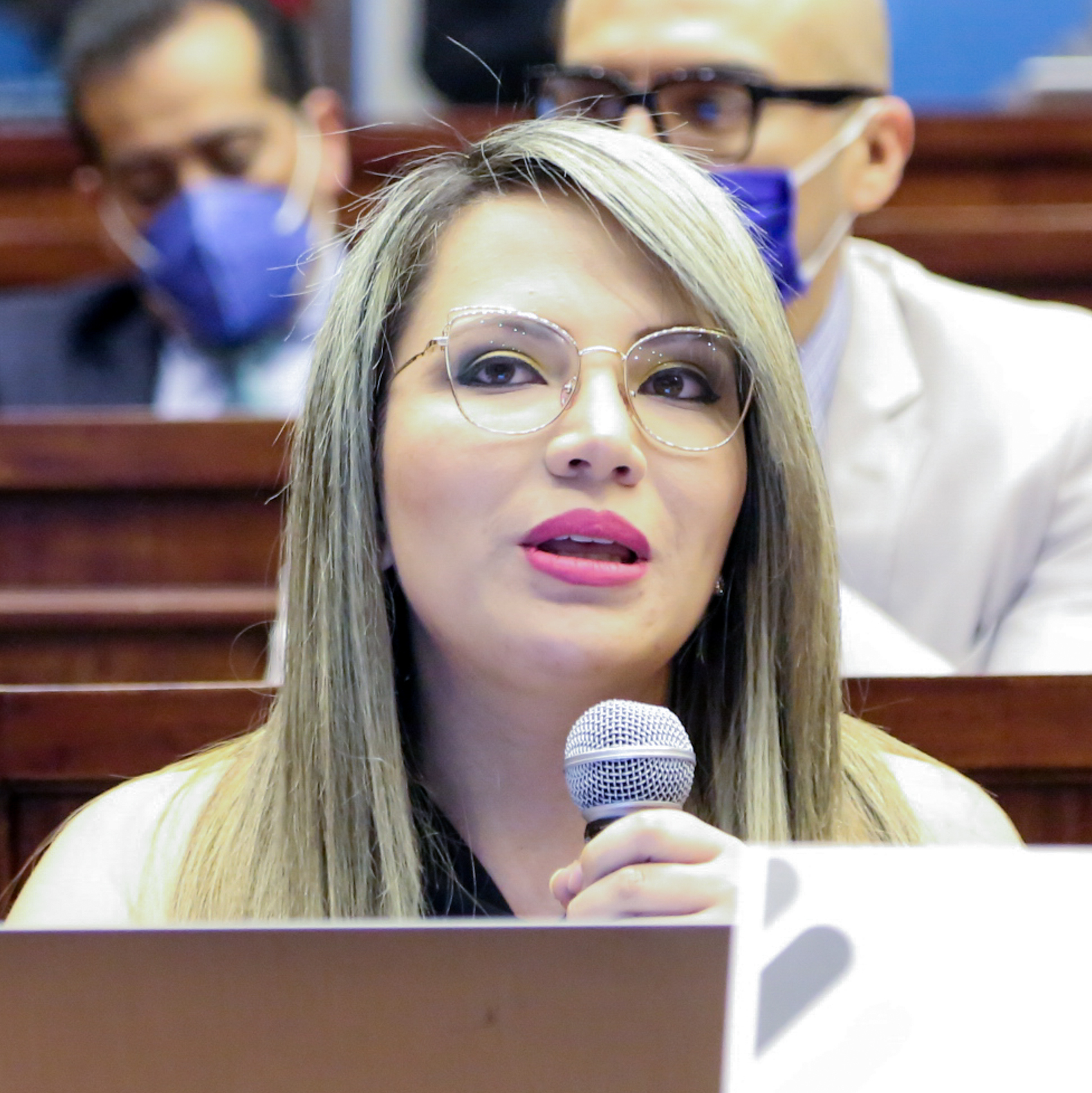
- during her husband's impeachment in 2021
- Occupation: politician
- Known for: elected politician prevented from attending the National Assembly
- Political party: Citizen Revolution Movement
- Spouse: Freddie Carrion

Priscila Schettini is an Ecuadorian politician barred from taking her National Assembly seat because of comments she made about the attorney general Diana Salazar.

== Life ==
Schettini was the wife of the ombudsman Freddy Carrión. Her husband was sentenced to three years of imprisonment because of a complaint about his behaviour by the partner of the former health minister Mauro Falconí. The judge Diana Salazar had asked for seven years but the other judges suggested three.

Schettini and Angélica Porras were sanctioned by the Electoral Disputes Tribunal following a complaint by the attorney general Diana Salazar. Salazar complained about comments made that were racist and gender based. The two women accused were punished by not being allowed their political rights for three years. Schettini was not able to take her place in the National Assembly. As a leading member of the Citizen Revolution Movement, Schettini was on the RETO Movement party's national list which included Paola Cabezas and Liliana Durán in 2025. Schettini's place at the assembly would be taken by Santiago Díaz Asque who was her alternate.

The ten-month-long dispute and the resulting case was referred to the full body of the Electoral Disputes Tribunal in mid May 2025.
