= Inés Alarcón =

Ecuadorian politician

Ines Alarcon
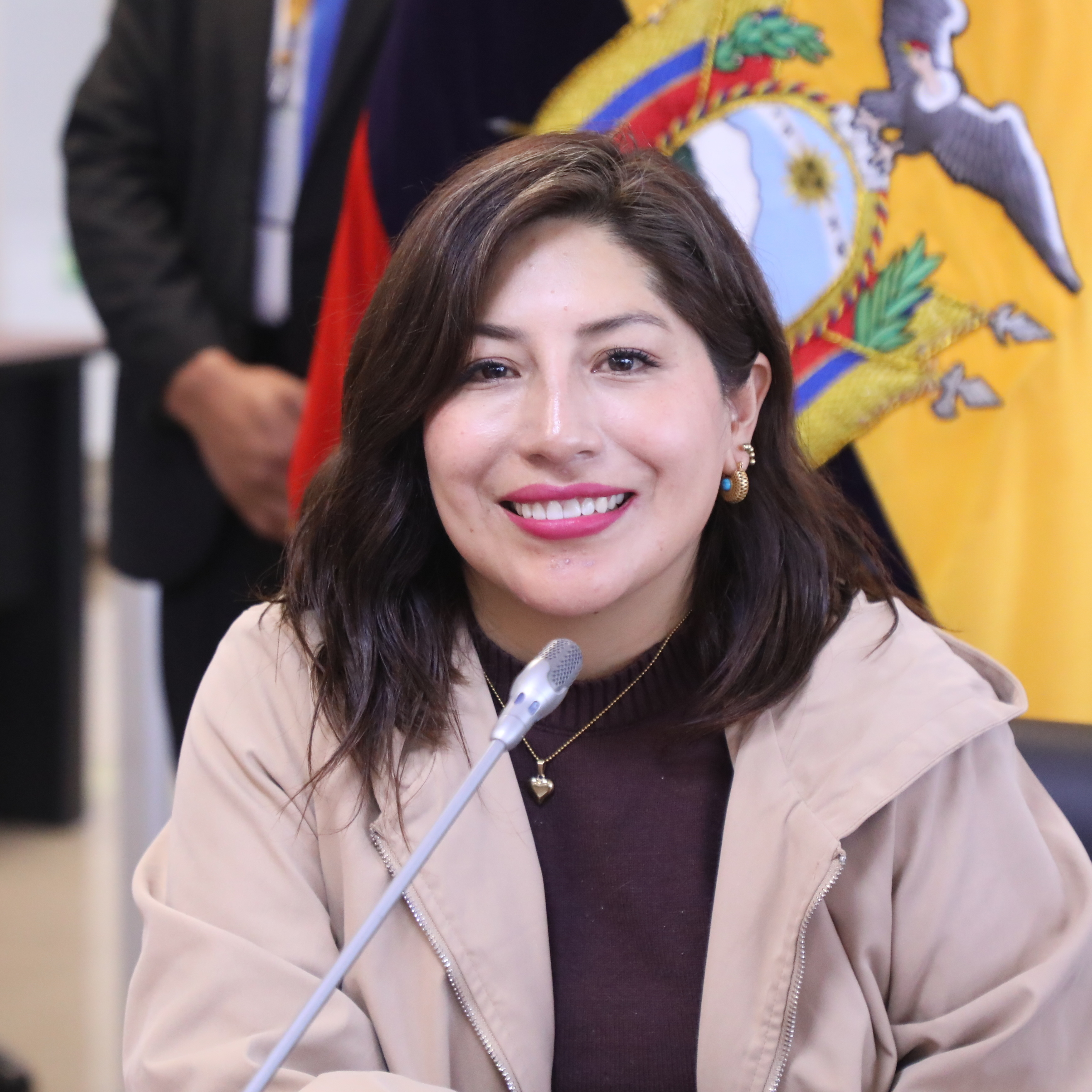
- in 2026
- Occupation: politician
- Political party: National Democratic Action (ADN)

Inés Margarita Alarcón Bueno is an Ecuadorian politician who became a member of the National Assembly of Ecuador in 2023. She was re-elected in 2025 and she chaired the Commission on Sovereignty, Integration and Comprehensive Security and a liaison committee with the European Union.

== Life ==
In 2017 she was a General Manager at BRICS Consortium CONBRICS CL which was established that year based in Sangolqui.

In 2023 there was unplanned election after the country's president decided to use an unusual clause in the constitution to avoid being impeached. He resigned but the clause required all of the National Assembly members to also resign. She joined the new National Democratic Action (ADN) party and became one of their candidates. Alarcón was elected to the National Assembly to represent Pichincha province. Her alternate was Cristobal Vaca. She joined the assembly's Permanent Commission on Sovereignty, Integration and Comprehensive Security and she became its president.

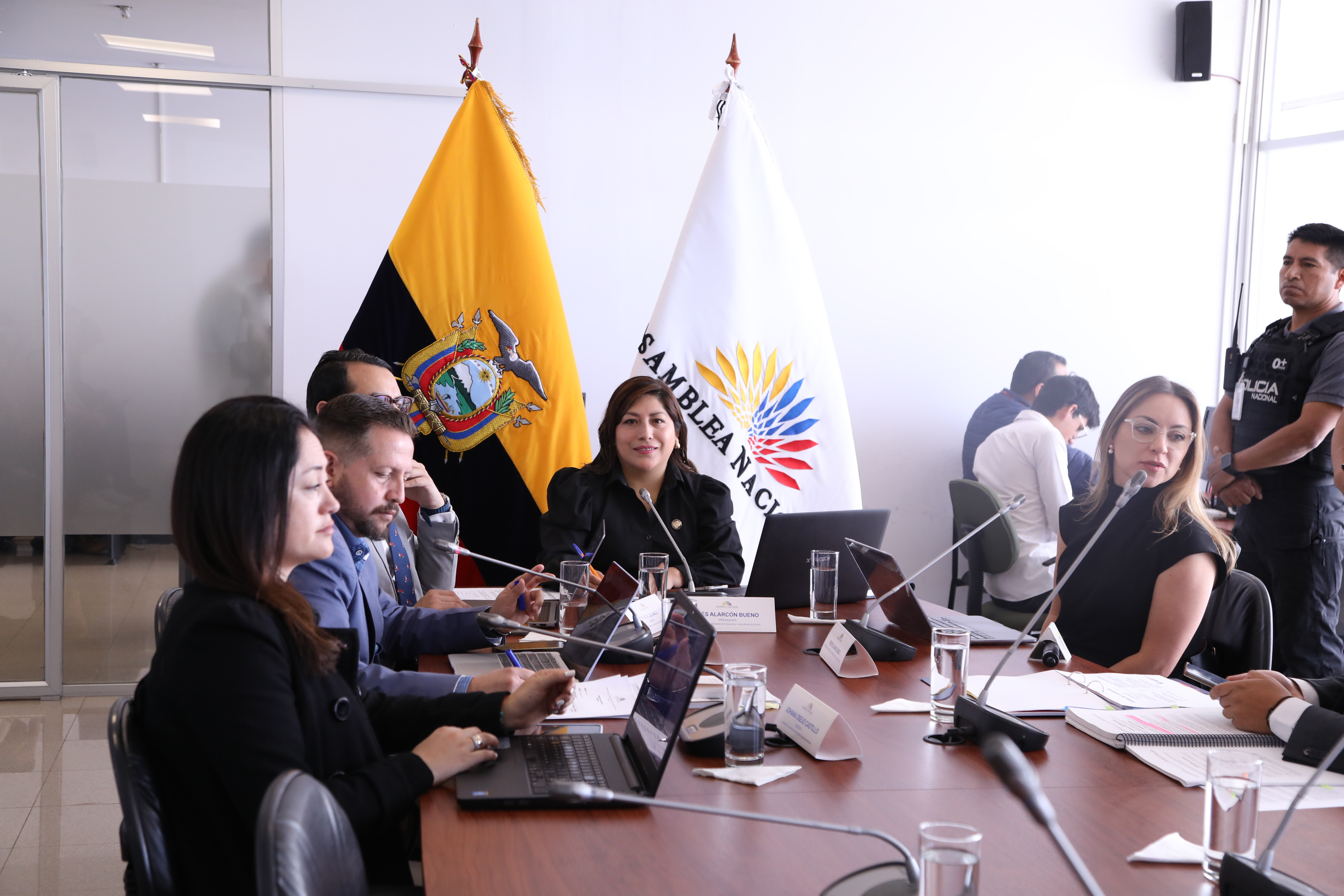
Mishel Mancheno appearing before the Integral Security Commission with Alarcón in the chair

In August 2024 she won a pyrrhic victory in the courts when the judge decided that impeachments could progress in the National Assembly against three former ministers of Guillermo Lasso:Pablo Arosemena, Andrea Montalvo and Sebastián Corral. However the secretary of the assembly, Alejandro Muñoz, announced that the assembly would not only not comply but it would consider taking action against the erroneous judge and Alarcón.

In September 2024 she was at threat of being suspended from the assembly. Political rival Paola Cabezas alleged that Alarcón had brought the assembly into disrepute. Cabezas said that Alarcon had referred to the impeachment of Attorney-General Diana Salazar as a "narco-trial". In reply, Alarcón proposed that this was just an attempt by Cabezas to avoid other issues that involved former leaders from her party. The accusation would be judged by the Assembly's Legislative Administration Council.

In March 2025 she chaired the Assembly's Security Commission who began an investigation into the "Liga Azul" (Blue League) for alleged sedition. She was chosen in 2025 to lead the National Assembly's Commission on Sovereignty, Integration and Comprehensive Security. Other members included Jhajaira Urresta, Jahiren Noriega, Mariana Yumbay, Camila Cueva and Karolina Dueñas. They will serve until 2027. In August she was elected to be the President of the Inter parliamentary group between Ecuador and the European Union and the other members included Analisse Josebeth Jaramillo Rodriguez, Diana Patricia Blacio Carrion, Cecilia Baltazar with Maria del Cisne Molina Coro as secretary.
