= Virgilio Saquicela =

Ecuadorian politician

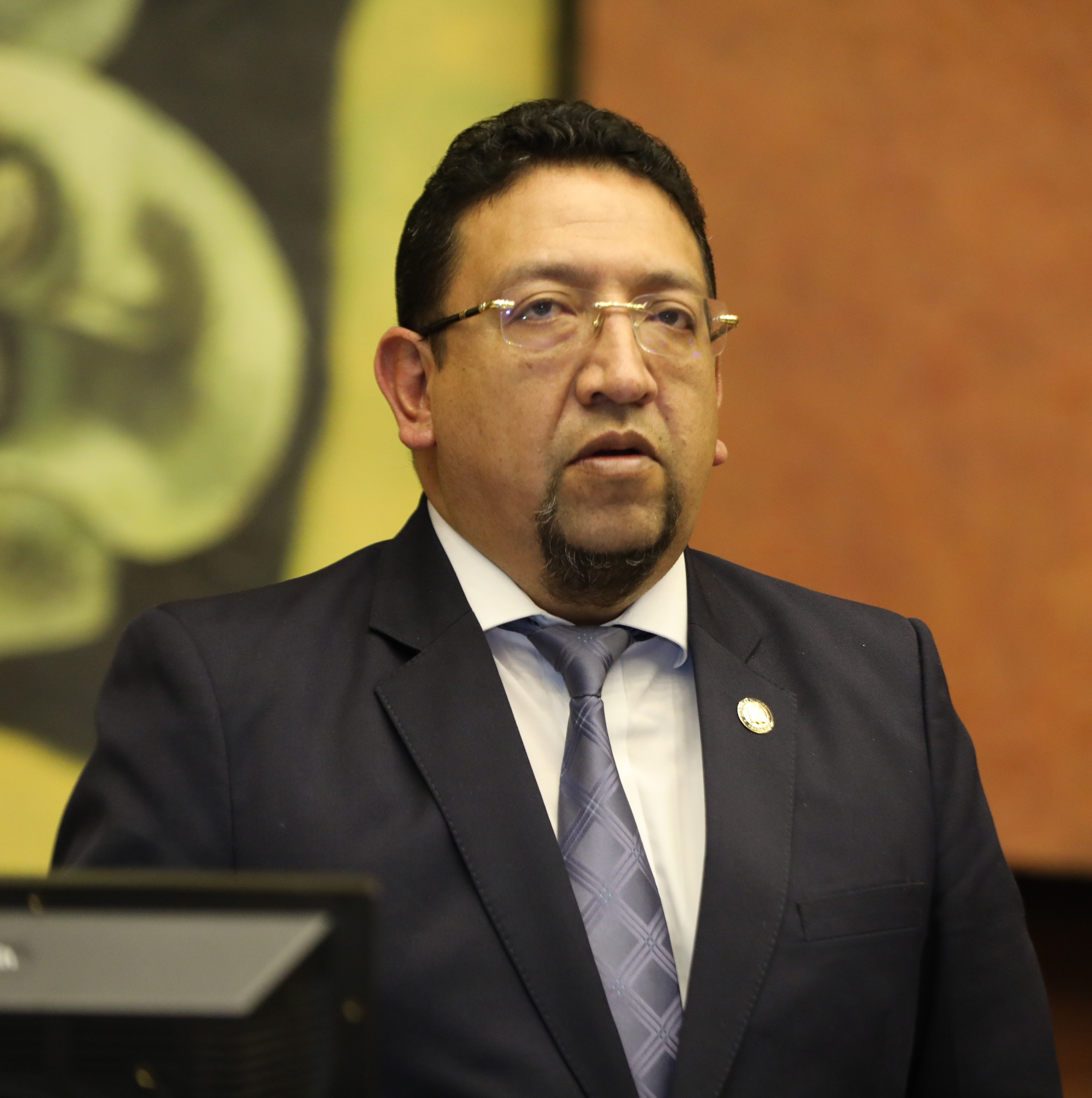

President of the National Assembly
- In office 31 May 2022 – 17 May 2023
- Preceded by: Guadalupe Llori
- Succeeded by: Henry Kronfle

Mayor of Azogues
- In office 2014–2019

Personal details
- Born: Javier Virgilio Saquicela Espinoza; 8 July 1972 (age 54) Azogues, Ecuador
- Party: MDS (2021–present)
- Other political affiliations: MUPP (2004–2014); CREO (2014–2019, 2021–present)
- Occupation: Politician; lawyer

Javier Virgilio Saquicela Espinoza (born 8 July 1972) is an Ecuadorian lawyer and politician who was the President of the National Assembly of Ecuador from 2022 to 2023. He served as mayor of Azogues between 2014 and 2019. He was ousted as President of the National Assembly after President Guillermo Lasso dissolved the National Assembly on 17 May 2023.

== Early life ==
Saquicela was born on 8 July 1972, in the Ecuadorian city of Azogues. He completed his primary and secondary education in his hometown, while higher education was carried out at the University of Cuenca, where he obtained a law degree.

== Political career ==
Saquicela entered politics in 2004, representing Pachakutik and was elected as a councilor for Azogues. He ran as a candidate for the prefecture of the province of Cañar in the 2009 local elections, but was defeated by Santiago Correa of the PAIS Alliance.

Saquicela ran as a candidate of CREO in the 2014 local elections, and was elected mayor of Azogues. In the 2019 local elections he ran for re-election but was defeated by Romel Sarmiento of the Social Christian Party. After his tenure as mayor, he became Ombudsman of Cañar.

Saquicela ran as a candidate of MDS in the 2021 general elections and was elected as a national assemblyman representing the province of Cañar. He joined the parliamentary caucus of CREO. He was proposed as first vice president of the National Assembly by Washington Varela, a national assemblyman of the Patriotic Society Party. On 15 May 2021, he was elected first vice president of the National Assembly, with a majority of 71 votes in favor out of 137. In his inauguration speech, he said; "We are here to legislate and oversee for the benefit of ordinary people in this country, to think a little less about the political class and more about them who have been abandoned. We are here to give governance to the President of the Republic and for justice to be impartial." He also expressed support to the independent assembly members and thanked them for their support.

Saquicela became the president of the National Assembly of Ecuador on 31 May 2022 after a motion to dismiss Guadalupe Llori was approved, with a majority of 81 votes in favor out of 137. He pledged to defend the institutionality of the National Assembly.

On 17 May 2023, Saquicela was removed from office along will all assembly members following President Guillermo Lasso's decision to invoke muerte cruzada. The following day, he filed a lawsuit before the Constitutional Court against Lasso's decree calling it unconstitutional.
