= Elizabeth Cabezas =

Ecuadorian politician

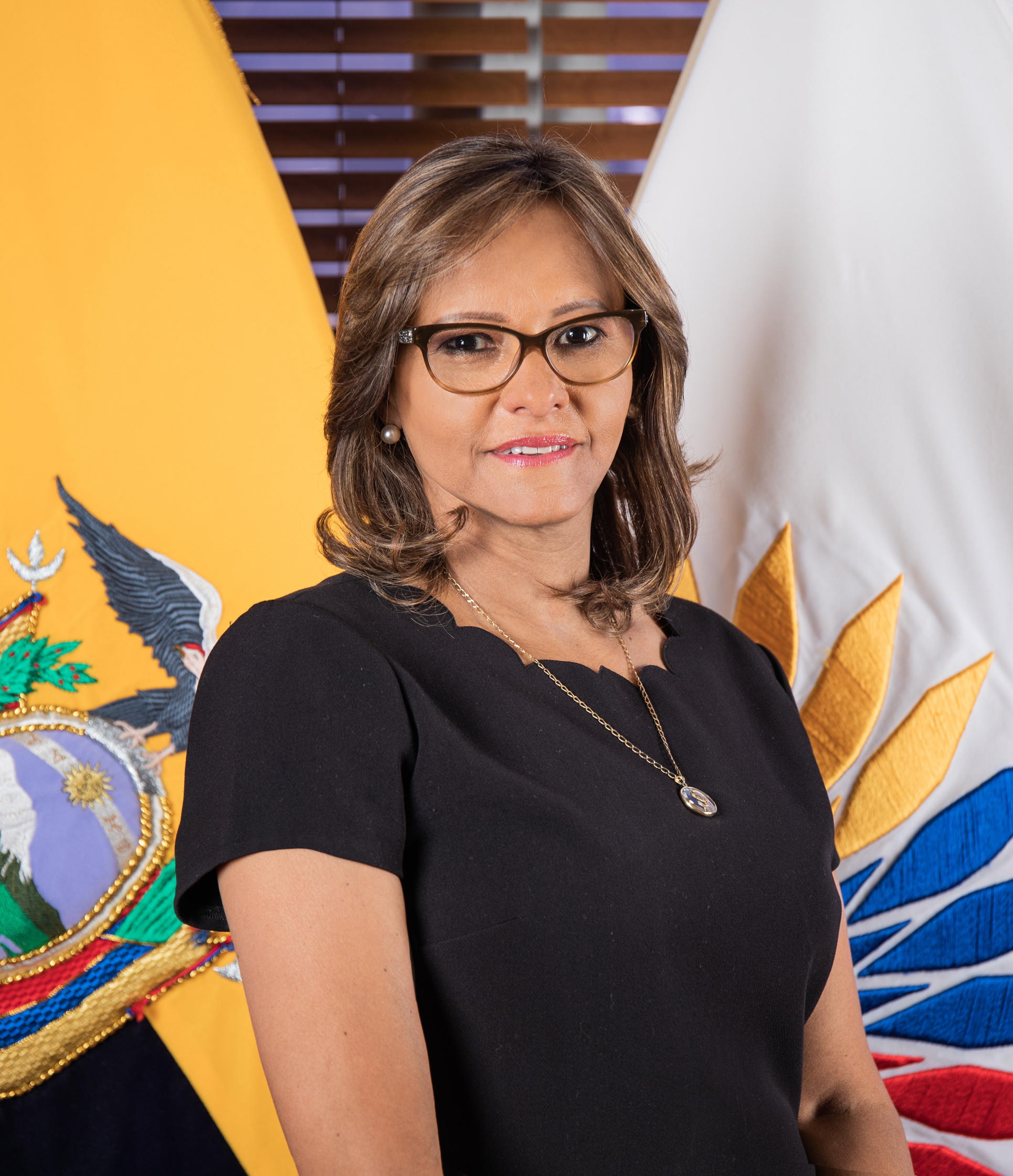

President of the National Assembly
- In office 14 March 2018 – 14 May 2019
- Preceded by: José Serrano Salgado
- Succeeded by: César Litardo

Ecuadorian National Assembly
- Incumbent
- Assumed office 14 May 2017

Metropolitan Council of Quito
- In office 1 August 2009 – 12 May 2014

Personal details
- Born: 14 June 1963 (age 63) Riobamba
- Party: PAIS Alliance
- Education: Universidad Católica de Santiago de Guayaquil
- Occupation: Economist and politician

Elizabeth Cabezas Guerrero (b. 14 June 1963, Riobamba) is an Ecuadorian economist and politician. She was elected the President of the National Assembly on 14 March 2018.

== Political career ==
Cabezas was elected to the Metropolitan Council of Quito in August 2009. She was next elected to the National Assembly in the 2017 Ecuadorian general election to represent Pichincha Province and the PAIS Alliance. Her election was criticized by the Popularity Unity party, who alleged electoral fraud. This accusation has been rejected by the National Election Council.

=== President of the National Assembly ===
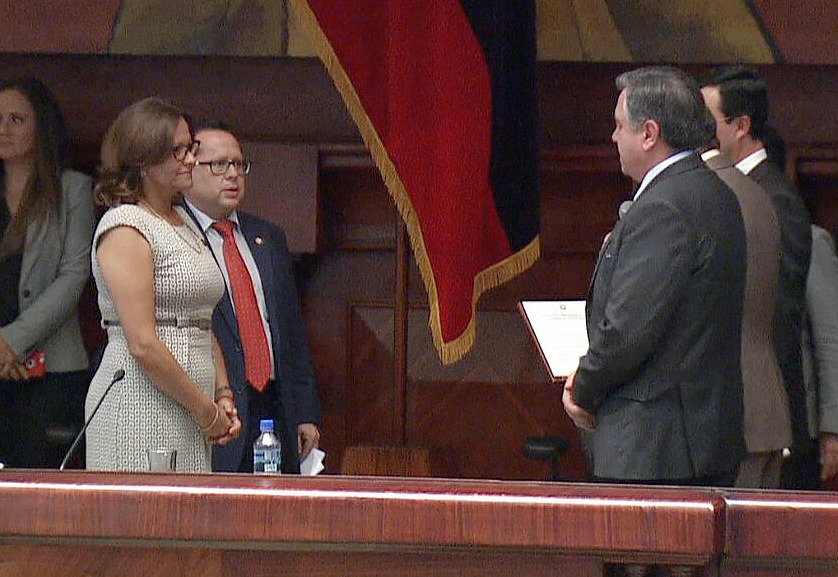
Elizabeth Cabezas during her term as the President of the National Assembly

Following the dismissal of José Serrano Salgado from his office and the shakeup in the PAIS Alliance headed by Lenín Moreno, Cabezas was elected the new President of the National Assembly on 14 March 2018. The portion of the PAIS Alliance still loyal to Rafael Correa denounced her election, as unconstitutional.
