= 1986 Ecuadorian referendum =

- 2 June 1986
- Do you want independent citizens to have the full right to be elected without the need to be affiliated with any political party, thus confirming the equality of all Ecuadorians before the Law?

Results
Choice	Votes	%
Yes	781,409	30.51%
No	1,779,697	69.49%
Valid votes	2,561,106	81.82%
Invalid or blank votes	569,255	18.18%
Total votes	3,130,361	100.00%
Registered voters/turnout	4,255,346	73.56%

A referendum on allowing the election of independents was held in Ecuador on 2 June 1986 alongside provincial elections. The proposal was rejected by 69% of voters.

The same question was later asked in a 1994 referendum, with voters voting in favour.

== Results ==
Do you want independent citizens to have every right to be elected without being affiliated to any political party, thus confirming the equality of all Ecuadorians before the law?

Choice	Votes	%
For	781,409	30.51
Against	1,779,697	69.49
Total	2,561,106	100.00
Valid votes	2,561,106	81.82
Invalid/blank votes	569,255	18.18
Total votes	3,130,361	100.00
Registered voters/turnout	4,255,346	73.56
Source: Direct Democracy
