= Niels Olsen Peet =

Ecuadorian politician

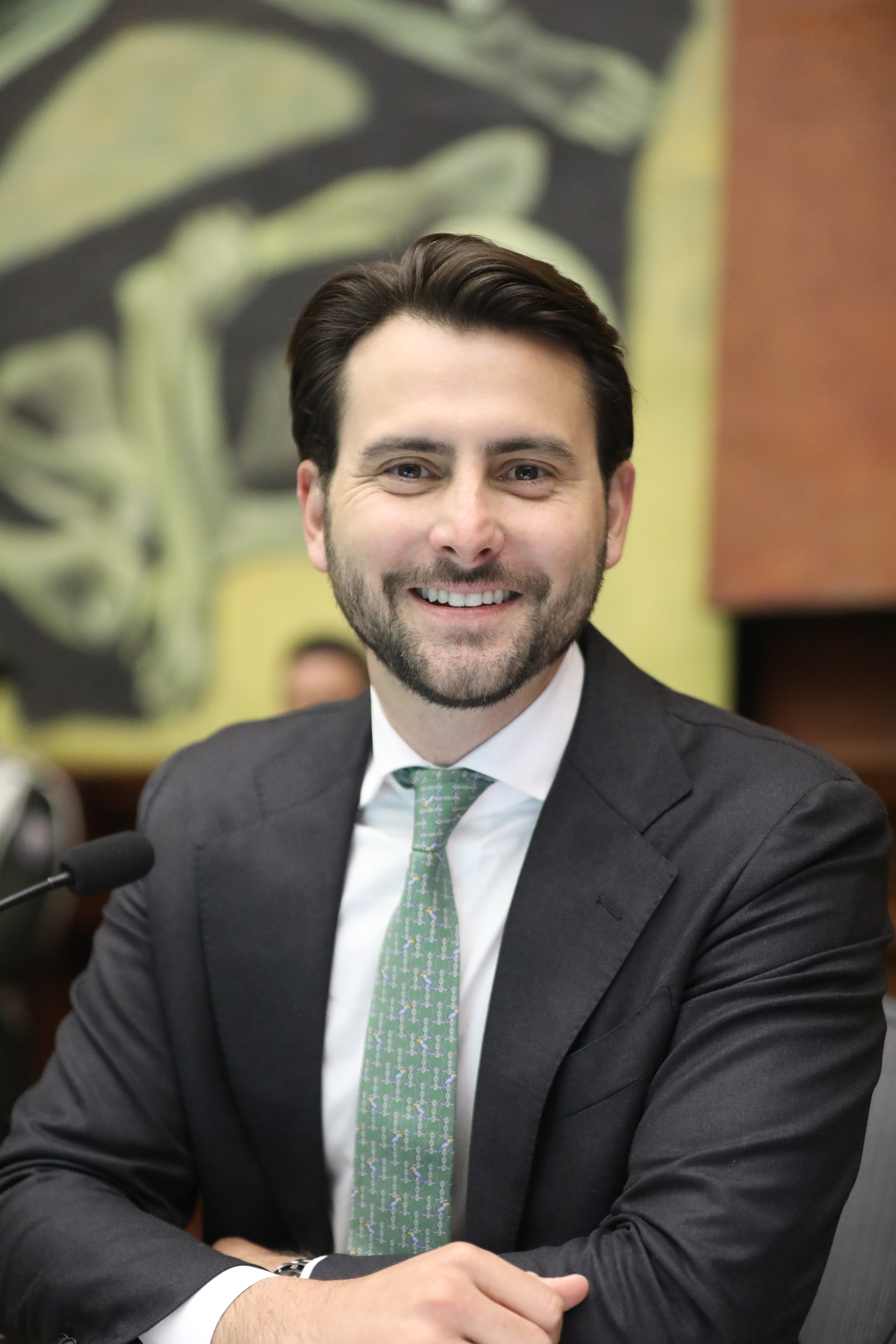
- Olsen in 2025

10th President of the National Assembly of Ecuador
- In office 14 May 2025 – 8 June 2026
- Vice President: Mishel Mancheno; Carmen Tiupul
- Preceded by: Viviana Veloz
- Succeeded by: Mishel Mancheno

Member of the National Assembly
- In office 14 May 2025 – 8 June 2026

Minister of Tourism of Ecuador
- In office 24 May 2021 – 30 August 2024
- President: Guillermo Lasso (2021–2023); Daniel Noboa (2023–2024)
- Preceded by: Rosa Prado Moncayo
- Succeeded by: Mateo Julián Estrella Durán

Personal details
- Born: Niels Anthonez Olsen Peet; 15 January 1988 (age 38) Guayaquil, Ecuador
- Party: National Democratic Action
- Education: Louisiana State University; Monash University

Niels Anthonez Olsen Peet (born 15 January 1988) is an Ecuadorian politician who served as the President of the National Assembly from 2025 until 2026. He was Minister of Tourism under Guillermo Lasso and Daniel Noboa.

== Early life and education ==
Niels Anthonez Olsen Peet was born on 15 January 1988. He graduated from Louisiana State University with a bachelor's degree in business administration and marketing and from Monash University with a master's degree in sustainable tourism.

== Career ==
Hacienda la Danesa, a hotel, was opened by Olsen after he returned to Ecuador in 2015. Olsen worked for the Australian Sports Museum and Ministry of Commerce, Trade, Tourism and Transport. At Sweet & Coffee he was marketing manager for three years.

Olsen served as Minister of Tourism under presidents Guillermo Lasso and Daniel Noboa. He stated that the Ecuadorian security crisis had little impact on tourism.

On 14 May 2025, Olsen was elected with 80 votes. He is considered an ally of Noboa and is a member of the National Democratic Action. He is the second youngest person to serve as president, behind Gabriela Rivadeneira. Henry Bósquez proposed to remove Olsen as president on 5 June, but it failed by a vote of 62 to 78 against.

== Personal life ==
Olsen is married to Romina Miraglia, with whom he had one son.

== Political positions ==
Olsen proposed creating a National Fund for Environmental Management that would collect fees and royalties for use in promoting tourism and strengthening Ecuador's bioeconomy. He supports using the National Police of Ecuador and the Armed Forces of Ecuador to handle environmental crimes.

== Works cited ==
=== News ===
- "ADN logra la presidencia y primera vicepresidencia de la Asamblea para los próximos 2 años". Cronica. 14 May 2025. Archived from the original on 30 June 2025.
- "El ministro Niels Olsen dice que la inseguridad en Ecuador afecta de manera muy baja al turismo". Ecuavisa. 3 October 2023. Archived from the original on 23 July 2024.
- "En la Asamblea Nacional fue negada la apelación a la presidencia de Niels Olsen". Ecuavisa. 5 June 2025. Archived from the original on 30 June 2025.
- "Niels Olsen, el empresario que desea impulsar el turismo". El Telégrafo. 17 May 2021. Archived from the original on 30 June 2025.
- "¿Quién es Niels Olsen Peet, nuevo presidente de la Asamblea Nacional?". El Universo. 14 May 2025. Archived from the original on 30 June 2025.
- Bravo, Diego (24 June 2025). "Asamblea Nacional: Niels Olsen plantea reforzar la protección de áreas naturales". Ecuavisa. Archived from the original on 30 June 2025.
- Muñoz, David (14 May 2025). "Quién es Niels Olsen, el nuevo presidente de la Asamblea Nacional 2025-2029". Ecuavisa. Archived from the original on 15 May 2025.
- Muñoz, Gianella (17 May 2021). "Romina Miraglia: "Los momentos en familia son los que más disfruto"". Expreso. Archived from the original on 17 December 2024.
- Valencia, Alexandra (14 May 2025). "Ecuador assembly elects ally of President Noboa as leader". Reuters.

=== Web ===
- "Ecuador". Inter-Parliamentary Union. Archived from the original on 30 June 2025.
- "Niels Olsen Peet" (PDF). Ministry of Tourism. Archived (PDF) from the original on 6 September 2024.
