= National Democratic Action =

National Democratic Action may refer to:

- National Democratic Action Society, a political party in Bahrain
- National Democratic Action (Acción Democrática Nacional, ADN), a political party in Ecuador
