= President of the National Assembly of Ecuador =

Head of the legislative of Ecuador

- Presidente de la Asamblea Nacional del Ecuador (Spanish)
- Parliamentary logo of the National Assembly

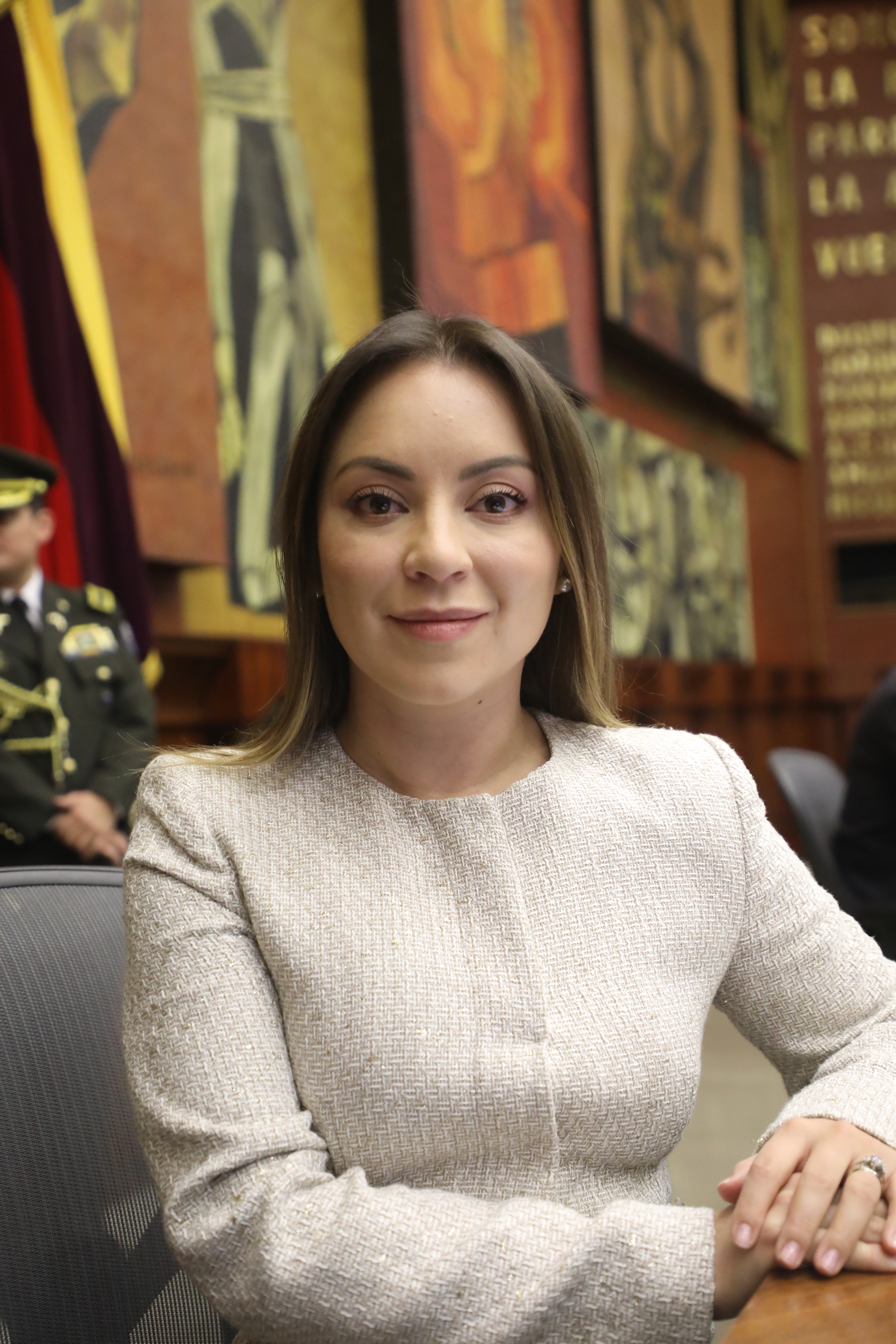
- Incumbent; Mishel Mancheno since 8 June 2026
- Appointer: National Assembly
- Term length: 2 years
- Inaugural holder: Modesto Larrea y Carrión (as the president of the National Congress)
- Formation: 31 August 2009
- Website: www.asambleanacional.gob.ec

The President of the National Assembly is the presiding officer of the legislature of Ecuador. In 2009 the National Congress of Ecuador was replaced by the National Assembly. The position of President of the National Assembly has existed since then.

== List of the Presidents ==
No.	Portrait	Name (Birth–Death)	Term of Office		Party
1		Fernando Cordero Cueva (1953–)	31 July 2009	14 May 2013	PAIS Alliance
2		Gabriela Rivadeneira (1983–)	14 May 2013	14 May 2017	PAIS Alliance
3		José Serrano (1970–)	14 May 2017	9 March 2018	PAIS Alliance
4		Elizabeth Cabezas (1963–)	14 March 2018	14 May 2019	PAIS Alliance
5		César Litardo (1979–)	14 May 2019	14 May 2021	PAIS Alliance
6		Guadalupe Llori (1962–)	15 May 2021	31 May 2022	Pachakutik
7		Virgilio Saquicela (1972–)	31 May 2022	17 May 2023	MDS
8		Henry Kronfle (1972–)	18 November 2023	2 October 2024	PSC
9		Viviana Veloz (1984–)	2 October 2024	14 May 2025	RC
10		Niels Olsen (1988–)	14 May 2025	8 June 2026	ADN
11		Mishel Mancheno (1991–)	8 June 2026	–	ADN

== See also ==
- List of presidents of the National Congress of Ecuador
