= Diana Blacio =

Ecuadorian politician (born 1990)

Diana Blacio Carrión
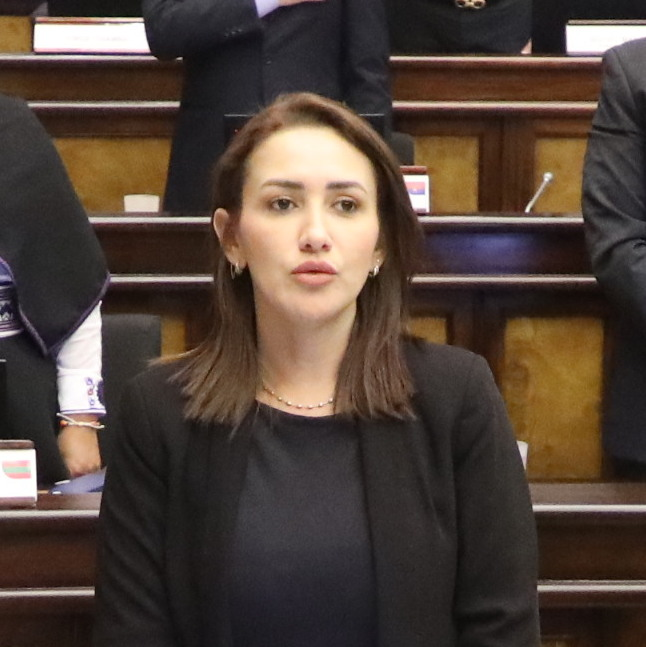
- Born: April 25, 1990 (age 36); Machala
- Occupation: politician
- Political party: National Democratic Action (ADN)

Diana Blacio or Diana Patricia Blacio Carrión (born 25 April 1990) is an Ecuadorian politician and entrepreneur. She was elected to the National Assembly in 2025 as a member of National Democratic Action (ADN).

== Life ==
Carrión was born in Machala.

In December 2023 she was put in charge of the Ministry of Economic and Social Inclusion (MIES)'s Zone 7 which includes Loja, El Oro and Zamora Chinchipe provinces.

She became a member of the National Assembly in 2025. She was on her party's national list which included Annabella Azin, Sade Fritschi and Diana Jácome. Her alternate is Andrade Robles Boris Stalin. She became a member and vice-President of the assembly's Standing Committee on the Right to Health and Sport. The President of that commission is Juan José Reyes Baquerizo and its members include Victoria Desintonio, Annabella Emma Azín Arce and Milena Cristina Jácome Benites.

In August 2025 she was at an Ecuadorian Professional Training Service facility in Machala, where she was born, seeing the facilities with the Minister of Labor Ivonne Núñez.
