= Valentina Centeno =

Ecuadorian politician

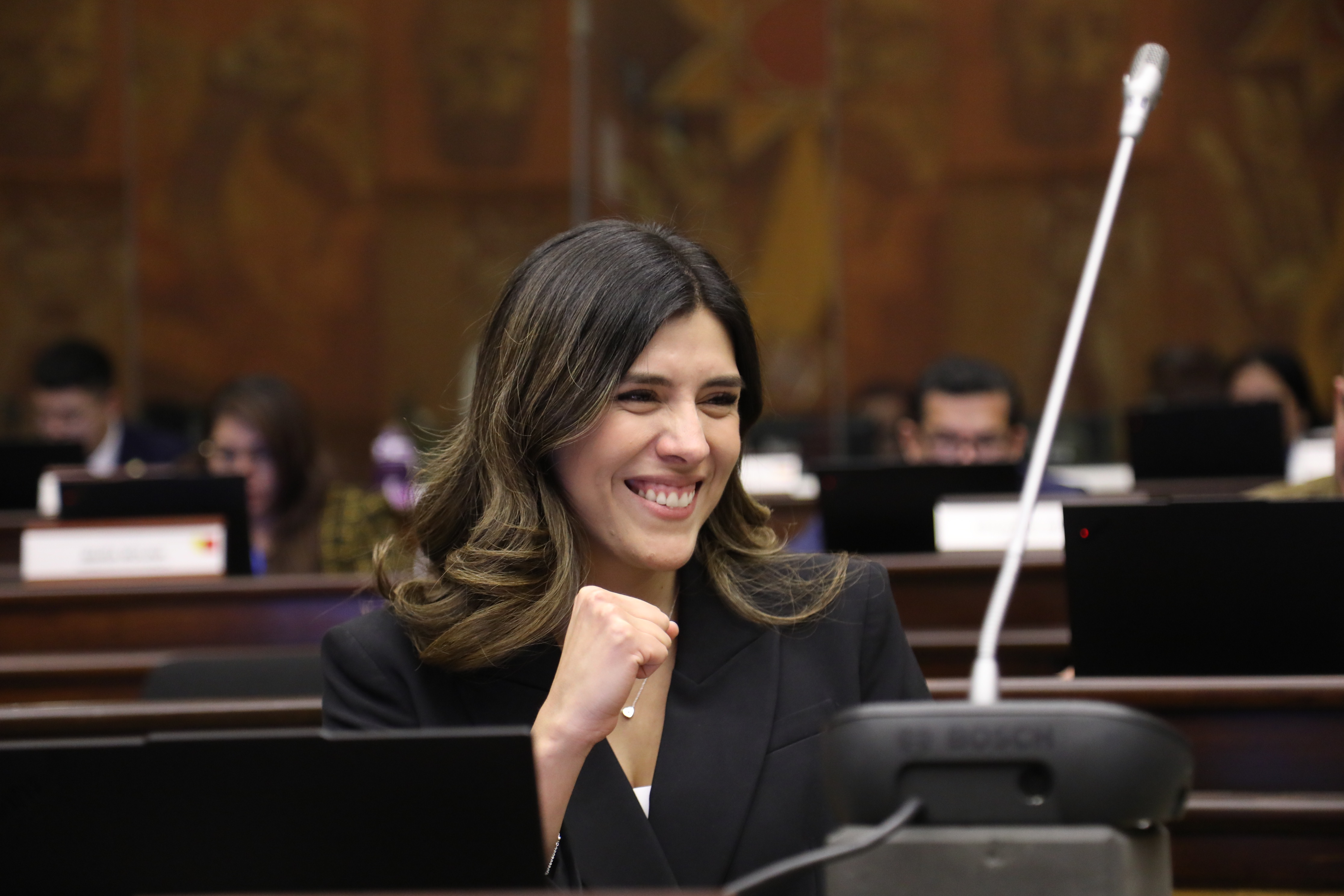
- Valentina Centeno in 2025.

Member of the National Assembly
- Incumbent
- Assumed office 17 November 2023
- Constituency: National list

Personal details
- Born: 14 February 1997 (age 29) Portoviejo, Ecuador
- Party: Independent
- Other political affiliations: National Democratic Action
- Education: Brown University School Of Engineering , Universidad San Francisco de Quito
- Occupation: Lawyer

Valentina Centeno Arteaga (born 14 February 1997) is an Ecuadorian lawyer and politician who was elected to Ecuador's National Assembly in 2023.

== Life ==
=== Early life and education ===
Valentina Centeno was raised in Portoviejo, Manabí Province.

She played beach volleyball and became national champion in 2014. She represented her country at the 2017 Bolivarian Games.

She studied law at San Francisco University of Quito then became a teaching assistant in private international law and corporate law.

=== Political career ===
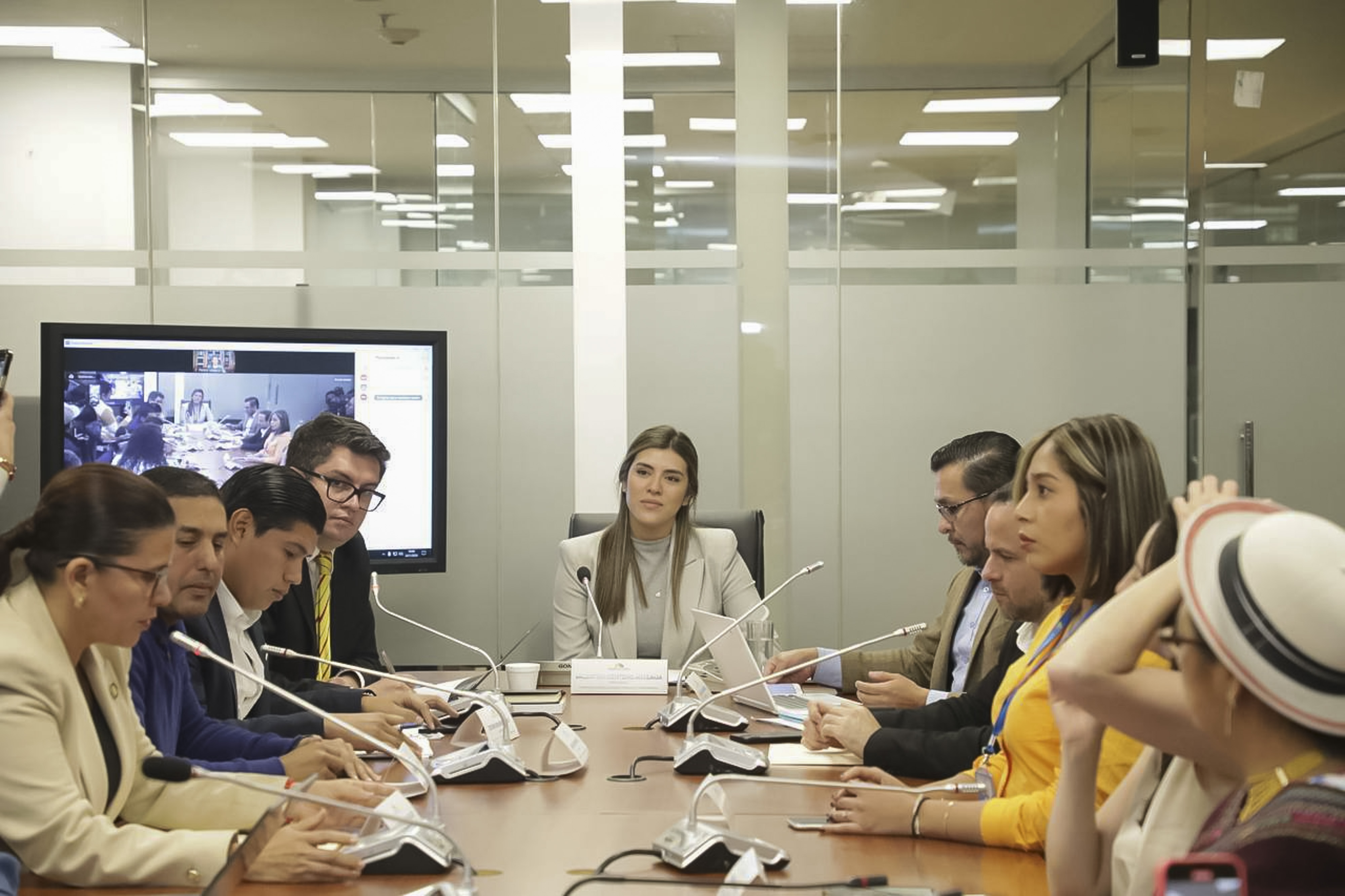
President of the permanent commission for Economic, Productive and Microenterprise Development in 2024

Valentina Centeno started working for the ministry of sports as local coordinator in May 2021 then as under secretary in November 2021.

On 20 August 2023, she was elected as a member of parliament of the National Assembly for the fourth legislative period at the 2023 Ecuadorian general election. She is affiliated with National Democratic Action and she is the group's leader in the National Assembly. As such, she led a coalition to support the government of the Ecuadorian president Daniel Noboa. She was elected the president of the permanent commission for Economic, Productive and Microenterprise Development. Other members of the commission include Diego Martín Franco Hanze, Mabel Méndez and Mishel Mancheno.
