= César Litardo =

Ecuadorian politician

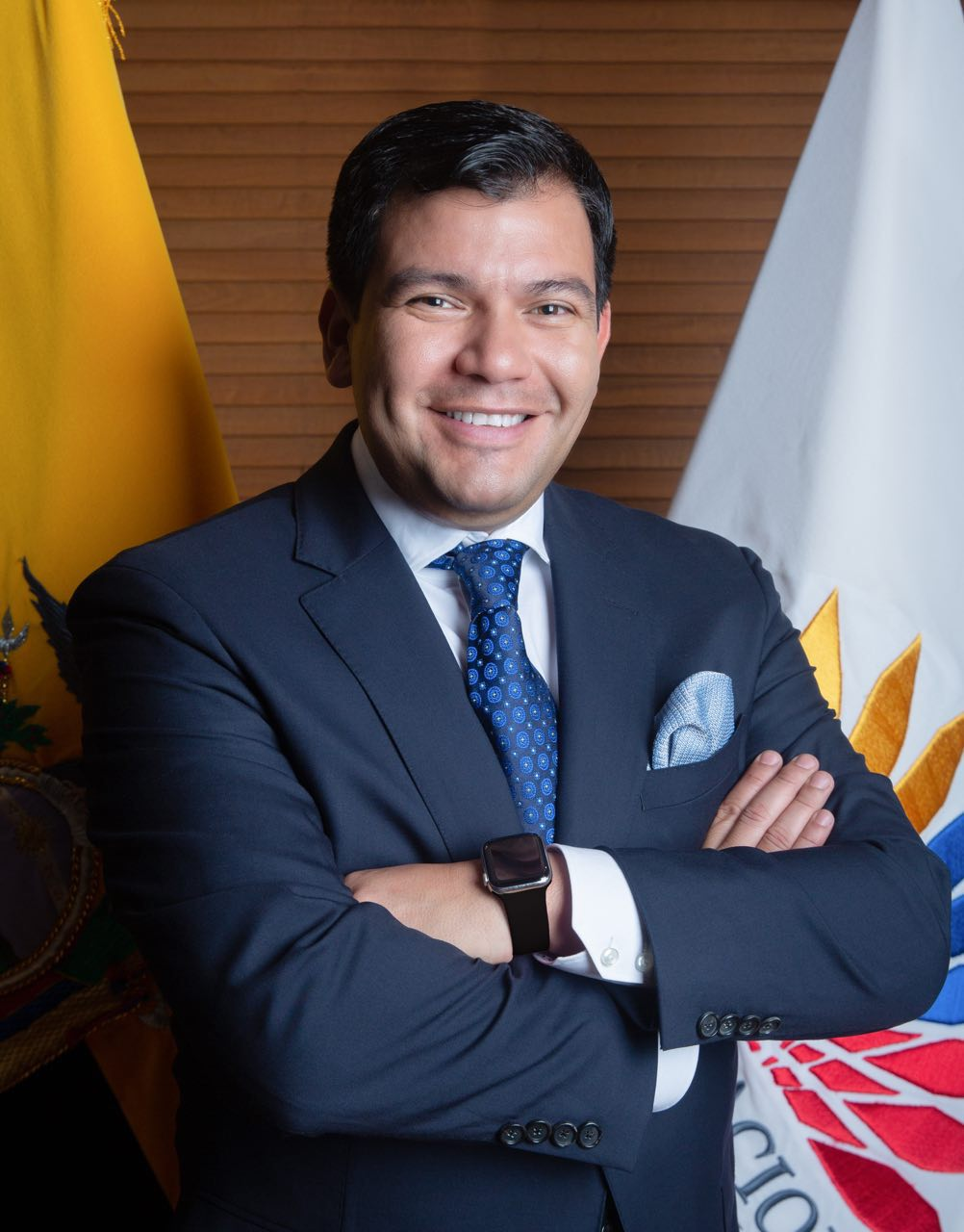

President of the National Assembly
- In office 14 May 2019 – 15 May 2021
- Preceded by: Elizabeth Cabezas
- Succeeded by: Guadalupe Llori

Personal details
- Born: 8 January 1979 (age 46); Quevedo, Ecuador
- Political party: PAIS Alliance
- Education: Universidad Católica de Santiago de Guayaquil
- Occupation: Economist and politician

César Ernesto Litardo Caicedo (born 8 January 1979) is an Ecuadorian economist and politician. He served as President of the National Assembly from 14 May 2019 to 15 May 2022.

== Early life and career ==
Litardo worked as a businessman and commercial engineer from the Province of Los Ríos. He was a manager of the foundation Quevedo, which regenerated the Quevedo boardwalk and other public spaces. He began his working life as a teacher at the State Technical University of Quevedo.

== Political activity ==
=== Assemblyman ===
In 2017, Litardo was elected member of the National Assembly for the province of Los Ríos, integrating the PAIS Alliance. He was part of the Commission for Food Sovereignty and Development of the Agricultural and Fisheries Sector. On 28 November 2018, he motioned for the approval of the report to reform the Law to Stimulate and Control the Production and Marketing of Banana, for export.

=== Popular Consultation Commission ===
After the popular consultation of 4 February 2018, the National Assembly formed a specialized commission to approve two laws derived from the positive result of two questions of said popular consultation: The Repeal Law of the Capital Gains Law and the Reform Law of the Council of Citizen Participation and Social Control. In the commission, Litardo served as vice president. The commission achieved the approval of both laws just one month after the popular consultation. In April 2018, a specialized commission on border security was formed, of which he was a member.

=== President of the National Assembly ===
On 14 May 2019, Litardo was elected President of the National Assembly with 78 votes in favor. On 15 May 2021 his term expired.
