= Guadalupe Llori =

Ecuadorian politician

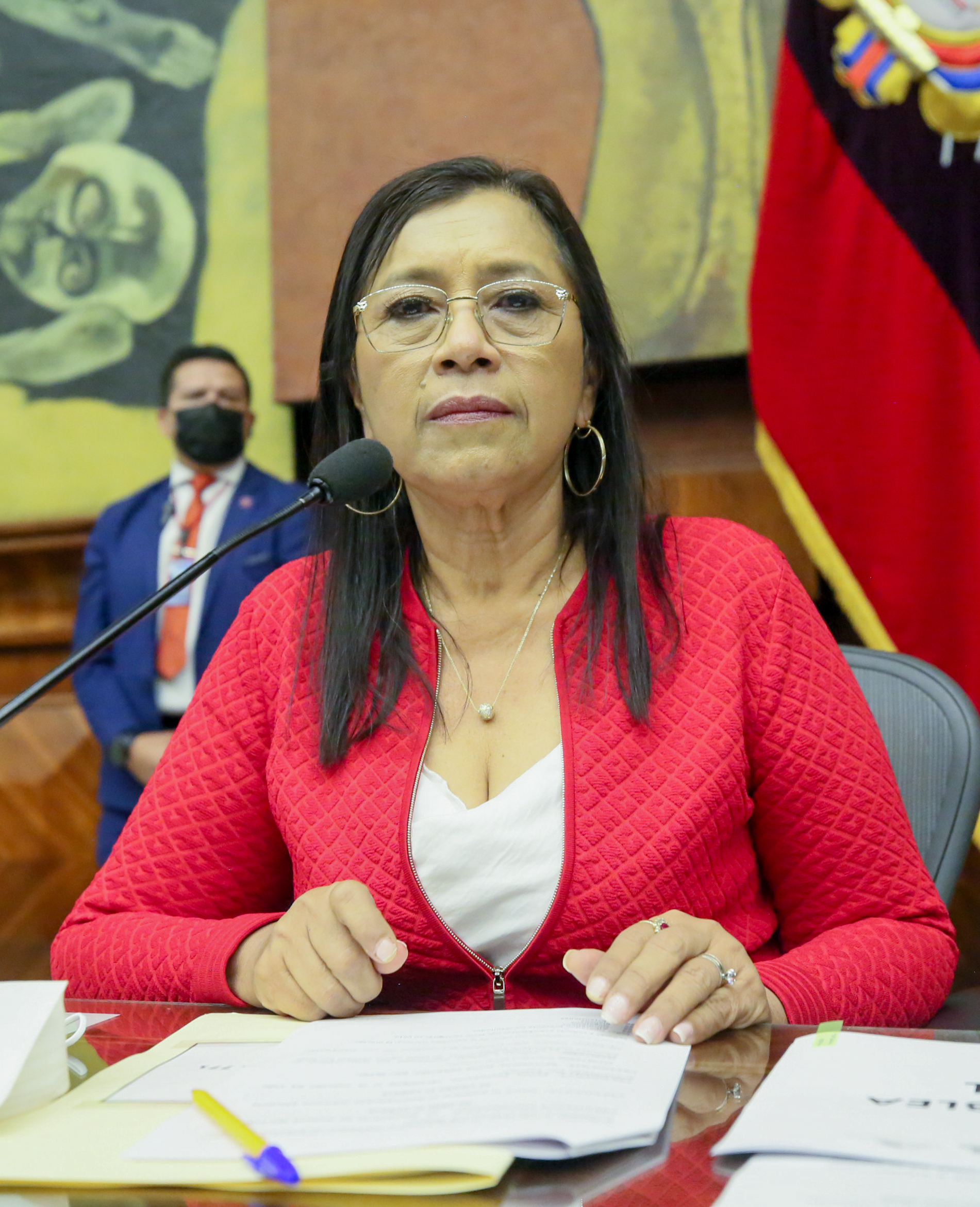

President of the National Assembly
- In office 15 May 2021 – 31 May 2022
- Preceded by: César Litardo
- Succeeded by: Virgilio Saquicela

Provincial Prefect of Orellana
- In office 2009–2018
- Preceded by: Alberto Zambrano
- In office 2005–2008
- Preceded by: Colon Caicedo
- Succeeded by: Alberto Zambrano

Mayor of Puerto Francisco de Orellana
- In office 2000–2004
- Preceded by: Eduardo Montaño Cortés
- Succeeded by: Anita Rivas

Personal details
- Born: Esperanza Guadalupe Llori Abarca; 1962 (age 63–64) Puerto Francisco de Orellana, Ecuador
- Party: Pachakutik
- Occupation: Politician

Esperanza Guadalupe Llori Abarca (born 1962) is an Ecuadorian politician who was prefect of Orellana Province. She is a member of the Pachakutik Plurinational Unity Movement. She served as President of the National Assembly of Ecuador from May 2021 to May 2022.

== Career ==
Llori began her political career with the 2000 Ecuadorian provincial elections, being elected mayor of Puerto Francisco de Orellana. Her term was primarily focused on improving healthcare. In the 2004 provincial elections, Llori was elected prefect of Orellana Province, representing the alliance of Pachakutik, Christian Democratic Union, and Social Christian Party.

On 8 December 2007, she was arrested on charges of sabotage and terrorism for allegedly organizing a strike in Dayuma, Ecuador. During her detention, she reported experiencing humiliation and mistreatment, compelling the Human Rights Foundation to send a complaint to the Ecuadorian government. On 25 January 2008, a judge of the Superior Court of Nueva Loja ordered her release, but the order was annulled just days later after the judge was accused of perverting the course of justice after stating his opinion on the matter to a local TV station.

In early March 2008, the Ecuadorian Constituent Assembly granted amnesty to everyone involved in the Dayuma strike, but Llori remained incarcerated. There were allegations against her of embezzlement of public funds intended for the construction of roads in Orellana Province. On 7 March, she was dismissed from her position by the provincial council in a 3–2 vote, and she was succeeded by Alberto Zambrano. In September of that year, she was cleared of the charge of embezzlement, finally leaving prison after nine months in prison. In January 2009, a judge ordered that Llori be restored to her office, but this was successfully appealed by Zambrano. Ultimately, she was re-elected to her office in the 2009 provincial elections for Pachakutik and defeated Zambrano and the Democratic People's Movement. She was reelected again in the 2014 elections by a wide margin.

On 15 May 2021, she was elected the new president of parliament in Ecuador. On 31 May 2022, she was removed as president of parliament in Ecuador and replaced by Virgilio Saquicela.

For the 2025 legislative elections, Guadalupe Llori was sponsored by the CREO movement but was not elected.
