= People, Equality and Democracy =

People, Equality and Democracy Pueblo, Igualdad y Democracia
- President: Arturo Moreno Encalada
- Founder: Arturo Moreno Encalada
- Founded: 2017
- Ideology: Big tent
- Political position: Centre-right
- National affiliation: ADN
- Colors: Red, Yellow and Green

People, Equality and Democracy (Spanish: Pueblo, Igualdad y Democracia), formerly United Ecuadorian (Spanish: Ecuatoriano Unido), is an Ecuadorian political movement that emerged in 2017 and registered in 2022. Its founder is Arturo Moreno Encalada, cousin of former President Lenín Moreno.

== History ==
=== As United Ecuatorian ===
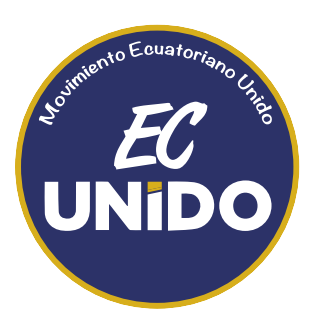
Logo as United Ecuatorian

The movement was born around the year 2015 under the name United Ecuadorian Movement by Lenin Moreno's brother, Edwin Moreno. In the 2019 Ecuadorian local elections, they obtained the prefecture of Zamora Chinchipe in alliance with the Juntos Podemos movement, Unidad Popular, Democracia Sí and the Ecuadorian Socialist Party with Cléver Jiménez as a candidate.

In the 2021 Ecuadorian presidential election, its candidate was Pastor Gerson Almeida, whose candidacy called himself "pro-life". Almeida's candidacy received criticism from progressives for his opposition to abortion and homosexuality.

In November 2021, the National Electoral Council canceled the registry of United Ecuadorian due to not getting the minimum of votes to keep its registry in two consecutive elections. Later in 2022, People, Equality and Democracy was admitted in the electoral registry, keeping the same number of list than United Ecuadorian, the 4.

=== As PID ===
For the 2023 Ecuadorian presidential election, PID is one of two parties which forms the National Democratic Action alliance that supports the candidacy of Daniel Noboa Azin for President of Ecuador. Arturo Moreno Encalada himself, the founder of the party, gained a bench for the National Assembly at the same general election.

== Election results ==
=== Presidential election ===
Year	Candidate		First round		Second round		1st round position	2nd round position
Year	President	Vice president	Votes	%	Votes	%	1st round position	2nd round position
2021	Gerson Almeida	Martha Cecilia Villafuerte	160.571	1.73	Eliminated		8th	Eliminated
2023	Daniel Noboa Azin	Verónica Abad Rojas	2,315,296	23.41	5,251,695	51.83	2nd	1st

=== Legislative elections ===
Year	Leader	National List			Provincial List			Foreign List		
Year	Leader	Votes	%	Seats	Votes	%	Seats	Votes	%	Seats
2021	Rocío Juca	166,888	2.08	0	193,840	2.38	2	1 407	1.75	0
2023*	Valentina Centeno	1,219,254	14.56	2	884,747	10.31	11			1

=== Sectional elections ===
Year	Prefectures	Mayors
2019	1 / 23	14 / 221

== See also ==
- List of political parties in Ecuador
