= 1994 Ecuadorian referendum =

A seven-part referendum was held in Ecuador on 28 August 1994. Voters were asked whether they approved of allowing independents to run in elections, whether the National Assembly should manage the state budget, whether to distribute the state budget by government department or region, whether to allow unlimited re-election for politicians, whether to elect members of the National Assembly in one or two rounds of voting, whether to allow dual citizenship, and whether the National Assembly should approve constitutional reforms within 100 days.

== Results ==
=== Allowing the election of independents ===
Do you consider independent citizens not affiliated to any political party should be entitled to participate as candidates in every popular election?

Choice	Votes	%
For	1,797,454	65.03
Against	966,778	34.97
Invalid/blank votes	1,214,175	–
Total	3,978,407	100
Registered voters/turnout		
Source: Direct Democracy

=== Allowing the National Assembly to control the state budget ===
Should legislators manage the funds of the state budget?

Choice	Votes	%
For	450,283	16.60
Against	2,262,007	83.40
Invalid/blank votes	1,262,055	–
Total	3,974,345	100
Registered voters/turnout		
Source: Direct Democracy

=== Distributing the state budget ===
Choice	Votes	%
By government department	1,286,402	54.02
By region	1,094,682	45.98
Invalid/blank votes	1,595,287	–
Total	3,976,371	100
Registered voters/turnout		
Source: Direct Democracy

=== Unlimited terms of office ===
Choice	Votes	%
For	1,423,623	52.76
Against	1,274,254	47.24
Invalid/blank votes	1,278,443	–
Total	3,976,320	100
Registered voters/turnout		
Source: Direct Democracy

=== Electoral system for the National Assembly ===
Choice	Votes	%
One round	1,348,624	55.72
Two rounds	1,071,407	44.28
Invalid/blank votes	1,555,026	–
Total	3,975,057	100
Registered voters/turnout		
Source: Direct Democracy

=== Allowing dual citizenship ===
Choice	Votes	%
For	2,087,262	72.82
Against	778,786	27.18
Invalid/blank votes	1,110,065	–
Total	3,976,113	100
Registered voters/turnout		
Source: Direct Democracy

=== Constitutional reforms to be approved by the National Assembly within 100 days ===
Choice	Votes	%
For	1,579,663	59.07
Against	1,094,687	40.93
Invalid/blank votes	1,302,124	–
Total	3,976,474	100
Registered voters/turnout		
Source: Direct Democracy
