= Esteban Torres (Ecuadorian politician) =

Ecuadorian politician (born 1989)

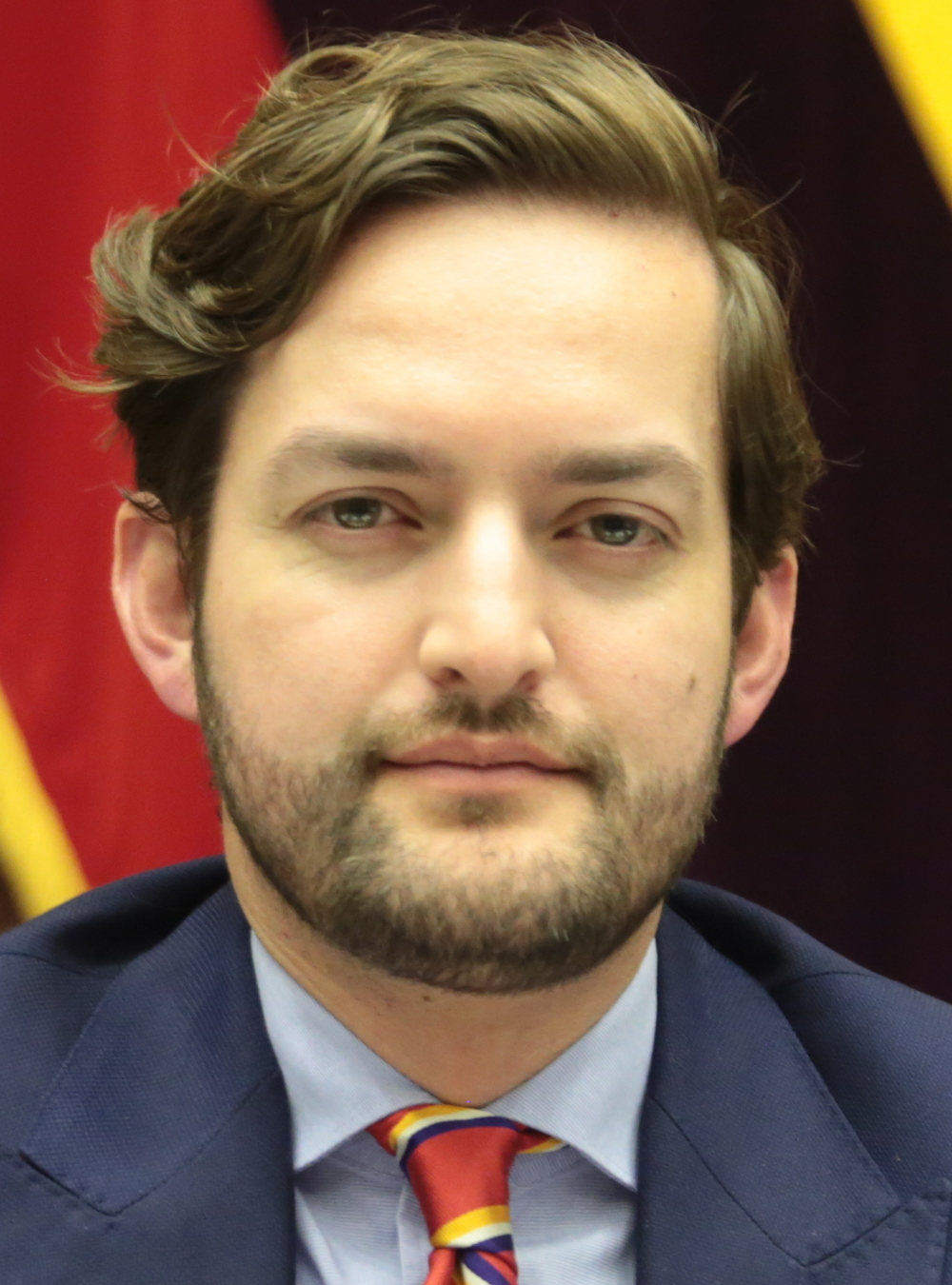
- Torres in 2023

Member of the National Assembly
- Incumbent
- Assumed office 14 May 2025
- In office 19 December 2018 – 17 May 2023
- Preceded by: Luis Fernando Torres
- Constituency: Tungurahua

Personal details
- Born: 12 September 1989 (age 36)
- Party: Tiempo de Cambio (since 2017); National Democratic Action (since 2024)
- Other political affiliations: Christian Social Party (2017–2023)
- Parent: Luis Fernando Torres (father)

Luis Esteban Torres Cobo (born 12 September 1989) is an Ecuadorian politician. He has been a member of the National Assembly since 2025, having previously served from 2018 to 2023. He is the son of Luis Fernando Torres.
