= Mishel Mancheno =

Ecuadorian lawyer and politician

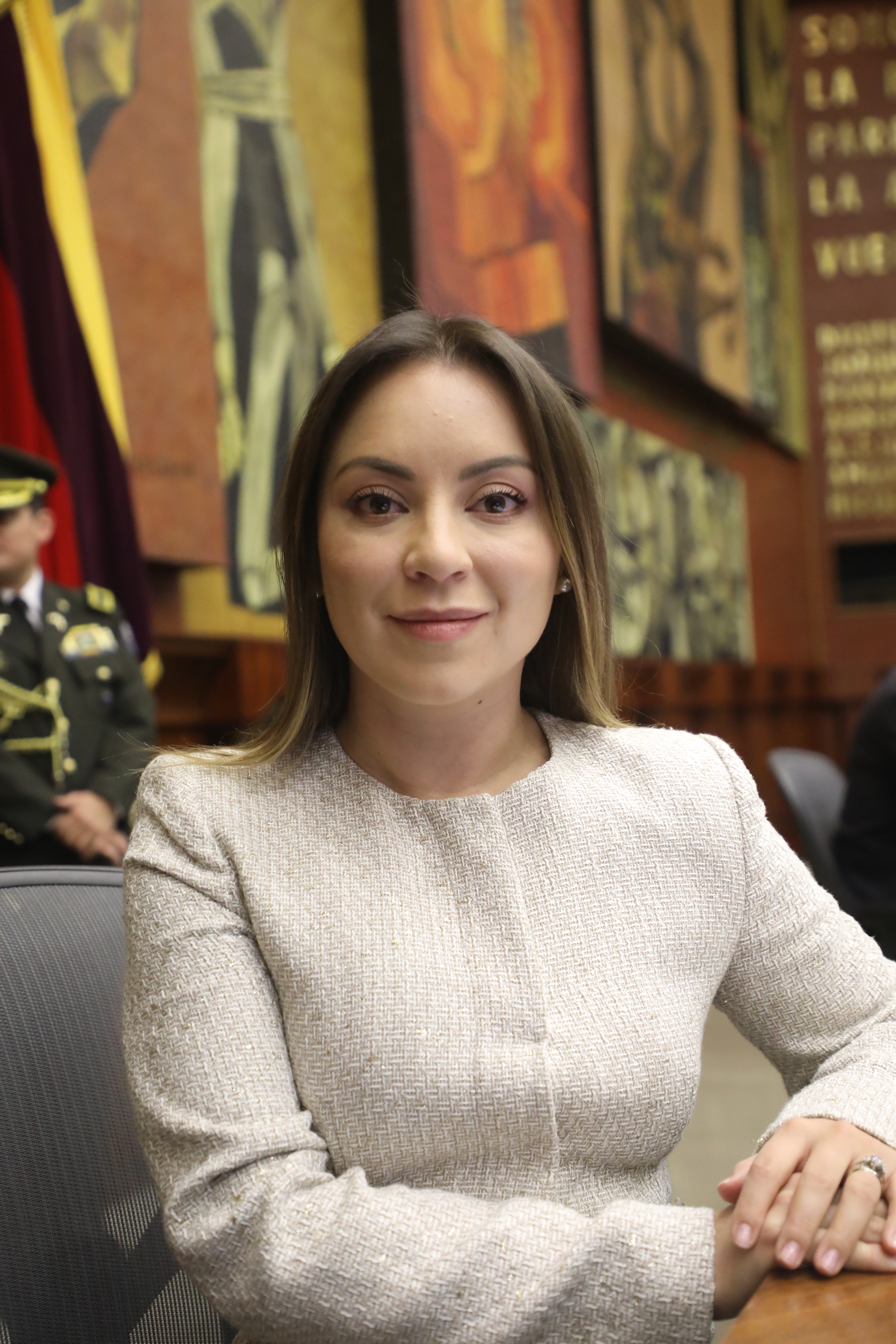
- Mancheno in 2025

President of the National Assembly
- Incumbent
- Assumed office 8 June 2026
- Vice President: Esteban Torres; Carmen Tiupul
- Preceded by: Niels Olsen Peet

First Vice President of the National Assembly
- In office 14 May 2025 – 8 June 2026 Serving with Carmen Tiupul
- President: Niels Olsen Peet
- Preceded by: Otto Vera
- Succeeded by: Esteban Torres

General Secretary of the National Democratic Action
- Incumbent
- Assumed office 30 July 2025
- President: Daniel Noboa
- Preceded by: María Gabriela Cordero

Legal Secretariat of the Presidency
- In office 23 November 2023 – 25 September 2024
- President: Daniel Noboa
- Preceded by: José Julio Neira
- Succeeded by: Stalin Andino

Member of the National Assembly
- Incumbent
- Assumed office 14 May 2025
- Constituency: Chimborazo

Personal details
- Born: Mishel Andrea Mancheno Dávila; 1991 (age 34–35) Riobamba, Ecuador
- Party: National Democratic Action
- Education: National University of Riobamba; University of Valencia

Mishel Andrea Mancheno Dávila (born c. 1991) is an Ecuadorian lawyer and politician who is currently serving as President of the National Assembly since 2025. She has previously served as the Legal Secretary to the Presidency from 2023 until 2024. In 2024 she stood down to stand for the election and she became the National Assembly's vice president.

== Life ==
Mancheno studied law at the Universidad Nacional de Chimborazo and business management at the Interamerican University of Ecuador. She has a master's degree from the Spanish University of Valencia.

On 23 November 2023 at the Carondelet Palace she was formally made the Legal Secretary to the new President Daniel Noboa. Other appointments that day included Gabriela Sommerfeld, and Arianna Tanca. New ministers in the government also included Ivonne Núñez, Monica Palencia and Zaida Rovira.

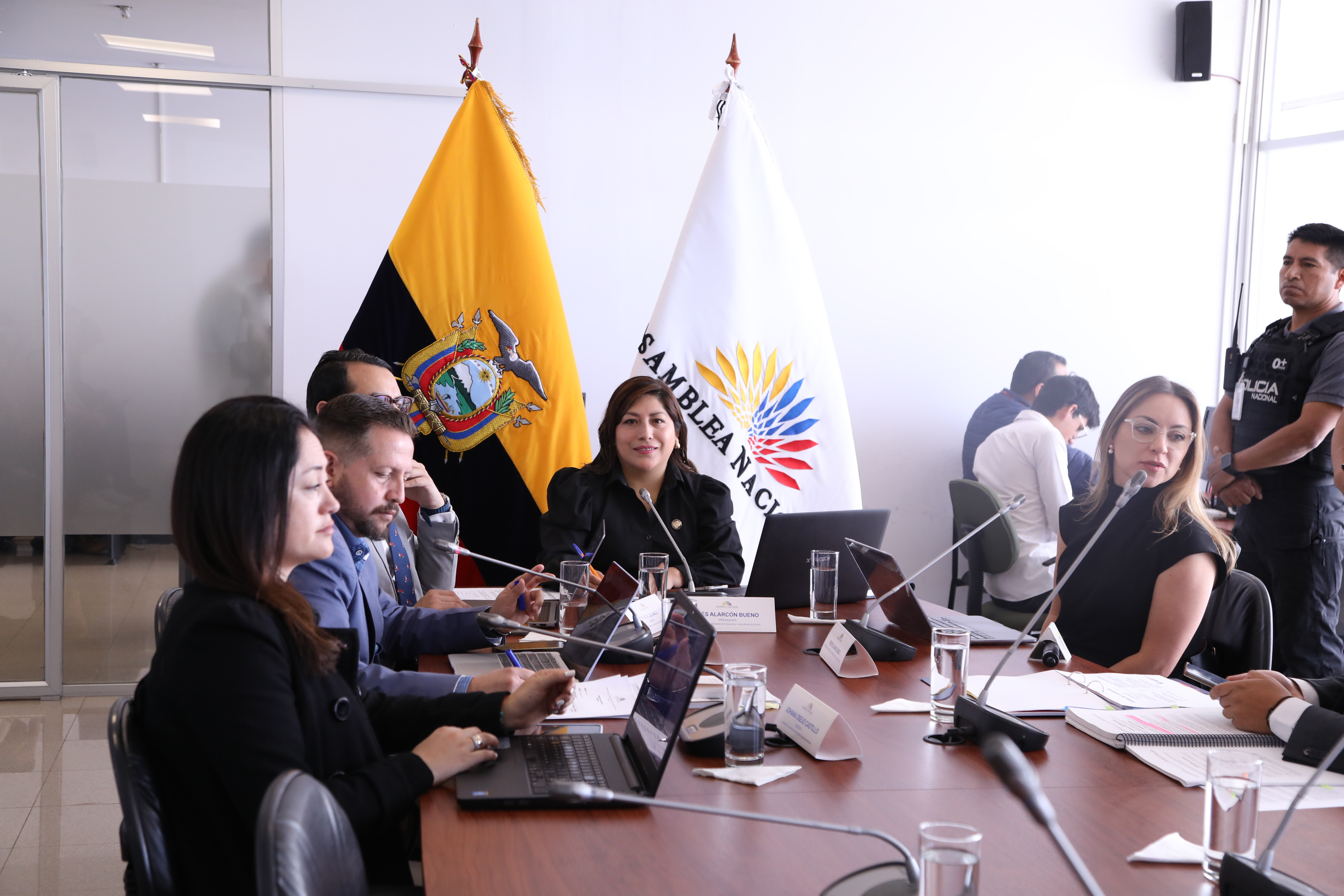
Mishel Mancheno appearing before the Integral Security Commission with Inés Alarcón in the chair

In 2024, Mancheno joined the board of the Mining Control Agency. She had previously been a director of the Agency for the Regulation and Control of Energy and Non-Renewable Natural Resources before it closed.

In September 2024 she left her position as the president's legal secretary to become a National Democratic Action (ADN) politician. She was replaced by Santiago Andino. The ADN party registered their National Assembly candidates for the 2025 elections in the province of Chimborazo in October 2024. Mancheno was their prime candidate.

In the 2025 elections she was elected to the National Assembly to represent Chimborazo. In May she became the first vice-president on the assembly with Niels Olsen who was also from the National Democratic Action party as the President. The second vice-president was Carmen Tiupul from the Pachakutik party.
