= RETO Movement =

Political party in Ecuador

RETO Movement Movimiento RETO
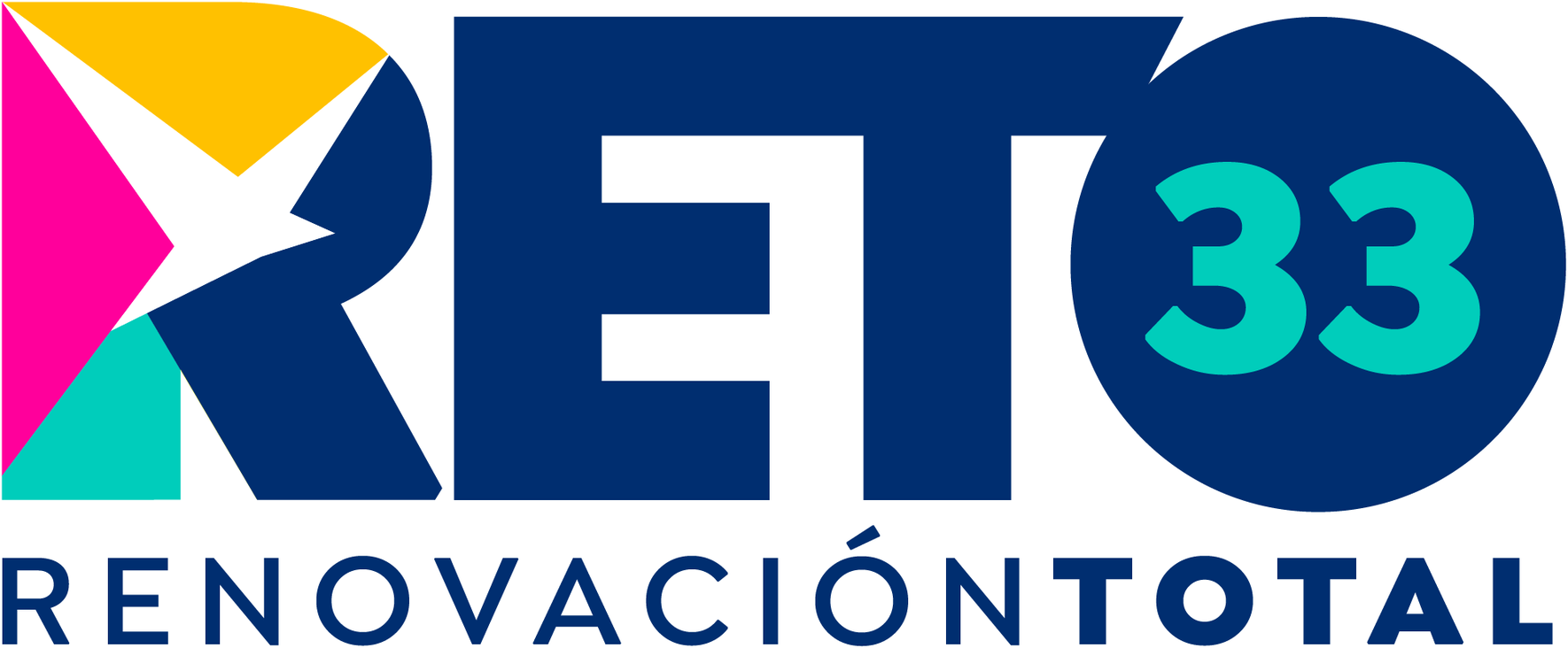
- Leader: Paúl Carrasco
- President: Eduardo Sánchez
- Registered: 2018
- Membership: 176,546 (2018)
- Ideology: Social democracy
- Political position: Centre-left
- Slogan: "Accept RETO!"
- National Assembly: 1 / 151

Website
- www.movimientoreto.com

The RETO Movement (Spanish: Movimiento RETO; short for Movimiento Renovación Total, RETO) is an Ecuadorian political party. It was founded by former Azuay Prefect Paúl Carrasco in 2018. Though it is composed by multiple partisan coalitions, it is mainly centre-left.

For the 2023 Ecuadorian general election, the party endorsed Xavier Hervas.

== Election results ==
=== National Assembly elections ===
Election	Leader	Votes	%	Seats	+/–
2023	Paúl Carrasco	141,577	1.69	0 / 137	–
2025 (Note: Ran in coalition with the Citizen Revolution Movement, gained 1 seat)	Paúl Carrasco	3,764,096	41.32	1 / 151	▲1
