= National Democratic Action (Ecuador) =

Political party in Ecuador since 2021

National Democratic Action Acción Democrática Nacional
- Abbreviation: ADN
- President: Daniel Noboa
- General Secretary: Mishel Mancheno
- Spokesperson: Valentina Centeno
- Founder: Daniel Noboa
- Founded: 20 November 2021
- Legalised: 23 May 2024
- Preceded by: Forward Ecuadorian Forward Party
- Headquarters: Guayaquil, Ecuador
- Ideology: Conservatism; Conservative liberalism
- Political position: Right-wing
- Alliance members: People, Equality and Democracy; MOVER
- Colours: Purple; Yellow
- Slogan: The New Ecuador Solves
- National Assembly: 66 / 151
- Prefects: 1 / 23
- Mayors: 1 / 222
- Andean Parliament: 3 / 5

Website
- adn-ecuador.org
- Politics of Ecuador; Political parties; Elections; A: It has also been described as centre-right and far-right.

The National Democratic Action (Spanish: Acción Democrática Nacional, ADN) is a political alliance and movement in Ecuador created to support the candidacy of Daniel Noboa in the 2023 presidential election.

== History ==
Daniel Noboa announced his presidential candidacy in May 2023 following the Ecuadorian political crisis. He received the support of the People, Equality and Democracy (PID) and MOVER parties, which became members of the ADN. In the following months, Noboa organized this movement, which for a long time did not receive legal status. Noboa's running mate was conservative entrepreneur Verónica Abad Rojas, from Cuenca.

The relation of this political platform with former president Lenín Moreno is noteworthy, as PID was founded and is presided by Arturo Moreno Encalada, cousin of the former politician, and MOVER was the ruling party during much of Moreno administration when it was still PAIS Alliance, with Moreno serving as the president of PAIS when he was president of Ecuador.

In the 2023 presidential election, Noboa took second place in the first round of voting on August 12, before winning the runoff round (and thereby the presidency) on October 15. Valentina Centeno is party leader at the National Assembly.

== Composition ==
The coalition is composed of the following parties:

Party	Abbr.	Leader	Ideology	Membership
People, Equality and Democracy; Pueblo, Igualdad y Democracia	PID	Arturo Moreno	Big tent	since 2023
MOVER; MOVER	MOVER	René Espín	Neoliberalism	2023–2024

== Election results ==
=== Presidential elections ===
Election	Party candidate	Votes	%	Votes	%	Result
Election	Party candidate	First round		Second round		Result
2023	Daniel Noboa	2,315,296	23.47%	5,251,695	51.83%	Elected ✓
2025	Daniel Noboa	4,527,428	44.17%	5,870,618	55.62%	Elected ✓

=== National Assembly elections ===
Election	Leader	Votes	%	Seats	+/–
2023	Valentina Centeno	1,219,254	14.56	11 / 116	New
2025	Daniel Noboa	3,948,392	43.34	66 / 151	▲55
