= National Assembly (Ecuador) =

Legislature of Ecuador

Coordinates: 0°12′47″S 78°29′56″W

National Assembly Asamblea Nacional
- National Assembly (2025–present)
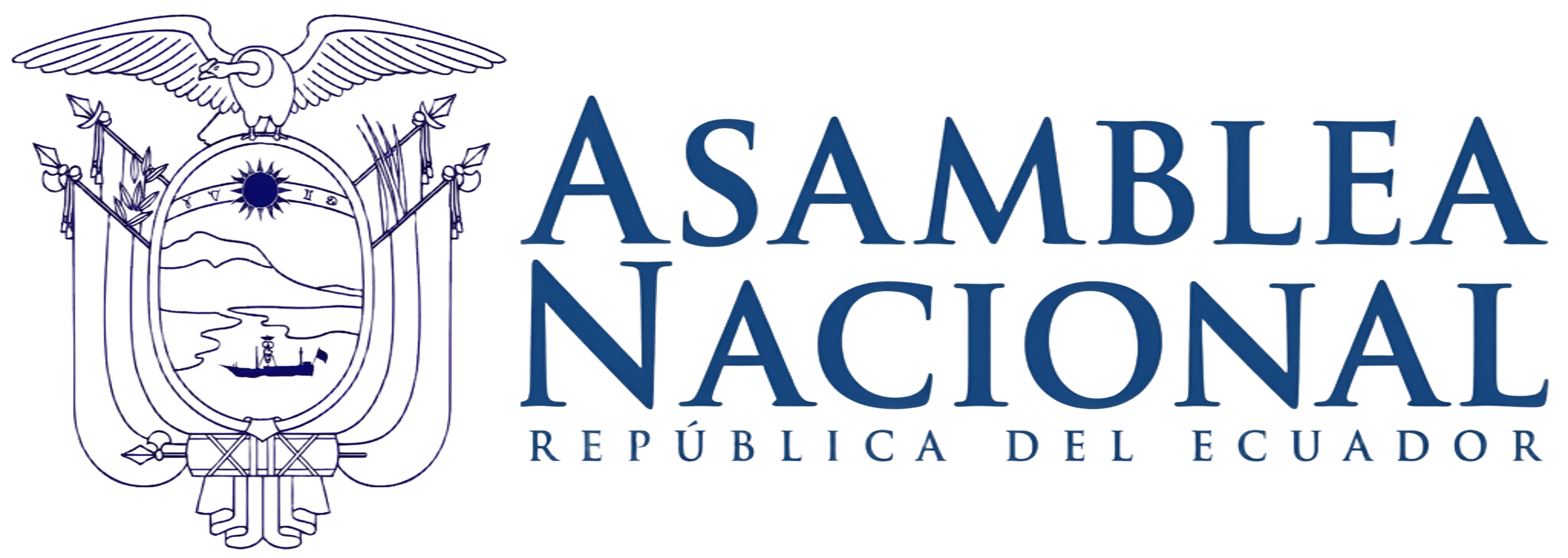

Type
- Type: Unicameral

History
- Founded: September 28, 2008; 18 years ago
- Preceded by: National Congress

Leadership
- President: Mishel Mancheno, ADN since 8 June 2026
- 1st Vice President: Esteban Torres, ADN since 10 June 2026
- 2nd Vice President: Carmen Tiupul, Ind. since 14 May 2025

Structure
- Seats: 151 (Note: The National Assembly has 151 principal (seat-holding) members and 151 alternate members.)
- Political groups: Government (66): ADN (66); Independents (19): MUPP (9); PSC (4); Provincial movements (2); PSP (1); RETO (1); Independent (2); Opposition (66): RC (65); UP (1)

Elections
- Last election: 9 February 2025
- Next election: By 2029

Meeting place
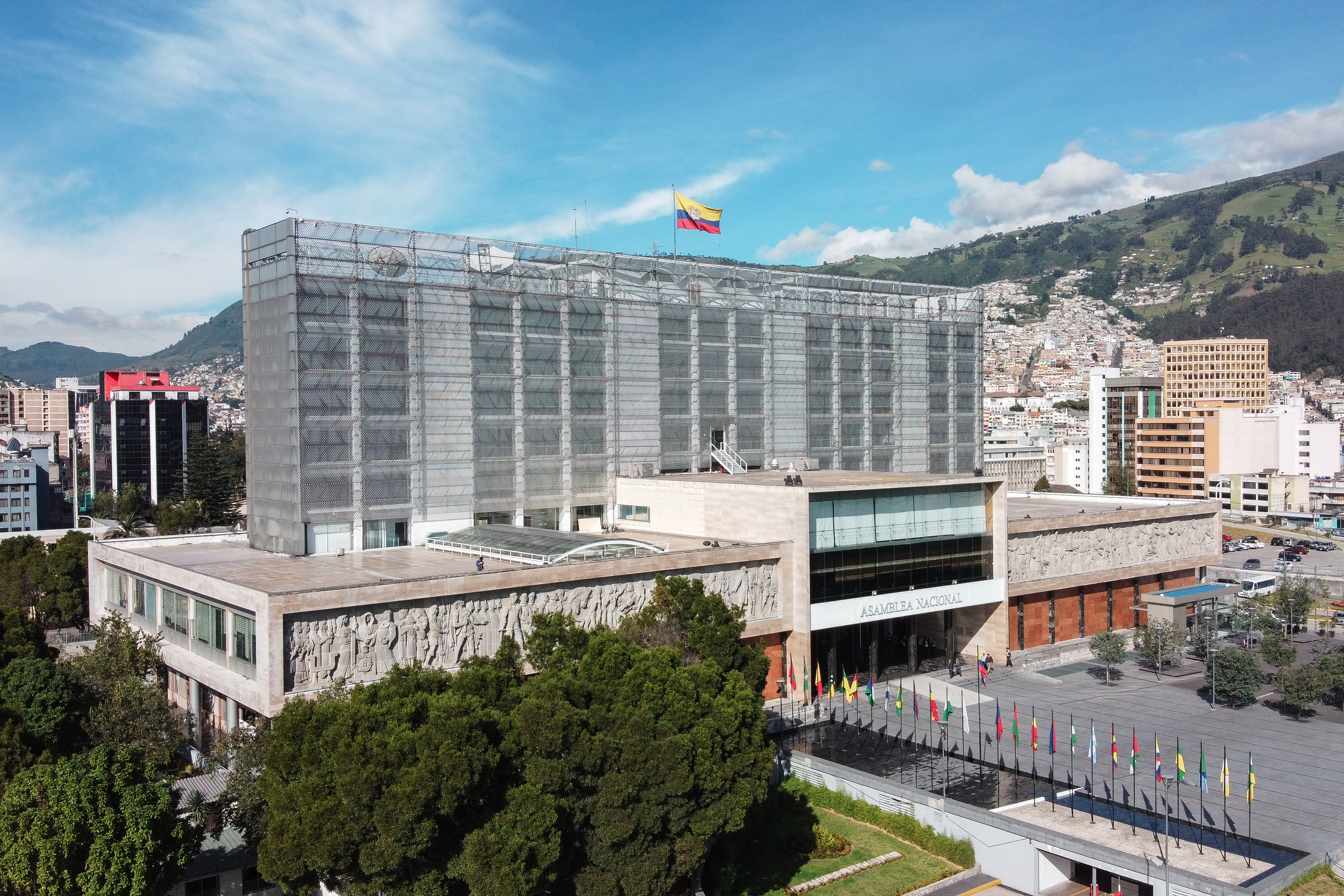
- National Assembly Building; Avenida 6 de Diciembre y Piedrahita; Quito, Pichincha, Ecuador
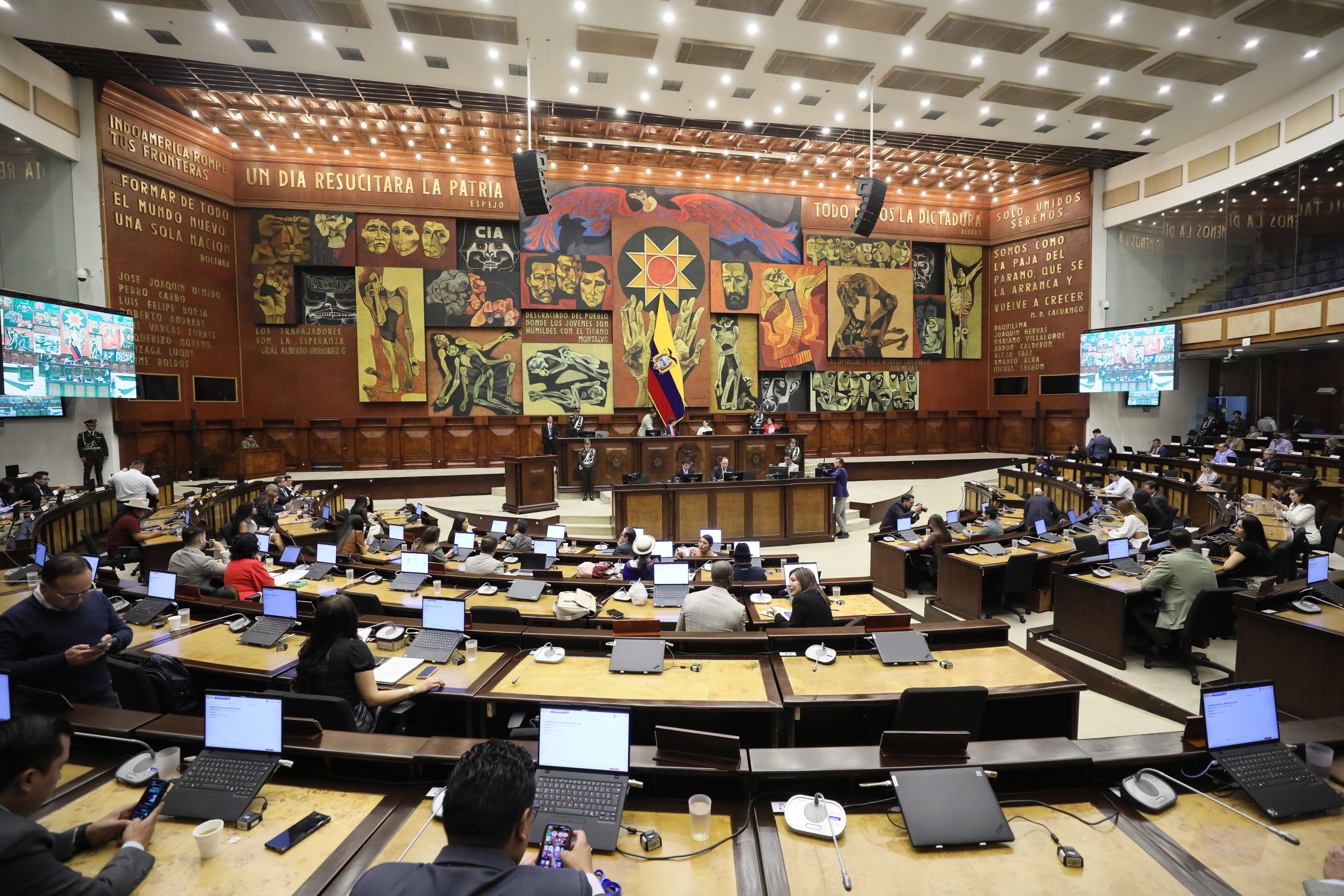
- Interior of National Assembly

Website
- Official website

The National Assembly (Spanish: Asamblea Nacional) is the unicameral legislature of Ecuador. It replaced the National Congress in 2009 following reforms under the 2008 Constitution. Within Ecuador, the National Assembly has the power to pass laws, while appointment of judges to the National Court of Justice is done by a separate Judicial Council.

== Eligibility ==
According to Article 119 of the 2008 Constitution of Ecuador, candidates to the National Assembly must meet the following requirements:

- Be an Ecuadorian national.
- Be at least 18 years of age at the time of registering for one's candidacy
- Be in possession of political rights

== Ecuadorian general election, 2025 ==
Party	National			Provincial			Overseas			Total seats	+/–
Party	Votes	%	Seats	Votes	%	Seats	Votes	%	Seats	Total seats	+/–
National Democratic Action	3,948,532	43.34	7			56			3	66	+52
Citizen Revolution Movement–RETO (Note: 66 seats won by RC, one won by RETO.)	3,764,230	41.32	7			57			3	67	+13
Christian Social Party	288,545	3.17	1			3			0	4	–10
Patriotic Society Party	210,083	2.31	0			1			0	1	–2
AMIGO Movement	162,721	1.79	0			0			0	0	–1
Popular Unity	156,802	1.72	0			1			0	1	0
SUMA Party	149,404	1.64	0			0			0	0	–4
Creating Opportunities	119,480	1.31	0			0			0	0	0
Ecuadorian Socialist Party	91,778	1.01	0			0			0	0	-1
Democratic Left	90,383	0.99	0			0			0	0	0
People, Equality and Democracy	67,367	0.74	0			0			0	0	0
Democratic Center	61,559	0.68	0			0			0	0	–1
Pachakutik						9			0	9	+5
Movimiento Construye						1			0	1	–28
Avanza						0			0	0	–3
Democracy Yes						0			0	0	0
Provincial movements						2			0	2	–4
Total	9,110,884	100.00	15			130			6	151	–
Valid votes	9,110,884	80.91									
Invalid votes	1,040,695	9.24									
Blank votes	1,109,547	9.85									
Total votes	11,261,126	100.00									
Registered voters/turnout	13,732,194	82.01									
Source: CNE

== Presidency ==
For a list of presidents see: List of presidents of the National Assembly of Ecuador.

== See also ==
- National Congress of Ecuador
- Politics of Ecuador
- List of legislatures by country
- Assembly members of the fourth legislative period of the National Assembly of Ecuador
