= List of universities in Ecuador =

Ecuadorian universities

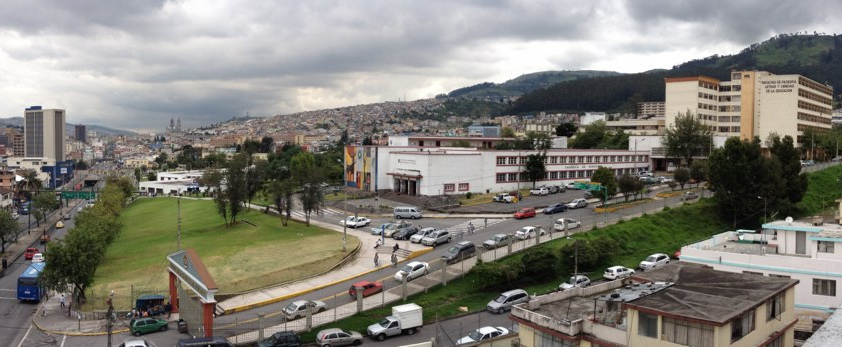
Universidad Central del Ecuador, Quito

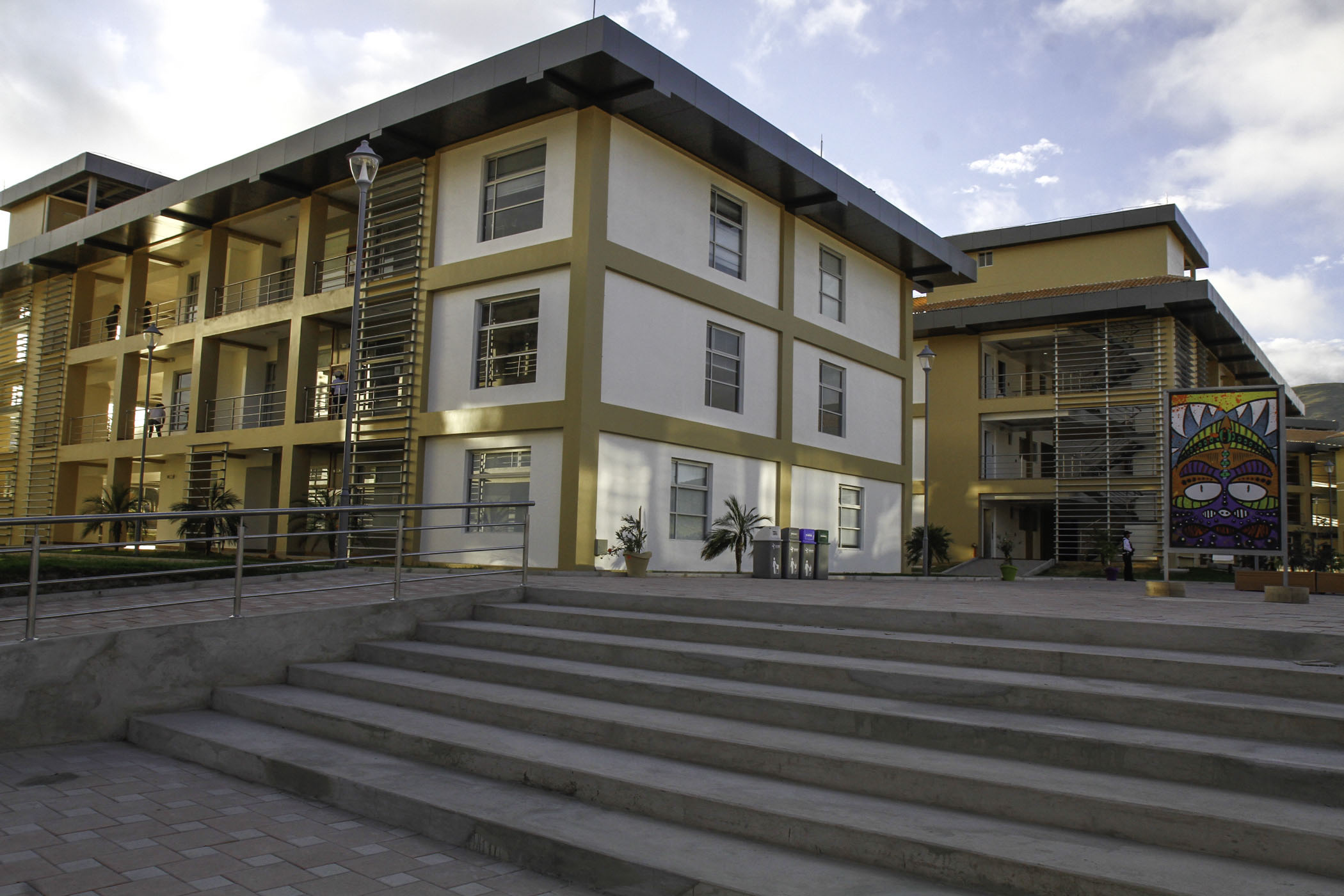
Universidad de Investigación de Tecnología Experimental Yachay, Urcuquí

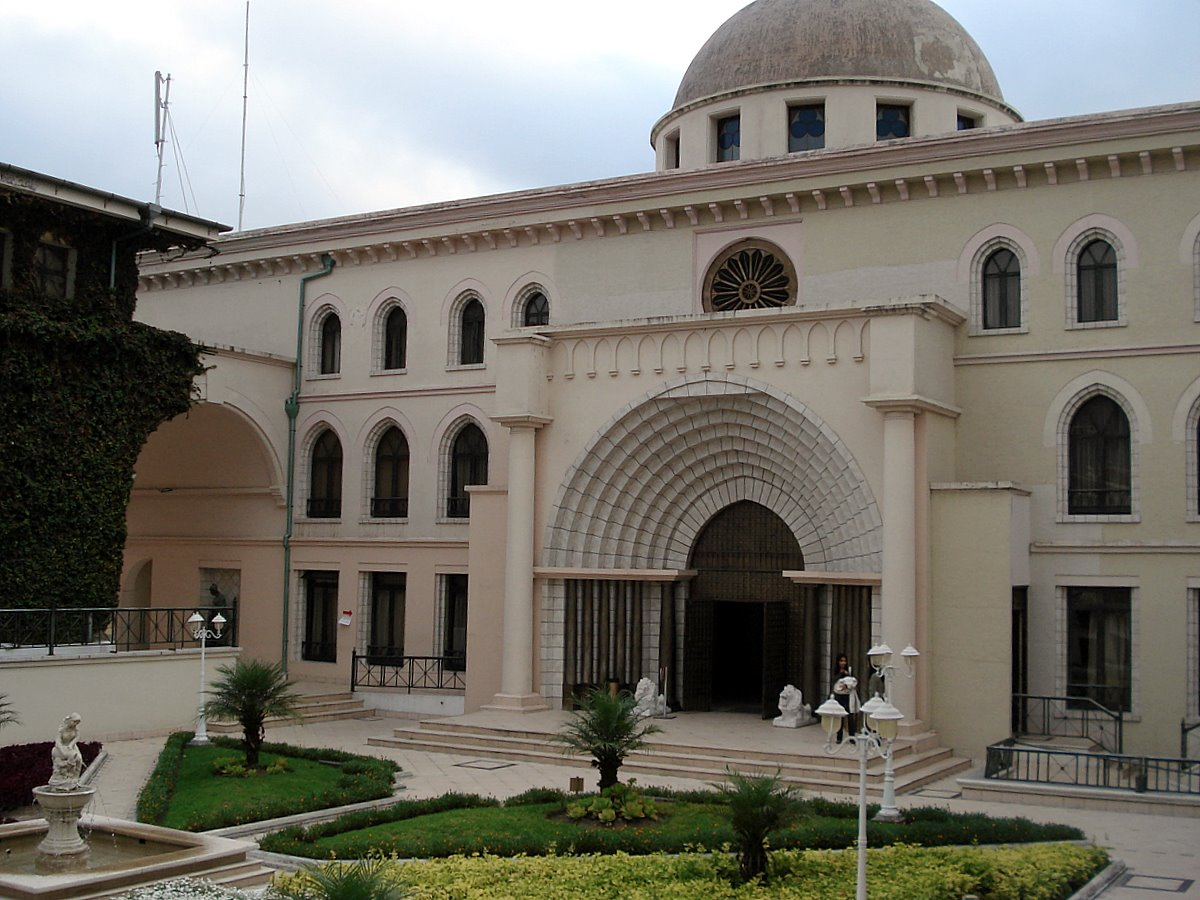
Universidad San Francisco de Quito, Quito

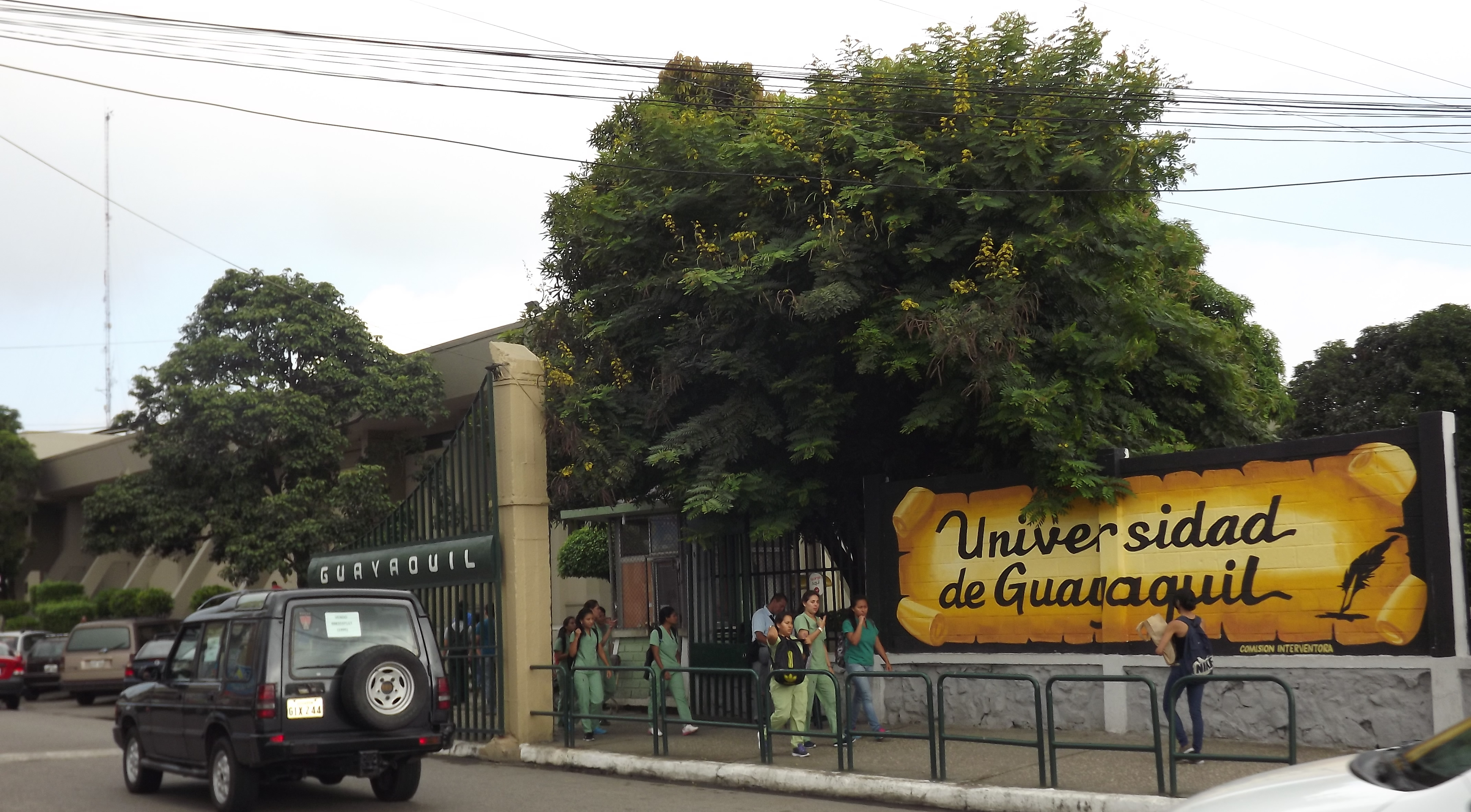
Universidad de Guayaquil, Guayaquil

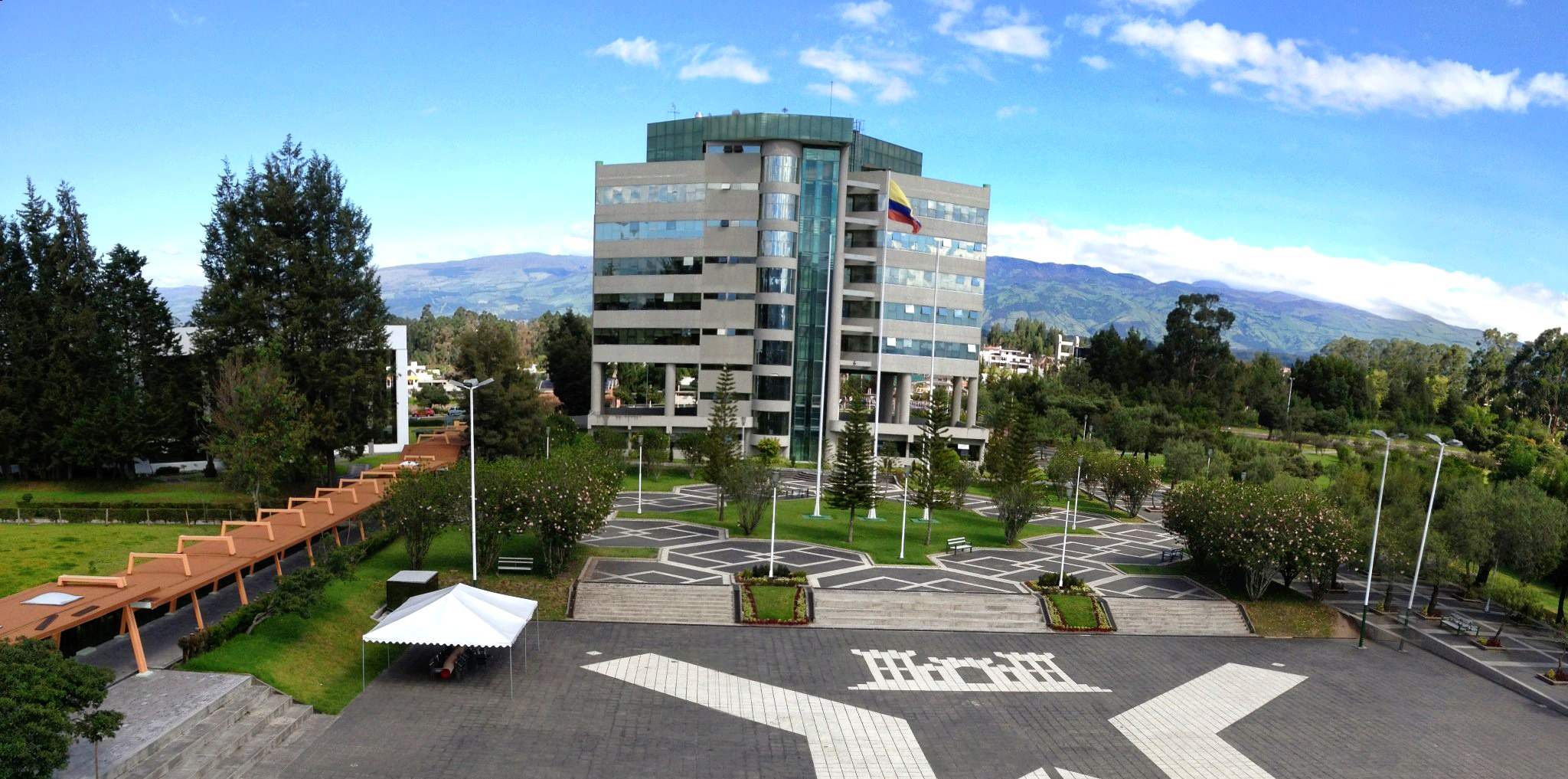
Universidad de las Fuerzas Armadas - ESPE, Sangolquí

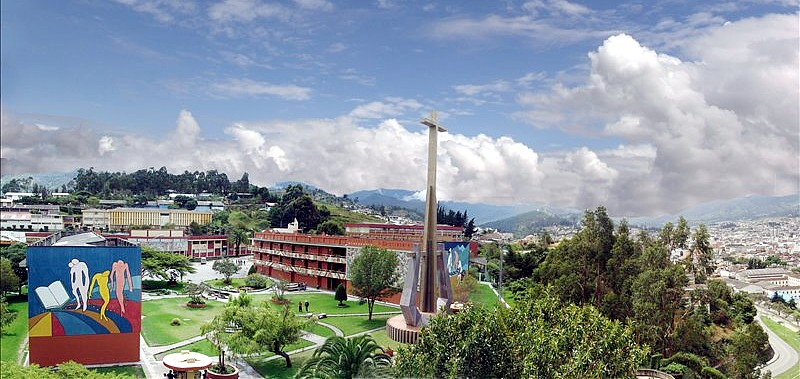
Universidad Técnica Particular de Loja, Loja

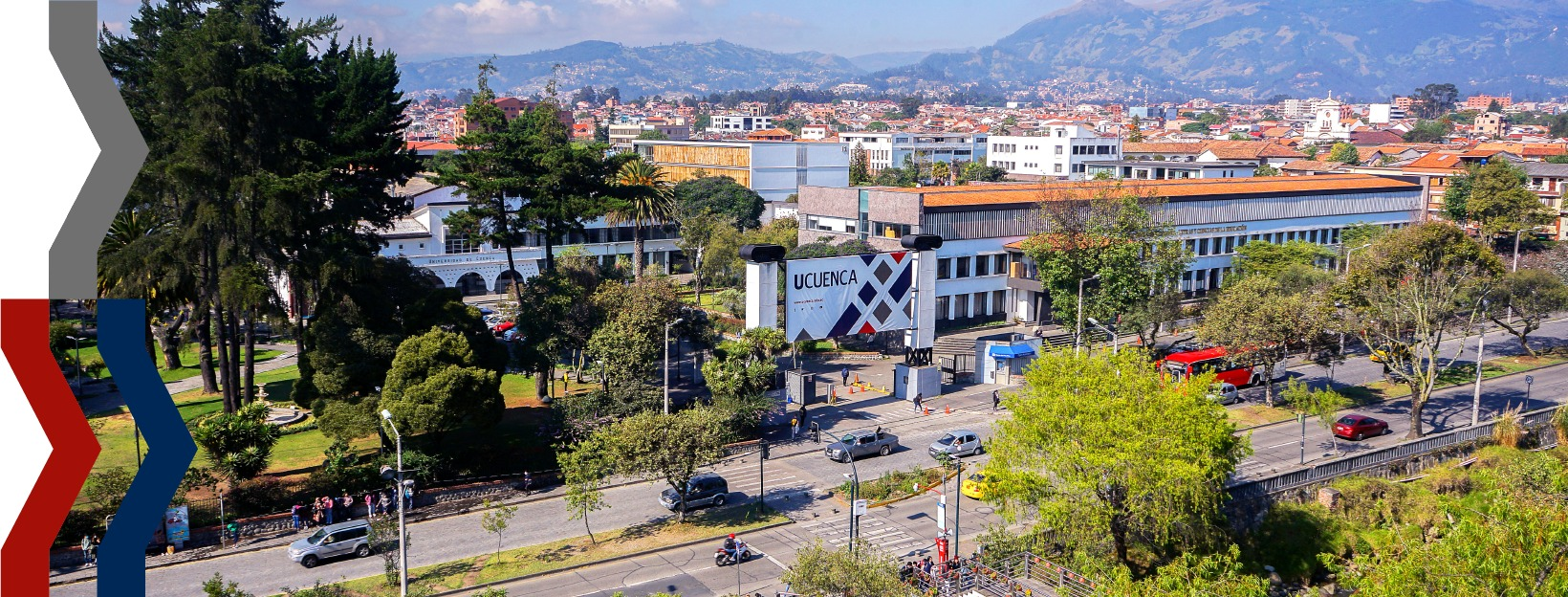
Universidad de Cuenca, Cuenca

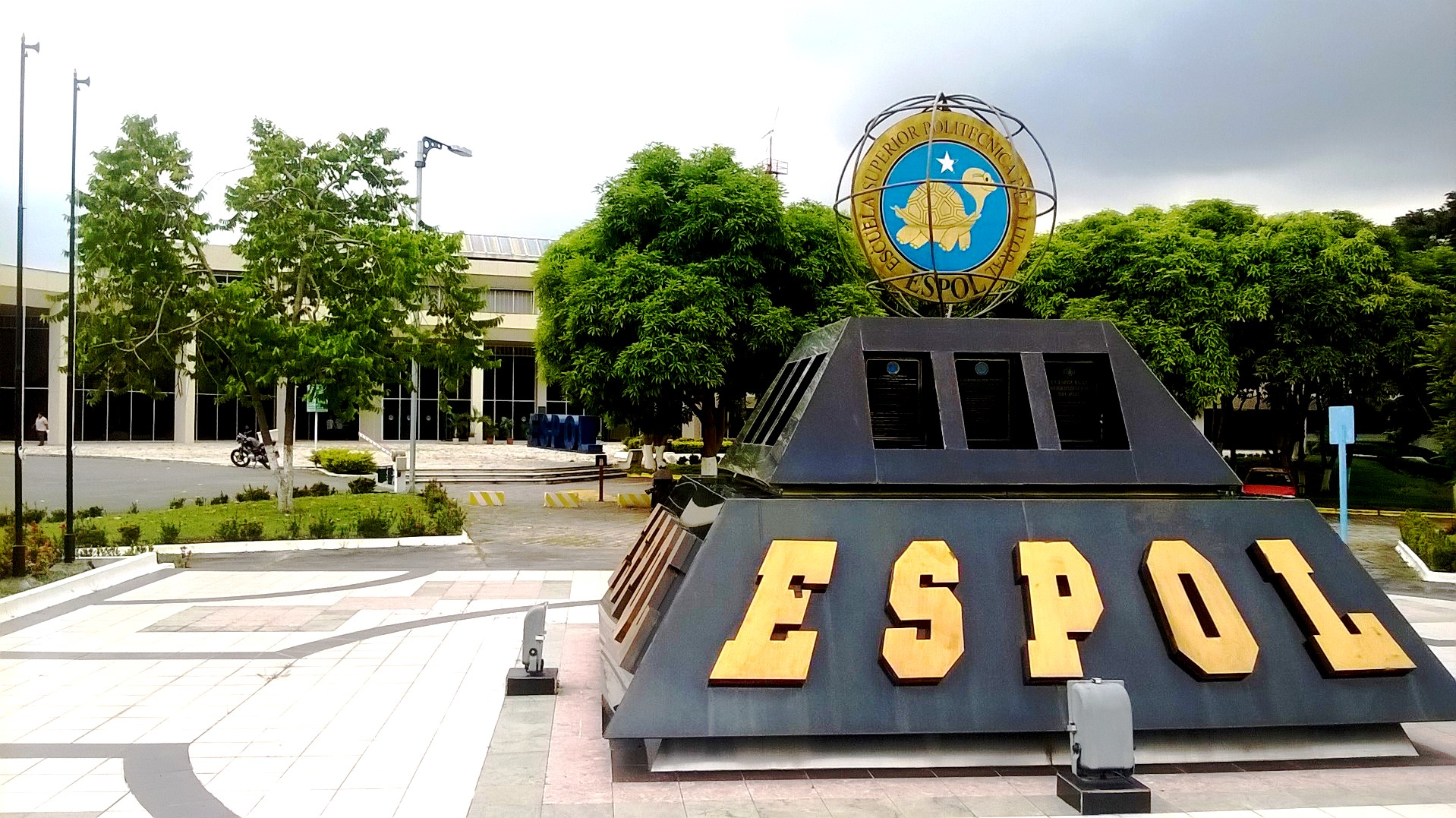
Escuela Superior Politécnica del Litoral, Guayaquil

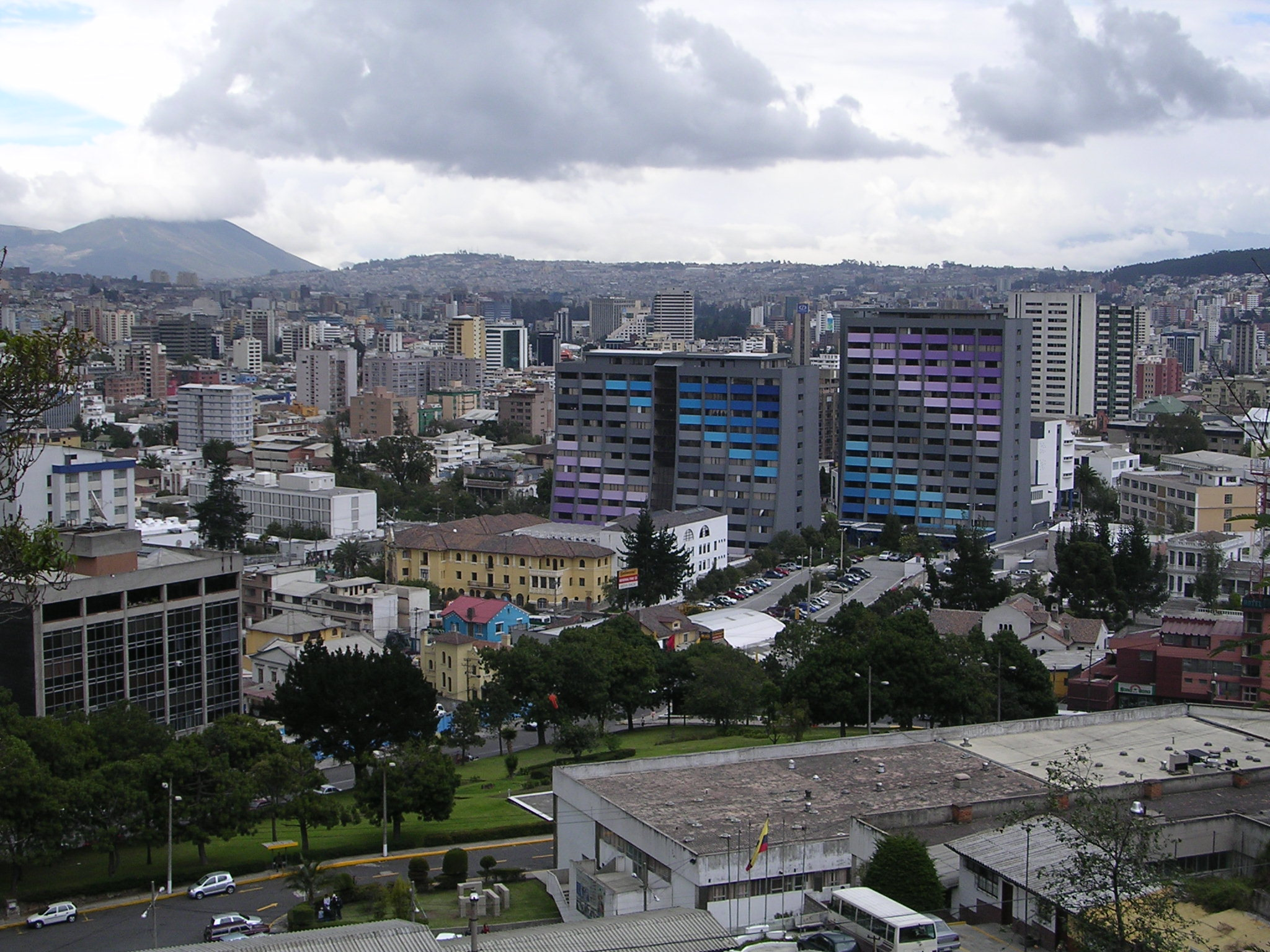
Pontificia Universidad Católica del Ecuador, Quito

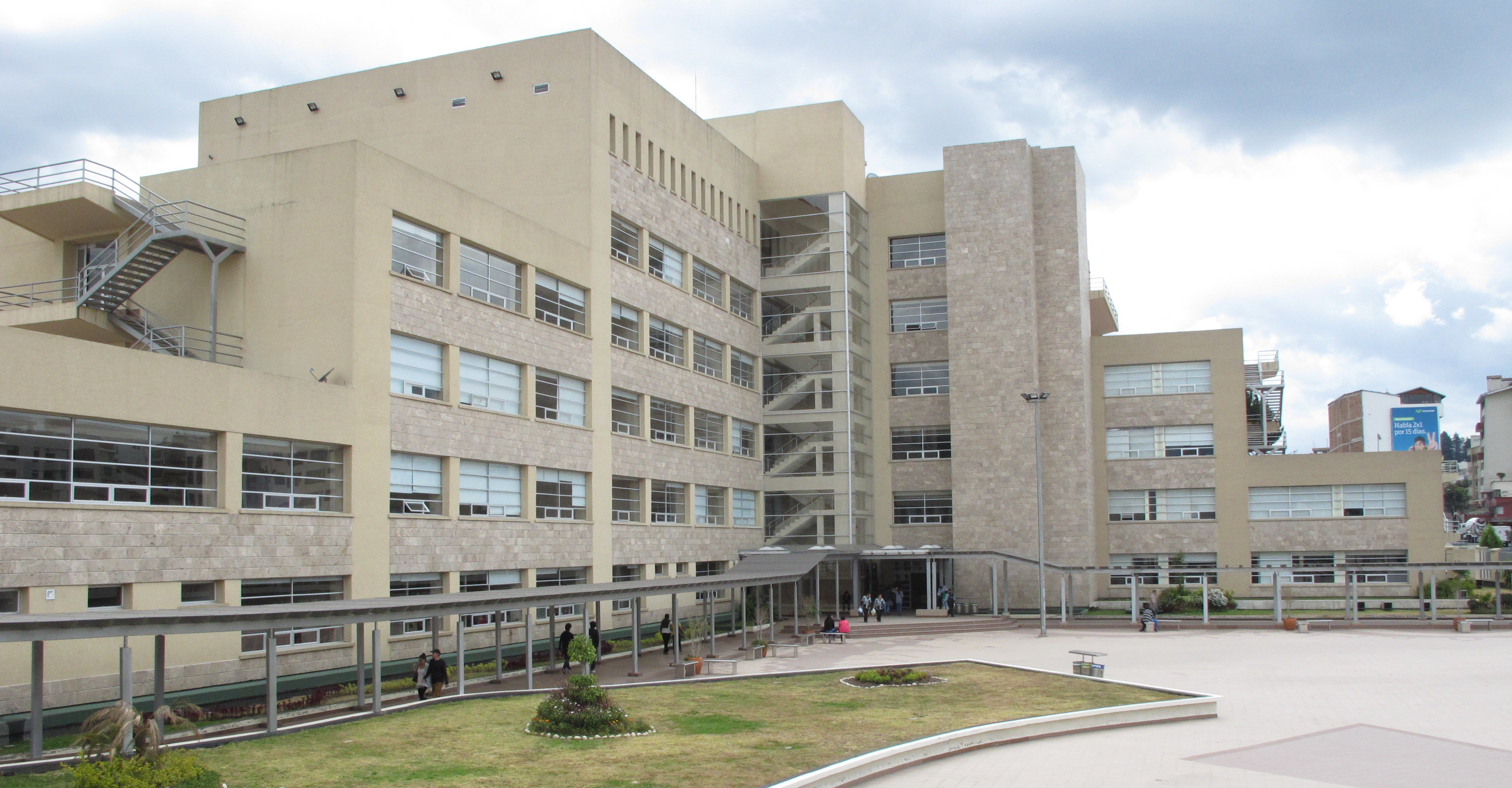
Escuela Politécnica Nacional, Quito

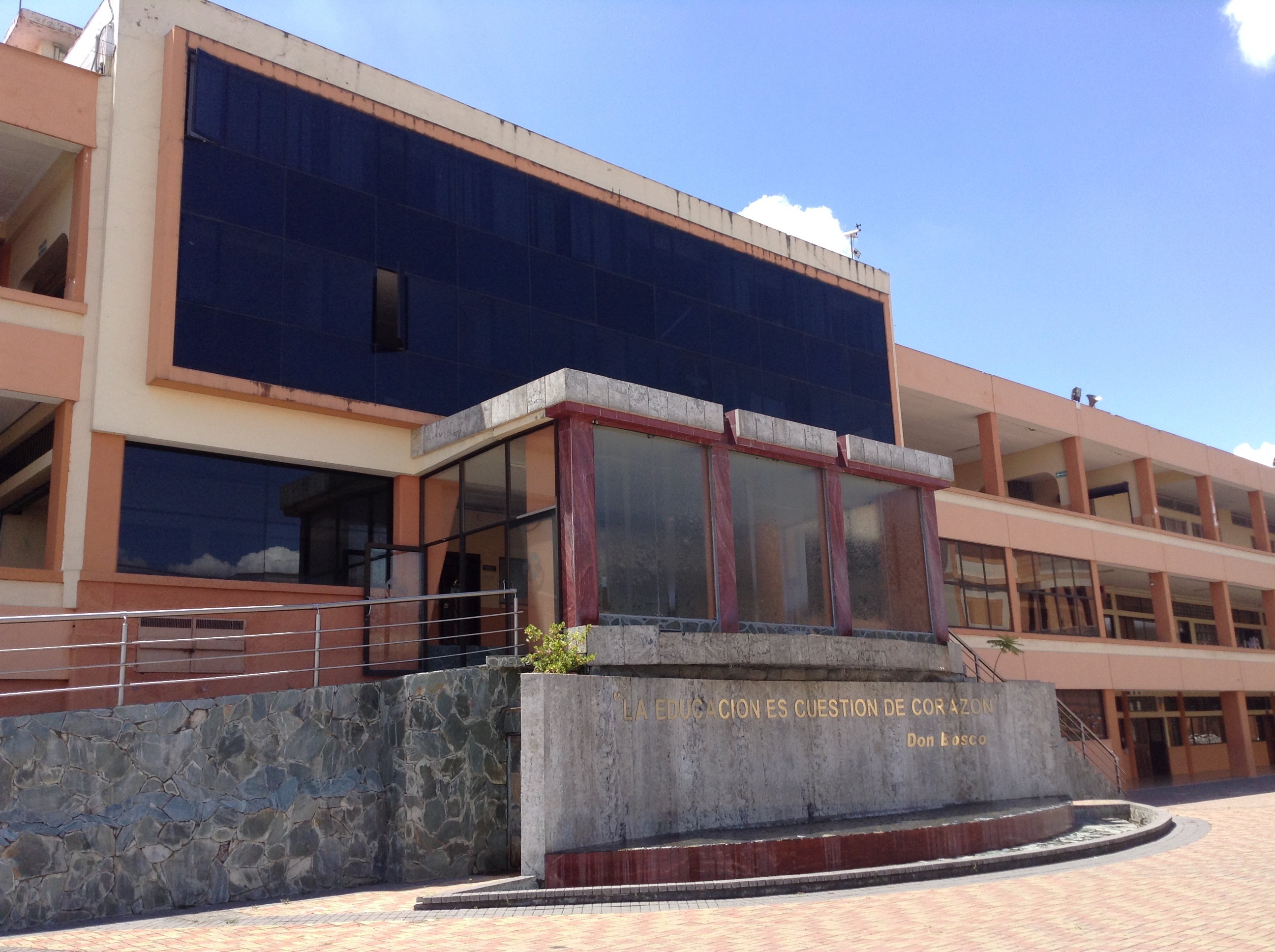
Universidad Politécnica Salesiana, Cuenca

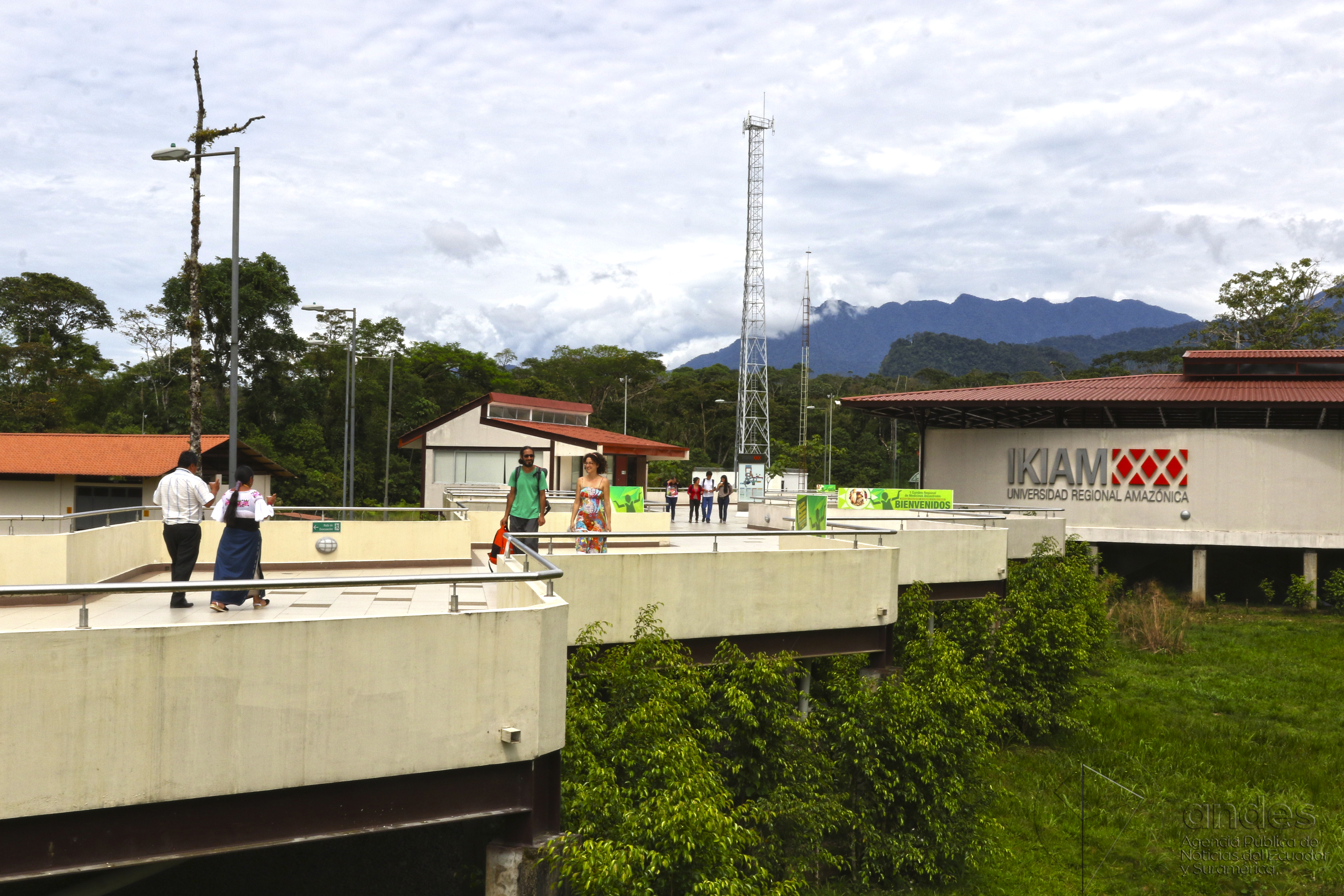
Universidad Regional Amazónica Ikiam, Tena

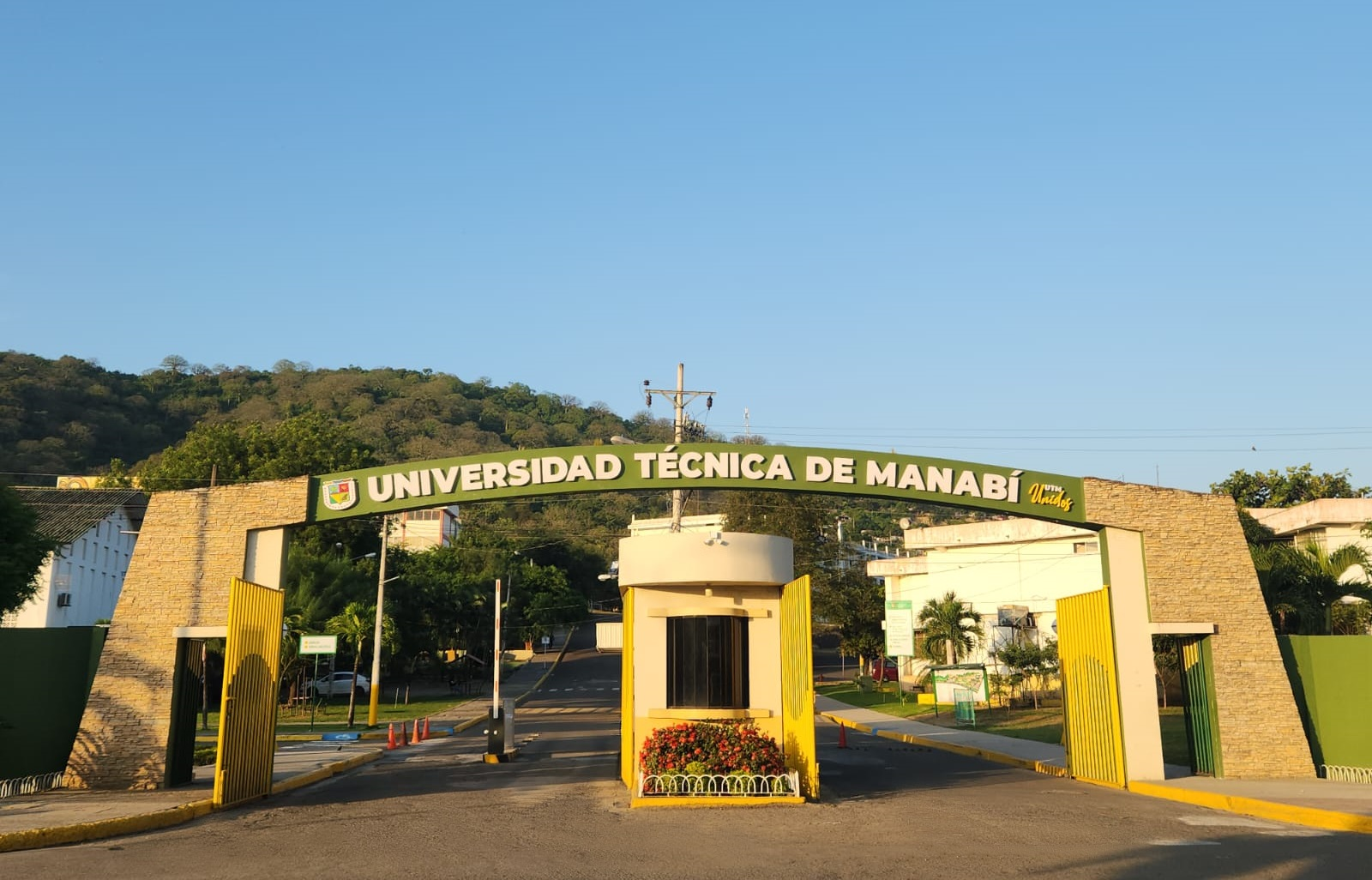
Universidad Técnica de Manabí, Portoviejo

This is a list of universities in Ecuador, including Ecuadorian universities and foreign institutions offering degrees in Ecuador.

The Higher Education Council (CES) of Ecuador is responsible for accrediting as qualified and suitable for teaching at the undergraduate and graduate levels; Ecuadorian Universities will be listed in accordance to their acreditation Status

== Accredited universities ==
=== Universities qualified for graduate and undergraduate studies ===
	Acronym	University	Type	City	Province	Date of Creation
	YACHAY	Universidad de Investigación de Tecnología Experimental Yachay	Public	Urcuquí	Imbabura	December 16, 2013
	EPN	Escuela Politécnica Nacional	Public	Quito	Pichincha	August 27, 1869
	ESPAM	Escuela Superior Politécnica Agropecuaria de Manabí	Public	Calceta	Manabí	April 30, 1999
	ESPOCH	Escuela Superior Politécnica de Chimborazo	Public	Riobamba	Chimborazo	April 18, 1969
	ESPOL	Escuela Superior Politécnica del Litoral	Public	Guayaquil	Guayas	November 11, 1958
	PUCE	Pontificia Universidad Católica del Ecuador	Private	Quito	Pichincha	November 4, 1946
	UAE	Universidad Agraria del Ecuador	Public	Guayaquil	Guayas	July 16, 1992
	UCG	Universidad Casa Grande	Private	Guayaquil	Guayas	June 11, 1999
	UCACUE	Universidad Católica de Cuenca	Private	Cuenca	Azuay	September 7, 1970
	UCSG	Universidad Católica de Santiago de Guayaquil	Private	Guayaquil	Guayas	May 16, 1962
	UCE	Universidad Central del Ecuador	Public	Quito	Pichincha	May 19, 1620
	UARTES	Universidad de las Artes	Public	Guayaquil	Guayas	December 17, 2013
	UNAE	Universidad Nacional de Educación	Public	Azogues	Cañar	December 19, 2013
	IKIAM	Universidad Regional Amazónica Ikiam	Public	Tena	Napo	December 16, 2013
	ESPE	Universidad de las Fuerzas Armadas - ESPE	Public	Sangolquí	Pichincha	June 19, 1922
	UCUENCA	Universidad de Cuenca	Public	Cuenca	Azuay	October 15, 1867
	USFQ	Universidad San Francisco de Quito	Private	Quito	Pichincha	September 1, 1988
	UEES	Universidad de Especialidades Espíritu Santo	Private	Samborondón	Guayas	November 18, 1993
	UDLA	Universidad de las Américas	Private	Quito	Pichincha	November 21, 1995
	UG	Universidad de Guayaquil	Public	Guayaquil	Guayas	May 29, 1897
	UDA	Universidad del Azuay	Private	Cuenca	Azuay	August 9, 1968
Huanuni, Bolivia	UDLH	Universidad de los Hemisferios	Private	Quito	Pichincha	May 20, 2004
	UEA	Universidad Estatal Amazónica	Public	Puyo	Pastaza	October 18, 2002
	UNEMI	Universidad Estatal de Milagro	Public	Milagro	Guayas	February 7, 2001
Huanuni, Bolivia	UNIBE	Universidad Iberoamericana del Ecuador	Private	Quito	Pichincha	May 20, 1994
	UIDE	Universidad Internacional del Ecuador	Private	Quito	Pichincha	October 21, 1992
	UISEK	Universidad Internacional SEK Ecuador	Private	Quito	Pichincha	June 30, 1993
	UNL	Universidad Nacional de Loja	Public	Loja	Loja	December 31, 1859
	UPEC	Universidad Politécnica Estatal del Carchi	Public	Tulcán	Carchi	April 5, 2006
	UPS	Universidad Politécnica Salesiana	Private	Cuenca	Azuay	August 4, 1994
	UTA	Universidad Técnica de Ambato	Public	Ambato	Tunguragua	April 14, 1969
	UTN	Universidad Técnica del Norte	Public	Ibarra	Imbabura	July 18, 1986
	UTMACH	Universidad Técnica de Machala	Public	Machala	El Oro	April 14, 1969
	UTM	Universidad Técnica de Manabí	Public	Portoviejo	Manabí	October 29, 1952
	UTEQ	Universidad Técnica Estatal de Quevedo	Public	Quevedo	Los Ríos	February 1, 1984
	UTPL	Universidad Técnica Particular de Loja	Private	Loja	Loja	May 3, 1971
	UTEG	Universidad Tecnológica Empresarial de Guayaquil	Private	Guayaquil	Guayas	January 31, 2000
	UTE	Universidad UTE	Private	Quito	Pichincha	February 18, 1971
	UTI	Universidad Tecnológica Indoamérica	Private	Ambato	Tunguragua	July 31, 1998
	UPACIFICO	Universidad Del Pacífico	Private	Guayaquil	Guayas	December 18, 1997
	UO	Universidad de Otavalo	Private	Otavalo	Imbabura	December 21, 2002
	UEB	Universidad Estatal de Bolívar	Public	Guaranda	Bolivar	October 22, 1977
	UNESUM	Universidad Estatal del Sur de Manabí	Public	Jipijapa	Manabí	February 7, 2001
	UPSE	Universidad Estatal Península de Santa Elena	Public	La Libertad	Santa Elena	July 22, 1998
	ULEAM	Universidad Laica Eloy Alfaro de Manabí	Public	Manta	Manabí	November 13, 1985
	ULVR	Universidad Laica Vicente Rocafuerte	Private	Guayaquil	Guayas	November 10, 1966
	UMET	Universidad Metropolitana	Private	Guayaquil	Guayas	May 2, 2000
	UNACH	Universidad Nacional de Chimborazo	Public	Riobamba	Chimborazo	August 31, 1995
	UNIANDES	Universidad Regional Autónoma de los Andes	Private	Ambato	Tungurahua	February 20, 1997
	USGP	Universidad San Gregorio de Portoviejo	Private	Portoviejo	Manabí	December 14, 2000
	UTC	Universidad Técnica de Cotopaxi	Public	Latacunga	Cotopaxi	January 24, 1995
	UISRAEL	Universidad Tecnológica Israel	Private	Quito	Pichincha	November 20, 1999
	ECOTEC	Universidad Tecnológica Ecotec	Private	Samborondón	Guayas	December 18, 2006

=== Graduate universities ===
Acronym	University	Type	City	Province	Date of Creation
FLACSO	Facultad Latinoamericana de Ciencias Sociales	Public	Quito	Pichincha	October 28, 1975
UASB	Universidad Andina Simón Bolívar	Public	Quito	Pichincha	July 24, 1992
IAEN	Instituto de Altos Estudios Nacionales	Public	Quito	Pichincha	May 20, 1972

== Universities awaiting accreditation ==
Acronym	University	Type	City	Province	Date of Creation
UBE	Universidad Bolivariana del Ecuador	Private	Durán	Ecuador	May 14, 2021
UDET	Universidad de Especialidades Turísticas	Privada	Quito	Ecuador	March 14, 2000
UDR	Universidad Del Río	Private	Guayaquil	Ecuador	December 6, 2018
UAW	Universidad Intercultural de las Nacionalidades y Pueblos Indígenas Amawtay Wasi	Public	Quito	Ecuador	August 2, 2018
UTB	Universidad Técnica de Babahoyo	Public	Babahoyo	Ecuador	October 8, 1971
UTE-LVT	Universidad Técnica Luis Vargas Torres	Public	Esmeraldas	Ecuador	May 9, 1970

== Foreign universities and business schools operating In Ecuador ==
Acronym	University	Type	Methodology	Country of origin	Date of Original Offer in Ecuador
GU	Global University	Private	Formal Education & Online	United States	February 7, 2000
BC	Broward College	Private	Formal Education	United States	January 7, 2007
ADEN	Aden University	Private	Online	Panama	March 4, 2010
ITAérea	IT Aeronautical Business School	Private	Formal Education & Online	Spain	March 5, 2014
UNIR	Universidad Internacional de La Rioja	Private	Online	Spain	July 1, 2016
Nebrija	Universidad Nebrija	Private	Online	Spain	June 22, 2018
TEC	Tecnológico de Monterrey	Private	Online	Mexico	March 21, 2019
EUDE	EUDE Business School	Private	Online	Spain	July 21, 2019
UTEL	Universidad Tecnológica Latinoamericana en Línea	Private	Online	Mexico	July 15, 2020
Uk	Universidad Kuepa	Private	Online	Mexico	March 28, 2021
MBTU	Miami Business Technological University	Private	Online	United States	May 16, 2021
UGR	Universidad del Gran Rosario	Private	Online	Argentina	October 12, 2021
IMF	IMF Global University	Private	Online	Spain	October 15, 2021
UIIX	Universidad de Investigación e Innovación de México	Private	Online	Mexico	August 29, 2022
EAN	Universidad EAN	Private	Online	Colombia	January 31, 2023
UE	Universidad Europea	Private	Online	Spain	May 17, 2023
CUF	Continental University of Florida	Private	Online	United States	June 8, 2023

== Closed universities ==
The following universities have ceased operations in Ecuador.

Acronym	University	Type	City	Province	Date of Creation	Date of Closure
ESPEA	Escuela Superior Politécnica Ecológica Amazónica	Private	Tena	Ecuador	September 30, 1997	April 12, 2012 (Closed) August 2, 2016 (Extinguished)
ESPOJ	Escuela Politécnica Javeriana	Privada	Quito	Pichincha	November 29, 1995	April 12, 2012 (Closed) June 2, 2017 (Extinguished)
UNAQ	Universidad Autónoma de Quito	Private	Quito	Pichincha	July 7, 1999	April 12, 2012 (Closed) August 2, 2016 (Extinguished)
UCC	Universidad Cooperativa de Colombia	Private	Quevedo	Los Ríos	August 10, 1998	December 19, 2001
UCL	Universidad Cristiana Latinoamericana	Private	Quito	Pichincha	March 31, 2000	April 12, 2012 (Closed) August 2, 2016 (Extinguished)
UI	Universidad Intercontinental	Public	Quito	Pichincha	May 18, 1992	April 12, 2012 (Closed) August 2, 2016 (Extinguished)
UAPG	Universidad Alfredo Pérez Guerrero	Private	Quito	Pichincha	January 15, 2001	April 12, 2012 (Closed) August 2, 2016 (Extinguished)
UPAC	Universidad Panamericana de Cuenca	Private	Cuenca	Azuay	June 25, 2004	April 12, 2012 (Closed) August 2, 2016 (Extinguished)
UNIDEC	Universidad Interamericana del Ecuador	Private	Riobamba	Chimborazo	October 31, 2006	April 12, 2012 (Closed) August 2, 2016 (Extinguished)
UOMQ	Universidad Og Mandino de Quito	Private	Quito	Pichincha	November 27, 2005	April 12, 2012 (Closed) August 2, 2016 (Extinguished)
UTSAM	Universidad Tecnológica San Antonio de Machala	Private	Quito	Pichincha	June 15, 1999	April 12, 2012 (Closed) August 2, 2016 (Extinguished)
UTA	Universidad Tecnológica América	Private	Quito	Pichincha	August 20, 1997	April 12, 2012 (Closed) August 2, 2016 (Extinguished)
UE	Universitas Ecuatorialis	Private	Quito	Pichincha	December 27, 2002	April 12, 2012 (Closed) August 2, 2016 (Extinguished)
UE	Escuela Superior Politécnica Ecológica Prof. Servio Tulio Montero Ludeña	Private	Quito	Pichincha	August 20, 1997	April 12, 2012 (Closed) August 2, 2016 (Extinguished)
UE	Universidad Técnica Particular de Ciencias Ambientales José Peralta	Private	Quito	Pichincha	July 31, 1998	April 12, 2012 (Closed) August 2, 2016 (Extinguished)
UJ	Universidad Jefferson	Private	Guayaquil	Guayas	July 31, 1998	April 29, 2005 (Closed) August 28, 2008 (Extinguished)
