= Paleontological Museum Megatherium =

Paleontological museum in Ecuador

Coordinates: 2.23216°S 80.87804°W

The Paleontological Museum Megatherium (Spanish: Museo Paleontológico Megaterio) is a museum in the province of Santa Elena in Ecuador, located in the Universidad Estatal Península de Santa Elena. It is considered the first museum of paleontology in Ecuador. The museum presents an exhibition on the remains of Late Pleistocene (50,000–8,000 BCE) megafauna found in the Tanque Loma sector of La Libertad Canton, one of the sites of the most important fossils in South America.

== Exhibition ==
The exhibition displays megafauna fossils dating back 17,000 years that were found in the Tanque Loma sector. Included are the fossils of the terrestrial giant sloth Eremotherium and many other mammals of considerable size, as well as members of the genera Amerhippus, Notiomastodon, and other animals like turtles, birds, invertebrates Etc .There are older fossils such as dolphins, whales, sharks, and a primitive whale, There are also pieces of petrified wood dating back to the Paleocene.
