= Nino Cassanello =

Ecuadorian professor and physician (1945–2020)

Nino Antonio Cassanello Layana (12 January 1945 – 26 March 2020) was an Ecuadorian university professor and doctor.

== Biography ==
Cassanello completed his high school studies at the San José La Salle college, after which he attended university and graduated as an internist doctor. He worked at the Luis Vernaza hospital in Guayaquil for forty years; at the same time, he was a professor at the University of Guayaquil and at the Universidad Católica de Santiago de Guayaquil. He was the author of a book on medical semiology and several scientific articles in the Revista Médica de Nuestros Hospitales of the Board of Charity of Guayaquil.

From an early age Cassanello was fond of horse riding, a hobby he inherited from his father Don Nino Cassanello Zerega; he owned several racehorses from the “Santa Mónica” and “Los Pelados” stables. The Miguel Salem Dibo racetrack held several equestrian classics in his name.

== Death ==
Cassanello died on 26 March 2020, aged 75, of COVID-19 in Guayaquil, during the pandemic in Ecuador.
