= Universidad Estatal Península de Santa Elena =

Public university of Ecuador

Coordinates: 2.18341°S 79.89576°W

Universidad Estatal Peninsula de Santa Elena
- State University Santa Elena Peninsula
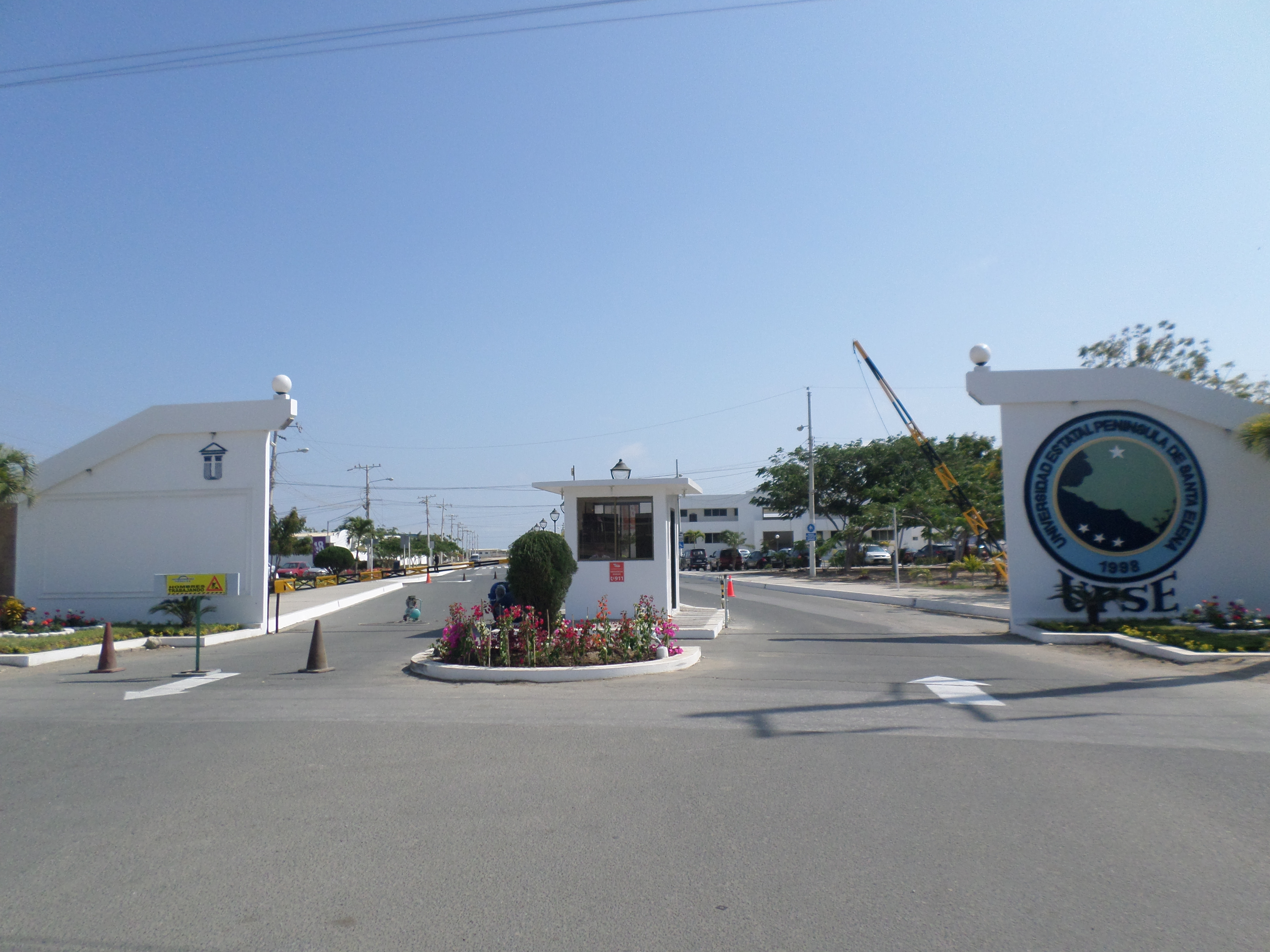
- Type: Public, national
- Established: 1998; 28 years ago
- Rector: Ph.D Johnny Chavarria Viteri
- Location: La Libertad Canton, Santa Elena Province, Ecuador
- Nickname: UPSE
- Website: /http://www.upse.edu.ec/
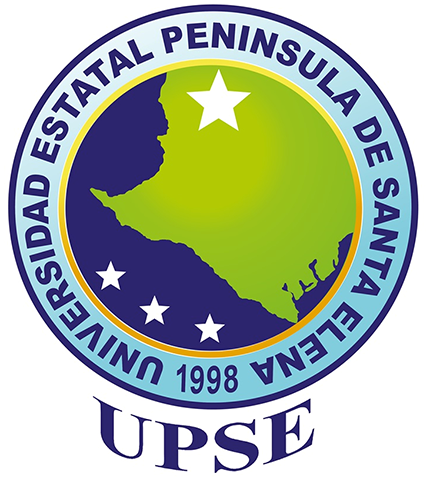

The State University Santa Elena Peninsula (Spanish: Universidad Estatal Península de Santa Elena, - literal translation: State University Santa Elena Peninsula, UPSE) is a public university located in the canton freedom of the province of Santa Elena in the Republic of Ecuador, is the first autonomous center of teaching and which has the largest student population in the area.

Currently the UPSE is accredited in the System of Higher Education, ranking in category C, according to the assessment made by the Board of Evaluation, Accreditation and Quality Assurance in Higher Education (CEAACES)

== History ==
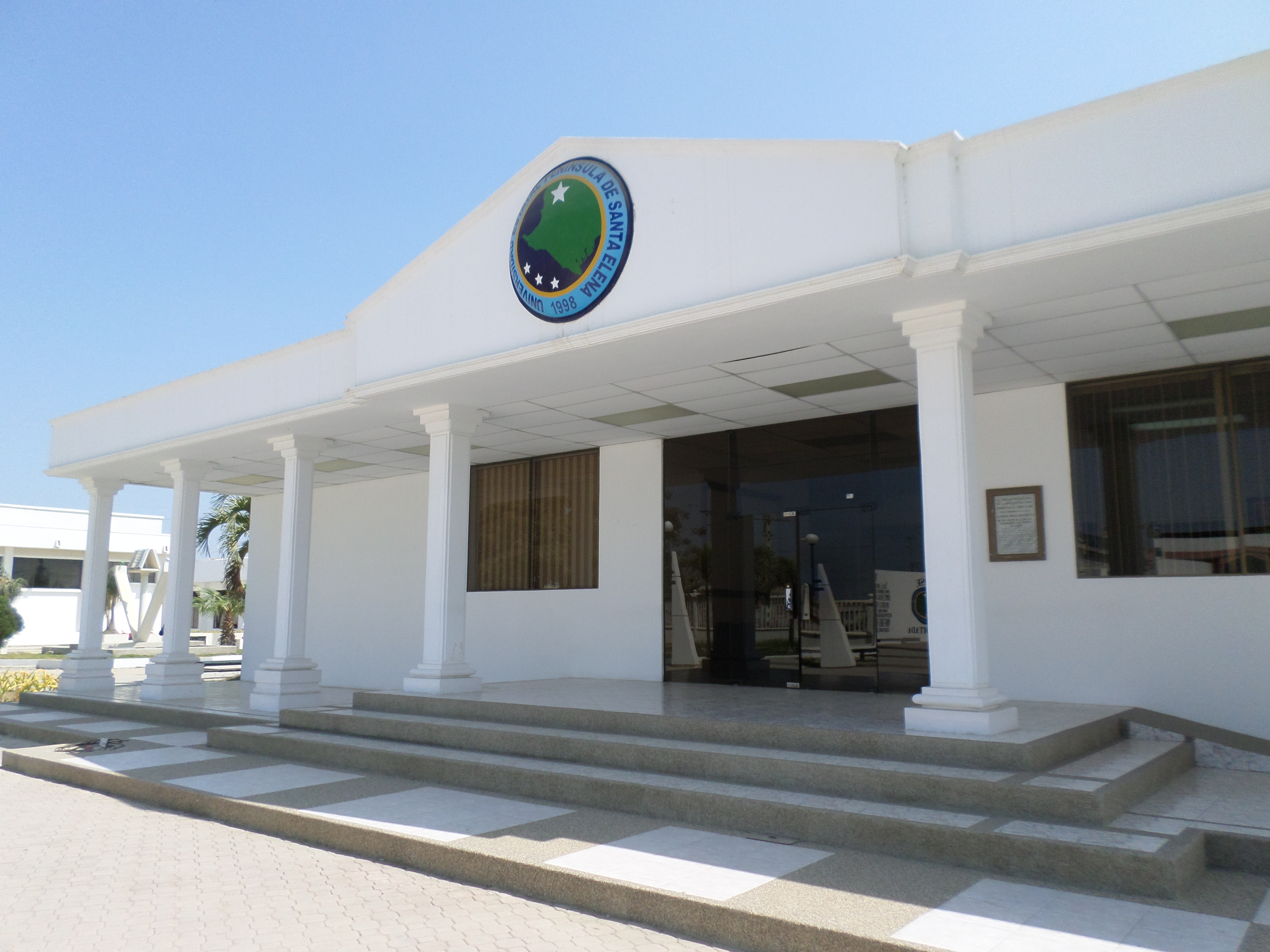
Edificio de Rectorado

From 1984 to 1994 the municipalities of Salinas and Santa Elena and various civic institutions took steps in an attempt to institutionalize Higher Education in the Santa Elena Peninsula, achieving the operation of the University Extension University of Guayaquil in the areas Industrial Engineering with Industrial Technology Program; Arts, Business Administration and Languages.

On November 6, 1997 was again presented the Project, It is approved by the National Congress on 1 and 2 July 1998, with some reforms such as decreased academic faculties, participation of the University of Guayaquil in the initial organization of the University created and the highlight the name change in the original project consisted University of the Pacific in Santa Elena Peninsula, the State University Santa Elena Peninsula. Finally on July 17, 1998, Dr. Fabián Alarcón Interim President of the Republic of Ecuador signed the execute Law No. 110, and that promulgated in the Official Gazette Supplement # 366 of July 22, 1998.

== List of schools ==
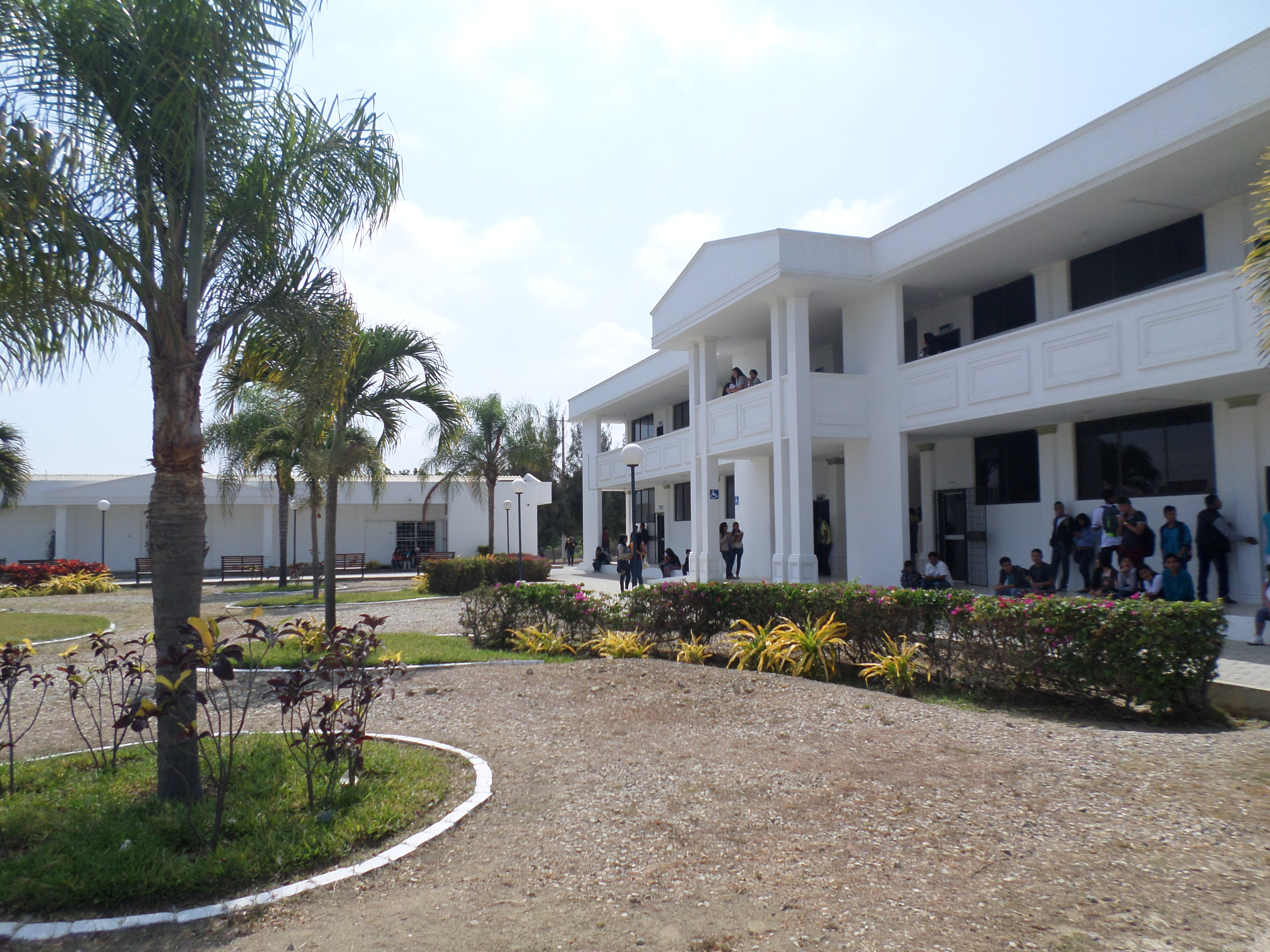
Facultad de ciencias agrarias

- School of Administrative Sciences
- School of Agricultural Sciences
- School of Science Education and Languages
- School of Engineering Sciences
- School of Marine Sciences
- School of Social Sciences and Health
- School of Systems and Telecommunications
- School of Industrial engineer

== Masters ==
- Masters in Business Administration Mention Management of SMEs
- Master of Human Resource Management
- Masters in Sustainable Tourism Management Mention in Tourist Destinations

== Institute for Scientific Research and Technological Development ==
The Institute for Scientific Research and Technological Development, UPSE, established by Resolution No. 005 of the H. University Council at its meeting on June 7, 2006, is a company which drives scientific and technological development in the province. This institute is involved in aplicciones management and magazine publishing, management of virtual training and institutional mail.

Research centers

- Center for Environmental comprehensive studies
- Center for Agricultural Research
- Biological Research Center
- Geoscience Research Center

== Megatherium Paleontology Museum ==
A small museum presenting South American megafauna fossil remains is located on the university campus.

== See also ==
- List of universities in Ecuador
