= University San Gregorio de Portoviejo =

- University San Gregorio de Portoviejo
- Type: Private university
- Rector: Dra. Ximena Guillén Vivas, DDS. MSc. PhD.
- Location: Portoviejo, Manabí Province, Ecuador; 1°3′50″S 80°28′13″W
- Campus: Portoviejo
- Colors: Maroon And Yellow
- Website: sangregorio.edu.ec (in Spanish)

The University San Gregorio de Portoviejo also known as USGP, is an autonomous institution with social and public purposes and can provide education, conduct research with scientific freedom - administrative, and participate in national development plans, grant, recognize and validate academic degrees and professional qualifications, and generally perform the activities to achieve its goals.

== History ==
The University of San Gregorio Portoviejo, located in the city of Portoviejo, capital of the province of Manabi was established by Legislative Decree # 2000-33, dated 14 December 2000 on the structure of the Secular University "Vicente Rocafuerte" of Guayaquil, Portoviejo extension, which began operating from May 20, 1968.

== See also ==
- List of universities in Ecuador
