= Universidad del Azuay =

Ecuadorian university

University of Azuay
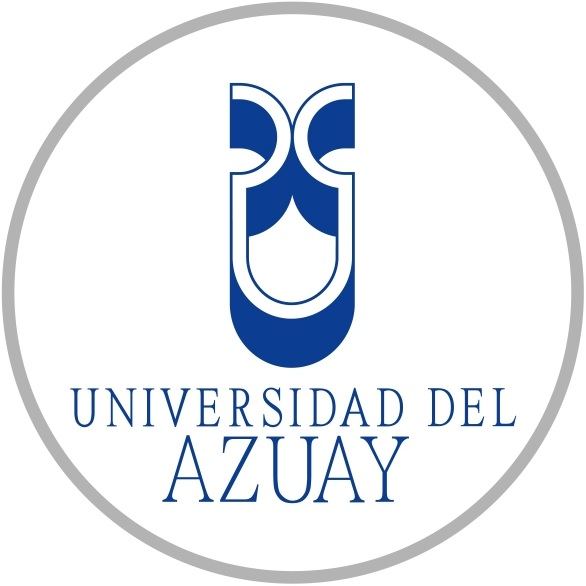
- Type: Private university co-financed by the state
- Established: 1968; 58 years ago
- Chancellor: Francisco Salgado Arteaga
- Vice-Chancellor: Marta Cobos Cali (Academic) Jacinto Guillén García (Research)
- Location: Avenue 24 de Mayo and Hernán Malo, Cuenca (Ecuador), Ecuador; 2.9189369°S 78.999979°W
- Campus: Urban
- Nickname: UDA
- Website: uazuay.edu.ec

The University of Azuay (UDA) is an Ecuadorian university located in the Province of Azuay, its campus are in the city of Cuenca and in the parish of Baños.

The university was founded in 1968 as part of the Universidad Católica de Santiago de Guayaquil in the city of Cuenca under the name of the "Institute of Philosophy and Educational Sciences". It was authorized by the Holy See in May 1969.

The Institute began its activities in the 1968–1969 academic year, the founding professors were Francisco Olmedo Llorente, Claudio Malo González, Carlos Pérez Agustí, Rafael Galiana, José Castelví Queralt and Nelson Yánez Ortega. The first cohort had around sixty students, but not all of them graduated.

The priest Agustín López Canessa became the first director of the institute, he was delegated by the Archbishop of Cuenca.

In December 1970, the School of Accounting was founded and the institute was renamed as Universidad Católica Santiago de Guayaquil in Cuenca. Claudio Malo González was named as Academic Director.

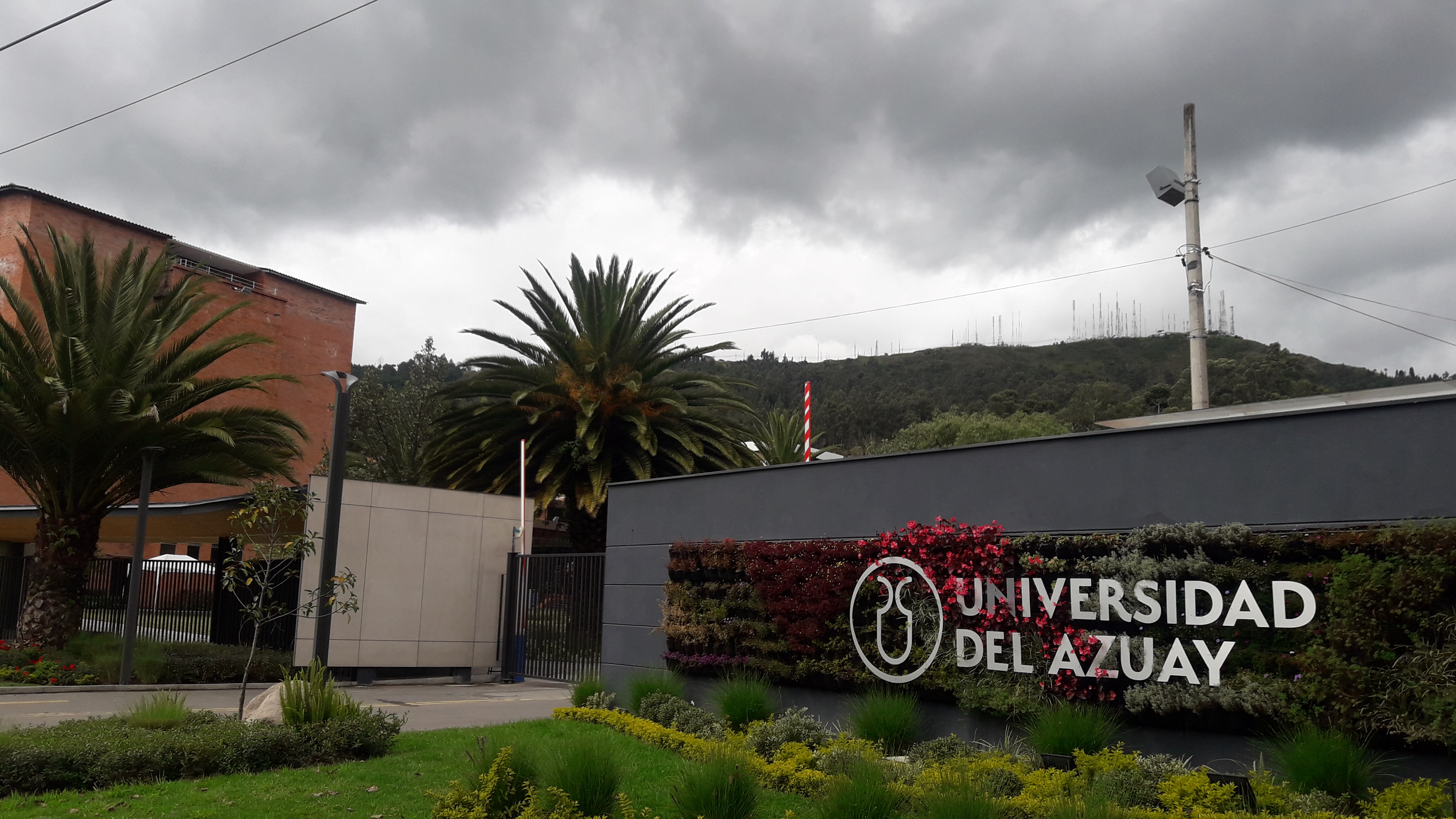
Universidad del Azuay

Later, the two academic departments of the Universidad Católica de Santiago de Guayaquil in Cuenca (the Institute of Philosophy and Educational Sciences and the School of Accounting) requested their annexation to the Pontificia Universidad Católica del Ecuador, which took place in November 1976, which led the academic units to become the Faculty of Philosophy, Letters and Education Sciences and the Faculty of Accounting and Administration Sciences, respectively. In 1990, after meeting all the legal requirements, it was renamed as Universidad del Azuay, being its current name. Nowadays, the university has incorporated six Faculties and more than 20 careers.

== Faculties and Schools ==
Faculty of Administration Sciences

- Business Administration
- Accounting and Auditing
- Economics
- Engineering in Computer Science
- Marketing

Faculty of Legal Sciences

- Law
- International Studies

Faculty of Science and Technology

- Biology
- Civil Engineering
- Production Engineering
- Electronic Engineering
- Food Engineering
- Engineering in Automotive Mechanics
- Mining Engineering
- Environmental Engineering

Faculty of Design, Architecture and Art

- Architecture
- Theatre
- Interior Design
- Product Design
- Graphic Design
- Textile Design

Faculty of Philosophy, Letters and Education Sciences

- Communication
- Basic Education
- Initial Education
- Clinical Psychology
- Educational Psychology
- Organizational Psychology
- Tourism

Faculty of Medicine

- Medicine

Since 2012, the university is member of the Ecuadorian Network for Research and Postgraduate Studies.

== Rectors of Universidad del Azuay ==
Rectors of Universidad del Azuay
Name	Start of administration	End of administration
Juan Cordero Íñiguez	1990	1992
Mario Jaramillo Paredes	1992	2012
Carlos Cordero Díaz	2012	2017
Francisco Salgado Arteaga	2017	Present

== See also ==
- List of universities in Ecuador
- Universidad de Cuenca
- Education in Ecuador
