= Paúl Granda =

Ecuadorian politician

Paúl Andrés Granda López
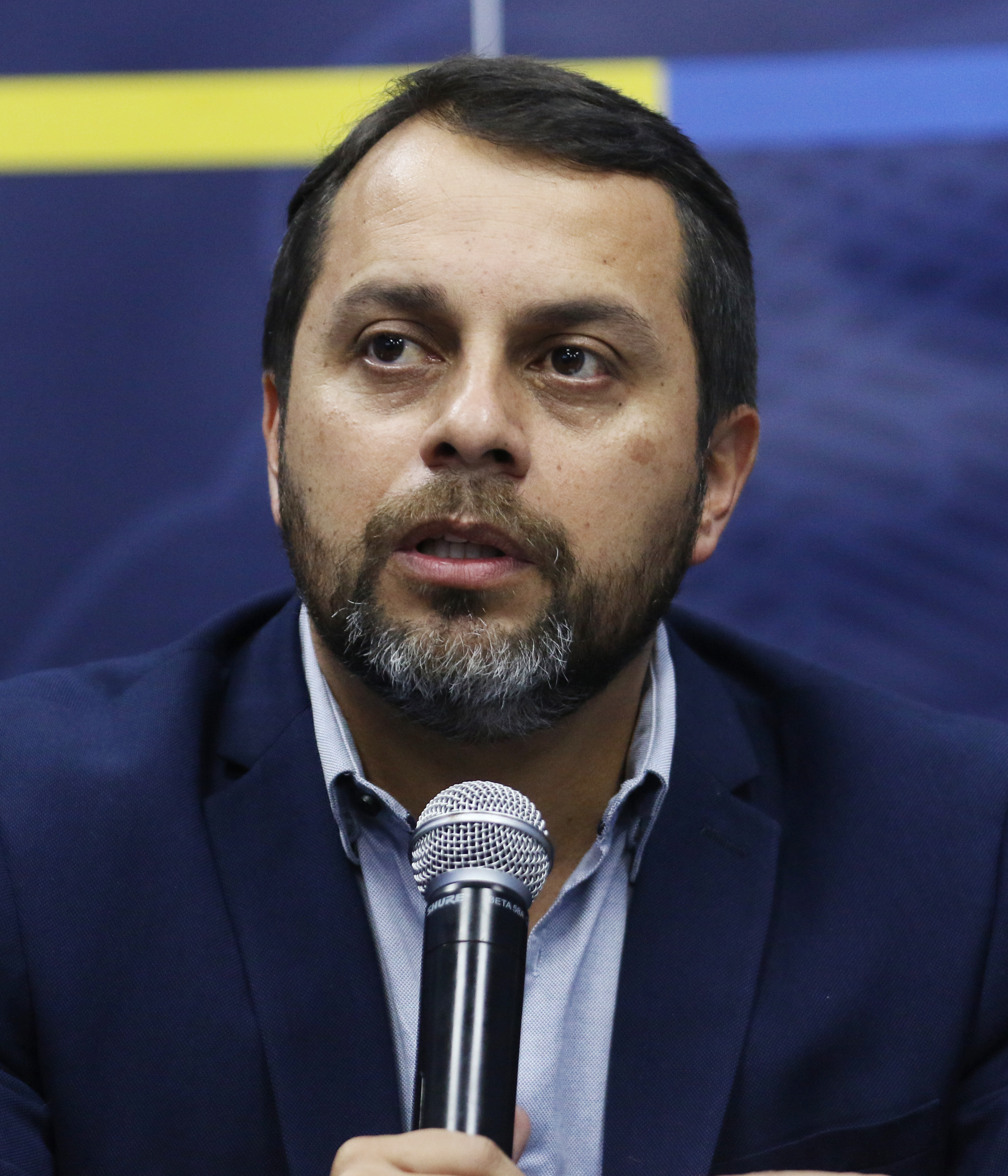
- Born: 1972 (age 53–54); Cuenca, Ecuador
- Occupation: Lawyer

National Secretary of Public Administration
- In office May 2018 – Dec 2018
- President: Lenin Moreno
- Preceded by: Miguel Carvajal
- Succeeded by: María Paula Romo

Minister of Transportation and Public Works
- In office May 2017 – May 2018
- President: Lenin Moreno
- Preceded by: Boris Córdova González
- Succeeded by: Boris Palacios

Mayor of Cuenca
- In office 31 Jul 2009 – 14 May 2014
- Preceded by: Marcelo Cabrera
- Succeeded by: Marcelo Cabrera

Paúl Andrés Granda López (born in Cuenca on 19 September 1972) is an Ecuadorian politician who occupied the mayorship of Cuenca between 2009 and 2014.

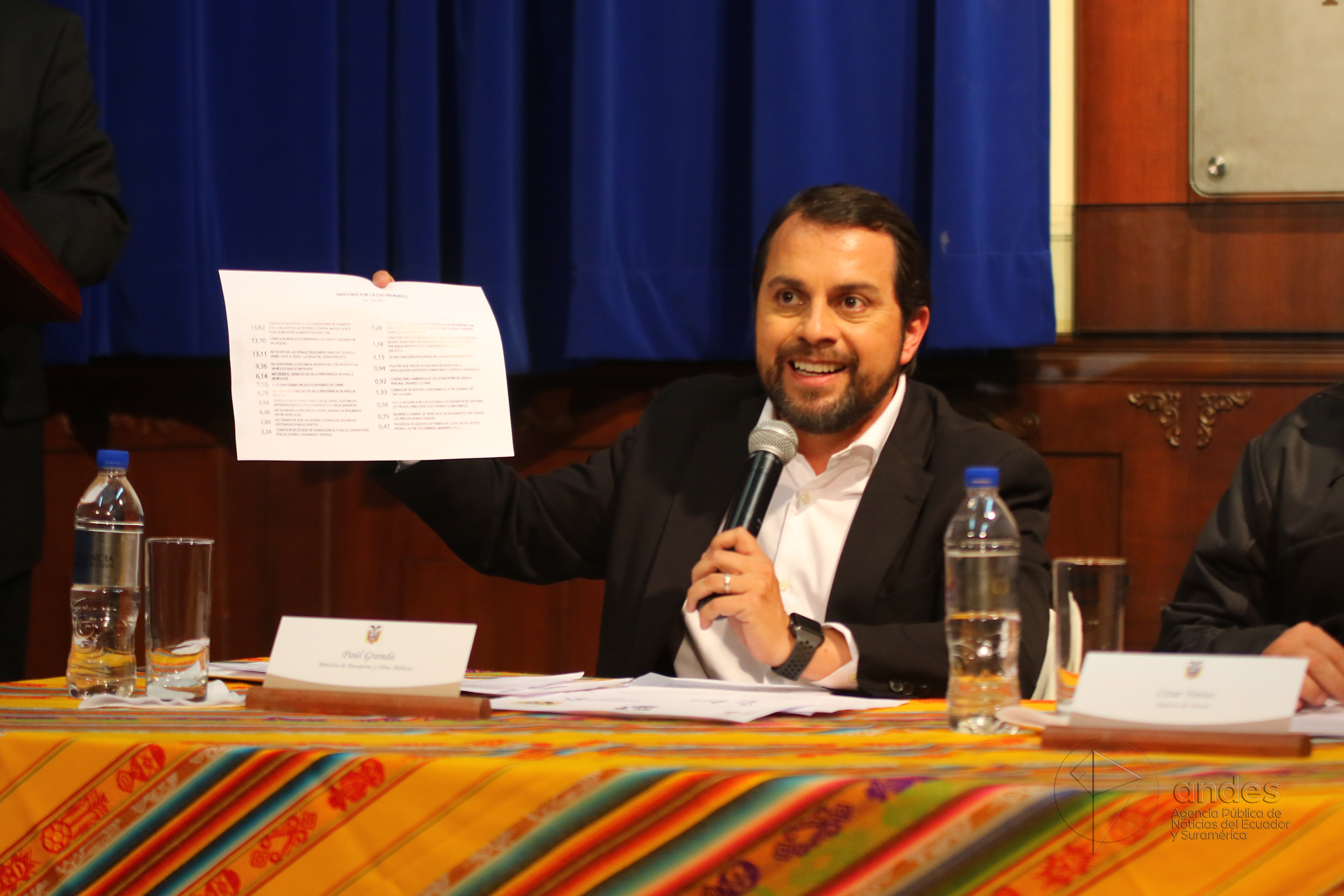
Paúl Granda during a press conference.

== Biography ==
During his high school years, he was elected student council president of Colegio Rafael Borja. He continued his education in Universidad del Azuay (UDA), where he obtained a degree as a Juris Doctor and Lawyer. During this period he was the president of the Association of the Law School, representing students onto the University Council, and president of the Student Federation of Universidad del Azuay.

In 1997, he was advisor to Mario Jaramillo Paredes in the Ministry of Education and Culture. He studied a specialization in Private Financial Legislation in Universidad Andina Simón Bolívar.

In 1998, he traveled to Spain for his studies and obtained a Masters in Public Administration from Instituto de Administración Pública – INAP and Universidad de Alcalá. He also holds a specialization in Momunication and Public administration from Universidad Complutense de Madrid, a Masters in Corporate Law from Universidad de Valencia and a Diploma of Higher Studies.

In May 2017 he obtained his PhD degree in Government and Public Governance from Universidad Complutense de Madrid, College of Political Sciences and Instituto Universitario Ortega y Gasset.

He was the executive director for the Instituto de Régimen Seccional del Ecuador (IERSE) for Universidad del Azuay and a professor for the same university. He was also the director of the masters program in Corporate Law and the Diploma Program for Administration of Sectional Governments.

In 2006 he was elected councilman for the city of Cuenca with the largest number of votes among the candidates. Later he would be designated as vice mayor.

In 2009 he was elected mayor of the city, position which he held until May 2014. During his administration the Tranvía de Cuenca was planned and began its construction.

Between 2014 and 2016 he functioned as advisor to the Embassy of Ecuador in Spain. In May 2017 he was designated as Minister of Transportation and Public Works by president Lenín Moreno in May 2018 he was reassigned as National Secretary of Public Administration.
