= María Augusta Hermida =

Ecuadorian architect

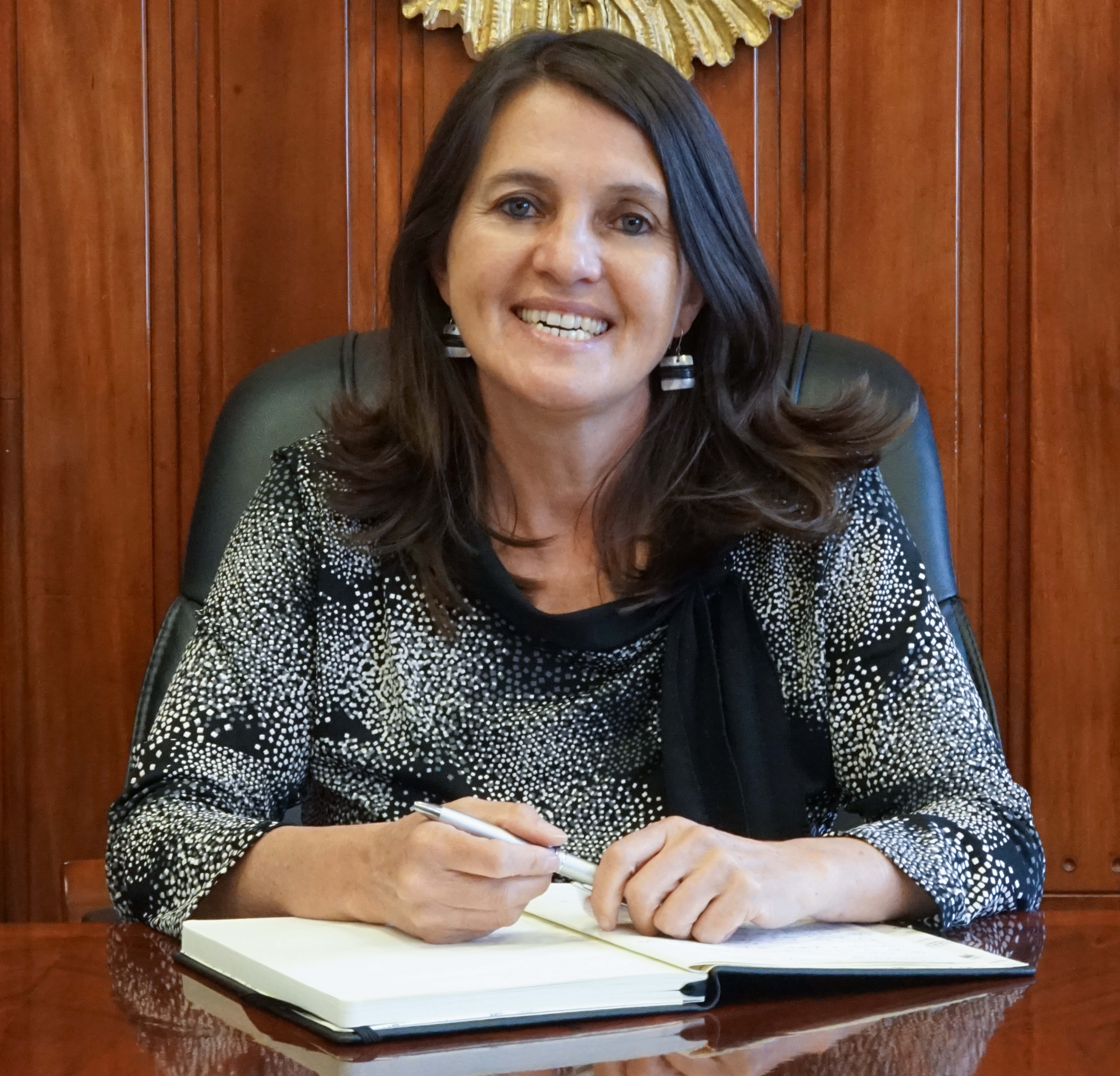
- Born: 1967 (age 58–59)
- Education: University of Cuenca; Polytechnic University of Catalonia
- Occupation: University rector
- Employer(s): Durán & Hermida architects studio
- Spouse: Javier Durán

María Augusta Hermida Palacios (born 1967) is an Ecuadorian architect and academic who co-owns Durán & Hermida Architects Studio. She was a professor of architecture before she became the first woman rector of her alma mater, the University of Cuenca.

== Life ==
She was born in 1967. Her father's politics was of the left. Her younger sister is the film maker Tania Hermida. Her father, a physician ensured that his daughters grew up surrounded by art and literature. When she was a child, her family devised a familial newspaper called Horizontes wherein each member of the family wrote a page.

She qualified as an architect in 1999 at the University of Cuenca. Four years later she gained a master's degree in Computerization of Architectural Projects from the Polytechnic University of Catalonia.

In 2005 she started to teach at the University of Cuenca where she taught the history, design and theory of architecture. She taught students gaining master's degrees for architecture projects and in time she was promoted to be the principal Professor. In 2011 she gained her doctorate at the Polytechnic University of Catalonia.

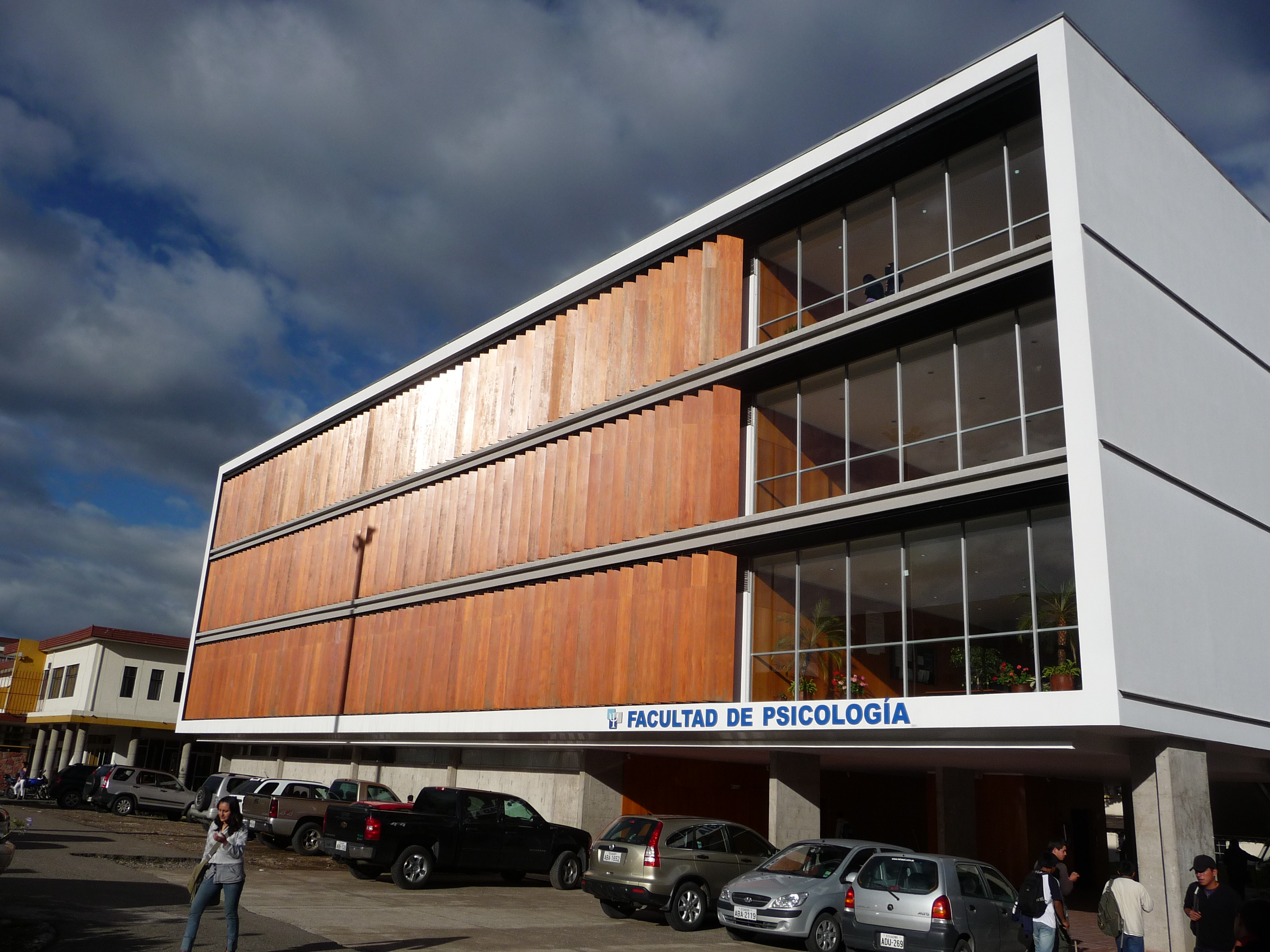
Building by Duran & Hermida

She and her husband began an architectural practice, Duran & Hermida, which has designed several buildings. They designed the Plaza Víctor J. Cuesta and it won a National Urban Design Award at the Bienal Panamericana de Arquitectura de Quito in 2008.

In 2021 she was elected to be the first woman rector of the University of Cuenca by the staff and students. She wanted to bring in a less vertical management structure.
