= Aurelia Palmieri =

Ecuadorian Doctor (1869 – 1937)

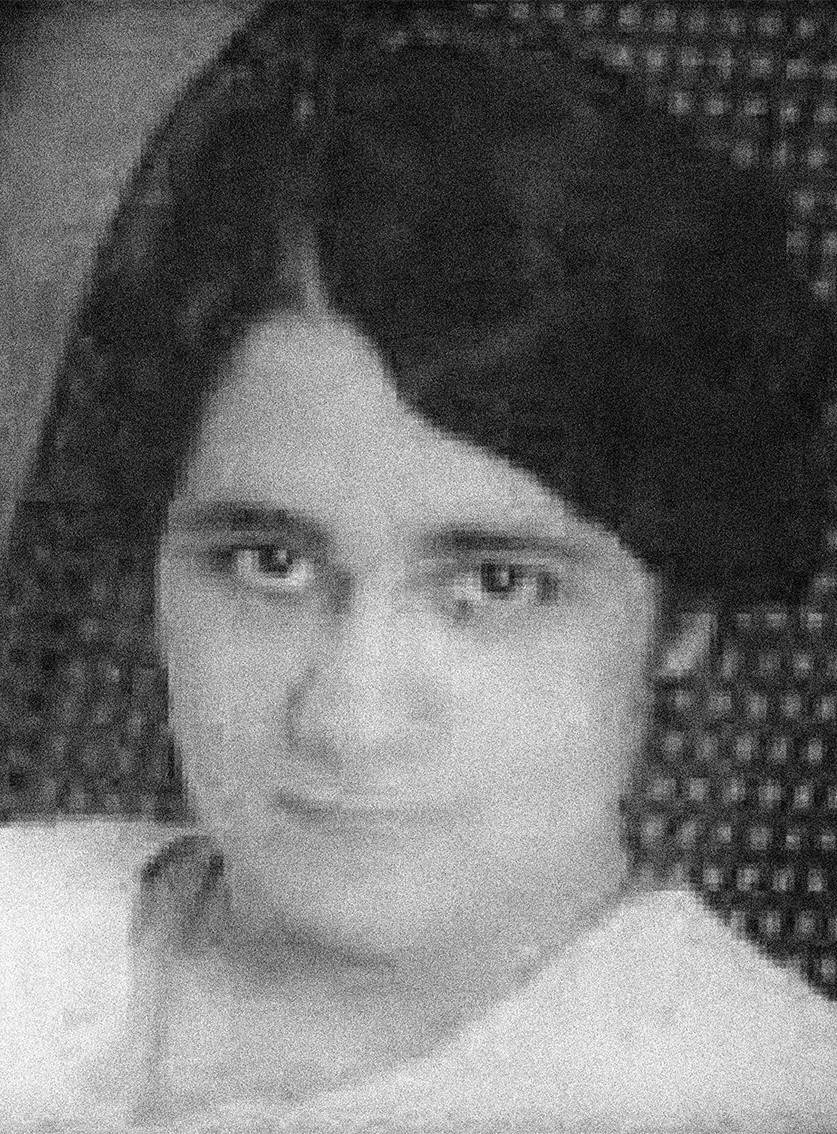
- Born: 1869; Quito
- Died: 1937 (aged 67–68)
- Known for: first female medical student in Ecuador

Aurelia Palmieri Minuche (1869 – 1937) was an Ecuadorian doctor. She was the first female medical student in Ecuador, eventually earning a degree in medicine. She was a pioneer in the struggle for women's education in Ecuador.

== Life ==
Palmieri was born in Quito with an Italian heritage. She was an advocate for women's rights in education in Ecuador. She became the first female university student in the country, thanks to a decree made by the president Eloy Alfaro. Her qualifications to enter the university were incomplete because of her gender. Alfaro's decree made these unnecessary. She was awarded a pension of 50 sucres per month while she was at university and this allowed her to enter the Faculty of Medicine.

She was the first woman student at the University of Guayaquil.

== Legacy ==
Her example is thought to have inspired later pioneers including Elena Valle Schennone was Ecuador's first woman surgeon.
