= La Libertad, Ecuador =

La Libertad
- City
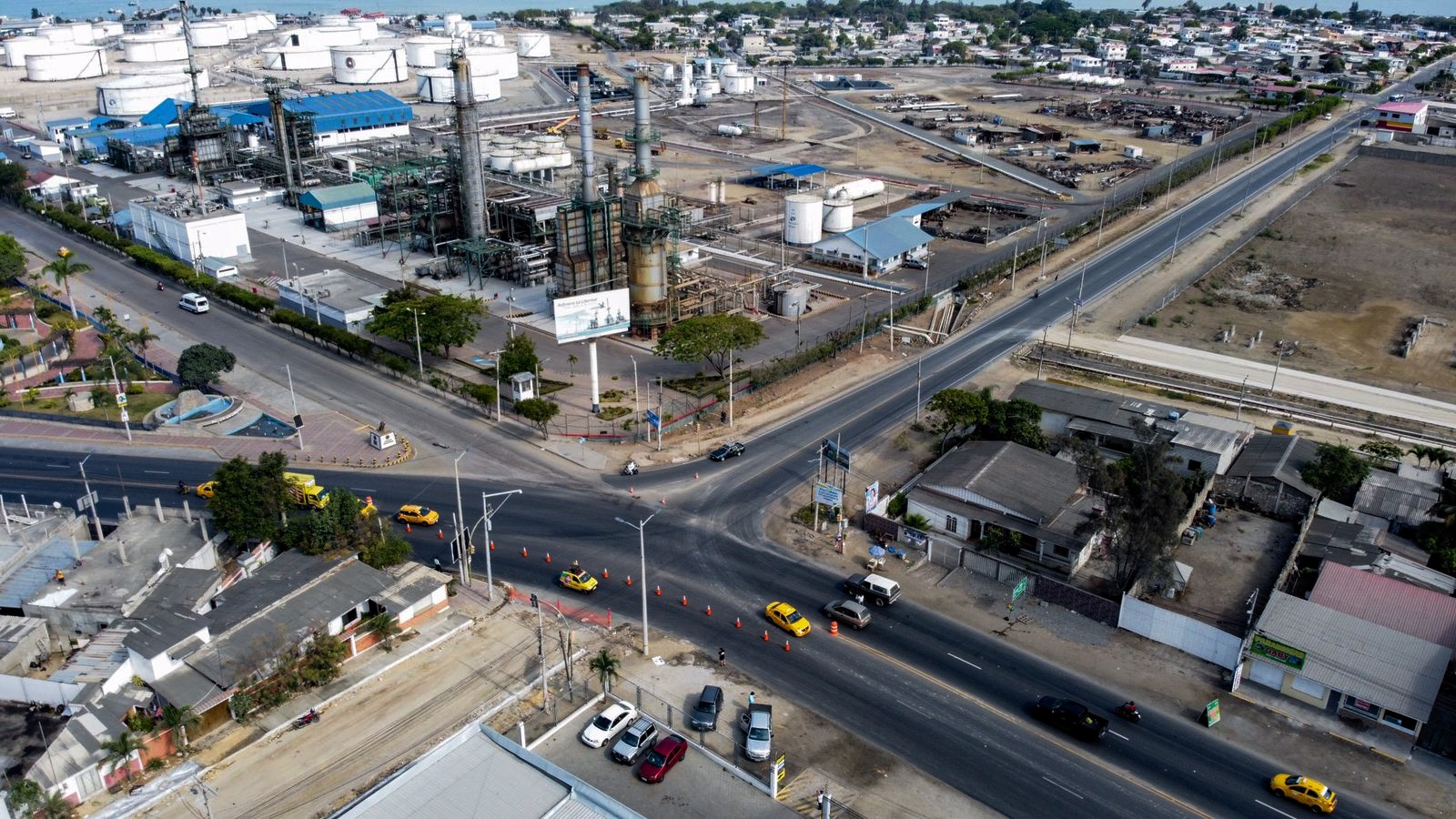
- Highway E40

- Flag

- Location within Ecuador
- Coordinates: 2°14′S 80°54′W
- Country: Ecuador
- Province: Santa Elena
- Canton: La Libertad Canton

Area
  - City: 18.71 km^{2} (7.22 sq mi)

Population (2022 census)
  - City: 112,154
  - Density: 5,994/km^{2} (15,530/sq mi)

La Libertad is a city located in western Santa Elena Province, Ecuador, by the Pacific Ocean. It is the seat of La Libertad Canton.

As of the census of 2022, there are 112,154 people residing in the city. La Libertad is a canton itself, since 1993. Before 1993, it was part of Salinas Canton. La Libertad has important oil fields and reservoirs.

== Climate ==
La Libertad has an arid desert climate (Köppen: BWh).

Climate data for La Libertad
Month	Jan	Feb	Mar	Apr	May	Jun	Jul	Aug	Sep	Oct	Nov	Dec	Year
Mean daily maximum °C (°F)	24.4 (75.9)	25.6 (78.1)	25.8 (78.4)	24.9 (76.8)	23.8 (74.8)	22.5 (72.5)	21.8 (71.2)	21.3 (70.3)	21.1 (70.0)	21.4 (70.5)	21.8 (71.2)	22.9 (73.2)	23.1 (73.6)
Daily mean °C (°F)	24.1 (75.4)	25.2 (77.4)	25.3 (77.5)	24.5 (76.1)	23.4 (74.1)	22.2 (72.0)	21.5 (70.7)	20.9 (69.6)	20.8 (69.4)	21.0 (69.8)	21.4 (70.5)	22.5 (72.5)	22.7 (72.9)
Mean daily minimum °C (°F)	23.7 (74.7)	24.7 (76.5)	24.8 (76.6)	24.0 (75.2)	23.0 (73.4)	21.8 (71.2)	21.1 (70.0)	20.6 (69.1)	20.4 (68.7)	20.7 (69.3)	21.1 (70.0)	22.2 (72.0)	22.3 (72.2)
Average precipitation mm (inches)	36.3 (1.43)	79.4 (3.13)	76.2 (3.00)	37.2 (1.46)	18.5 (0.73)	14.1 (0.56)	13.4 (0.53)	11.9 (0.47)	13.3 (0.52)	12.0 (0.47)	12.5 (0.49)	17.4 (0.69)	342.2 (13.48)
Source: Weather.Directory
