= Universidad Católica de Santiago de Guayaquil =

Catholic University of Santiago de Guayaquil
- Universidad Católica de Santiago de Guayaquil
- Other names: UCSG
- Motto: "Ciencia y Fe"
- Motto in English: "Science and Faith"
- Type: Private
- Established: 17 May 1962; 64 years ago
- Founders: César Mosquera Corral
- Affiliations: SENESCYT
- Religious affiliation: Roman Catholic
- Rector: MSc. Walter Vicente Mera Ortiz
- Principal: Florencio Compte Guerrero
- Students: 49,000
- Undergraduates: 12,500
- Postgraduates: 2,500
- Location: Guayaquil, Ecuador; 2°10′54″S 79°54′14″W
- Campus: Urban
- Colours: Dark pink and white
- Website: Official Website

Universidad Católica de Santiago de Guayaquil (UCSG) (English: Catholic University of Santiago de Guayaquil) is a private, Catholic, higher education institution in Guayaquil, Ecuador.

== See also ==
- List of universities in Ecuador
- Pontificia Universidad Católica del Ecuador
- University of Guayaquil
