= Council for Higher Education of Ecuador =

Autonomous entity of the Ecuadorian Government

HIgher Education Council Ecuador
- Consejo de Educación Superior

Agency overview
- Formed: October 12, 2010
- Preceding agency: CONESUP
- Jurisdiction: Ecuadorian Government
- Headquarters: Quito
- Ministers responsible: Pablo Beltran
- Parent agency: SENESCYT
- Child agencies: Centro de Estudios de Educación Superior; Clúster Académico Productivo del Ecuador

The Consejo de Educación Superior (Higher Education Council; CES) is an autonomous entity of the Ecuadorian Government, with public legal status and independent juridical personality, de derecho público, con personería jurídica. Its function is to be the planning, regulating, and coordinating body of the National System of Higher Education of the Republic of Ecuador. The entity is based in the city of Quito.

The CES's mission is to plan, regulate, and coordinate the Higher Education System, and the relationship between its different actors with the Executive Function and Ecuadorian society, to ensure quality higher education that contributes to the country's growth.

== Services ==
Among its main objectives are to consolidate the Higher Education System, strengthen efficiency in issuing and reforming the necessary regulations for the exercise of responsible autonomy of Higher Education Institutions, and enhance institutional capacities.

Its services include the legalization of signatures on university documents, as a requirement requested by international institutions, and individuals moving abroad. Approval of degrees proposed by institutions of higher education; required to practice a profession, join a professional association. This applies to higher technical, undergraduate, and graduate degrees for both Ecuadorian and foreign professionals. Additionally, it will issue a report on projects from new universities to the National Assembly, which will pass the law for the creation of said institutions.

== External websites ==
- Official web page
