= Salinas Canton =

- Canton
- Location of Santa Elena Province in Ecuador.

- Cantons of Santa Elena Province
- Coordinates: 2°13′S 80°57′W
- Country: Ecuador
- Province: Santa Elena Province

Area
  - Total: 67.86 km^{2} (26.20 sq mi)

Population (2022 census)
  - Total: 86,801
  - Density: 1,279/km^{2} (3,313/sq mi)
- Time zone: UTC-5 (ECT)

Salinas Canton is a canton of Ecuador, located in the Santa Elena Province. Its capital is the town of Salinas. Its population at the 2001 census was 49,572. The actual governor of this city is Paul Borbor Mite who was elected by a democratic process in 2008.

== Demographics ==
Ethnic groups as of the Ecuadorian census of 2010:

- Mestizo 81.8%
- Afro-Ecuadorian 8.2%
- White 5.1%
- Montubio 3.1%
- Indigenous 0.2%
- Other 1.9%
