= La Libertad Canton =

- Canton
- Flag

- Location of Santa Elena Province in Ecuador.

- La Libertad Canton in Santa Elena Province
- Coordinates: 2°14′0″S 80°54′0″W
- Country: Ecuador
- Province: Santa Elena Province

Area
  - Total: 25.3 km^{2} (9.8 sq mi)

Population (2022 census)
  - Total: 112,247
  - Density: 4,440/km^{2} (11,500/sq mi)
- Time zone: UTC-5 (ECT)

La Libertad Canton is a canton of Ecuador, located in the Santa Elena Province. Its capital is the town of La Libertad. Its population at the 2001 census was 77,646.

== Demographics ==
Ethnic groups as of the Ecuadorian census of 2010:

- Mestizo 77.0%
- Afro-Ecuadorian 10.2%
- Montubio 5.1%
- White 4.5%
- Indigenous 1.2%
- Other 2.0%
