= University of Cuenca =

Ecuadorian university located in Cuenca

- Universidad de Cuenca
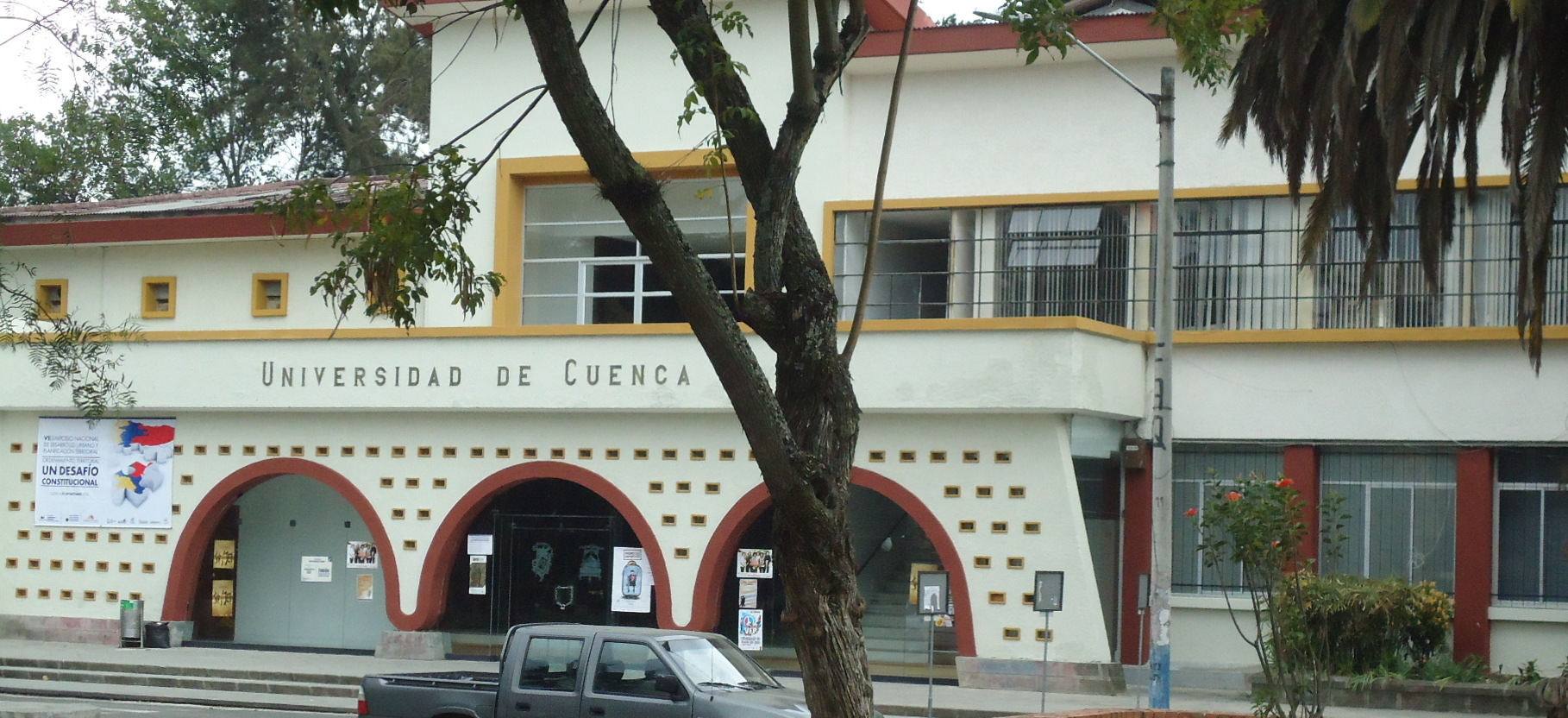
- Motto: "Fons Vitae Eruditio Possidentis"
- Type: Public
- Established: 1867; 159 years ago
- Rector: Dr. María Augusta Hermida Palacios
- Students: 12000
- Address: Avenue 12 de abril, Cuenca, Azuay Province, Ecuador; 2°54′02″S 79°00′32″W
- Website: www.ucuenca.edu.ec

The University of Cuenca (Spanish: Universidad de Cuenca) is an Ecuadorian university located in Cuenca. University of Cuenca is the principal university of Azuay Province. The university was officially founded in 1867 and is the first university on Cuenca.

== History ==
Created under the presidency of Jerónimo Carrión y Palacio, on October 15, 1867, under the name of University Corporation of Azuay and the faculties of Jurisprudence, of Medicine and Pharmacy, of Philosophy and Literature and of Theology. His first rector was the Ecuadorian lawyer and politician Benigno Malo.

In 1868 the chairs of Industrial Chemistry, Botany, Zoology, Geology, Engineering, Lithography and Engraving were created under the leadership of German professors. As a result of this, the Faculty of Sciences was created in 1890. On May 24, 1882, the Public Library of Azuay is founded at the university. In 1897, after the Liberal Revolution, the then University Corporation of Azuay was recognized as the University of Azuay.

In 1919 the first student representation in the university was created. In 1925 the Public Library of Azuay takes the name of "Juan Bautista Vázquez". Later on 1926 the university was renamed as the University of Cuenca.

In 1935 the Higher School of Mines was created and four years later, the Faculty of Mathematical and Physical Sciences with the School of Civil Engineering.

Under the rector of Carlos Cueva Tamariz the Faculty of Philosophy, Letters and Education Sciences was founded in 1952, followed a year later by the School of Industrial Chemistry, now School of Chemical Engineering.

In 1958 Cueva founded the School of Architecture and Urbanism and three years later the School of Economic Sciences. Cueva Tamariz retired in 1966 leaving a modern and renovated university. Two years after his retirement, the School of Nursing and Social Work was founded.

In 1970 the President of the Republic, José María Velasco Ibarra closed all state universities until 1971.

After the reopening, the University created the schools of Business Administration in 1971, of Electrical Engineering the following year, of Sociology in 1975, and those of Medical Technology, Agronomic Engineering and Veterinary Medicine in 1979.

In the decade of the 80s the schools of Superior Accounting, Physical Education and Visual Arts were opened.

In 2021, Dr. María Augusta Hermida Palacios became the first woman rector of the university.

== Faculties ==
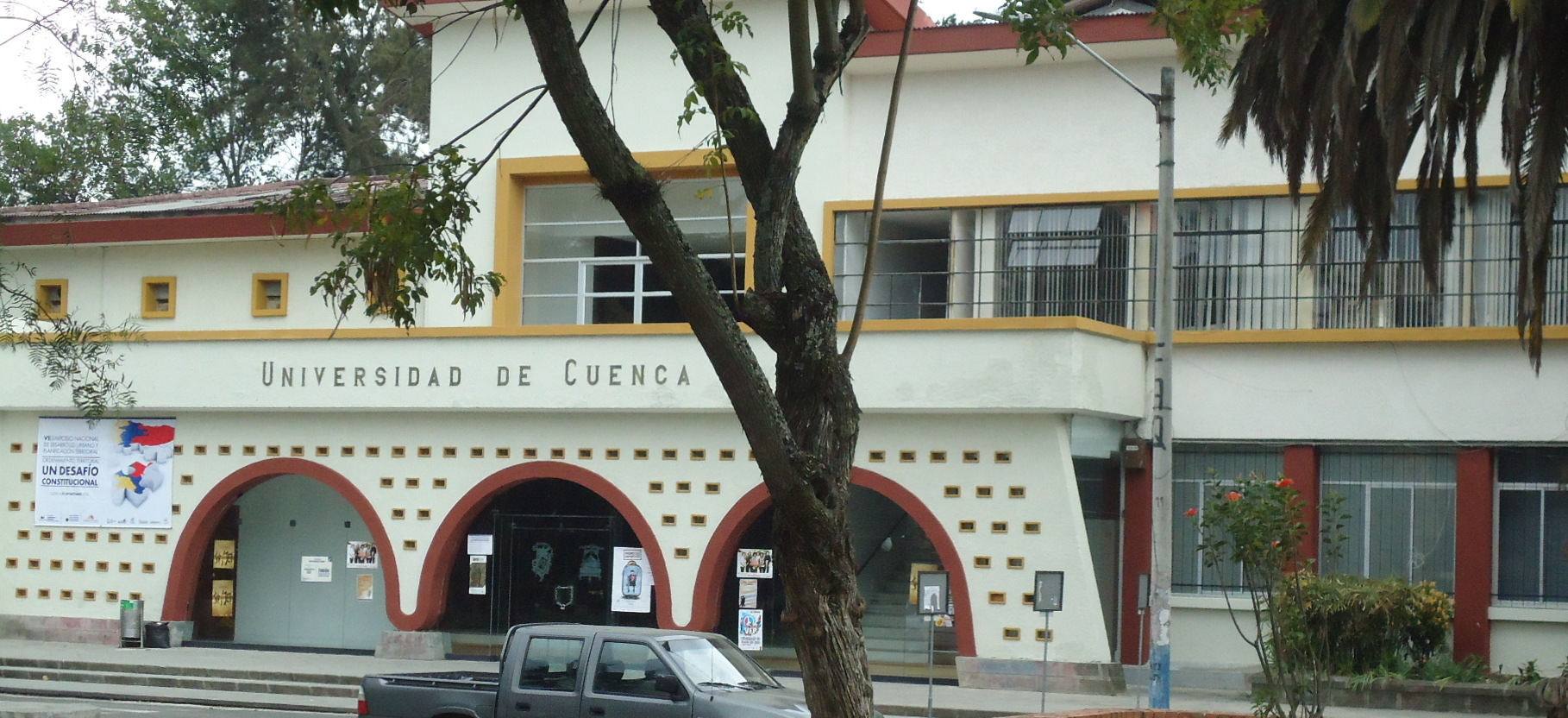
University of Cuenca Main Campus

Currently the university is made up by the following faculties:

Architecture and Urbanism

- Architecture

Arts

- Musical Arts
- Visual Arts
- Dance and Theater
- Graphic Design
- Interior design

Agricultural Sciences

- Agronomic Engineering
- Veterinary Medicine and Zootechnics

Hospitality Sciences

- Gastronomy
- Hospitality
- Bachelor of Tourism Administration
- Tourism

Economic and Administrative Sciences

- Business Administration
- Accounting and Auditing
- Economy
- Business Engineering
- Marketing
- Sociology

Medical Sciences

- Nursery
- Career of Early Stimulation in Health
- Speech Therapy Career
- Imaging
- Clinical Laboratory
- Medicine and Surgery
- Nutrition and Dietetics
- Physical Therapy

Chemical Sciences

- Biochemistry and Pharmacy
- Environmental Engineering
- Industrial Engineering
- Chemical Engineering

Philosophy, Letters and Educational Sciences

- Educational Sciences in the Specialization of Philosophy, Sociology and Economics
- Education Sciences in the Specialization of History and Geography
- Education Sciences in the Specialization of Language, Literature and Audiovisual Languages
- Educational Sciences in the Specialization of English Language and Literature
- Social Communication Sciences in Journalism and Digital Communication
- Social Communication Sciences in Organizational Communication and Public Relations
- Education Sciences in Mathematics and Physics Specialization
- Educational Sciences in the Specialization of Physical Culture
- Basic General Education
- Film and Audiovisual
- Initial Education

Engineering

- Civil Engineering
- Systems Engineering
- Electrical Engineering
- Telecommunications Engineering

Jurisprudence, Political and Social Sciences

- Law
- Family Orientation
- Social Work
- Gender and Development

Odontology

- Odontology

Psychology

- Clinical Psychology
- Educational Psychology
- Social Psychology
- General Psychology
