= Santa Elena Province =

Province of Ecuador

Coordinates: 2.2267°S 80.8583°W

Santa Elena
- Province
- Province of Santa Elena
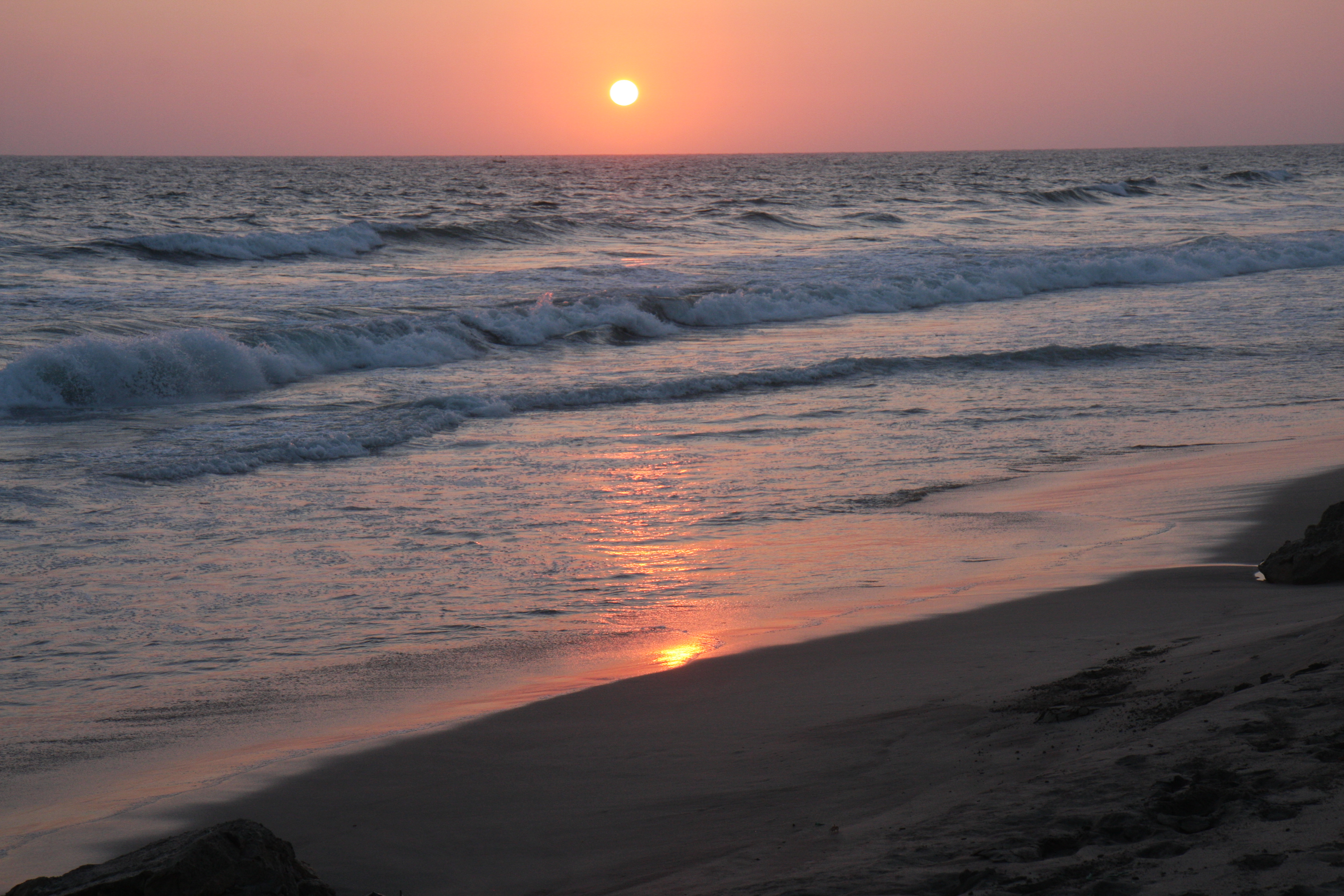
- Punta Carnero beach at the Pacific coast in Santa Elena Province

- Flag

- Location of Santa Elena Province in Ecuador

- Cantons of Santa Elena Province
- Country: Ecuador
- Established: November 7, 2007
- Named for: Santa Elena
- Capital: Santa Elena
- Largest city: La Libertad
- Cantons: List of Cantons: La Libertad; Salinas; Santa Elenta

Government
  - Prefect: José Daniel Villao (MPCG)
  - Vice Prefect: Juanita Cordova
  - Governor: Gilberto Pino Herrera

Area
  - Total: 3,691 km^{2} (1,425 sq mi)

Population (2022 census)
  - Total: 385,735
  - Density: 104.5/km^{2} (270.7/sq mi)
- Time zone: UTC-5 (ECT)
- Area code: (0)4
- Vehicle registration: Y
- HDI (2017): 0.712 high · 20th
- Website: www.santaelena.gob.ec

The Province of Santa Elena (Spanish pronunciation: [ˌsanta eˈlena]) is a province of Ecuador in the coastal region. Created in 2007 from territory that belonged to the Guayas Province, it is one of the two newest provinces of Ecuador, along with Santo Domingo de Los Tsáchilas. Its capital city is Santa Elena, from which the province derives its name.

== Political division ==
The province is divided into three cantons. The following table lists each with its population at the 2001 census, its area in square kilometres (km^{2}), and the name of the canton seat or capital.

Canton	Pop. (2001)	Area (km^{2})	Seat/Capital
La Libertad	115,950	25	La Libertad
Salinas	92,020	69	Salinas
Santa Elena	184,640	3,669	Santa Elena

== Demographics ==
Ethnic groups as of the Ecuadorian census of 2010:

- Mestizo 79.1%
- Afro-Ecuadorian 8.5%
- Montubio 4.9%
- White 3.7%
- Indigenous 1.4%
- Other 2.4%

== See also ==
- Provinces of Ecuador
- Cantons of Ecuador
