= University of Guayaquil =

Coordinates: 2.18341°S 79.89576°W

- Universidad de Guayaquil
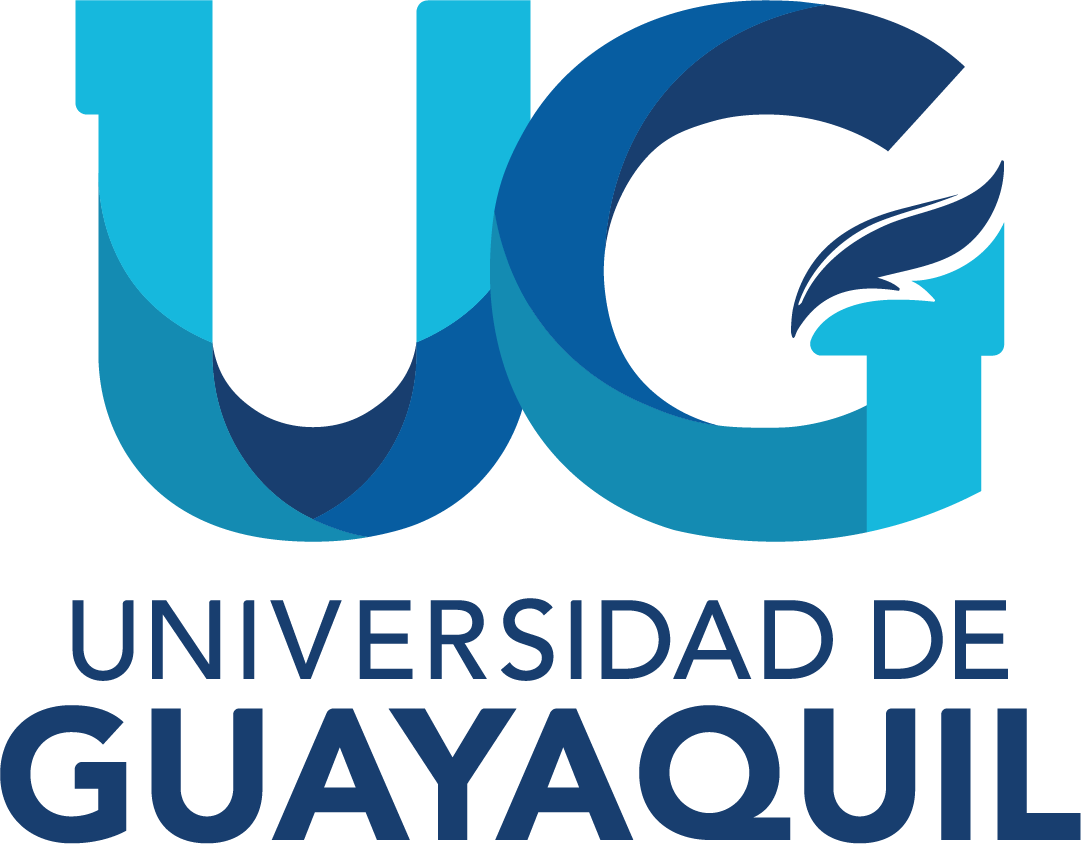
- Type: Public university
- Established: 1867; 159 years ago
- Students: 71,611 (2025)
- Location: Guayaquil, Guayas Province, Ecuador
- Website: ug.edu.ec (in Spanish)

The University of Guayaquil (Spanish: Universidad de Guayaquil), known colloquially as the Estatal (i.e., "the State [University]"), is a public university in Guayaquil, Guayas Province, Ecuador.

The University of Guayaquil was founded on 1 December 1867, when the University Board of Guayas was formally established with the authority to award professional degrees in the coastal region of Ecuador. It is the oldest university in the city and holds the largest student body in Ecuador, with over 70,000 enrolled students. The institution operates several university extensions throughout the country.

== Notable alumni ==
The first woman to attend the University was Aurelia Palmieri (1869-1937).

Zaida Rovira studied law here and she became the Ecuadorian Ombudsman and then the Minister of Inclusion, Economic and Social in Ecuador from November 2023.

== See also ==
- List of universities in Ecuador
