= Aeroservicios Ecuatorianos Flight 767-103 =

1984 aviation accident

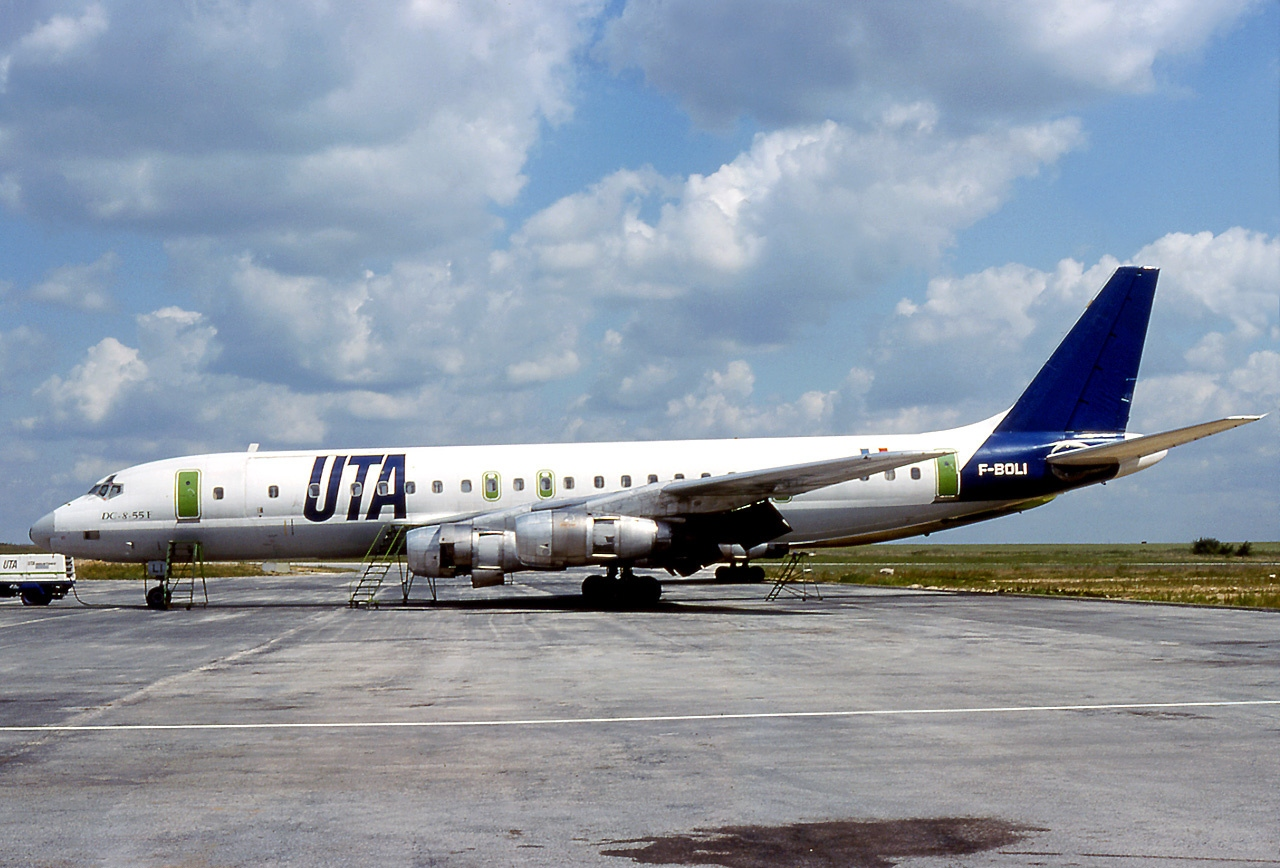
- The aircraft involved in the accident in 1979, while still in operation with Union de Transports Aériens

Accident
- Date: 18 September 1984
- Summary: Failed take-off followed by runway excursion and crash due to pilot error
- Site: Mariscal Sucre International Airport, Quito, Ecuador; 0.1°S 78.5°W
- Total fatalities: 53 (including 49 on the ground)

Aircraft
- Aircraft type: Douglas DC-8-55F
- Operator: Aeroservicios Ecuatorianos (AECA)
- Registration: HC-BKN
- Flight origin: Miami International Airport, Florida, United States
- Stopover: Quito Airport, Quito, Ecuador
- Destination: Simón Bolívar International Airport, Guayaquil, Ecuador
- Occupants: 4
- Passengers: 0
- Crew: 4
- Fatalities: 4
- Survivors: 0

Ground casualties
- Ground fatalities: 49

Aeroservicios Ecuatorianos Flight 767-103 was a scheduled freight flight from Miami in the United States, to Guayaquil, Ecuador, with an intermediate stop in the Ecuadorian capital of Quito. On 18 September 1984, the flight was being operated by a Douglas DC-8-55F jet (registered in Ecuador as HC-BKN). It failed to get airborne during the takeoff run at Quito Airport, hit an Instrument Landing System (ILS) antenna at the end of the runway, and then struck several houses. All four crew and 49 people on the ground were killed.

== Aircraft ==
The aircraft was a Douglas DC-8-55F four-engined jet cargo transport that had been built in the United States in 1965. First delivered to Trans International Airlines on 18 May 1965, it was bought by Aeroservicios Ecuatorianos in August 1983.

== Investigation ==
Authorities recovered both flight recorders and sent them to Washington, D.C. for analysis at the National Transportation Safety Board's facilities. It was found that the cockpit voice recorder tape's protective cover detached during the crash, exposing it to the post-crash fire and destroying it, even though investigators could not determine whether it was operational before the accident. The flight data recorder was not operating at the time, and it was revealed that it was not properly maintained; the same side of its tape had been used three times, as it had not been reversed after 200 hours, according to the specifications of Sundstrand, its manufacturer. Moreover, because it had to be turned on and off manually, crews were apparently not used to turning it on.

In the end, an investigation by the Accident Investigation Board of Ecuador's Directorate General of Civil Aviation concluded that the crew failed to notice that the horizontal stabiliser was set at 0.5 degrees nose up when it should have been 8 degrees nose up; this increased the time and distance needed by the aircraft to rotate, and the conclusion was that the aircraft did not have enough runway length to get airborne. A number of contributory factors were also involved:

- The crew were involved in a labor dispute which caused them to leave in haste; the crew's state of mind may have been a contributing factor and it is assumed that they did not concentrate on all aspects of the aircraft's operation.
- Issues with the departure clearance were also a factor; it was done incorrectly in that the maximum take-off weight for the runway and prevailing conditions, the distribution of the load and centre of gravity were not determined.

The investigation made eight safety recommendations.

== Aftermath ==
Newly-inaugurated President of Ecuador, León Febres Cordero, declared three days of national mourning.

A contributing factor to the accident was the airport's location in a densely populated area, with public concerns about its risks becoming acute after the AECA tragedy. A near-miss incident, which served as a premonition of another tragedy, came twelve years later on 1 May 1996, when an overloaded Fly Linhas Aéreas Boeing 727, which carried the Corinthians football team, overran runway 35 (start of runway 17) after a failed take-off in rainy conditions, hitting the ILS installation, going down a slope or embankment, hitting the perimeter wall and coming to rest in the Tufiño avenue. No one was killed among the 79 passengers and 11 crew, but the plane was written off.

However, renewed criticism and concerns over the Mariscal Sucre Airport's location would reemerge two years later after the crash of Cubana de Aviación Flight 389, on 29 August 1998, which also occurred after a failed take-off, killing 91 people. The crash, which was an almost identical occurrence to that of AECA's, occurred at the end of the same runway from where the AECA DC-8 crashed 14 years earlier, killing up to ten people in the ground and destroying public & private property.

The CU389 tragedy led to the construction of a runway safety area at the airport in 1999-2000, which increased the runway excursion space for planes to stop in case of a rejected takeoff or a botched landing. However, a similar safety structure was not built in the opposite end of the runway. In the end, a new airport was finally opened in 2013, about 18 kilometres (11 mi; 9.7 nmi) east of Quito, outside its urban area.
