= Zaida Rovira =

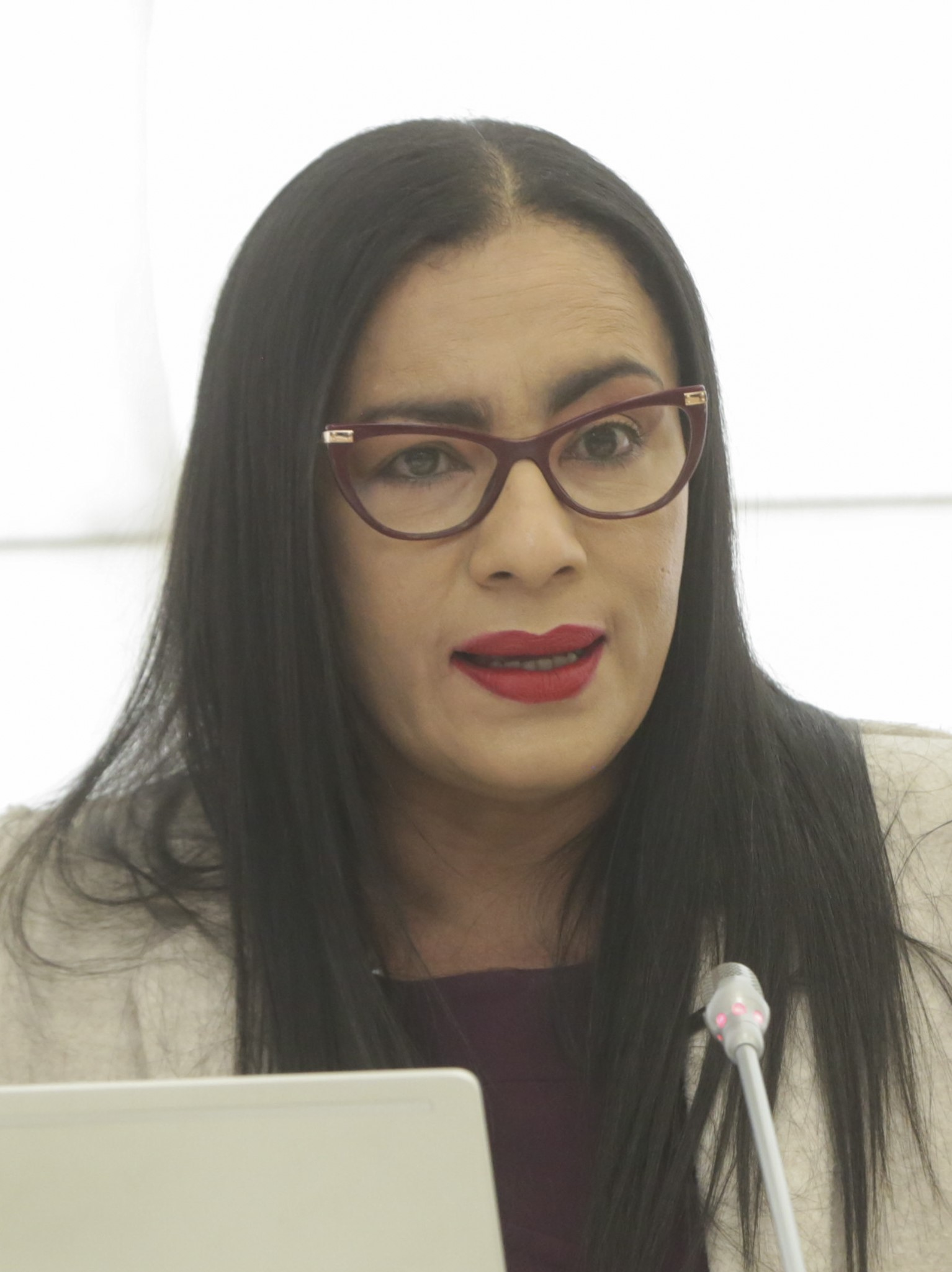
- in 2021
- Born: c.1969
- Education: University of Guayaquil; University of La Rioja

Zaida Rovira is an Ecuadorian politician, who has served as Minister of Economic and Social Inclusion in Ecuador from November 2023.

== Life ==
Rovira was born in about 1969 and she went to the University in Guayaquil and graduated in law. She later went to the Spanish University of La Rioja where she studied Human Rights and Protection Systems and she was awarded a master's degree.

In 2015 she was employed in Santa Elena and she was also lecturing to students at Santa Elena Peninsula State University.

In 2020 she became the deputy ombudsman and Freddy Carrión was the ombudsman for Ecuador. He was involved in accusations of ineffectiveness and sexual misconduct. With his removal in May it was Rovira who took his place as a surrogate. Carrion was went to jail for three years in October 2021.

When Daniel Noboa took over as President of Ecuador he made several early ministerial appointments on 23 November 2023 and Rovira was chosen as his Minister of Economic and Social Inclusion. Fellow ministers in the new government included Yvonne Nunez, Romina Muñoz, Arianna Tanca, Monica Palencia and Gabriela Sommerfeld.

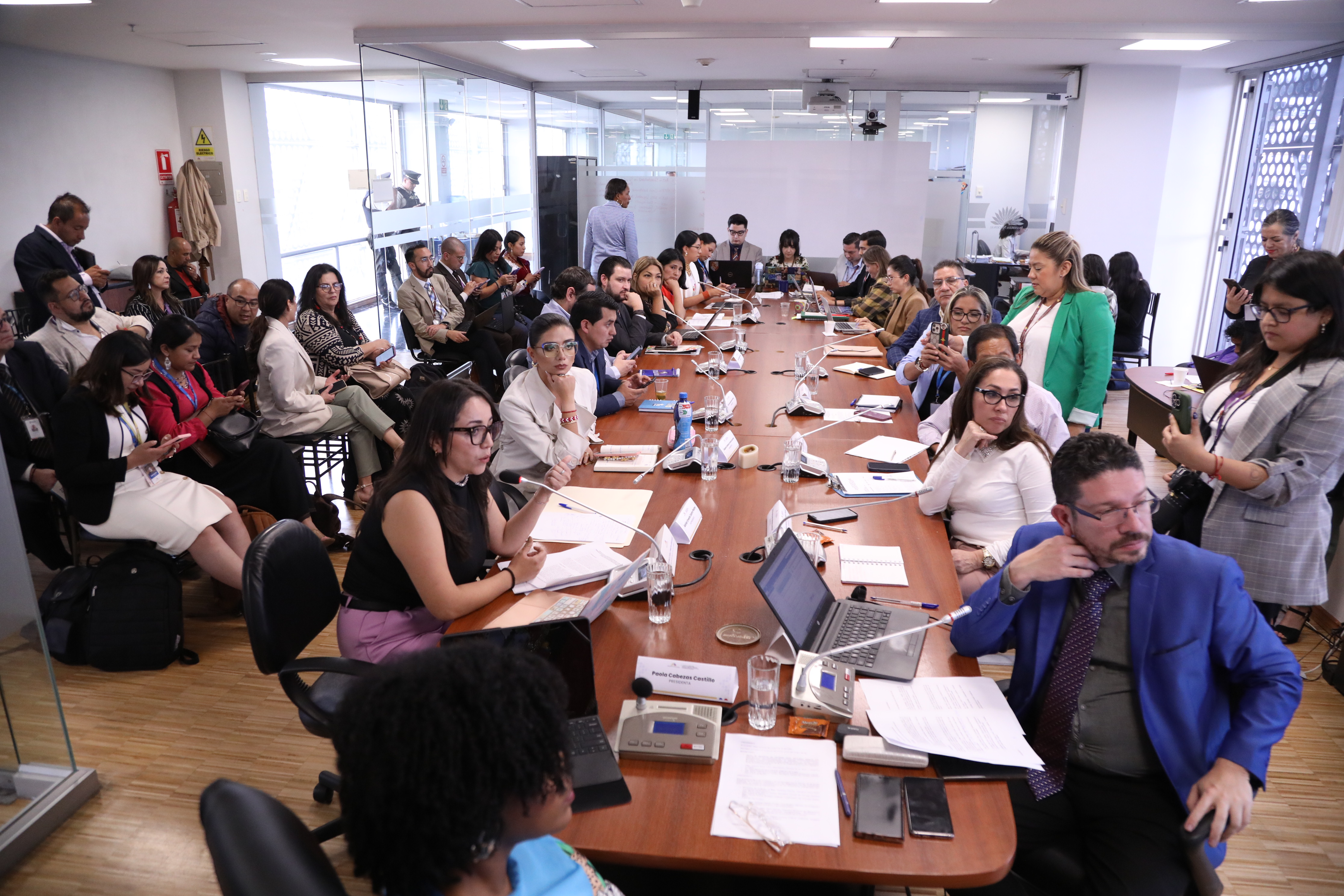
Arianna Tanca, Minister of Women and Human Rights, César Córdova, Ombudsman and Rovira, discuss reparations for the victims of femicide in 2024

In April 2024 she visited Tena in support of work that supports the very young children of women or men at the Tena Higher Technological Institute. Children who are aged between one and three years receive first class care which allows their mother or father to gain an education that permits them to gain a profession. In the following month she visited Chimborazo Province in central Ecuador where there had been floods in Alausí Canton.

She spoke in September 2024 about gender violence. She believes that the solution is to improve women's financial autonomy. She mentioned "Human Development Credit" that supplies money to people in Ecuador and over 90% of the claimants are women in poverty. The loans, she said, are to encourage people into business and the money may rescue these women from extreme poverty.
