= Alegría Crespo =

Alegria Crespo
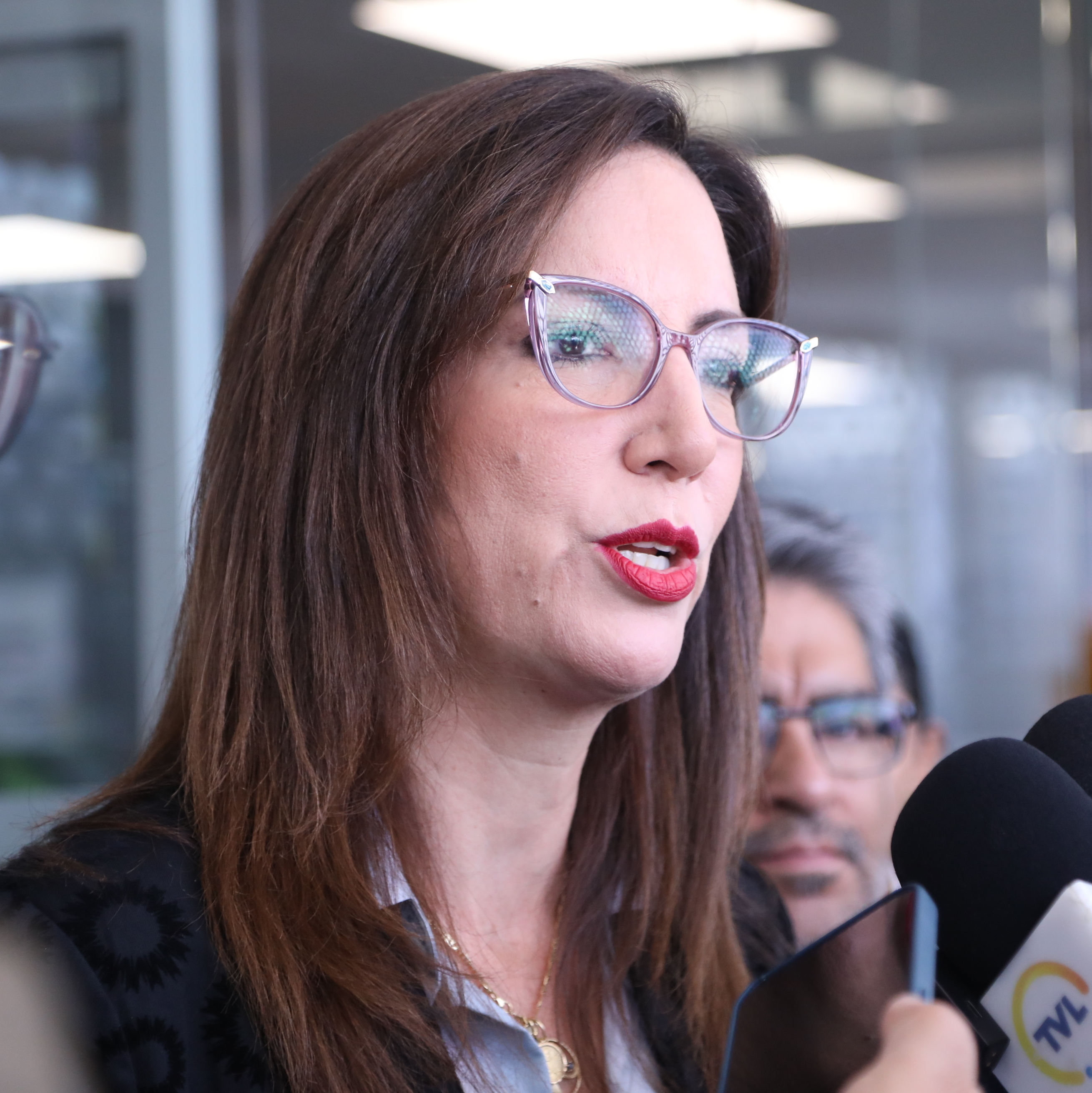
- in 2025
- Born: c.1975
- Education: Universidad San Francisco de Quito, National University of Rosario
- Occupations: Professor and politician
- Known for: Minister of Education
- Predecessor: Daniel Calderón
- Successor: incumbent (2024)

Alegría de Lourdes Crespo Cordovez is an Ecuadorian politician who became Minister of Education in 2024.

== Life ==
Crespo was born in about 1975. In August 1998, when she was 23, her family was on board Cubana de Aviación Flight 389, which crashed at Quito's then-Mariscal Sucre International Airport. They were going on a holiday to Cuba, but the plane failed to take off due to a crew error and crashed outside the airport perimeter. Her father died, but her mother and her siblings survived with injuries and burns. For months, her family were in the hospital and having surgery. After the tragedy, she became a nurse to her family, and a year later, her twin sons were born. The tragedy shaped her life, and she believes it made her engage with life.

She graduated from Universidad San Francisco de Quito with a degree in communication. She has a master's degree in education, and obtained her doctorate in Argentina in education at the National University of Rosario.

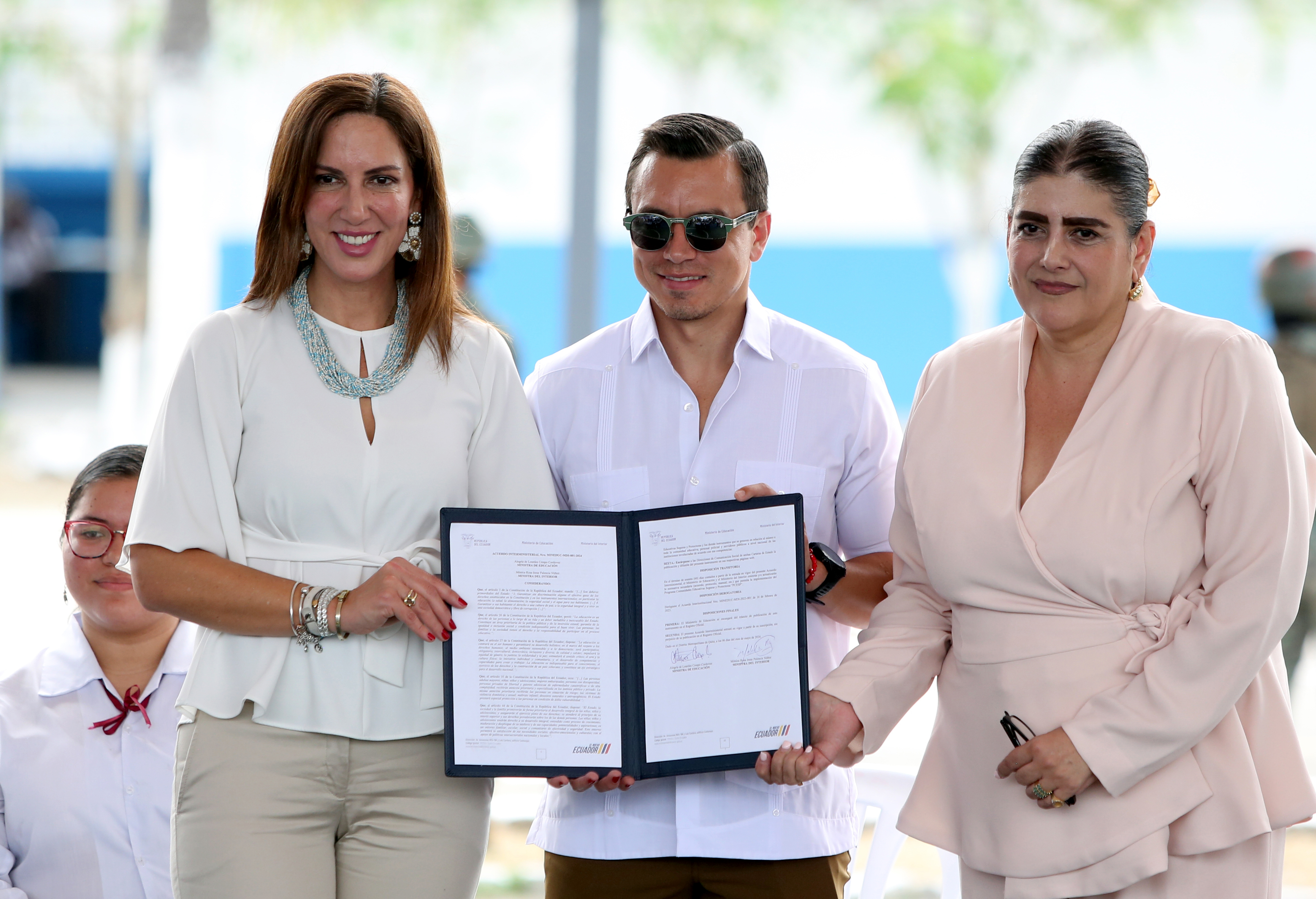
Alegría Crespo, President Nobea and the Minister of the Interior, Mónica Palencia, in May 2024

In 2024, she was a professor at SEK International University, looking after a master's course and she had been a vice principal at Quito's Johannes Kepler School since 2021. There was a referendum and presidential consultation in Ecuador in which 13 million citizens gave their backing, or not, to changes in the country, on 21 April 2024. The day after the referendum, President Noboa replaced part of Mónica Palencia's role with a replacement of Michele Sensi Contugi. Sensi Contugi became the Minister of Government, and Palencia, the Minister of the Interior. The next day, Noboa changed his Minister of Education. Crespo was appointed on 22 April 2024 to replace Daniel Calderón.

In February 2025, she signed agreements that required about 164,000 teachers to take part in a course titled "Sowing Values for a Future without Corruption". The purpose of the course, it is stated, is to improve the teaching of ethics and values to the nation's schoolchildren. She was working together with the Comptroller General of the State, Mauricio Torres, and the training would begin in weeks.
