= Flight 389 =

Flight 389 may refer to:

- United Air Lines Flight 389, crashed on August 16, 1965
- Cubana de Aviación Flight 389, crashed on 29 August 1998
