= Sonsoles Garcia =

Ecuadorian lawyer

Sonsoles García
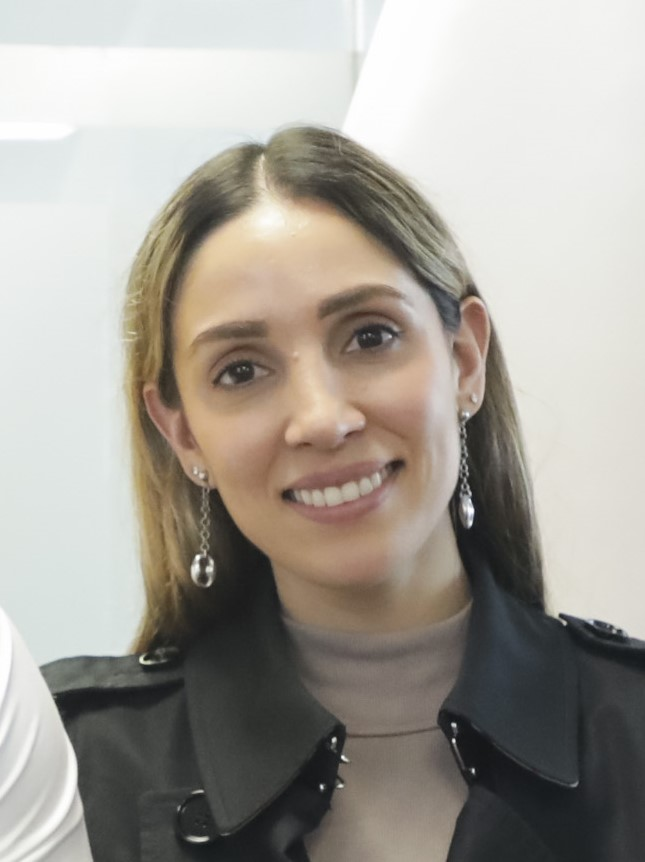
- Garcia in 2024
- Education: Universidad de Especialidades Espíritu Santo, Universidad Externado de Colombia.
- Occupations: lawyer and minister

María Sonsoles García León is an Ecuadorian lawyer who was a government minister from 2023 to 2024.

== Life ==
Garcia graduated from Universidad de Especialidades Espíritu Santo in 2013 and became a lawyer. . She has a master's degree in International Tax Law, Customs and Foreign Trade from the Universidad Externado de Colombia and a masters from the Erasmus University in Rotterdam. She was director of the Ecuadorian Federation of Exporters (FEDEXPOR) based in Guayaquil. She became a consultant offering advice to companies involved in exports in 2019 and she was a partner in a company called Comexec with the director of Quito's Chambre of Commerce. They were advising companies to move away from selling commodities and to move to more profitable value added products.

She became the Minister of Production and Foreign Trade in October 2023.

New ministers in the government included Ivonne Núñez, Monica Palencia, Zaida Rovira and Gabriela Sommerfeld.

Secretary Blinken with Gabriela Sommerfeld and Sonsoles García in December 2023

In December 2023 she and fellow minister Gabriela Sommerfeld met Antony Blinken the US Secretary of State. In the same month the Attorney General Diana Salazar Méndez had made arrests in Ecuador and in January the country was in crisis as the President announced an internal fight against several drug gangs after the prison escape of José Adolfo Macías Villamar.

In May 2024 Garcia was very optimistic about increased trade between Ecuador and the United Arab Emirates. A new agreement had been agreed she said that should increase trade and investment.

She resigned after eleven months as minister in October 2024.
