= Cubana de Aviación Flight 389 =

1998 aviation accident

Coordinates: 0.25°S 78.5833°W

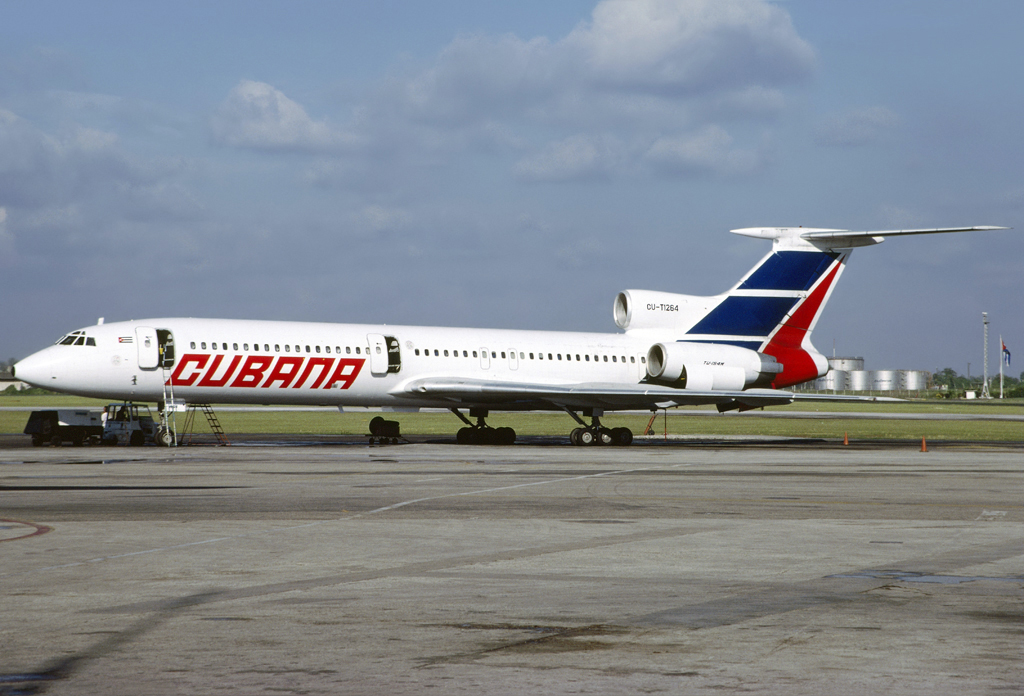
- CU-T1264, the aircraft involved in the accident, seen in 1997

Accident
- Date: 29 August 1998
- Summary: Crash after aborted takeoff due to pilot error
- Site: Near Mariscal Sucre International Airport, Quito, Ecuador
- Total fatalities: 80
- Total injuries: 55

Aircraft
- Aircraft type: Tupolev Tu-154M
- Operator: Cubana de Aviación
- IATA flight No.: CU389
- ICAO flight No.: CUB389
- Call sign: CUBANA 389
- Registration: CU-T1264
- Flight origin: Mariscal Sucre International Airport, Quito, Ecuador
- Stopover: Simón Bolívar International Airport, Guayaquil, Ecuador
- Destination: José Martí Airport, La Habana, Cuba
- Occupants: 91
- Passengers: 77
- Crew: 14
- Fatalities: 70
- Injuries: 21
- Survivors: 21

Ground casualties
- Ground fatalities: 10
- Ground injuries: 34

Cubana de Aviación Flight 389 (CU389/CUB389) was a scheduled international passenger flight, flying from the former Mariscal Sucre International Airport in Quito to Havana's José Martí International Airport, with a stopover at Simón Bolívar International Airport in Guayaquil, operated by Cuban flag carrier Cubana de Aviación.

On 29 August 1998, the aircraft operating the domestic Quito-Guayaquil leg of the flight, a Russian-made Tupolev Tu-154M overran the runway, smashing buildings and crashed into a soccer field in Quito while taking off from the airport. The aircraft burst into flames and 70 people on board were killed. A total of 10 people on the ground, including children, were killed.

The crash is the second-deadliest crash in the history of Ecuador after the 1983 TAME Flight 173's 119 fatalities.

== Aircraft ==
The aircraft was a Tupolev Tu-154M, serial number 85A720 and registered in Cuba as CU-T1264. It was manufactured by the Kuybyshev Aviation Plant in Kuybyshev, Soviet Russia, today the Aviakor plant in Samara, Russia. The aircraft had first flown in December 1985 and was powered by three Soloviev D-30KU-154 turbofan engines. It was delivered to Cubana de Aviación in February 1986 and by the time of the crash, the airframe had reportedly accumulated 9,256 flight hours.

== Passengers and crew ==
The aircraft was carrying 91 people, consisting of 14 crew and 77 passengers. It was piloted by Mario Ramos (commander), Leonardo Díaz (co-pilot) and Carlos González (flight engineer). Most of the occupants were Ecuadorians, with some Argentinians, Italians, Jamaicans, Chileans and Cubans.

=== Notable passengers ===
Among the passengers killed in the accident was 27-year-old Maita Madriñan Guayasamín, grand-daughter of renowned Ecuadorian painter Oswaldo Guayasamín. Madriñan, married to Chilean citizen Alejandro Sule (also spelled "Zule"), was traveling with her 4-year-old daughter Alejandra and her 4-month-old son Martín, both of whom were Guayasamín's great-grandchildren. Both Sule-Madriñan children were also the grandchildren of Anselmo Sule, a leader of Radical Party of Chile and a former legislator. Moreover, Madriñan was also the granddaughter of Ecuadorian politician and former government minister Alfredo Vera, who also lost his grand nephew Emilio in the crash. The family of Alegría Crespo, the future Minister of Education, were on board and her father died in the accident.

== Accident ==
=== Events ===
Flight 389 was preparing for departure. During the first engine start, a pneumatic valve was blocked. The crew rectified the issue, and two engines were started with ground power. According to testimony from some surviving passengers, the plane may have attempted to start its engines up to five times, which led some passengers to try to go the cockpit to complain to the pilots. Eventually, the plane started taxing, and the third engine was started. Flight 389 later received take-off clearance and began its roll. When it reached V_{R} speed, the nose of the aircraft wouldn't rotate (lift). The crew initiated a rejected take-off procedure, but the aircraft overran the runway, narrowly missed the heavily traveled Tufiño Avenue at the end of the airport runway into the middle-class El Rosario residential neighborhood, slammed into a wall, clipped an auto mechanic shop, smashed into two houses and plowed into a soccer field. At the time, many people, including children, were playing on the field. The aircraft exploded and burst into flames.

=== Rescue efforts ===
Rescuers reached the crash site and began evacuating survivors. Explosions could be heard repeatedly after the crash. Firefighters directed jets of water at the smoking ruins to prevent additional explosions, and local authorities cordoned off the crash site and searched for missing local residents, three of whom were later found under the plane's wreck. Emergency crews rushed 26 injured people to three hospitals, with 15 taken to the Quito Metropolitan Hospital. Survivors stated that some doors on the plane wouldn't open after impact and several survivors escaped from the fiery wreckage through a hole in the fuselage. Several people jumped from the plane while they were on fire. On Sunday, 30 August, the Ecuadorian Red Cross stated that as many as 77 badly burned bodies had been recovered from the crash site. Five children playing on the field were killed as the plane plowed into them. Local resident Elvira San Martín lost her three children, who were reportedly playing in the terrain where the plane slammed into.

Shortly after the crash, Mariscal Sucre International Airport was closed and flight operations were canceled in response to the crash. Newly-inaugurated Ecuadorian President Jamil Mahuad, who had just taken office 19 days before, visited the crash site and expressed his solidarity to the next of kin and relatives of the victims of the crash. Mahuad ordered a full report on the cause of the crash and said he would build a new airport away from the city, as the airport had been criticized for being too close to a densely populated area.

=== Previous tragedies and close calls ===
The concerns about the airport's location and its danger were not without merit or merely a consequence of the Cubana accident. On 18 September 1984, AECA Flight 767-103 also overran the runway after a failed takeoff, slamming into several houses at the end of the runway 17 (start of runway 35), opposite to where the Cubana plane would crash 14 years later. The crash killed the four crewmembers and almost 50 people on the ground.

Two years before the CU389, and in a similar fashion, on 1 May 1996 an overloaded Fly Linhas Aéreas Boeing 727, which carried the Brazilian Corinthians football team to Portovelo (and also with a stopover at Guayaquil) had also overran runway 35 (start of runway 17) after a rejected take-off in rainy conditions, hit the ILS installation, went down a slope or embankment, hit the airport perimeter wall and came to rest between Tufiño avenue and the airport terrain. There were no fatalities among the 79 passengers and 11 crew, but six people were injured and the plane was written off.

== Investigation ==
=== Initial speculation ===
The plane's mechanical fitness was initially questioned, as at that time Cubana de Aviación was operating within the restrictions and difficulties that Cuba was experiencing in the context of the so-called Special Period that the island was going through after the fall of the Soviet Union. This period of generalized socioeconomic crisis, following the end of the Cold War and the end of Soviet support to the Fidel Castro regime, also affected the aeronautical industry, especially Cubana.

In this context, as one of the few remaining operators of Soviet passenger planes in the Western Hemisphere at the time, Cubana struggled to keep these aircraft airworthy. Spare parts had to be paid for with US dollars, which were hard and scarce to obtain during the 1990s crisis. This latter task was especially difficult given a long-standing US commercial embargo and other economic sanctions put in place against the island's Communist regime since the 1960s. Consequently, Cubana resorted to carrying its own Soviet-trained technicians and mechanics aboard flights and cannibalizing airframes from other Soviet-built aircraft in its fleet to keep other aircraft of the same origin in the air during the 1990s.

Eventually, the head of Ecuador's General Directorate of Civil Aviation (DGAC), Ecuadorian Air Force general Oswaldo Domínguez, announced that Cuban records showed that "the plane was totally in compliance. There are records of all the inspections and obligatory maintenance procedures." He further ruled out the possibility of a bomb or a terrorist attack but reported: "signs that the motors were put in reverse."

=== Post-crash fire ===
The post-crash fire was more determinative in the tragedy than the actual runway overrun and crash. Several testimonies recalled how passengers initially survived the crash but later struggled to evacuate the plane on fire, with several dying as a consequence. Surviving passengers' testimonies, for instance, reported that two stewardesses survived the crash and helped some passengers to evacuate but were later killed by the fire. Another local resident testified that passengers' cries for help continued after the crash until "the final explosion came and [then] everything was quiet." The fire's intense heat, with flames reaching up to 150 feet into the air, also hampered locals' initial rescue efforts. The whole ordeal led a local resident to claim that "people didn't die from injuries. They died from the explosion and fire."

== Aftermath ==
=== Legal and diplomatic proceedings ===
Ecuador's State Attorney, Milton Álava, said the government was considering suing Cubana de Aviación. He said that "if Cubana de Aviación does not comply with the obligations imposed on all aviation companies, the Ecuadorian state will have to sue the Cuban government for the necessary reparations through diplomatic channels, which would be preferable, by direct action from government to government or by direct (judicial) lawsuit." At the same time, the Prosecutor's Office of Pichincha, whose capital is Quito, reported that it was determined to inquire on "the details of what happened in the moments prior to the instant of the accident "to determine alleged perpetrators."

The Cuban ambassador in Quito, René Castro, for his part, announced that the director of the Cuban Aeronautics, General Rogelio Acevedo, would arrive in Ecuador to discuss solutions to the problems caused by the accident. Castro said his country was willing to help the injured and even cover the costs of recovery on the island. He said that "there is no one more interested than Cuba, which still has many of these planes, in knowing what has happened and what were the factors that led to that outcome." Ecuador State Attorney Álava earlier said he had asked the Cuban government to certify the mechanical and operational condition of not only the crashed plane, but the entire Tupolev fleet.

Cubana's insurer was supposed to cover all expenses for the victims' hospitalisation and burial, as well as compensation for the deceased's relatives, Álava said. The insurer reportedly offered $20,000 for each victim, but that amount was not accepted because, according to State Attorney Álava, the fair amount would be $ 50,000 for each one. However, it is unknown how much, if any, compensation was eventually paid, or whether any legal or criminal proceedings were initiated against the airline.

=== Safety zone ===
As a safeguard against another tragedy, the DGAC commenced a series of earthworks in 1999 to build a runway safety area (a.k.a. "safety zone" or a "safety and stop zone") in the immediate and adjacent areas to the start of runway 17, from where Flight 389 had strayed off after its ill-fated, aborted take-off. The project, which involved private and public property expropriation, erected a horizontal berm-like platform of 280 meters long and 92 meters wide that increased the runway excursion space for planes to stop in case of a rejected takeoff or a botched landing.

The safety zone covered (and thus shielded) all or part of the places through which the Cubana Tu-154 had wreaked havoc before stopping. This was mainly the case for Tufiño Avenue, which circles the runway 17 start and, because the safety zone was erected over it, had a two-way tunnel built to allow vehicular traffic under the new structure. Nearby streets and other surrounding residential areas and businesses were also protected from potential tragedies by the new construction. The safety zone was finished and inaugurated in mid-July 2000.

=== New airport ===
In the end, despite the construction of the safety zone being carried out during his time in office, President Mahuad's earlier promise to build a new airport did not come to fruition during his tenure, which coincided with the start of a severe socioeconomic and political crisis that eventually led to Mahuad being ousted in a coup in 2000. The new airport only began construction in 2006 and was finally opened in February 2013, nearly 15 years after the CU389 tragedy, located about 18 kilometres (11 mi; 9.7 nmi) east of Quito, way outside its urban area.

== See also ==
- 1996 Air Africa crash
- Munich air disaster
- LAPA Flight 3142
- Tower Air Flight 41
