= UIO (disambiguation) =

UIO may refer to:

- University of Oslo (in Norwegian: Universitetet i Oslo)
- Mariscal Sucre International Airport, in Quito, Ecuador
  - Old Mariscal Sucre International Airport, which was replaced by the above
