= Carolina Jaramillo (Ecuador) =

Ecuadorian presidential spokesperson

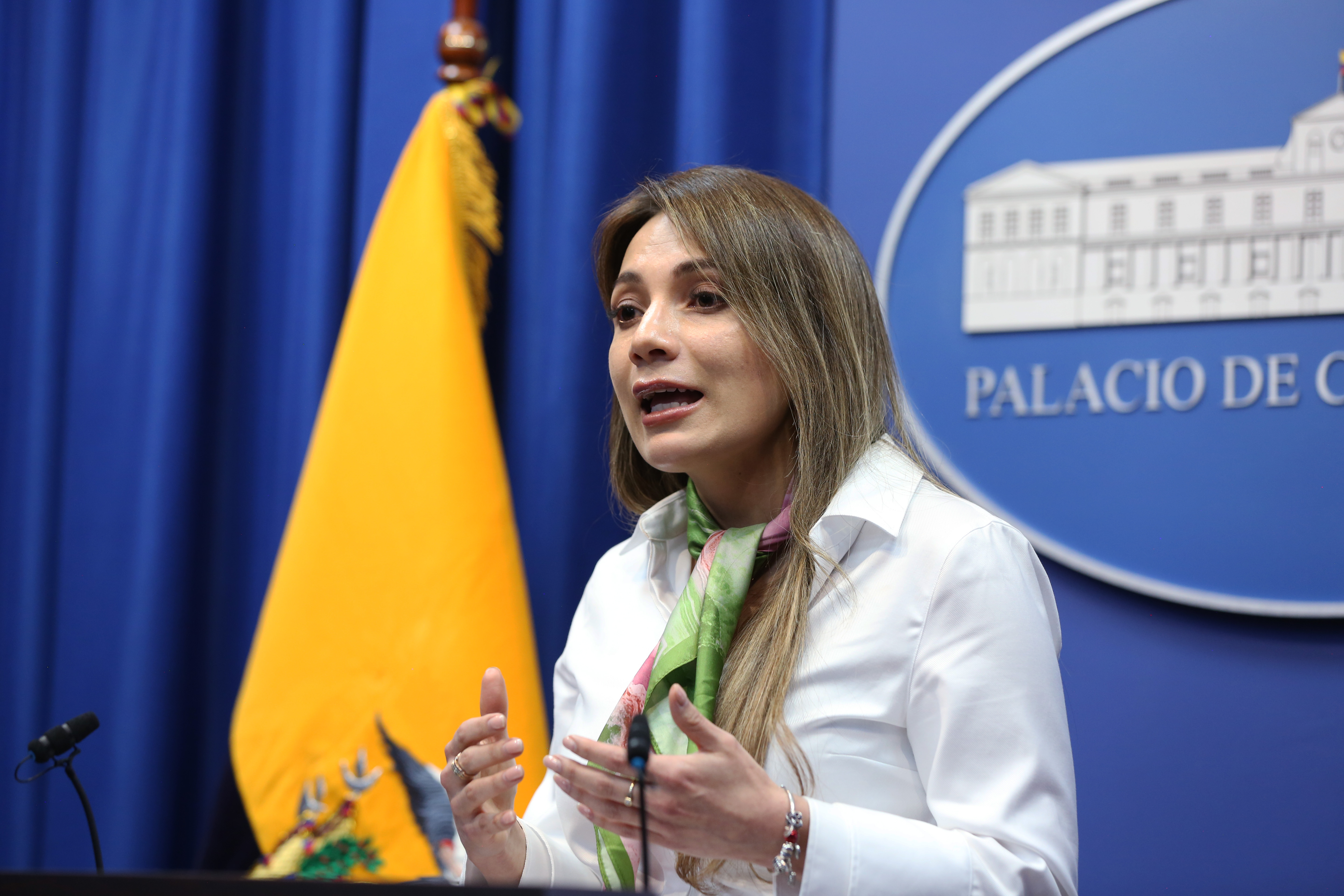
- Born: c.1985
- Occupation: Spokesperson
- Known for: Presidential spokesperson from 2025

Carolina Jaramillo (born c.1985) became the Ecuadorian presidential spokesperson in 2025.

== Life ==
She was born in 1985 and she graduated before taking a masters in social sciences with a minor in communication.

From 2015 she worked within the government during the Presidency of Rafael Correa and then from 2018 President Lenin Moreno. She has worked at the National Assembly and the Ministry of Defence. She came to notice in 2025 when she was appointed, aged forty, as the Presidential spokesperson. This was the first creation of this role within the Noboa presidency although when he was first President he did empower the Minister of Government, José de la Gasca, and the Foreign Minister Gabriela Sommerfeld to speak on the President's behalf.

Her first announcements were from Palacio de Carondelet and they concerned changes to mining, electricity charging and subsidies.
