= Arianna Tanca =

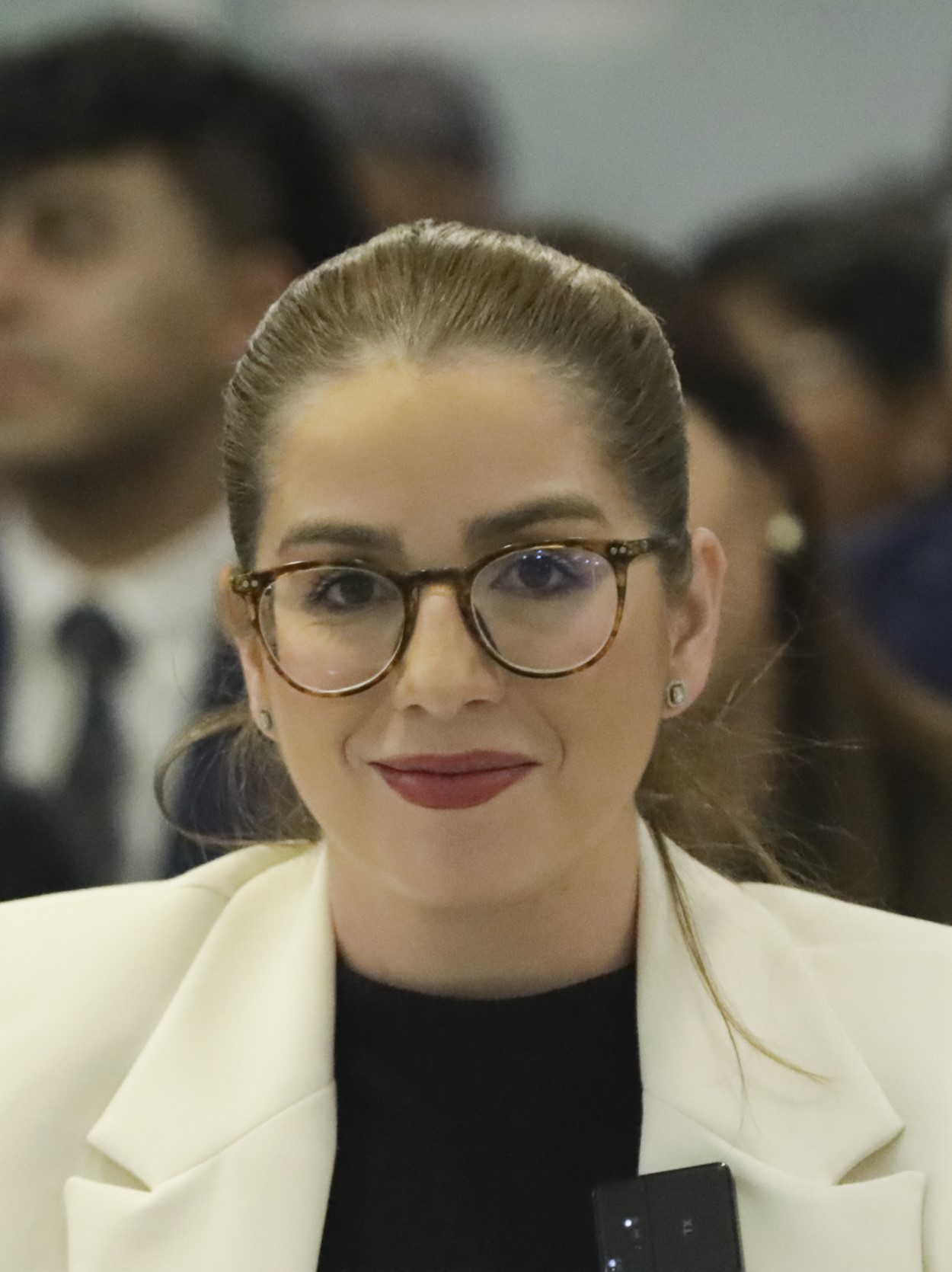
- Minister
- Born: c.1993
- Education: Universidad Casa Grande
- Occupations: political scientist and Government minister
- Known for: Ecuador's Minister for Women and Human Rights

Arianna Tanca Macchiavello is a political analyst who became a government minister. She was involved in commenting on the 2023 Ecuadorian general election and at the end in November 2023, the winner, Daniel Noboa, invited her to became the Ecuadorian Minister of Women and Human Rights.

== Life ==
Tanca obtained her degree in political science and international relations at Casa Grande University in Guayaquil.

In August 2023 Fernando Villavicencio, who was a candidate for the presidential election, was assassinated and Tanca, as a political commentator, was providing context to the listeners of the AirTalk broadcasts. In September 2023 the second round of the Presidential election was in progress and Tanca was reporting on the race.

Daniel Noboa was elected president and he invited her to become a minister when he took office. Many were announced that day and she was one of the last to be sworn in at the Palacio de Carondelet. She noted that Noboa was at least "changing one life at a time". Fellow ministers in the new government included Yvonne Nunez, Sonsoles Garcia, Romina Muñoz, Monica Palencia and Gabriela Sommerfeld. Tanca was then 30 years old and the second youngest minister, as her fellow minister Sade Fritschi was 26. Tanca had argued before she became Ecuador's Minister for Women and Human Rights in 2023 that it was demeaning to be chosen for office just because you have ovaries. Mónica Banegas Cedillo who was the executive director of the Observatory of Political Violence against Women argued that Ecuador's imposition of gender parity in politics was necessary because political organisations are not far sighted enough. Research existed that showed that even with the parity offer a smaller number of women put themselves forward for elections to mayor in Ecuador.

In March 2024 she was involved in the announcements of new laws designed to reduce the incidence of femicide in Ecuador. The initiative is in line with the targets of the United Nations, and it is supported by funding from the United States and the European Union. Six Violet centres were to be opened, and grants of up to $5000 would be made available to 400 women. She said there were 59 cases of femicide in Ecuador in 2024.
