= Mónica Palencia =

Ecuadorian politician

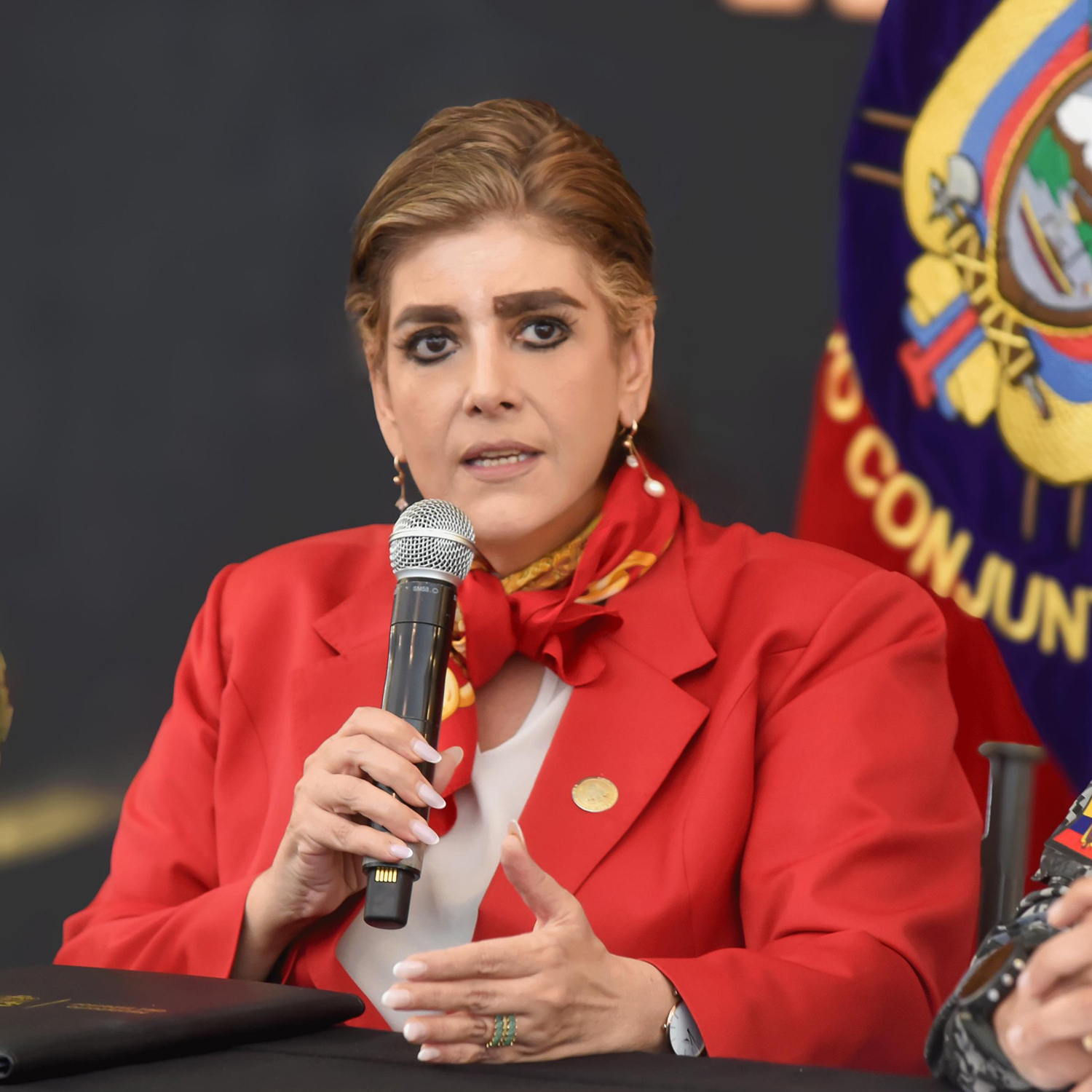

Mónica Rosa Irene Palencia Núñez is a Mexican-born lawyer who emigrated as an adult to Ecuador. She became the Ecuadorian Minister of the Interior and a citizen of Ecuador in 2023.

== Life ==
Mónica Rosa Irene Palencia Núñez was born in the state of Durango in Mexico. Her father, Héctor Alfredo Palencia Alonso, was a lawyer. He directed the Institute of Culture of the State of Durango. She is an alumnus of Durango's Juárez University, graduating with a law degree. She lived in Durango until she was 21. She then emigrated to Ecuador where she continued her education in Guayaquil where she obtained a master's degree.

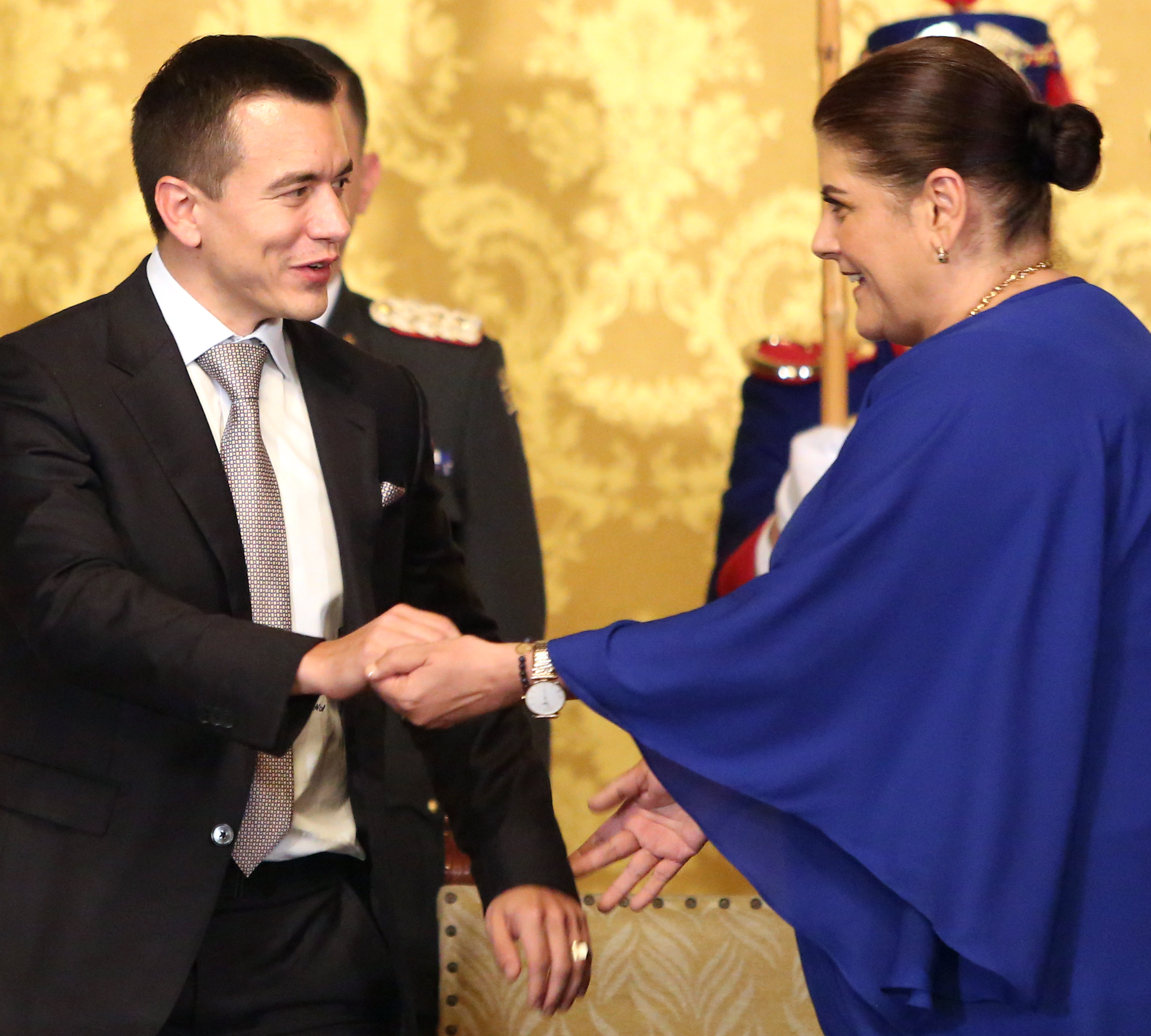
New President Daniel Noboa with his new minister, 23 November 2023

She had lived in Ecuador "for more than forty years" and she became a citizen of Ecuador in 2023 "minutes before" she joined the government. On 23 November she was chosen by the new president, Daniel Noboa, to become a government minister. She became the Minister of the Interior and the Minister for Government. Fellow ministers in the new government included Yvonne Nunez, Zaida Rovira, Arianna Tanca, Sonsoles Garcia, Romina Muñoz and Gabriela Sommerfeld. In April 2024 she was confirmed as the Minister of the Interior, with Michele Sensi Contugi taking over her role as the Minister for Government.

One of her ministerial trips was back to Mexico where she spoke of the new Ecuadorian President's regard for democracy. A disgraced ex-vice President of Ecuador, Jorge Glas, who had asylum, was sheltering from justice inside the Mexican embassy. He was arrested by force by police without the permission of Mexico. Palencia was allegedly involved in ordering the arrest within the Mexican embassy. The President of Mexico, Andrés Manuel López Obrador, complained about the infringement of international law and broke off diplomatic relations but he said that he would not be labelling Palencia a traitor.

Palencia faced impeachment over her role in the arrest of a disgraced politician inside the Mexican Embassy. Independent assembly member Lucía Posso noted that the law was being used to control politicians but ministers must face that this was necessary as the executive must "be accountable to the Plenary". On 3 September the assembly passed a resolution that delayed the impeachment of Palencia.

There was a referendum in Ecuador on 21 April 2024, and the following day President Noboa replaced part of Palencia's role with Michel Sensi Contugi, the Minister of Government. The next day he also replaced the Minister of Education; Alegría Crespo was appointed on 22 April 2024 to replace Daniel Calderón.
