= Romina Muñoz =

Former museum director and Minister of Culture in Ecuador

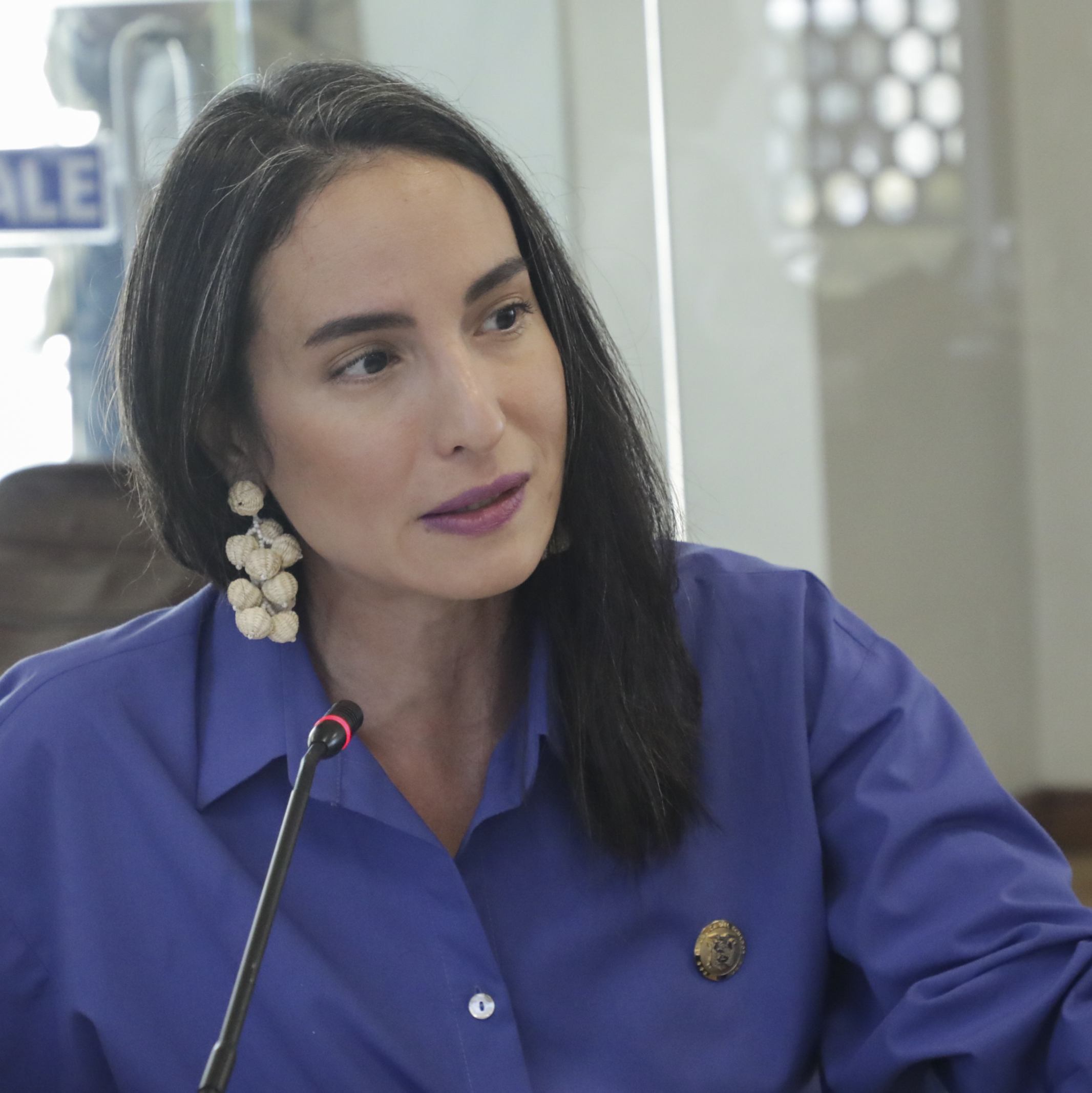
- Minister
- Born: 1984 (age 41–42); Guayaquil
- Education: ITAE Instituto Tecnológico Superior de Artes; Universidad Casa Grande; ESPOL
- Occupations: Museum director; politician
- Known for: Minister of Culture

Romina Muñoz Procel (born 1984) is an Ecuadorian former museum director who became the Minister of Culture in Ecuador in 2023.

== Life ==
Muñoz was born in 1984 in Guayaquil. She was educated in the Visual Arts at the Pontificia Universidad Católica del Ecuador. She also has a master's degree in neotropical archaeology from the Escuela Superior Politécnica del Litoral.

Muñoz led the National Museum of Ecuador (MuNa) starting in June 2021. She created an exhibition titled 'Polyfonia' featuring the work of the artist, Alba Calderón, within the Casa de la Cultura Ecuatoriana in Quito when she was the head of the national museum from 2021 to 2023.

She pointed out that MuNa was serving the government more than the people and it did not have its own building in September 2023 and that ended her job at the museum. She spoke out while opening another exhibition she had created for the artist Judith Gutiérrez. She also complained that the museum's staff were not permanent employees. She said that she was sacked the next day. The existing museum is run by the Ministry of Culture which had existed for sixteen years but the relationship was in her opinion confused and the existing location in the Casa de la Cultura Ecuatoriana was inappropriate for an enterprising national museum.

She became the Minister of Culture in Ecuador in 2023 when Daniel Noboa was elected president. Fellow ministers in the new government included Ivonne Núñez, Arianna Tanca, Monica Palencia and Gabriela Sommerfeld. One of her first priorities was the Museo Antropologico y de Arte Contemporaneo (MAAC) in Guayaquil. She also found funds to send staff to learn techniques at other institutions: five people were being sent to France, one to a Spanish museum and another to a museum in Mexico. The previous administration's idea of creating a Teatro del Barrio was making slow progress and her project of finding a new building for the national museum was also being planned in 2024.
