= Ivonne Núñez =

Ecuadorian lawyer and Minister

Ivonne Núñez Figueroa
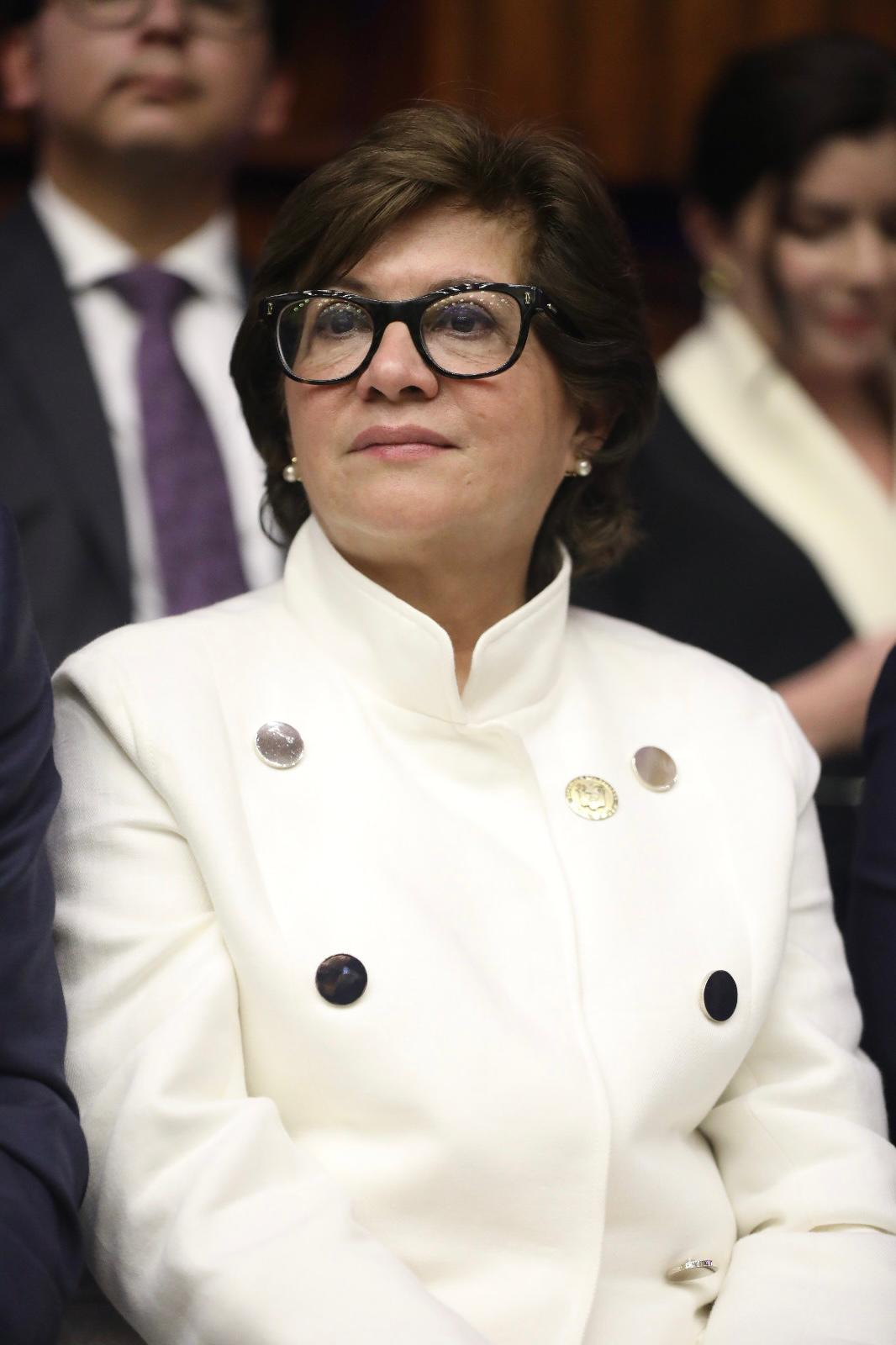
- Posesión Presidencial de Daniel Noboa Azín Período 2025-2029

Minister of Labor of Ecuador
- Incumbent
- Assumed office November 2023
- President: Daniel Noboa Azín

Personal details
- Born: March 8, 1967 (age 59) Ecuador
- Education: University of Guayaquil; Universidad Espíritu Santo (UEES)
- Profession: Lawyer

Ivonne Núñez Figueroa is an Ecuadorian lawyer by profession, with diplomas in international and Ecuadorian economics. She holds master's degrees in international business and foreign trade, as well as in constitutional law. She practiced law for over 16 years before being appointed as a Judge in the areas of criminal, traffic, and juvenile law. She was later assigned as an Appellate Judge in the Labor Chamber. Since November 2023, she has served as the Minister of Labor in the government of President Daniel Noboa Azin.

== Life ==
Núñez became a qualified lawyer and she has a doctorate from the Argentinian University of Mar del Plata. She became a judge at the Provincial Court of Justice of Guayas.

In 2016 Núñez was accused along with four other judges of having interfered with cases in the Criminal and Labor Chambers. All five of them lost their positions as judges. She took on the case of Ricardo Rivera. She was the first defense lawyer for Ricardo Rivera who had been accused of money laundering. This was high profile as Ecuador's 48th Vice President Jorge Glas was Ricardo Rivera's nephew. Glas went to jail for corruption by Odebrecht. The constitutional court restored her position as a judge after two years. Ricardo Rivera was later defended by Aníbal Quinde.

In November 2023 she was chosen by Ecuador's new president, Daniel Noboa, to be the Minister of Labour. She and the rest of the President's cabinet were sworn in on 23 November 2023. She took over from Patricio Donoso. Fellow ministers in the new government included Romina Muñoz, Arianna Tanca, Monica Palencia and Gabriela Sommerfeld.

In December 2023 Núñez made a unilateral decision to raise the Unified Basic Salary by ten dollars per month to $460 in line with projected inflation figures. The decision should have been made by the National Council of Labor and Employment but they failed to come to a decision.

Núñez was elected to be the President of Ecuador's Archery Federation by the leading archery clubs. and she served on a commission of the American Boxing Confederation. She has run marathons.
