= Universidad de Especialidades Espíritu Santo =

University in Guayaquil, Ecuador

Coordinates: 2.13256°S 79.86817°W

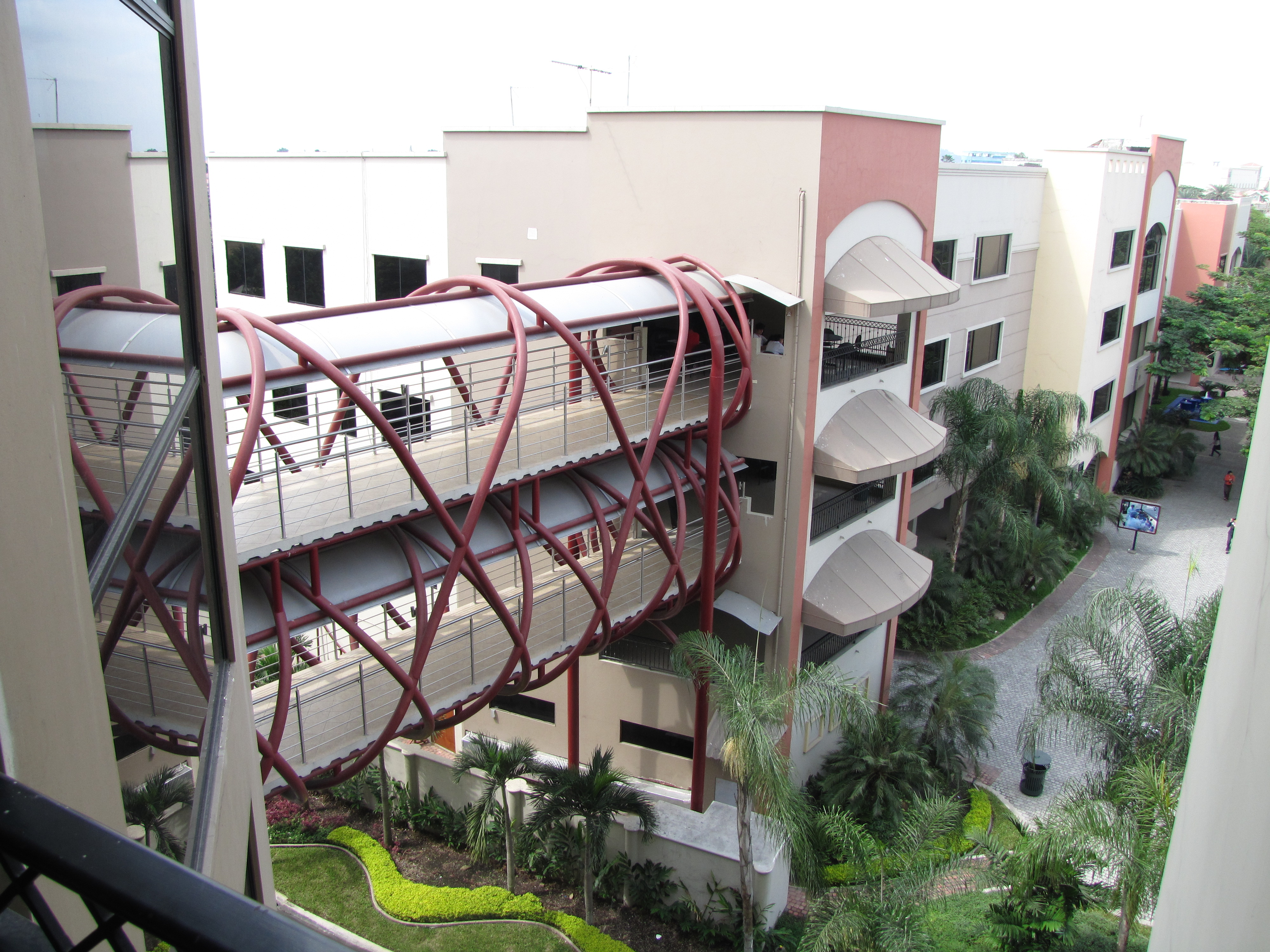
- UEES Building E
- Motto: Non progredi regredi est (Latin)
- Motto in English: Not going forward is going backwards
- Type: Private
- Established: 1993; 33 years ago
- President: Dr Carlos Ortega Maldonado
- Undergraduates: 5,000
- Location: Guayaquil, Guayas, Ecuador
- Campus: Suburban
- Website: www.uees.edu.ec

Universidad de Especialidades Espíritu Santo (UEES) is a non-profit private university in Guayaquil, Ecuador. Its campus is in Samborondón, Greater Guayaquil. One distinctive program of UEES is the College of International Studies, home to the International Careers Program (ICP), which offers courses entirely in English, the School of Translation and Interpretation, the School of Foreign Languages and Applied Linguistics, and the Center for International Education.

Founded by Dr. Carlos Ortega Maldonado, it was accredited by CONESUP, then the Ecuadorian higher education governing agency.

== History ==
UEES was founded in 1993, approved by the Ecuadorian Higher Education governing agency (CONESUP) and by then Ecuadorian President Sixto Durán-Ballén, and officially inaugurated at an opening ceremony a year later, with Dr. Carlos Ortega Maldonado appointed as the first chancellor.

Initially, UEES offered career programs through its Faculty of Economics and Business Science. The first full-time students were registered in 1995, some of them on a merit-based scholarship scheme known as Plan Talento. The Faculty of Law, Policy, and Development was added in 1997, along with the International Degree Program, created for students wishing to study entirely in English while at UEES and to transfer credits and complete their studies at other international or English-speaking universities.

University rankings

Global – Overall
- QS World: 951-1000 (2026)

As UEES moved into its new campus in 2001, new faculties were established for Computer Sciences, Telecommunications, and Electronics, and the Faculty of Liberal Arts and Sciences. In the next few years the faculties of Communication (2001), Architecture and Design (2002), Tourism and Hotel Management (2003), and International Studies (2004) were founded.

== Alumni ==
Sonsoles Garcia who studied law here became Ecuador's Minister of Production and Foreign Trade in October 2023.
