= Fly Linhas Aéreas =

Brazilian airline

IATA	ICAO	Call sign
4H	FLB	AEREAFLY
- Founded: August 25, 1995
- Ceased operations: 2003
- Headquarters: Rio de Janeiro, Brazil

Fly Linhas Aéreas was a Brazilian airline which operated between 1995 and 2003.

== History ==
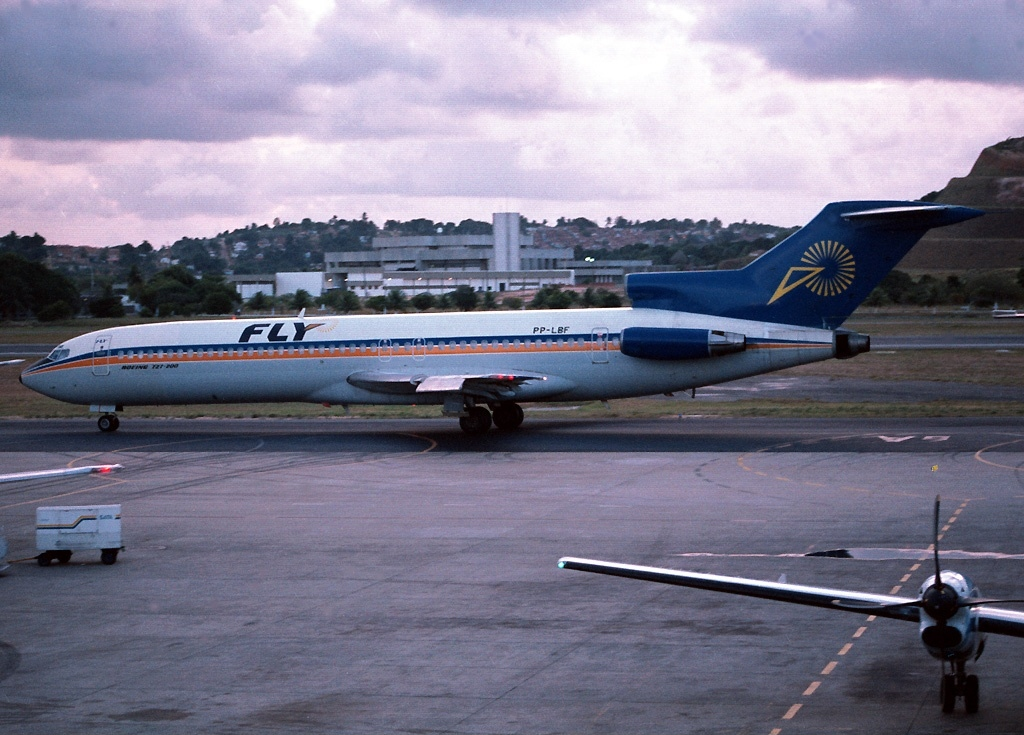
A Fly Linhas Aéreas Boeing 727-200 at Recife in 1998

The airline began operations on August 25, 1995, with a Boeing 727-200 as a charter carrier linking Rio de Janeiro and São Paulo to holiday destinations in the northeast of Brazil. Originally it was a direct competitor of Air Vias, another Brazilian airline dedicated to charter flights. Eventually Fly became a carrier with both charter and scheduled low-cost operations.

Though successful in its first years, it suffered a hard economic blow during the 1999 currency exchange devaluation crisis, and a great decrease in traffic, following a world trend, in the second semester of 2001. Those difficulties led to increasing administrative difficulties. The final blow came with increasing competition with Gol Airlines which led to the ceasing of operations in 2003.

== Destinations ==
At the time of closure, Fly operates 5 domestic destinations within Brazil:

- Fortaleza – Pinto Martins International Airport
- Natal – Augusto Severo International Airport
- Recife – Guararapes/Gilberto Freyre International Airport
- Rio de Janeiro – Galeão/Antonio Carlos Jobim International Airport
- São Paulo – Guarulhos/Gov. André Franco Montoro International Airport

== Fleet ==
FLY fleet
Aircraft	Total	Years of operation	Notes
Boeing 727-200	4	1995–2003	

== Accidents ==
- On May 1, 1996, Fly Linhas Aereas Flight 7747, a charter flight transporting the Corinthians soccer club back to Brazil after defeating Ecuador's ESPOLI at Quito's Atahualpa Stadium that same day in the first round of Match D of that year's Copa Libertadores, overran the runway after aborting takeoff from Quito's Mariscal Sucre International Airport during rainy weather. The Boeing 727 hit the airport's ILS installation, went down a slope, and then broke through an airport perimeter wall before coming to rest between a nearby avenue facing a residential area and the airport terrain. Although a small fire erupted and smoke entered the plane's cabin, it was quickly extinguished, and there were no fatalities among the 11 crew and the 79 passengers, among them team directives, journalists, fans, and the coaching staff. However, six people were injured, among them goalkeeper Nei, defense Alexandre Lopes, and midfielder Tupãzinho, who, already with an injury, suffered burns in his left leg. The plane had been overloaded by 9700 kilograms due to calculation and planning errors by the airline, as later determined by Ecuador's Directorate General of Civil Aviation.

== See also ==
- List of defunct airlines of Brazil
