= Gabriela Sommerfeld =

Ecuadorian foreign minister

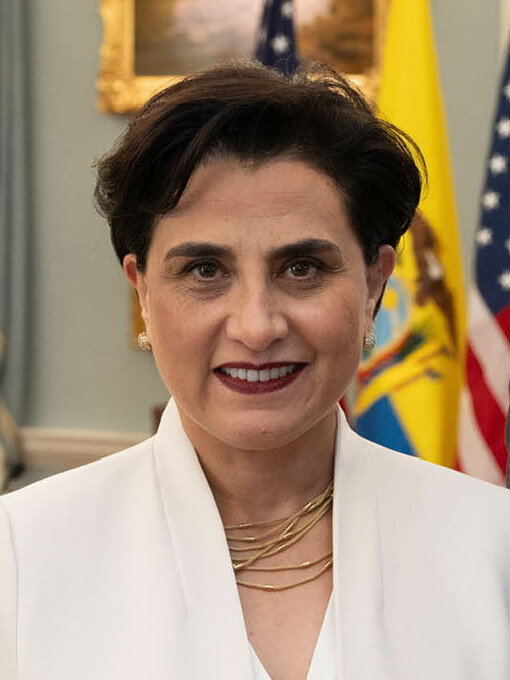
- Sommerfeld in 2023
- Education: Universidad San Francisco de Quito; Instituto Tecnológico de Monterrey
- Known for: Ecuador's foreign minister

María Gabriela Sommerfeld Rosero became the Ecuadorian foreign minister in 2023. She led tourism for Quito, and had been the CEO of multiple airlines and a leading hotel.

== Life ==
Sommerfeld pursued her higher education at the Universidad San Francisco de Quito and subsequently obtained a Master of Business Administration (MBA) from the Instituto Tecnológico de Monterrey in Mexico. In 2002, Sommerfeld was President of the Ecuadorian airline Aerogal, which was later integrated into Avianca Ecuador. Under her leadership, the company played an active role in the expansion and modernization of Ecuador's aviation sector.

In 2016, she headed the Tourism Department of the City of Quito, a position she held during a particularly challenging period marked by a devastating earthquake. Although Quito itself was largely spared from destruction, the disaster caused approximately three billion US dollars in damage nationwide and claimed nearly 500 lives. Despite the national crisis, Quito remained a vital tourist destination, welcoming around 700,000 visitors in 2015, underscoring the city's resilience and the strategic importance of tourism for Ecuador's economy.

In January 2022, Sommerfeld was appointed Chief Executive Officer (CEO) of Equair, a newly launched Ecuadorian airline. She led the company during its formative phase alongside Frederik Jacobsen, who was also named to an executive position. Prior to this role, she had already held several high-ranking posts within the aviation and hospitality industries.

By March 2023, Sommerfeld was CEO of a hotel in Quito. On 23 November 2023, at the Carondelet Palace, she was formally sworn in as Minister of Foreign Affairs and Human Mobility by President Daniel Noboa. Her appointment was part of the new administration's formation, which also included Mishel Mancheno as Legal secretary of the Presidency, Niels Olsen, Arianna Tanca, Ivonne Núñez, Mónica Palencia, and Zaida Rovira among other key cabinet members.

Secretary Blinken with Gabriela Sommerfeld and Sonsoles García in December 2023

In December 2023 she and Ecuador's Production and Trade Minister Sonsoles García met Antony Blinken the US Secretary of State. In the same month the Attorney General Diana Salazar Méndez had made arrests in Ecuador and in January the country was in crisis as the President announced an internal fight against several drug gangs after the prison escape of José Adolfo Macías Villamar. Sommerfeld was in Davos as the 60 day state of emergency unfolded.

Sommerfeld had to deal with the diplomatic fallout after President Nobea ordered a raid on the Mexican embassy on 5 April 2024 to retrieve the fugitive ex-vice-President Jorge Glas. Mexico broke off relations and appealled to the international community. Her impeachment was proposed in the National Assembly by Jhajaira Urresta. Urresta alleges that Sommerfeld had not carried out her duties because she did not stop the embassy raid. Ecuador's action was almost universally condemned by the Organization of American States. Sommerfeld agreed that this was a fair result, but Ecuador was not ready to apologise for its actions.

In October 2024 she announced that Ecuador would stop recognising the Sahrawi Arab Democratic Republic (SADR) as a country and she informed her opposite numbers in Morocco.
