= Old Mariscal Sucre International Airport =

Airport in Quito, Ecuador (1960–2013)

Mariscal Sucre International Airport Aeropuerto Internacional Mariscal Sucre
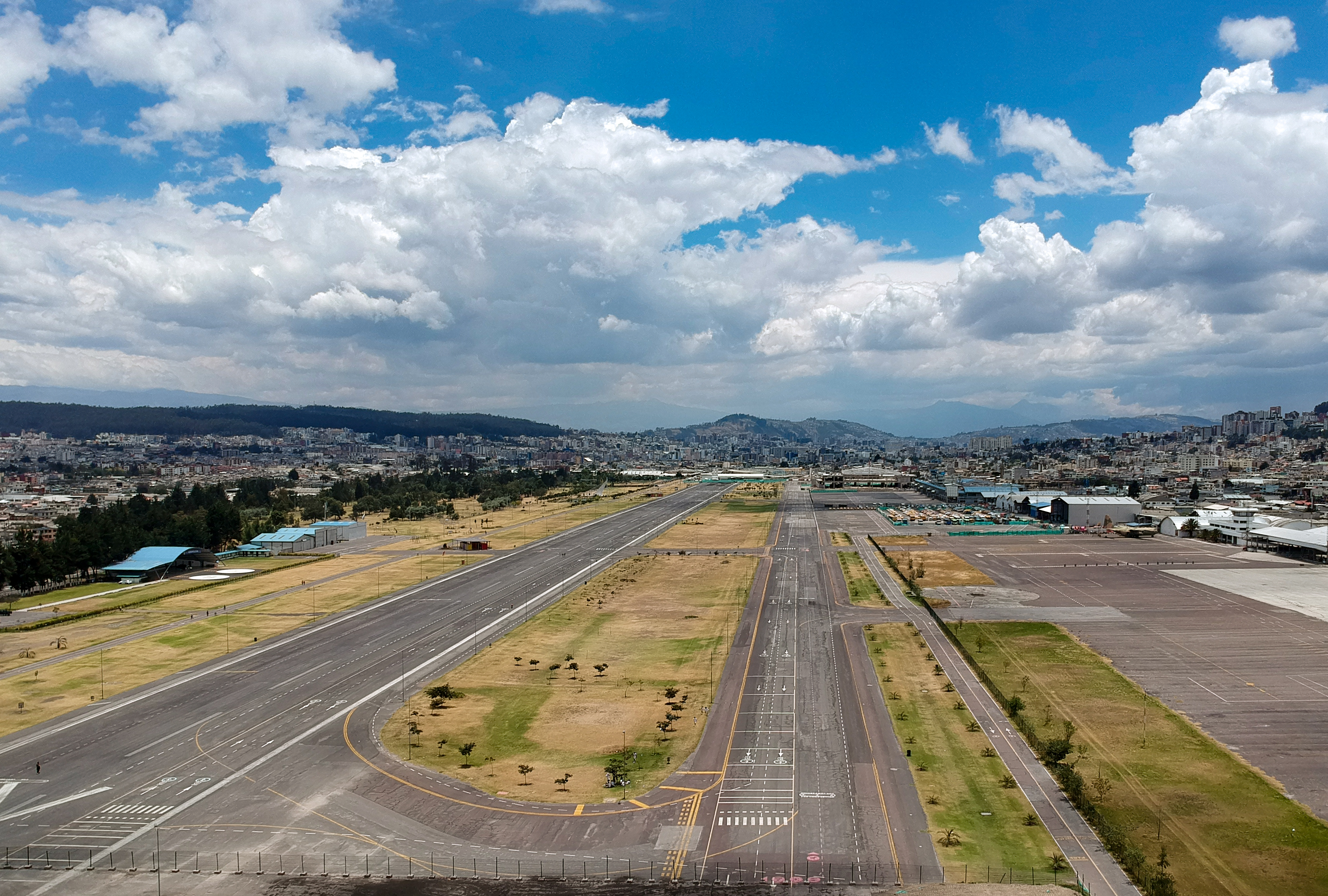
- IATA: ~~UIO~~; ICAO: ~~SEQU~~

Summary
- Airport type: Defunct
- Operator: Corporación Quiport S.A.
- Serves: ~~Quito~~
- Location: Chaupicruz, Quito Canton, Pichincha, Ecuador
- Opened: August 5, 1960; 66 years ago
- Closed: February 19, 2013; 13 years ago
- Elevation AMSL: 9,228 ft (2,813 m)
- Coordinates: 00°08′28″S 078°29′17″W
- Website: www.aeropuertoquito.aero

Map
- Location within Ecuador

Runways
Direction	Length		Surface
Direction	m	ft	Surface
~~17/35~~	~~3,120~~	~~10,236~~	~~Asphalt~~ (closed)

Statistics (2011)
- Passengers: 8,900,000 (approx)
- Source: DAFIF

Mariscal Sucre International Airport ~~(IATA: UIO, ICAO: SEQU)~~ was the main international airport that served Quito, Pichincha, Ecuador. It was the busiest airport in Ecuador by passenger traffic, by aircraft movement and by cargo movement, and one of the busiest airports in South America. It was named after Venezuelan-born Antonio José de Sucre, a hero of Ecuadorian and Latin American independence. It began operations on 5 August 1960, and during its last years of operation, handled about 6.2 million passengers and 164,000 metric tons of freight per year. The airport, one of the highest in the world (at 2,800 metres or 9,200 feet AMSL), was located in the northern part of the city, in the Chaupicruz parish, within five minutes of Quito's financial center; the terminals were located at the intersection of Amazonas and La Prensa avenues. Mariscal Sucre International was the largest hub for TAME with an average of 50 daily departures.

The old Mariscal Sucre International Airport ceased all operations at 19:00 on 19 February 2013, following the departure of TAME flight 321 to Guayaquil (scheduled for 18:55). Iberia operated the final international departure from the airport. On the morning of 20 February 2013, all operations moved to the new airport of the same name. The first domestic flights scheduled to arrive at the new airport were TAME Flight 302 originating in Guayaquil, and LAN Flight 2590 originating in Lima, Peru. The new airport is located in the Tababela parish, about 18 kilometres (11 mi) to the east of the city. It was constructed by a private consortium.

The former airport is now the site of Parque Bicentenario, the biggest urban park in Quito.

Due to its location in the middle of a city surrounded by mountains, the old airport could no longer be expanded to accommodate any larger aircraft or an increase in air traffic. Its operation posed risks; several serious accidents and incidents had occurred in years prior to its closure.

== History ==
In October and November 1999, the airport was forced to suspend operations for up to a week because activity at the Guagua Pichincha Volcano covered Quito in up to five thousand tons of volcanic ash, including the airport's runway, trapping several aircraft. Operations were temporarily moved to Latacunga Airport and Guayaquil Airport while crews carried out cleanup.

=== Runway safety area ===
The airport built a runway safety area in 1999–2000 after the crash of Cubana de Aviación Flight 389 in August 1998. The structure was erected in the immediate and adjacent areas to the start of runway 17 (end of runway 35), from where Flight 389 had strayed after its aborted take-off, which killed 81 people both in the jetliner and on the ground. The project, which involved private and public property expropriation, erected a horizontal berm-like platform 280 meters long and 92 meters wide that increased the runway excursion space for planes to stop in case of an aborted takeoff or a bad landing.

The safety zone covered all or part of the places the Cubana Tu-154 had passed through and destroyed before stopping. Tufiño Avenue, which circles the start of runway 17, had a two-way tunnel built to allow vehicular traffic under the new structure. Nearby streets and other surrounding residential areas and businesses were also protected from accidents by the new construction. The safety zone was finished and inaugurated in mid-July 2000.

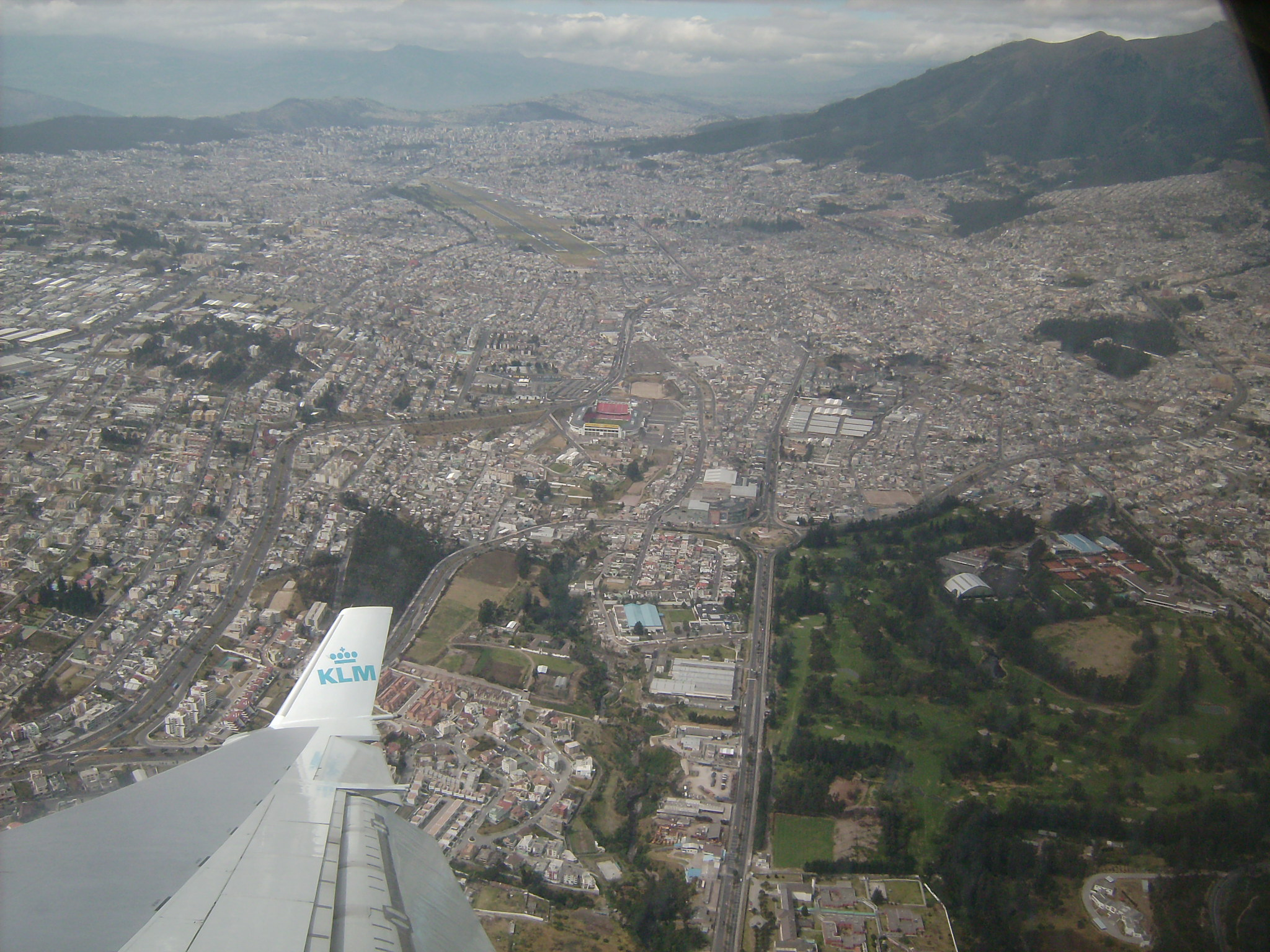
Old Airport (near the top of the image) spotted from a KLM MD-11 on approach to it in 2010.

== Accidents and incidents ==
- 27 October 2009: An Ecuadorian Air Force HAL Dhruv helicopter crashed during display maneuvers at Mariscal Sucre International Airport, with both pilots sustaining only minor scratches and no casualties. The aircraft was flying in military formation with two other helicopters.
- 29 August 1998: Cubana de Aviación Flight 389, a Tupolev Tu-154M overshot the runway, killing the 14-member crew, 56 of the 77 passengers and 10 people on the ground. The accident led to the construction of a runway safety area at the end of runway 35 (start of runway 17).
- 1 May 1996: Fly Linhas Aéreas Flight 7747, a Boeing 727-200, aborted takeoff in rainy weather, but overshot the runway and ended up in the middle of a road that lay at the end of runway 35. The aircraft was overloaded. On the plane were the players of a Brazilian Corinthians soccer team.
- 3 May 1995: The pilot of a Gulfstream II operated by American Jet, inbound from Buenos Aires via La Paz, selected the wrong VOR frequency during a nighttime approach to Quito; the jet flew 12 miles (19 km) further south than it should have, striking the Sincholagua volcano at 16,000 feet (4,900 m). All seven occupants were killed. The flight was carrying an important number of oil executives from Argentina and Chile to a meeting in Quito. Amongst those killed was Argentine YPF's CEO and president José Estenssoro, who had led privatization efforts under Carlos Menem; Juan Pedrals Gili, the Spanish-born general manager of Chilean ENAP as well as Manfred Hecht Mittersteiner, chief of production at ENAP's international subsidiary Sipetrol.
- 3 June 1988: an Ecuadorian Air Force North American Sabreliner NA265-40A crashed in Quito, killing all 11 people on board including the commander of the Ecuadorian Air Force, and a high-ranking officer of Israeli Air Force
- 7 November 1960: An AREA Ecuador Fairchild F-27A struck the dormant Atacazo volcano in bad weather during its approach to the newly opened Mariscal Sucre International Airport after a domestic flight from Simón Bolívar International Airport, in Guayaquil. The crash, 16 kilometres (9.9 mi) south of Quito and 150 meters to the summit of the Atacazo, killed all the 37 occupants of the plane. This particular aircraft (msn. 1, reg. HC-ADV) was the first prototype of the Fairchild F-27, which had been sold to AREA Ecuador in 1959. At the time, it was the worst aerial crash in the history of Ecuador, the first and worst fatal loss of an F-27, and the first accident involving the then-recently opened Quito airport.
