= Directorate General of Civil Aviation (Ecuador) =

Dirección General de Aviación Civil is the civil aviation authority of Ecuador. Its head office is in Quito.

The Gestión de Seguridad y Prevención Aeronáutica investigates aviation accidents and incidents.
