= Belén Tapia =

Ecuadorian politician

Ana Belén Tapia Vallejo
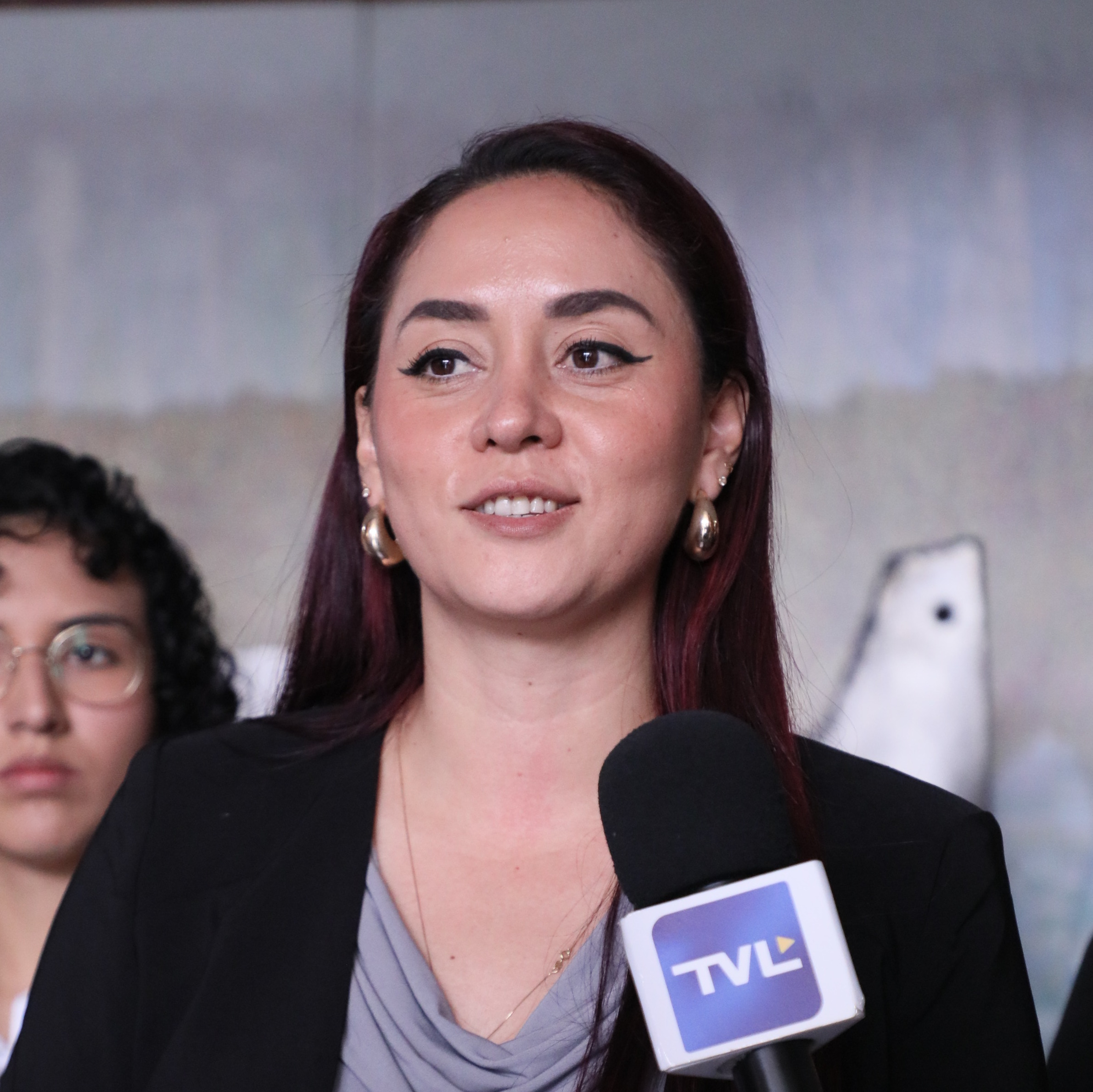
- in 2026
- Occupation: politician
- Known for: member of the National Assembly
- Political party: National Democratic Action

Ana Belén Tapia Vallejo is an Ecuadorian politician elected in 2025 to represent Napo Province in the National Assembly

== Life ==
She became a lawyer at the Autonomous Regional University of the Andes where she studied for her first and her masters degrees in law and particularly constitutional law.

In 2022 she became the coordinating official of Education for the provinces of Napo, Orellana and Pichincha (but not the city of Quito).

Tapia was elected in 2025 to represent Napo Province in the National Assembly. She is a member of the governing National Democratic Action party and her alternate is Erazo Andi Jimmy Carlos. In May 2025 she was elected by the assembly to be a member of the Oversight and Political Control Commission of the National Assembly. She became the vice President in November, whilst the president of that commission is Ferdinan Álvarez . The commission oversees political trials. The other members of the commission include Nataly Morillo, Ana Herrera, Janeth Bustos, Fricson George, María Paula Villacreses Herrera and Fabiola Sanmartín.

She raised complaints against Bladimir Farinango and Juan Andrés González of the Citizen Revolution party in January 2026. The latter accusation was referred to the Ethics Committee of the National Assembly.
