= Andrea Rivadeneira =

Ecuadorian politician

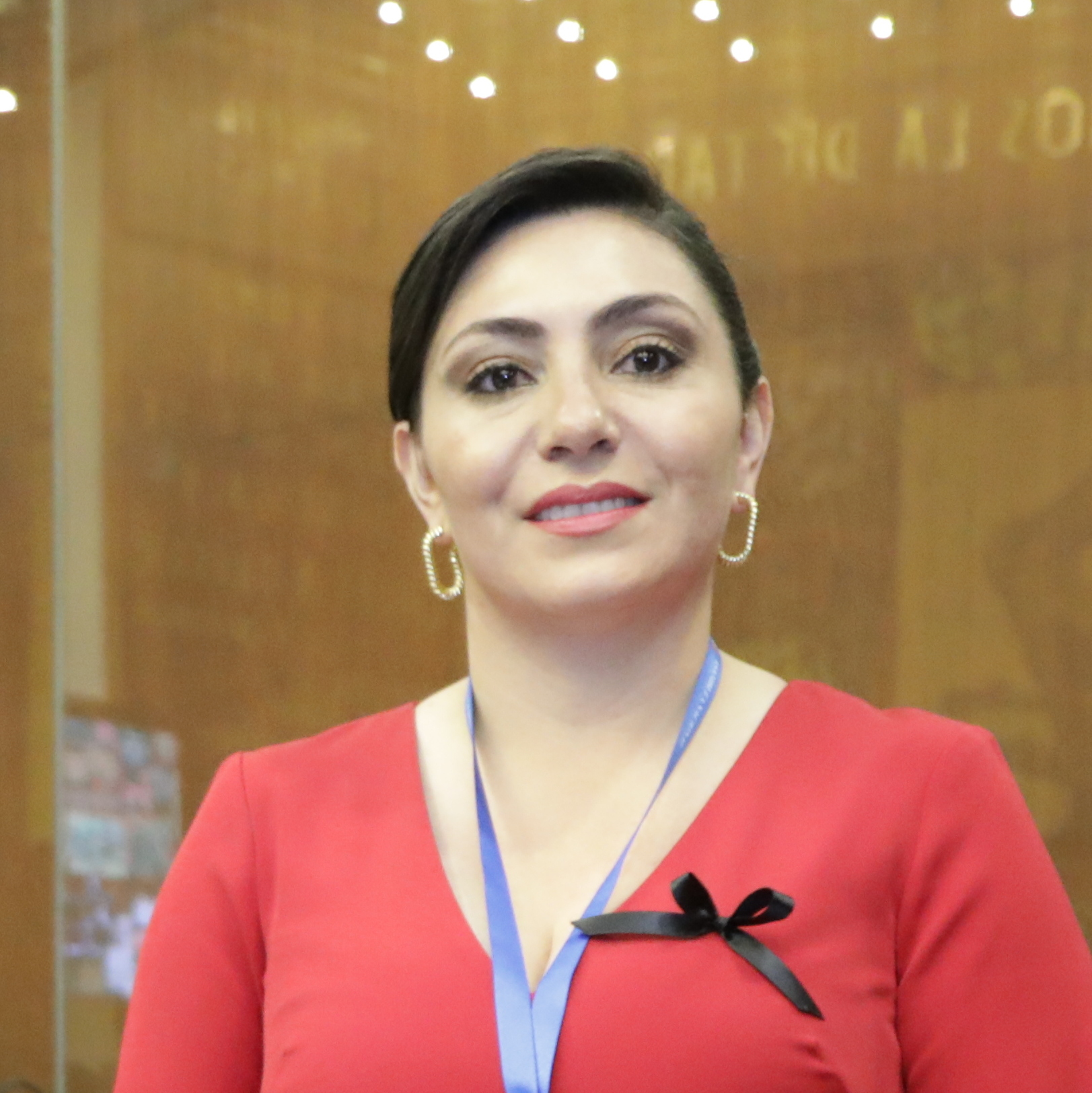
- Born: c.1988 Zamora Canton
- Occupation: politician
- Known for: member of the National Assembly
- Political party: was Construye movement bench (until June 2024)

Andrea Yalu Rivadeneira Calderón (born c.1988) is an Ecuadorian politician who became a member of Ecuador's National Assembly in 2023.

== Life ==
Rivadeneira was born in Zamora Canton in 1988. She was one of three girls born to María Elena Calderón Ojeda and Juan Felipe Rivadeneira Jaramillo. She qualified as a lawyer after passing her degree at the National University of Loja. She later went to Spain to obtain a master's degree in Human Rights from the International University of La Rioja.

New national elections were unexpectedly required in 2023, because of the cross-death decree issued by President Guillermo Lasso. Zamora Chinchipe's national assembly members, Isabel Enriquez and Diego Esparza Aguirre, were replaced by Rivadeneira and Héctor Valladarles. Henry Kronfle became the president of the re-formed National Assembly of 137 representatives in 2023. At his election there were only nine members who voted against him being president and these included Cecilia Baltazar, Fabiola Sanmartín, Lucia Posso, Carmen Tiupul, Adriana Garcia, Luzmila Abad, Mariana Yumbay and Rivadeneira. She serves on the National Assembly's Commission for Food Sovereignty and Development of the Agricultural and Fisheries Sector.

She represents the Zamora Chinchipe Build Movement. She uses her position to question the government. She raised the slow progress being made in creating a university for the Amazon and a new hospital for Zamora. The link known as the 4th Road Axis was a collaboration with Peru. She reminded the assembly that Peru has completed their part but the section in Ecuador is stalled.

In November 2023, she was elected to the Assembly's commission on Food Sovereignty and Development of the Agricultural and Fisheries Sector. It was led by Jaminton Intriago and Marjorie Rosado as President and vice-president. The other members were Mónica Palacios, Amy Gende, Patricia Núñez, Eduardo Mendoza, Viviana Zambrano and Roberto Cuero.

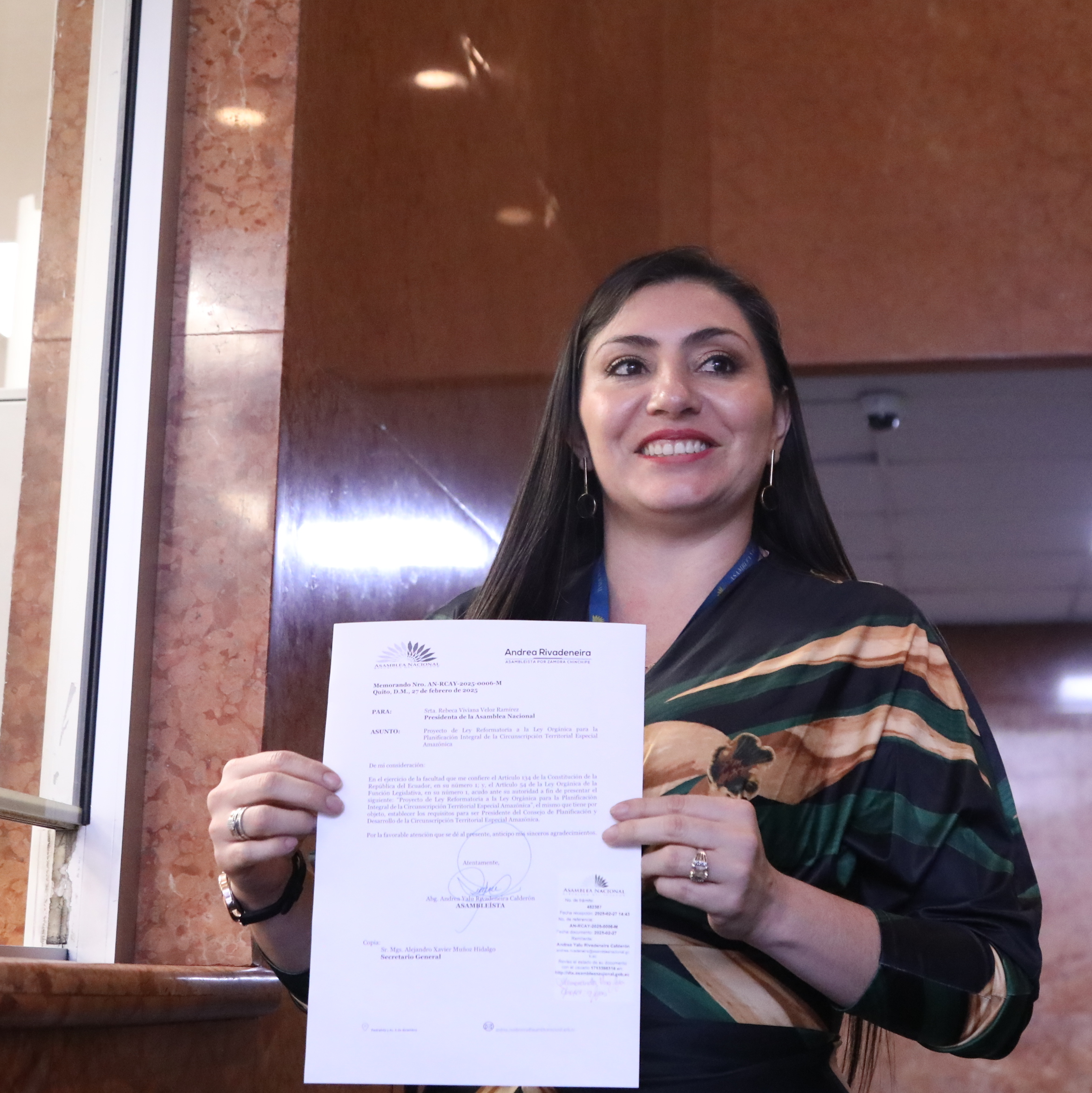
A proposed Law in 2025 "for the Comprehensive Planning of the Amazon Special Territorial District"

At the end in 2023, she spoke out against the trial of the prosecutor Diana Salazar. Salazar was after the criminals who organised the trade in narcotics. Fernando Villavicencio had been assassinated after speaking out against these people. Rivadeneira said that these crimes should not be treated with impunity.

In June 2024, Construye recognised that she and assemblyperson Carla Cruz had effectively left the party when they attended the national convention of the PSC.
