= Lucía Posso =

Ecuador politician

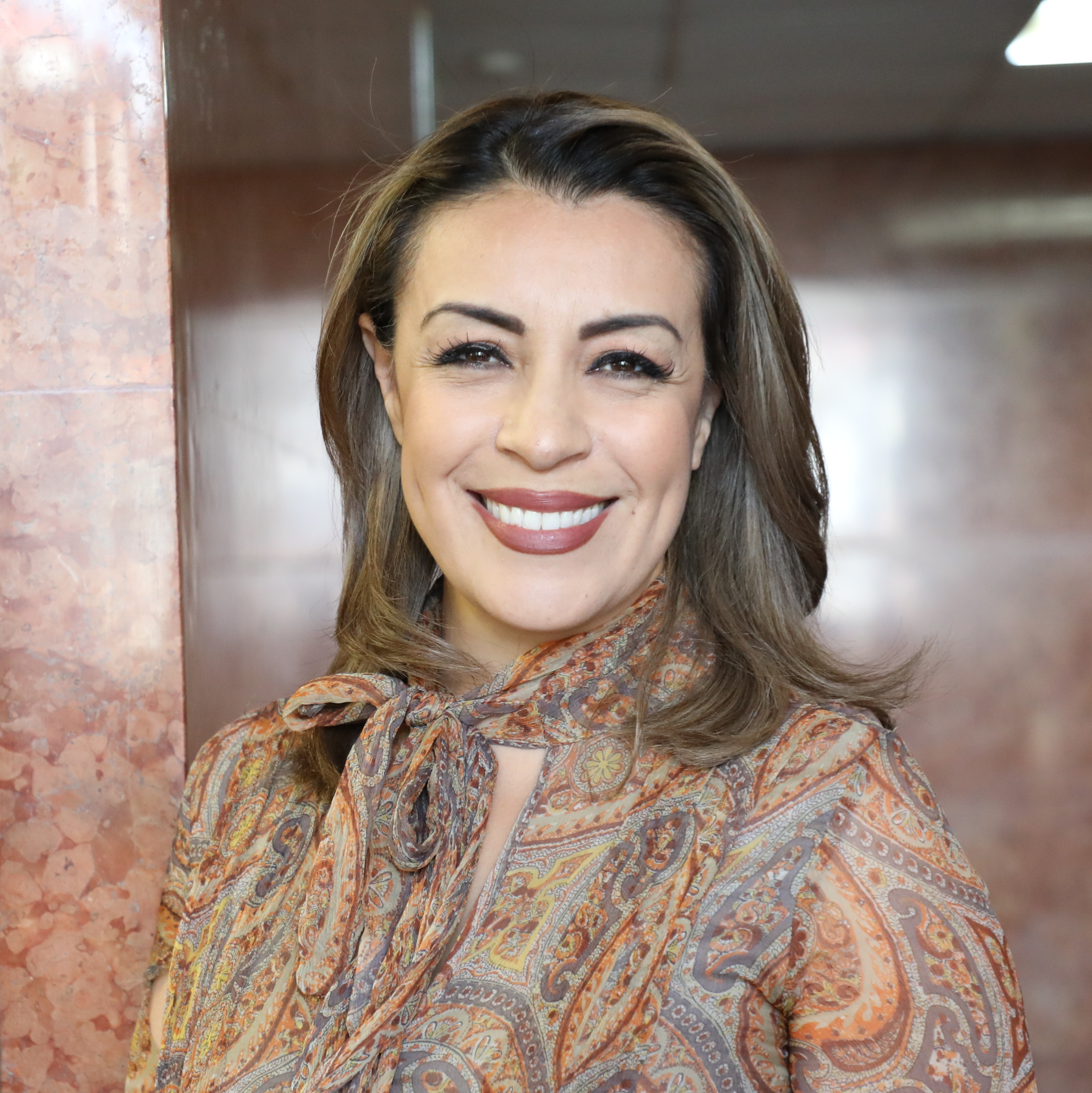
- August 2024
- Born: 8 August 1980 (age 45)
- Occupation: politician
- Known for: member of Ecuador's National Assembly for the province of Imbabura
- Political party: Avanza/ Independent

Lucía Posso Naranjo (born 8 August 1980) is an Ecuadorian politician who is a member of Ecuador's National Assembly for the province of Imbabura. She has been an Independent politician.

== Life ==
Her education was at the Pensionado Atahualpa School and the Colegio Fiscal de Señoritas Ibarra. She has a Master's degree in Social Management and Development and a doctorate in Jurisprudence.

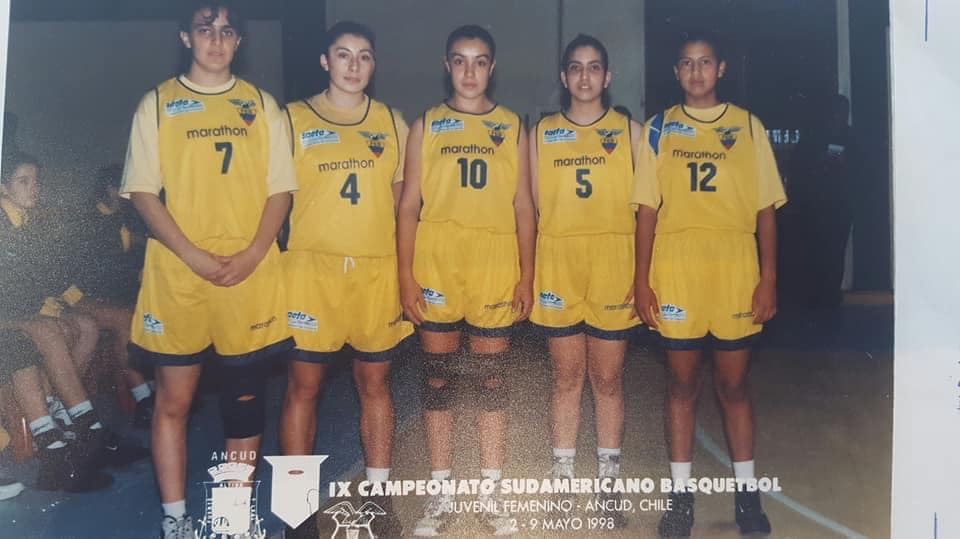
Basketball in 1998

Posso played basketball and in 1998 she was in Ecuador's team at the South American Basketball Championship which was held in Chile.

She was a councillor in Ibarra before the national assembly resigned in 2023, as required by the cross-death decree issued by President Guillermo Lasso. Previous members were able to participate in the general elections for the new Assembly as well as Posso. She was elected to the assembly and to its commission on "Transparency, Citizen Participation and Social Control" together with others including Mariana Yumbay and Carmen Tiupul. Henry Kronfle became the president of the re-formed National Assembly in 2023. At his election there were only nine members who voted against him being President and these included Cecilia Baltazar, Adriana García, Carmen Tiupul, Fabiola Sanmartín, Andrea Rivadeneira, Luzmila Abad, Mariana Yumbay and Posso.

Posso spoke out when the President proposed that the National Assembly might be responsible for the countries state of affairs in 2024. The Minister of the Interior, Mónica Palencia, was facing impeachment over her role in the arrest of a disgraced politician inside the Mexican Embassy. Posso noted that the law was being used to control politicians but ministers must face that this was necessary as the executive must "be accountable to the Plenary". She lauded the State Attorney General, Diana Salazar, who has not rejected the impeachment moves against her. On 3 September the assembly carried a resolution that delayed the impeachment of Palencia.
