= Cecilia Baltazar =

Ecuadorian politician

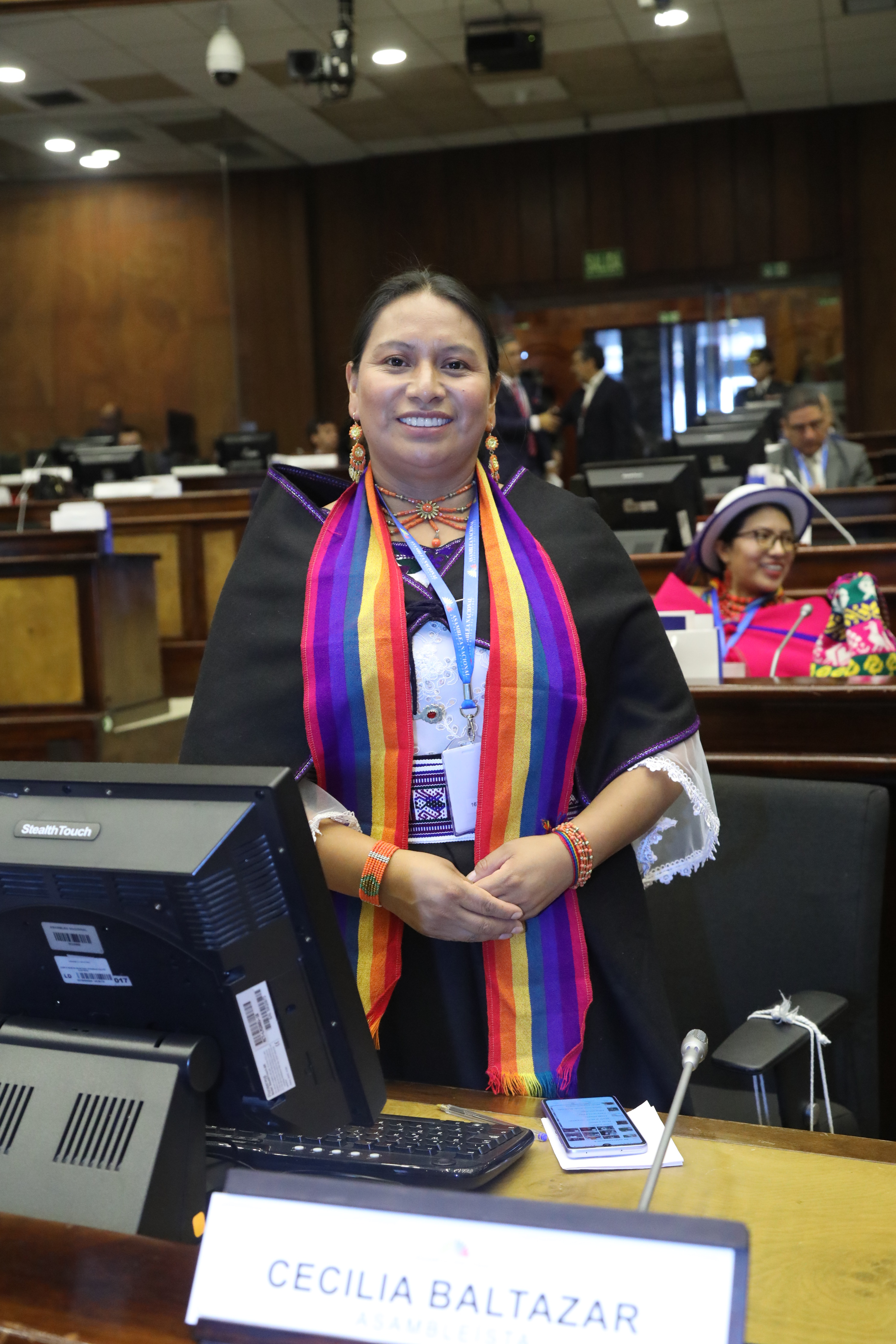
- Baltazar in 2023
- Occupation: politician
- Known for: member of the National Assembly
- Political party: Pachakutik

Rosa Cecilia Baltazar Yucailla is an Ecuadorian politician who became a member of the National Assembly in 2023.

== Life ==
Baltazar has a master's degree in Constitutional Law from the Universidad San Francisco de Quito.

She is a translator of the Kichwa language.

She is an adviser to the Constitutional Court of Ecuador. In 2020 she joined the board of the pressure group "Land is Life". She wanted to help the group as it tries to empower indigenous leaders to resist the pressures to exploit their land.

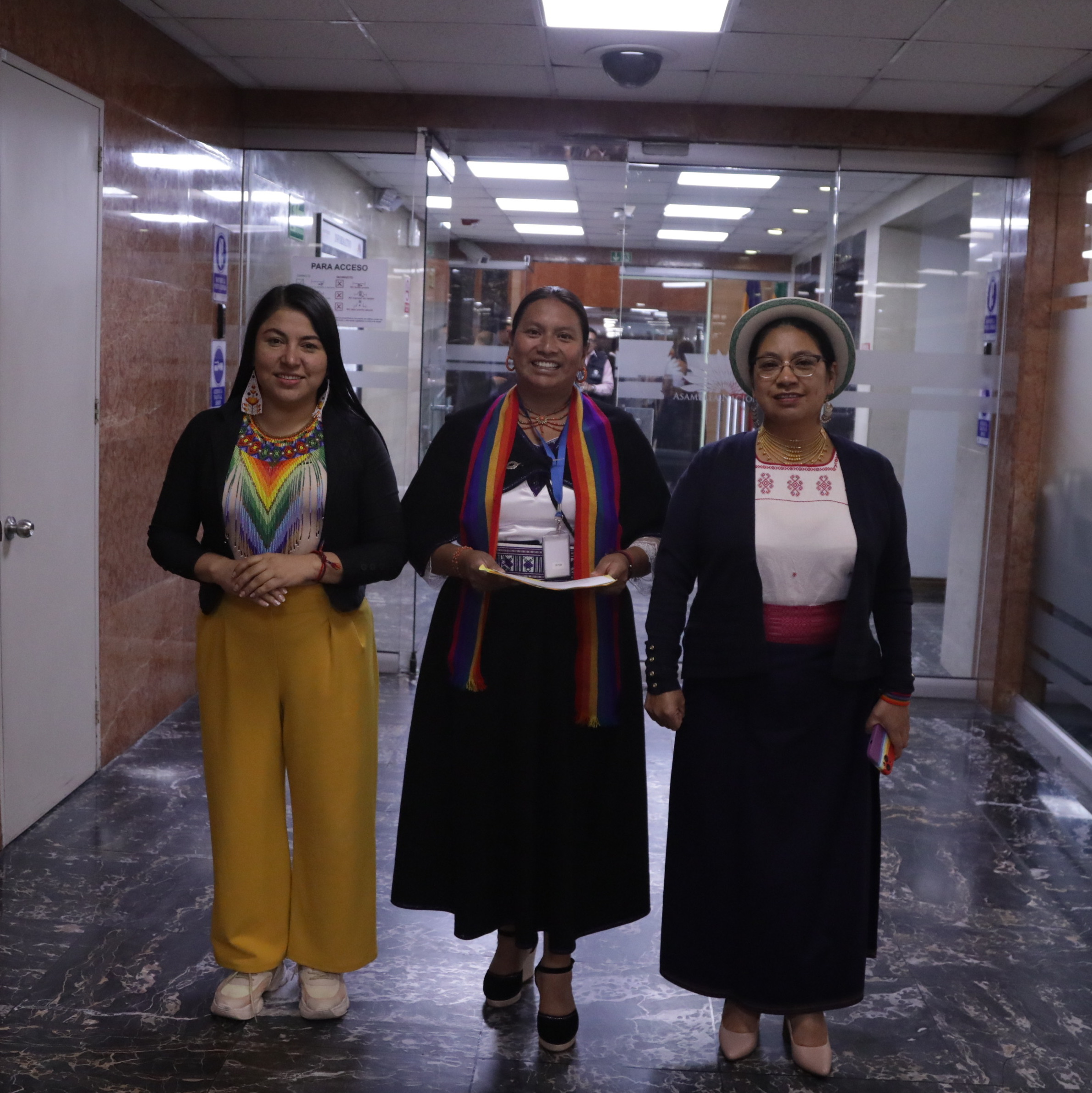
Luzmila Abad, Baltazar and Mariana Yumbay at the National Assembly, 6 Nov 2024

She was elected to the National Assembly following the snap 2023 Ecuadorian general election. She is one of the four assembly members who represents the province of Tungurahua. She benefited from a local context in favour of her party Pachakutik despite being relatively unknown. She is a member of the Permanent Commission of Education, Culture, Science, Technology, Innovation and Ancestral Knowledge. The other members were Mauricio Zambrano, Jahiren Noriega, Zolanda Pluas, Nathaly Morillo, Dallyana Passailaigue, Ana María Raffo, Hernán Zapata and Juan Carlos Camacho.

Henry Kronfle became the President of the re-formed National Assembly of 137 representatives in 2023. At his election there were only nine members who voted against him including Mariana Yumbay, Adriana García, Lucia Posso, Fabiola Sanmartín, Andrea Rivadeneira, Carmen Tiupul, Luzmila Abad and Baltazar.

She was re-elected in 2025 to represent the small Tungurahua Province and she was made the President of the National Assembly's Commission on Education, Culture, Science and Technology, Innovation and Ancestral Knowledge. Other Commission members included Monica Salazar Hidalgo, Ana María Raffo and Ana Belén Yela Duarte.
