= Adriana García =

Ecuadorian politician

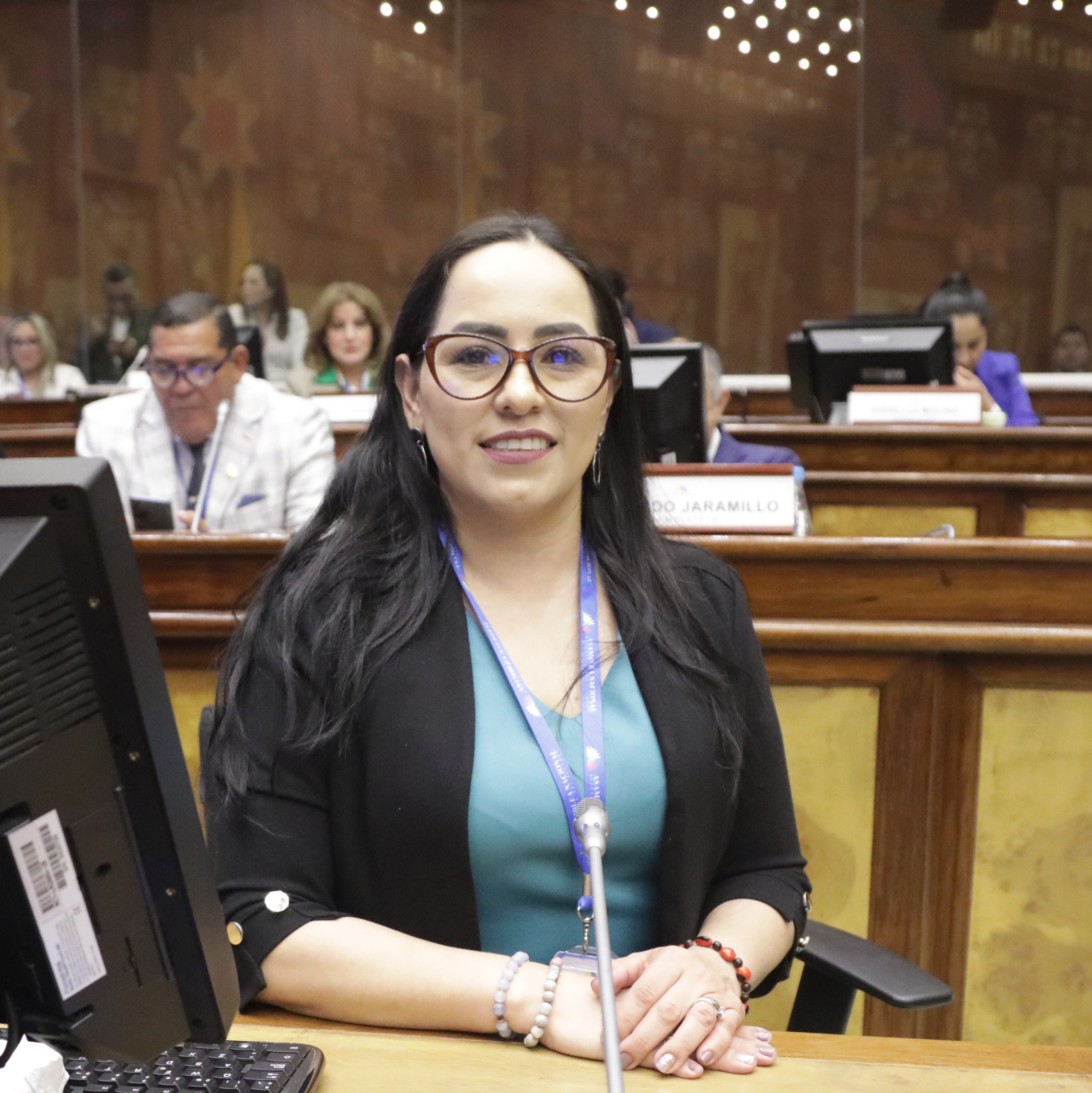
- April 2024
- Born: c.1982 Manta, Ecuador
- Occupation: politician
- Known for: member of Ecuador's National Assembly
- Political party: Movimiento Gente Buena

Adriana Denisse García Mejía (born c.1982) is an Ecuadorian politician. She was elected to Ecuador's National Assembly in 2023 and became a member of the Gente Buena movement.

== Life ==
García was born in Manta in about 1982. She studied accounting and became an auditor.

In 2020 she was the director of the port of Manta. In the following year she unsuccessfully stood for election to the National Assembly. She stood in the province of Manabí as part of the now defunct Alianza Honestidad.

New national elections were unexpectedly required in 2023, because of the cross-death decree issued by President Guillermo Lasso. Garcia was elected as part of a short-lived alliance between the Construye Movement and the Gente Buena movement. She became a member of the National Assembly's Permanent Commission for Oversight and Political Control. Henry Kronfle became the president of the re-formed National Assembly of 137 representatives in 2023. At his election there were only nine members who voted against him being president and these included Cecilia Baltazar, Fabiola Sanmartín, Lucia Posso, Carmen Tiupul, Andrea Rivadeneira, Luzmila Abad, Mariana Yumbay and Garcia.

In June 2024 she visited Manabi where she reported that the hospitals were short of staff and funding. She noted that an investigation was on-going into alleged corruption at the port of Manta where she had once been the director. The alleged corruption was by ex-President Correa and ex-minister Walter Solís who were accused of embezzlement.
