= Fricson George =

Ecuadorian footballer and politician (born 1974)

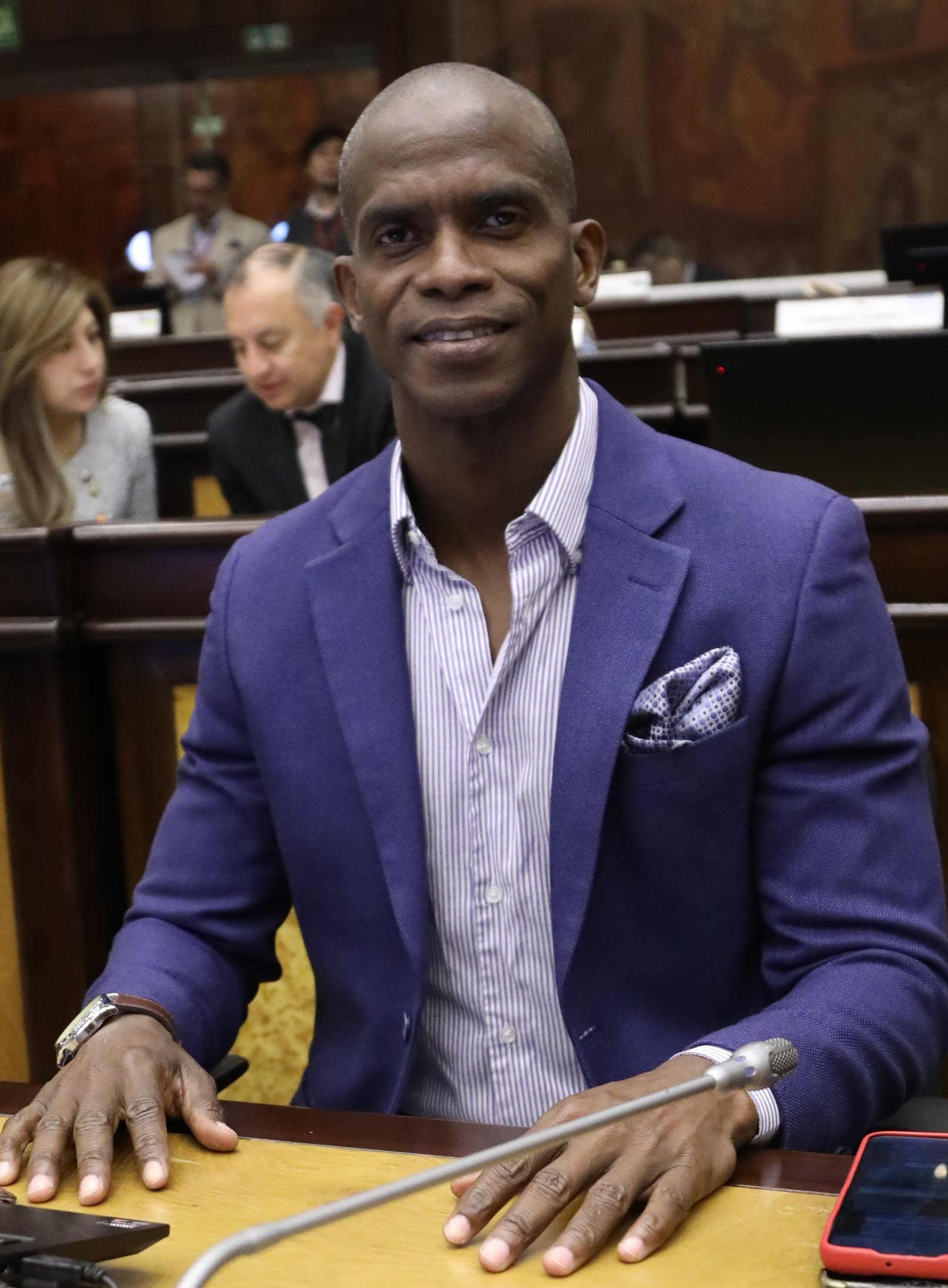
- George in 2025

Personal information
- Full name: Fricson Vinicio George Tenorio
- Date of birth: September 16, 1974 (age 52)
- Place of birth: Esmeraldas, Ecuador
- Height: 1.72 m (5 ft 8 in)
- Position: Defender

Team information
- Current team: El Nacional

Senior career*
| Years | Team | Apps | (Gls) |
| 1993 | Filanbanco | 0 | (0) |
| 1994 | Delfín | 5 | (0) |
| 1994–1999 | Barcelona SC | 26 | (2) |
| 1999 | Santos | 1 | (0) |
| 2000–2008 | Barcelona SC | 73 | (5) |
| 2009 | El Nacional | 12 | (0) |
| 2010–2011 | River Plate | | |

International career
| 1999–2007 | Ecuador | 18 | (0) |
- * Club domestic league appearances and goals as of November 16, 2008

Fricson Vinicio George Tenorio (born 16 September 1974) is a retired Ecuadorian football defender and politician who was elected to the National Assembly in the 2025 Ecuadorian general election.

== Politics ==
George was elected to represent district 4 of Guayas Province in the National Assembly. In May 2025 he was elected by the assembly to be a member of the Oversight and Political Control Commission of the National Assembly. The president of that commission is Ferdinan Álvarez and the vice President is Belén Tapia. The commission oversees political trials. The other members of the commission include Nataly Morillo, Ana Herrera, Janeth Bustos, María Paula Villacreses Herrera and Fabiola Sanmartín.

== Club career ==
George played for a number of Ecuadorian teams including Filanbanco, Delfin and Barcelona SC. He also played for Brazilian giants Santos.

== International career ==
He made his debut for the national team in 1999.

== Honours ==
=== Club ===
- Barcelona Sporting Club
  - Serie A de Ecuador: 1997
