= Diana Salazar =

Diana Salazar may refer to:

- Diana Salazar (artist) (born 1972), Mexican artist
- Diana Salazar (jurist) (born 1981), Ecuadorian jurist and lawyer
- El extraño retorno de Diana Salazar, Mexican telenovela
