= Carmen Tiupul =

Ecuadorian politician

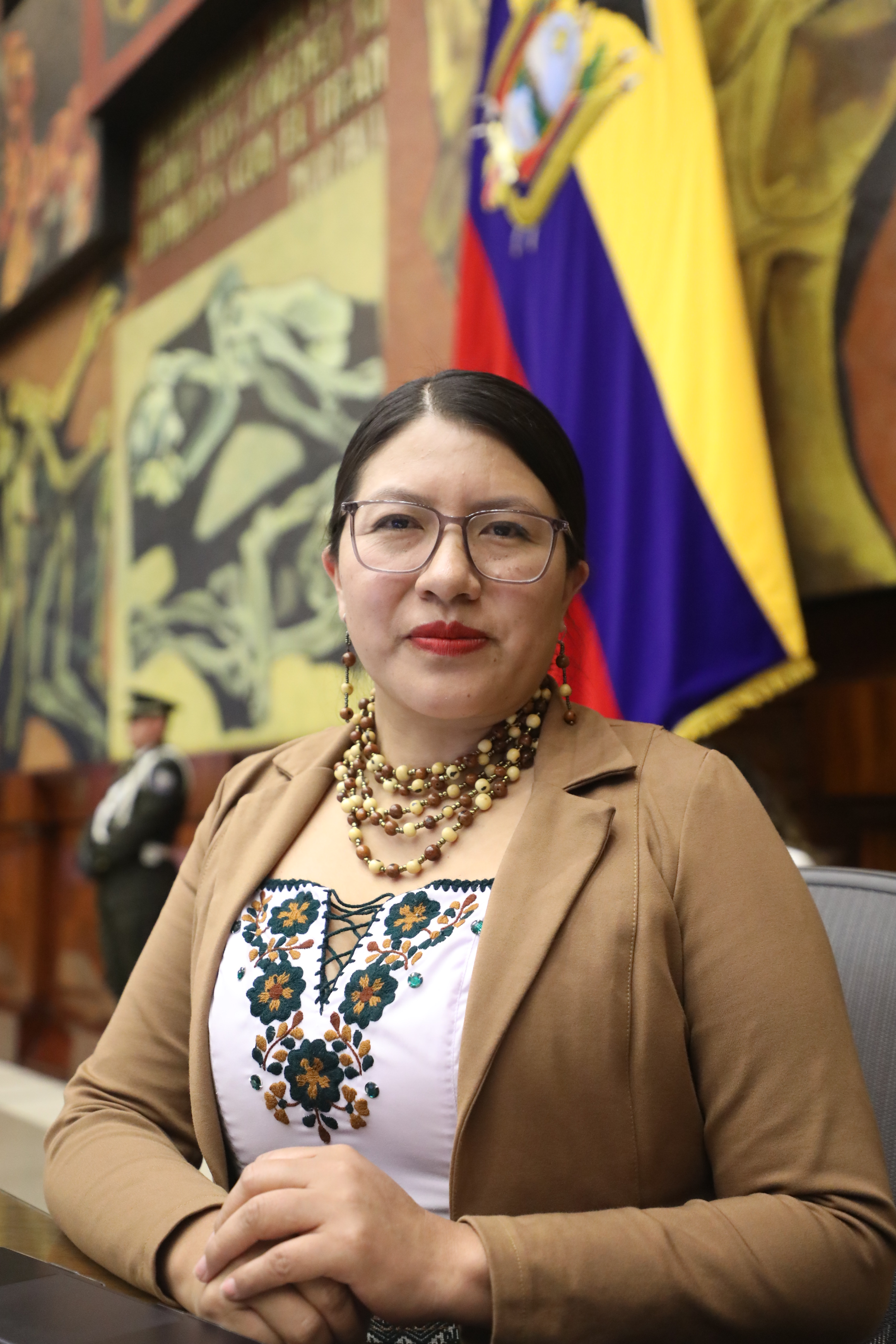
- Tiupul in 2025

Second Vice President of the National Assembly
- Incumbent
- Assumed office 14 May 2025
- Preceded by: Eckenner Recalde

Personal details
- Born: Carmen Tiupul Urquizo; 20 October 1985 (age 40) Cacha, Ecuador
- Party: Independent (since 2025)
- Other political affiliations: Pachakutik (until 2025)

Carmen Tiupul Urquizo is an Ecuadorian politician who serves on the National Assembly representing Chimborazo. She was a member of the Pachakutik Plurinational Unity Movement – New Country party. In 2025 was elected to be the second vice-president of the National Assembly.

== Life ==
Tiupul comes from Cacha people. She has a Business Administration degree and a leadership diploma which she obtained in Chile. Tiupul is a supporter and member of ECUARUNARI which is a confederation of people of Kichwa nationality.

In October 2021 she was tried by a court accused of leading the 2019 Ecuadorian protests. She was found guilty and sentenced to two years in prison and a fine equal to seven times her annual income, In time she was granted amnesty for these offences.

She resigned from the assembly on June 7, 2023, as required by the cross-death decree issued by President Guillermo Lasso so that she could participate in the general elections for the new Assembly. There had been 27 members from her party but this reduced to five and she was one of them. Henry Kronfle became the president of the re-formed National Assembly of 137 representatives in 2023. At his election there were only nine members who voted against him being President and these included Cecilia Baltazar, Adriana García, Lucia Posso, Fabiola Sanmartín, Andrea Rivadeneira, Luzmila Abad, Mariana Yumbay and Tiupul. The assembly also formed its commissions including the one on "Transparency, Citizen Participation and Social Control". Tiupul was one of those elected together with others including Mariana Yumbay and Lucía Posso.

She proposed a bill in February 2024 that would modify the laws that enable the Ecuadorian provinces of Cañar, Morona Santiago, Azuay and Tungurahua to benefit from sale of hydroelectricity created in those states. Tiupul's bill argued that the province of Chimborazo should also take a share because of the rivers that pass through the province of Chimborazo.

In August 2024 it was announced that she would be the Pachacutik party's candidate for re-election to National Assembly in 2025.

In May Mishel Mancheno became the first vice-president of the assembly with Niels Olsen who was also from the National Democratic Action party as the President. The second vice-president was Tiupul from Pachakutik. She was elected to the National Assembly's Commission on the Right to Work and Social Security. Other members included Naila Quintana and Elizabeth Vega.
