= Fabiola Sanmartín =

Ecuador politician

Fabiola Sanmartin
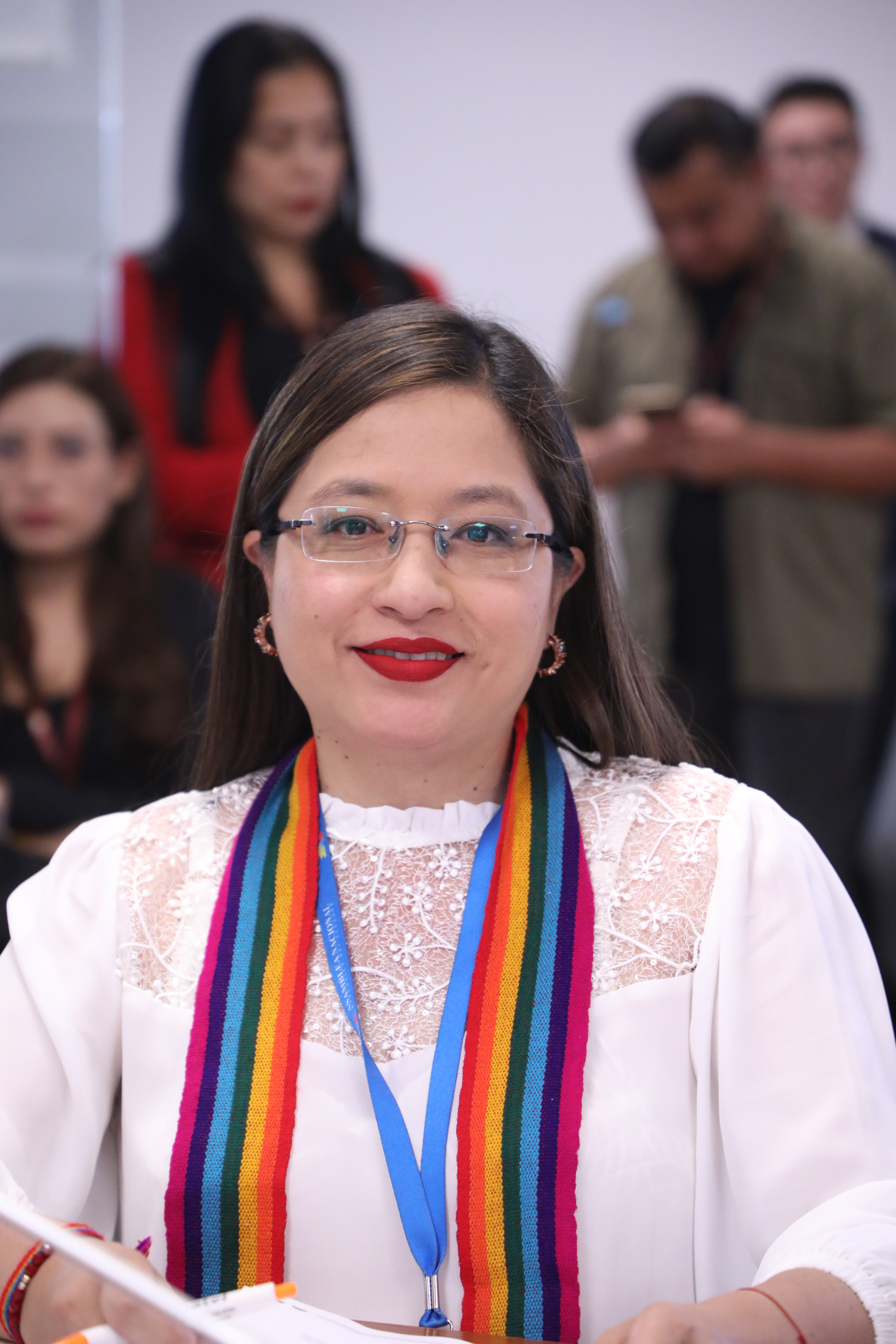
- 2024
- Born: c.1974 Azogues
- Occupation: politician
- Known for: member of the National Assembly
- Political party: Pachakutik Plurinational Unity Movement – New Country -> National Democratic Action

Fabiola Maribel Sanmartín Parra (born 1974) is an Ecuadorian politician who is a member of the National Assembly. She represents the province of Cañar and she was a member of the Pachakutik party before she joined National Democratic Action.

== Life ==
Sanmartin was born in about 1974 in Azogueña. She graduated from the University of Cuenca after studying communication and information science. Her later qualifications are from the Catholic University of Cuenca and her masters is from Salesian Polytechnic University.

New national elections were unexpectedly required in 2023, because of the cross-death decree issued by President Guillermo Lasso. Henry Kronfle became the president of the re-formed National Assembly of 137 representatives in 2023. At his election there were only nine members who voted against him being President and these included Cecilia Baltazar, Adriana García, Lucia Posso, Carmen Tiupul, Andrea Rivadeneira, Luzmila Abad, Mariana Yumbay and Sanmartin. She was one of five women who won Pachakutik seats in the assembly in November 2023, although one of these was in an alliance. She represented Cañar and the others represented Bolívar, Chimborazo, Morona Santiago and Tungurahua. Bolivar had Mariana Yumbay, Chimborazo had Carmen Tiupul, Morona Santiago had Luzmila Abad and Tungurahua had Cecilia Baltazar.

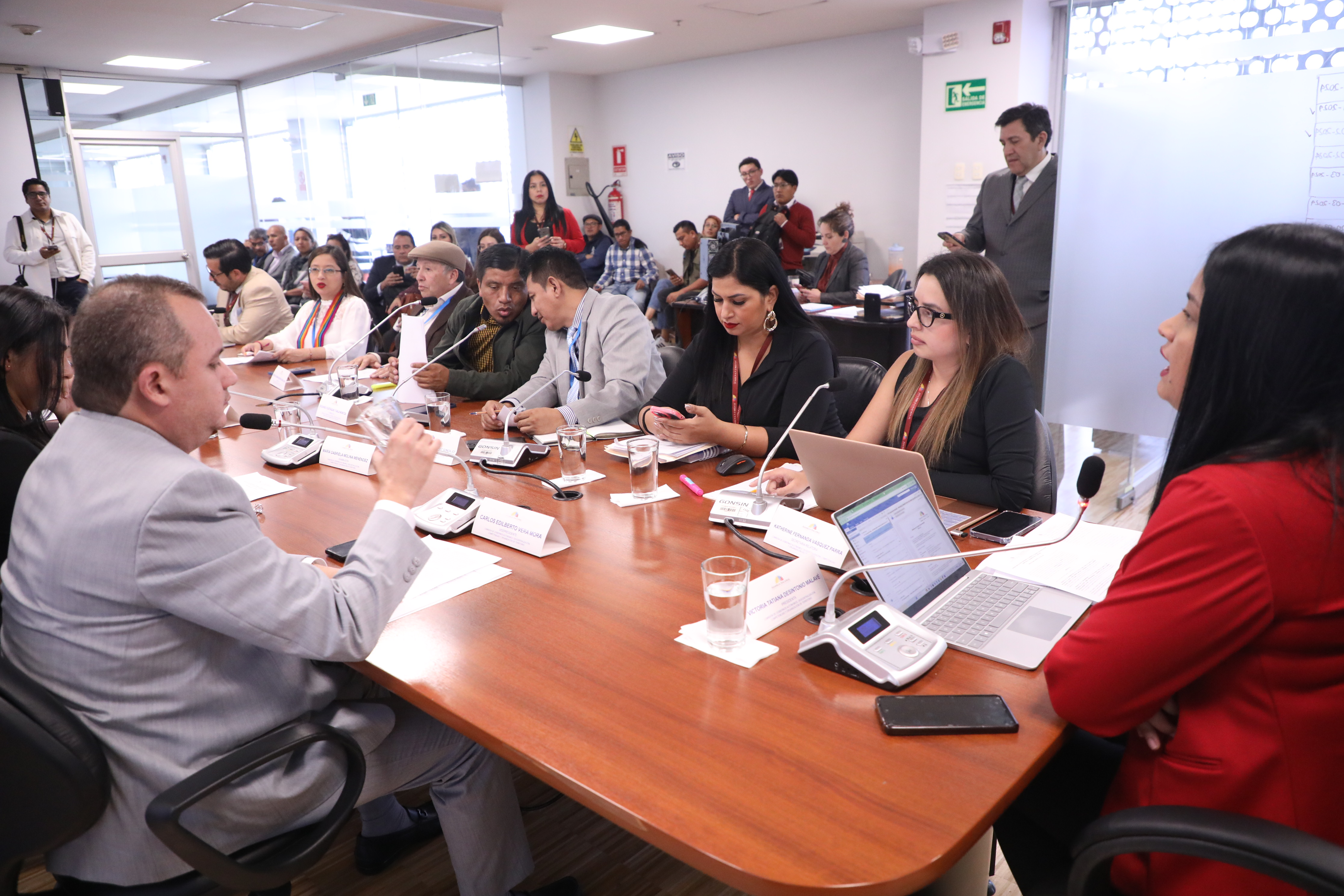
At the Commission of Autonomous Governments, Decentralization, Competencies and Territorial Organization in April 2024

After she joined the assembly in 2024, she was elected to serve on the Commission of Autonomous Governments, Decentralization, Competencies and Territorial Organization. Victoria Desintonio was the President and the commission's members also included Gabriela Molina and Gissella Molina.

On International Women's Day, 2024, she gave out awards in the name of Matilde Hidalgo to Vicenta Chuma, Luz Palomeque and Francisca Sumba. In the following week she presented the Organic Health Law project on Assisted Human Reproduction Techniques. This project delivers laws that gives those who could benefit from help with reproduction the right to use it. It recognises existing techniques and establishes a framework so that new techniques can be added as they are discovered.

In May 2024 she welcomed a vote in the National Assembly which set aside moves to impeach State Attorney General, Diana Salazar.

In 2025 she was the National Democratic Action party's top choice of three candidates for Cañar as she sought re-election. She was re-elected and in May 2025 she was elected to join the Assembly's Oversight and Political Control Commission. The President of that commission was Ferdinan Álvarez. The commission oversee political trials. The other members of the commission included Janeth Katherine Bustos Salazar, Fricson George, Nataly Morillo, María Paula Villacreses Herrera, Ana Belén Tapia and Ana Herrera.
