= Mariana Yumbay =

Ecuadorian poli and judge

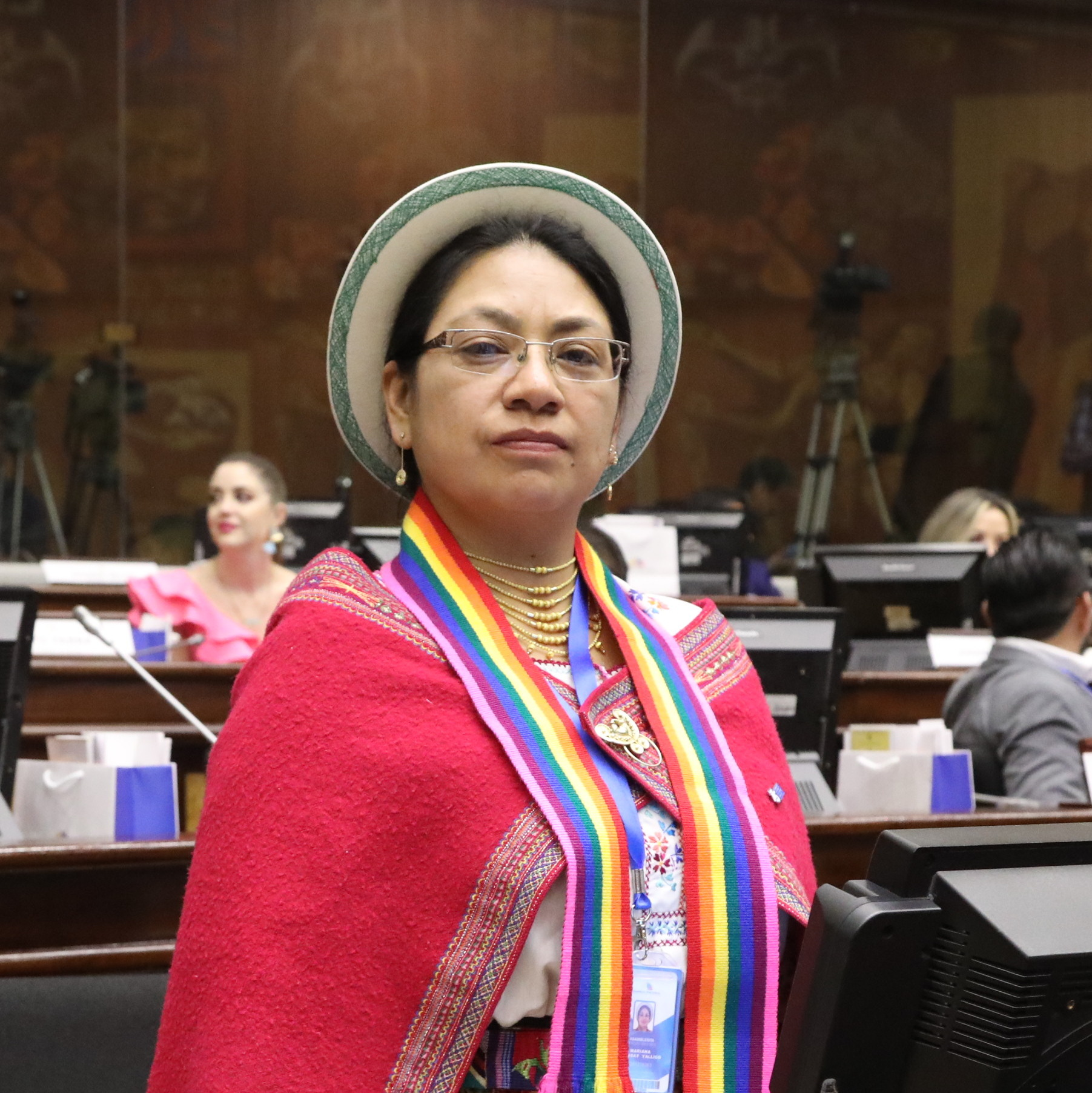
- Pictured in 2023
- Occupations: Judge, negotiator, politician
- Known for: Member of Ecuador's National Assembly

ian

Mariana Yumbay is an Ecuadorian politician, writer and judge. In 2023, she was elected to Ecuador's National Assembly and re-elected in 2025.

== Life ==
Yumbay is a Kichwa woman from Bolívar Province in Ecuador. She came from a very supportive family who did not see her ethnicity or gender as a bar to becoming successful.

The Indigenous Women's Biodiversity Network was formed in 1998 during COP4. In 2007 Yumbay was lecturing at a university and she was the executive director of the Institute for Indigenous Sciences Pacari. Yumbay was at COP13. She was known as a militant in her province of Bolivar. She noted that the indigenous people had very little to show for the actions of politicians.

She took on the difficult task of negotiating water rights between countries. These rights are not dependent on national boundaries alone but on geography and the history and heritage of the indigenous people who live there. One of her concerns when she was involved in the Binational Commission for Integrated Water Resources Management of Transboundary Waters between Peru and Ecuador was to ensure that the voices of indigenous women were heard. Yumbay was a champion of the power given by the constitution given to traditional justice. Internally territories are allowed to uphold indigenous ideas such as ama llulla, ama killa, ama shwa (not to lie, be lazy or steal).

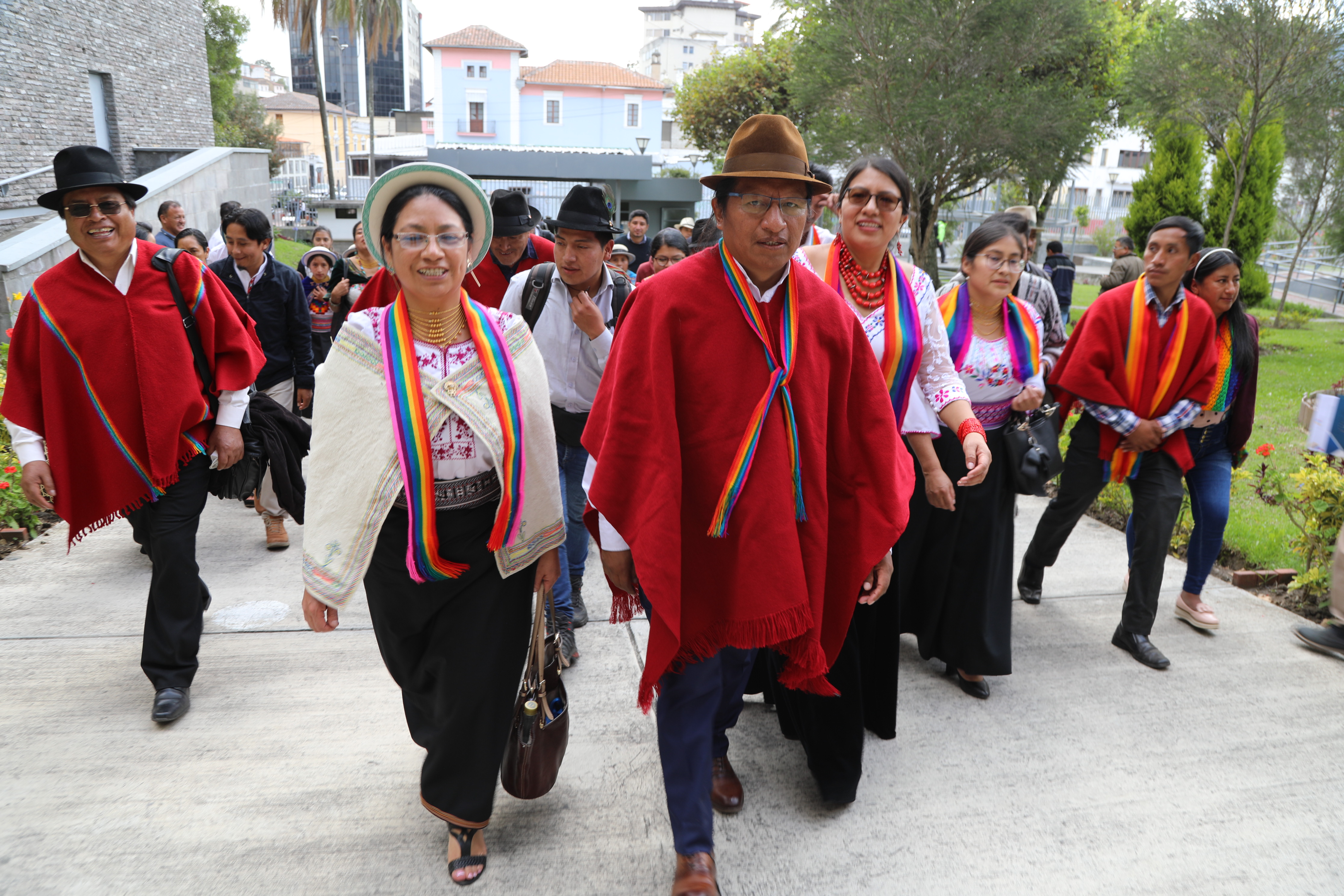
With fellow politicians at the National Assembly in 2023

The President of Ecuador Guillermo Lasso brought in the constitution clause number 148 known as mutual death in May 2023 when he knew that he was about to be impeached. This required all of the existing Ecuador's National Assembly members to stand for re-election. Yumbay was one of the names who returned to contest the new elections. As a former judge of the National Court of Justice this raised some comment.

Henry Kronfle became the President of the re-formed National Assembly of 137 representatives in 2023. At his election there were only nine members who voted against him including Rosa Baltazar, Adriana García, Lucia Posso, Fabiola Sanmartín, Andrea Rivadeneira, Carmen Tiupul, Luzmila Abad and Yumbay. The assembly also formed its commissions including the one on Transparency, Citizen Participation and Social Control. Yumbay was one of those elected together with others including Carmen Tiupul and Lucía Posso.

Yumbay was re-elected to the National Assembly and she was chosen in 2025 to join the National Assembly's Commission on Sovereignty, Integration and Comprehensive Security. It was led by Inés Alarcón and other members included Jhajaira Urresta, Jahiren Noriega, Camila Anahi Cueva Toro and Gema Karolina Dueñas Palma. They will serve until 2027.
