= Janeth Bustos =

Janeth Bustos Salazar
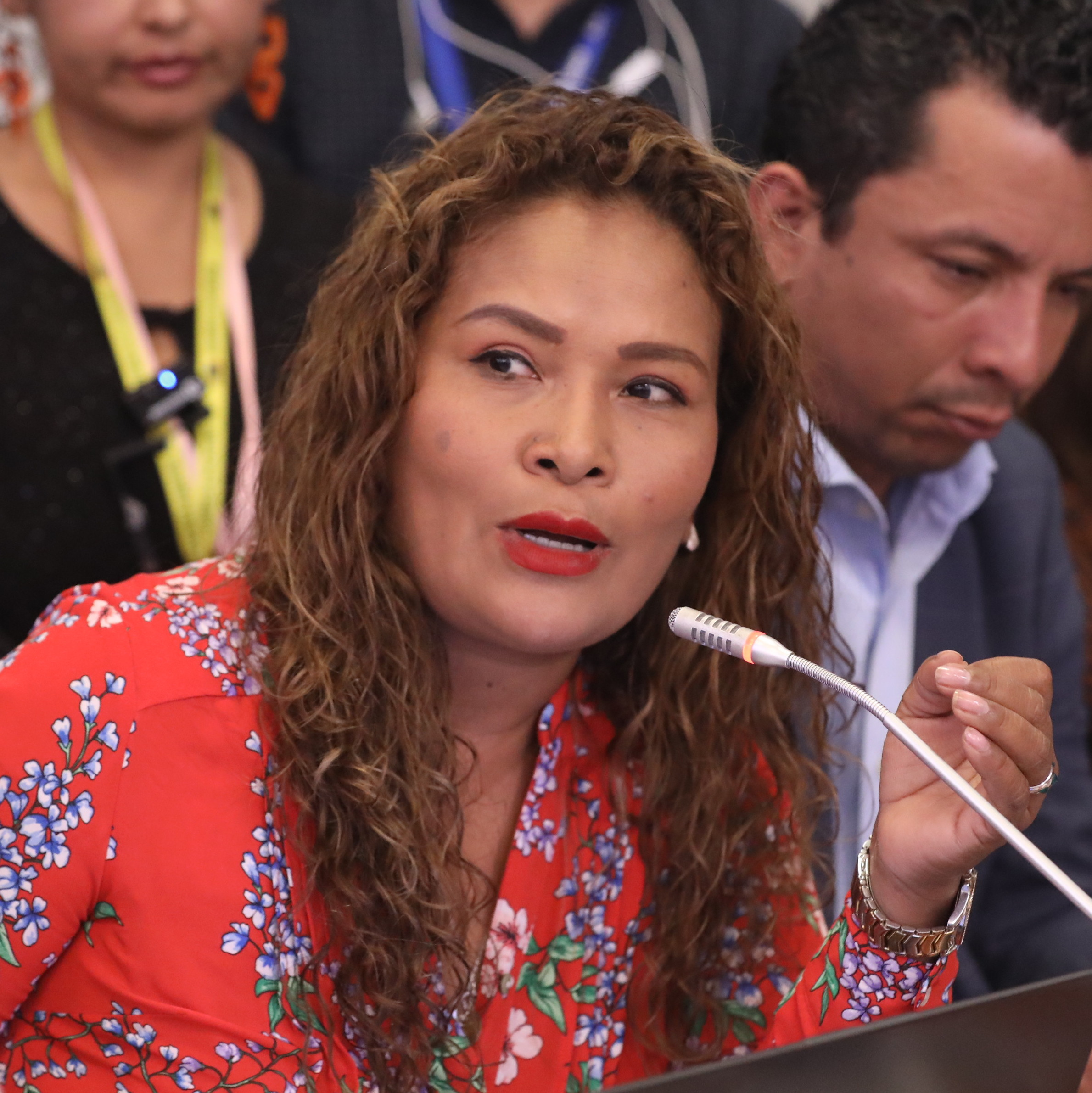
- Occupation: politician
- Political party: Citizen Revolution Movement

Janeth Katherine Bustos Salazar is an Ecuadorian member of parliament. She is a member of the Citizen Revolution Movement.

== Life ==
Bustos became the national assembly member for the province of Esmeraldas in 2025. In May 2025 she was elected by the assembly to be a member of the Oversight and Political Control Commission of the National Assembly. The president of that commission is Ferdinan Álvarez. The commission oversees political trials. The other members of the commission include Nataly Morillo, Ana Herrera, Fricson George, María Paula Villacreses Herrera, Ana Belén Tapia and Fabiola Sanmartín. That committee supported the trial of Narda Solanda Goyes Quelal under the accusation that he had obstructed the appointment of judges by not attending a key committee.

In February 2026 the Mining and Energy Bill which was created by the President to assist in managing the country's energy supply was being discussed. The Citizen Revolution party proposed that the bill should be blocked. That proposal only gathered 62 votes, but Bustos and Christian Hernández Yunda raised eyebrows when they abstained on a bill that they might be expected to support.
