= Members of the National Assembly of Ecuador (2023–2025) =

List of Assembly members

This article lists the members of the National Assembly of Ecuador as elected in the 2023 Ecuadorian general election.

== National list ==
Name	Party	Start	End
Thin Pierina Strap Sara Mercedes	RC	November 17, 2023	
Tuala Muntza Eustaquio	RC	November 17, 2023	
Cabezas Castillo Janeth Paola	RC	November 17, 2023	
Agualsaca Guamán José Clemente	RC	November 17, 2023	
Arotingo Cushcagua Rose Margarita	RC	November 17, 2023	
Ulcuango Farinango Ricardo	RC	November 17, 2023	
Carrillo Rosero Hernán Patricio	MC25	Did not take office	
Morillo Solórzano Lourdes Nataly	MC25	November 17, 2023	
García Mejía Adriana Denisse	Ind.	November 17, 2023	
Moreno Felix Jaime	MC25	November 17, 2023	
Centeno Arteaga Valentina	Ind.	November 17, 2023	
Moreno Encalada Arturo Germán	P.I.D.	November 17, 2023	
Kronfle Kozhaya Henry Fabian	PSC	November 17, 2023	
Jaramillo Zurita Lucía Lizbeth	Ind.	November 17, 2023	
Subía Dávalos Karina del Carmen	ADDITION	November 17, 2023	
Gutiérrez Borbúa Lucio Edwin	PSP	November 17, 2023	
