= Universidad de los Andes =

Universidad de los Andes ('University of the Andes') may refer to:

== Universities ==
- Los Andes Peruvian University, Peru
- University of the Andes, Chile
- University of the Andes (Colombia)
- University of the Andes (Venezuela)

== Other uses ==
- Universidad de Los Andes F.C., a Venezuelan football club
