= Nataly Morillo =

Politician in Ecuador

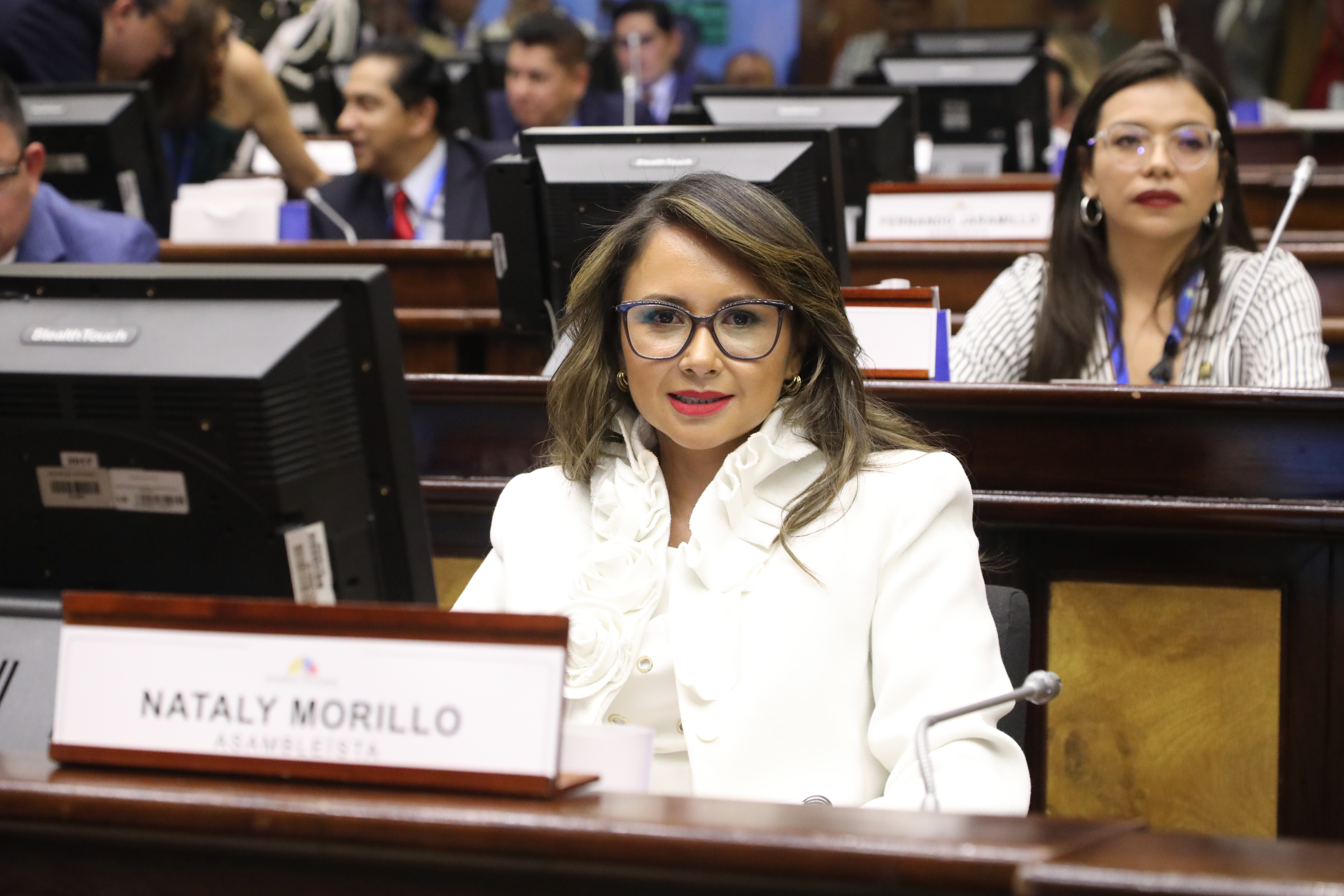
- in 2023
- Other name: Lourdes Nataly Morillo Solorzano
- Occupation: politician
- Known for: Member of the National Assembly
- Political party: joined National Democratic Action (ADN)

Lourdes Nataly Morillo Solorzano is an Ecuadorian Politician who became a Member of the National Assembly of Ecuador from 2023. She was re-elected in 2025, before she was chosen as a government Minister for the Interior in November 2025.

== Life ==
Morillo graduated with a degree in social communication from the Salesian Polytechnic University. She has a masters degree in Political Communication and Marketing.

Morillo became a Member of the National Assembly of Ecuador in 2023. She represented the Province of Pichincha and her substitute was Garcia Velasquez Luigi Edu.

Morillo joined the ruling National Democratic Action (ADN) in August 2024.

She was re-elected in the 2025 elections to represent Pichincha. She had requested that over 200 ballot boxes should be recounted as she said there were "inconsistencies". As it was only three ballot boxes were recounted and this revealed another 100 votes for her.

In May 2025 she was elected to be the vice President of the Oversight and Political Control Commission of the National Assembly. The President of that commission, Ferdinan Álvarez, is also an ADN member. The commission oversee political trials. The other members of the commission include Janeth Katherine Bustos Salazar, Ana Herrera, María Paula Villacreses Herrera, Ana Belén Tapia and Fabiola Sanmartín.

In September 2025 she was interviewed by Forever Radio. She spoke about the demonstration in Guayavil which had involved about 70,000 people including the President Daniel Noboa and leader of her party. The march was intended to be a march for peace and against organised crime. She was appointed as the Minister of the Interior in November 2025 and she resigned from her National Assembly positions. Belén Tapia replaced her as vice-President of the assembly's oversight commission.
