= Diana Salazar (artist) =

Mexican artist (born 1972)

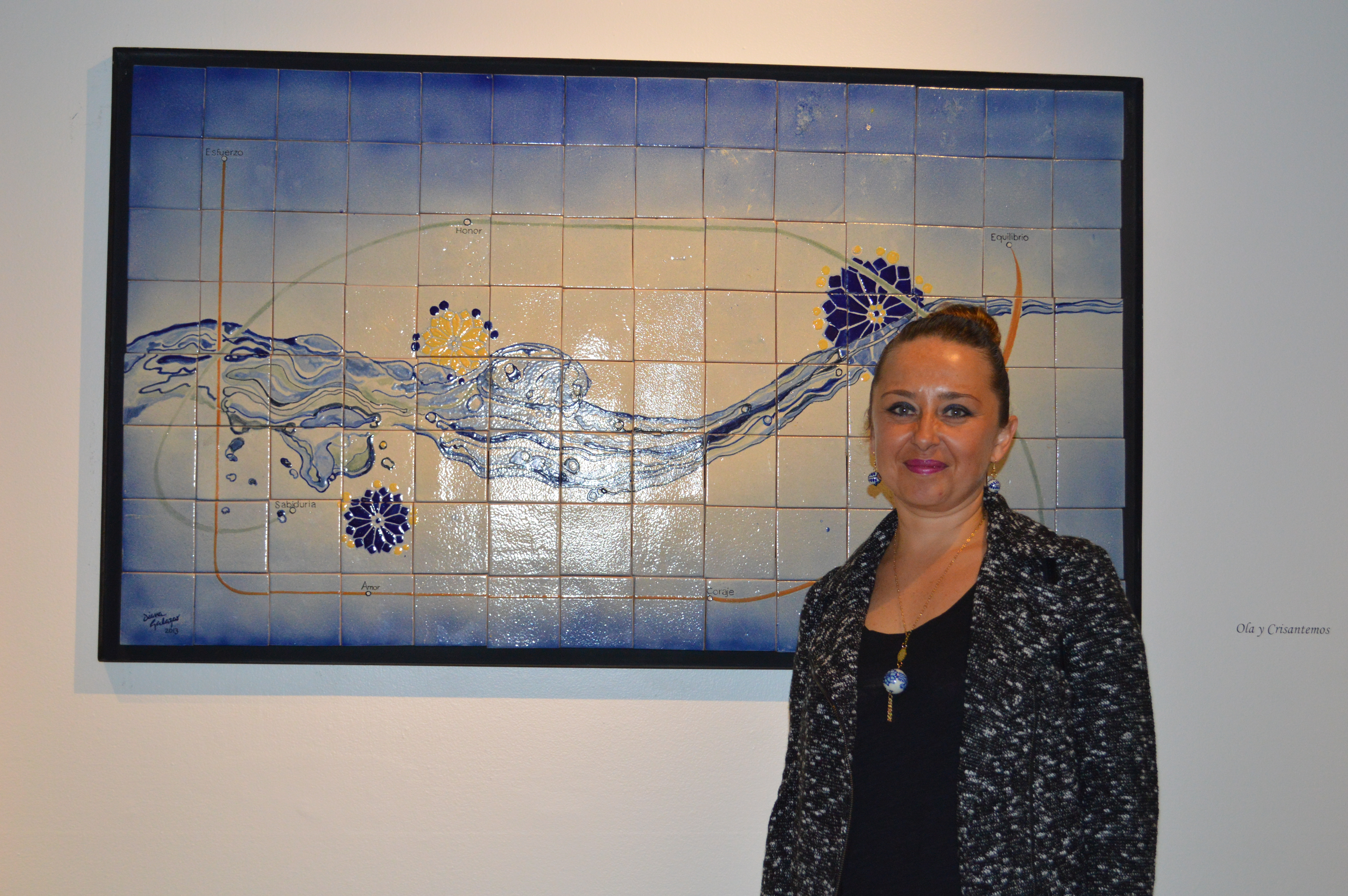
- Artist with ceramic piece at the Museo de Arte Popular in Mexico City
- Born: Diana Eliza Salazar Mendez; 1972 (age 52–53); Mexico City
- Education: National School of Plastic Arts
- Alma mater: National Autonomous University of Mexico
- Known for: painting

Diana Eliza Salazar Mendez (born 1972) is a Mexican artist, whose career has been split between production and teaching since 1995. She has worked primarily in painting, but also in photography, printing and ceramics. Her work has been recognized with membership into Mexico's Sistema Nacional de Creadores de Arte as well as grants and awards.

== Life and education ==
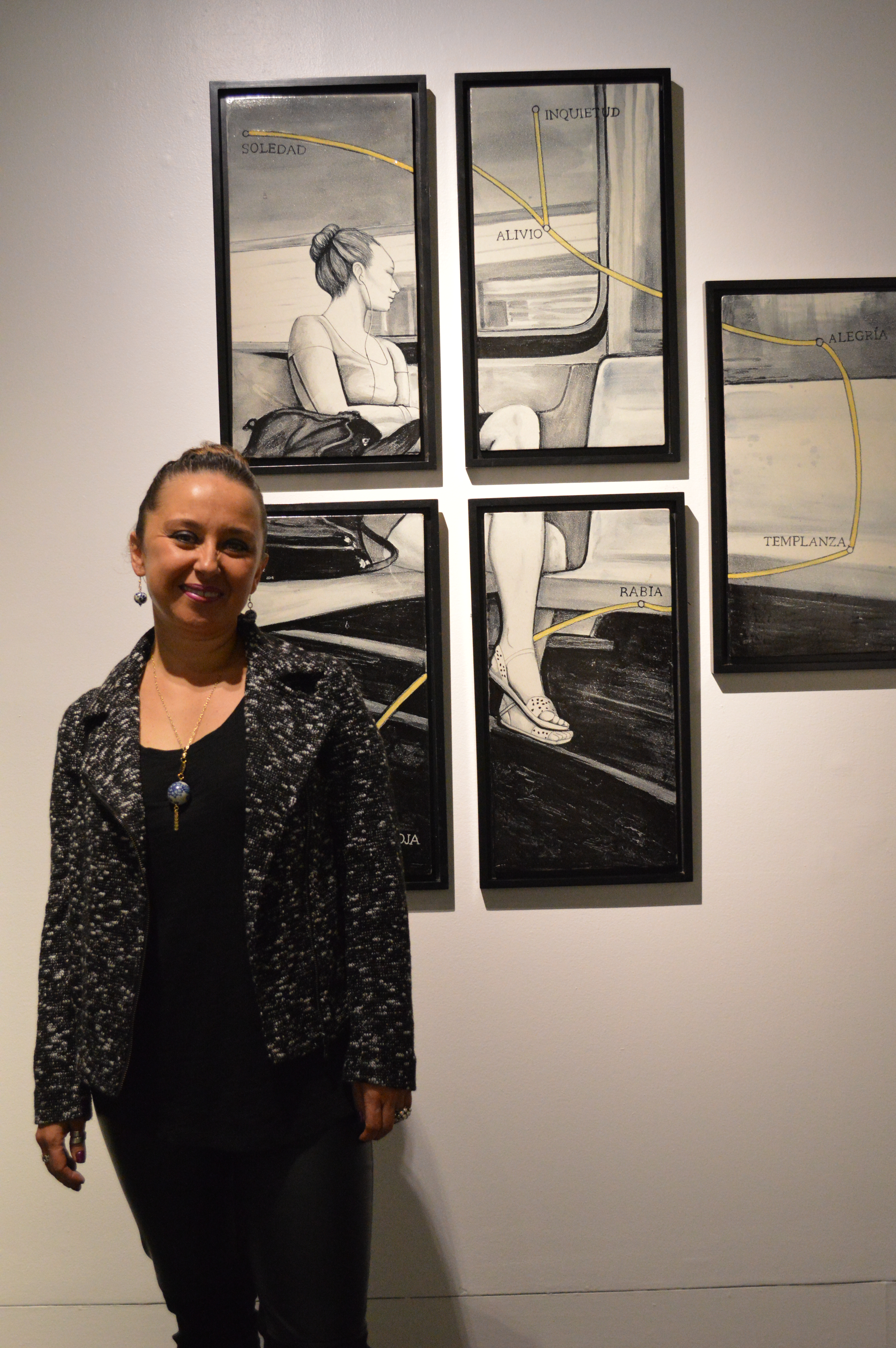
Diana Salazar with pieces in Talavera ceramic at the Museo de Arte Popular in Mexico City

Diana Salazar was born in Mexico City in 1972. She began her art studies at the Escuela Nacional de Artes Plásticas (today the Facultad de Artes y Diseño) of the National Autonomous University of Mexico, UNAM, earning her Bachelor's in 1994 and her master's degree in Art History at UNAM in 1999. As an undergraduate, she specialised in painting, photography and gravure printing. Her Masters thesis was “De la foto a la pintura, Influencias de la visión fotográfica en la mirada pictórica.” These studies were supported by the Jóvenes Creadores scholarships she received in 1995-1996 and 2000-2001, along with one from the UNAM Foundation.

In 1999, Salazar went to teach Spanish in Paris for a year at the Académie de Créteil under contract with the French Ministry of Education. While in France she created a series of paintings based on life in Paris which resulted in an exhibition and a printed catalog.

Salazar obtained a PhD in Arts and Design at the Facultad de Arte y Diseño with her thesis entitled “Desarrollo de un Seminario de Pintura Contemporánea. Memoria y propuestas en torno a la enseñanza de la pintura” which focuses on different approaches to art education, particularly painting, at professional levels. Salazar currently lives in Mexico City.

== Career ==
Salazar's career has been divided between painting and teaching, which she considers “jealous” disciplines, but that they also enrich each other. She began teaching at UNAM in 1995, principally basic level courses in visualization, graphic representation techniques, drawing and shape analysis. Since 2006, she has coordinated the Contemporary Painting Seminar at the Faculty,l and in 2008 she began teaching at the Master ’s level, principally painting in the Art and Design program, having directed over fifty research and artistic projects. She has also given classes various other public and private institutions and universities in Mexico. She has lectured internationally in Spain, Canada, England and Japan.

Her career as an artist also began in 1995 with her first individual exhibition at the Alianza Francesa in the San Ángel neighborhood of Mexico City. Since then, she has had over fifty individual and collective exhibitions in Mexico, North America, Europe and South America.

Her individual exhibitions include those at the Museo de Arte Popular in Mexico City (2014), the Fugaces Galería Arte Actual Mexicano in Monterrey (2008), Casa de Francia in Mexico City (2004), the Galería de Arte Contemporáneo y Diseño in Puebla (2004), The Other Gallery in Alberta, Canada, Galería Calakmul in Mexico City (2002), Galería de Ciencias y Artes in Hermosillo, Sonora (1998) and ENAP (1996) . Important collective exhibitions include those at the Centro de las Artes in Monterrey (2006, 2008, 2009, 2010, 2012), the Mexican Cultural Institute in San Antonio, Texas (2007), Museo Metropolitano de Monterrey (2003, 2005), Centro Nacional de las Artes in Mexico City (2002), the first Biennal of Fine Arts of Tamaulipas (2003), the Salón de Octubre in Guadalajara (2002), the Museo de la Ciudad de México (2002), Mairie de Bagnolet in France (2000) and the first Iberoamerican Biennal of Art in Lima, Peru .

Salazar has also worked with Uriarte Talavera to create ceramic pieces with her own designs.

Her artistic work has been recognized with membership in the Sistema Nacional de Creadores de Arte of CONACULTA (2012-2015), along with an honorary mention at the XXIII National Art Encounter in 2003 and residency at the Banff Centre for the Arts in Canada. In 2001 she won the Acquisition prize at the Salón de Octubre in Guadalajara and an honorary mention at the first INDART Painting Competition. Her teaching work was recognized in 2013 with the Reconocimiento Distinción Universidad Nacional Jóvenes Académico from UNAM.

Recognised art critics like Jaime Moreno Villareal, Teresa del Conde, Avelina Lésper, Elia Espinosa, Mariano Rivera Velázquez and Francisco Castro Leñero have written about her work.
