= Esperanza Rogel =

Ecuadorian politician

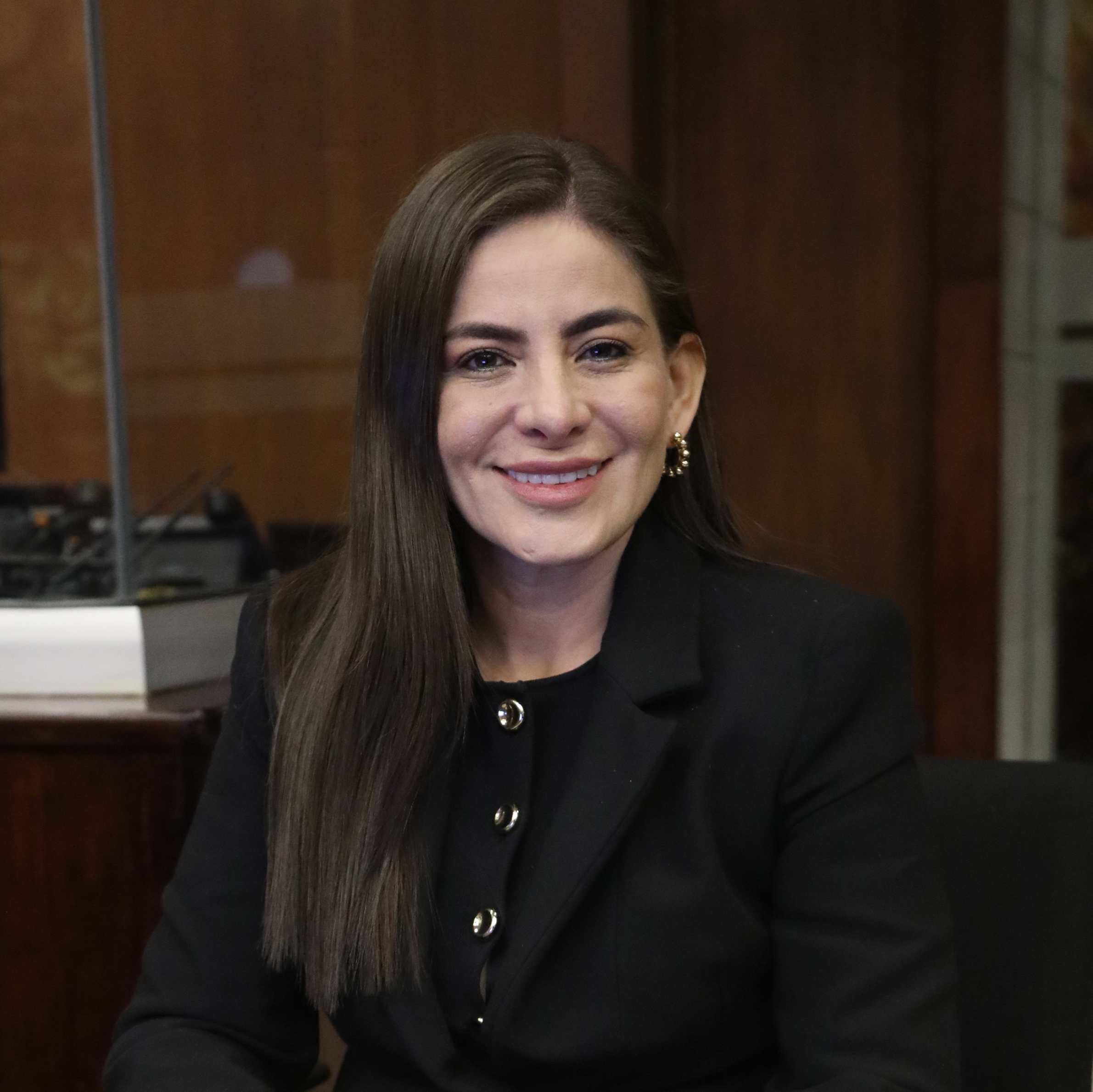
- Occupations: politician, lawyer
- Political party: National Democratic Action Movement

Esperanza Del Cisne Rogel is an Ecuadorian lawyer and politician. She was elected by the Province of Zamora Chinchipe in 2025 to attend the National Assembly.

== Life ==
Rogel has a master's degree in master's degree in Constitutional Law. She was elected by the voters of Province of Zamora Chinchipe to the National Assembly. In 2025 she was falsely accused of failing to attend the National Assembly by Neils Olsen. This was due to an error as Rogel was able to demonstrate that she did attend and that she did not need to pay the fines that had been introduced.

In July 2025 she made the unusual proposal of preventing any debate about the crisis that was facing her region. She argued that the Secretariat for Risk Management had resolved that there was a Regional State of Emergency. This empowered the authorities to create solutions to the problems. In this case debate in the assembly could only delay solutions. She said that he assembly members did not need to make party political points - her province needed action.

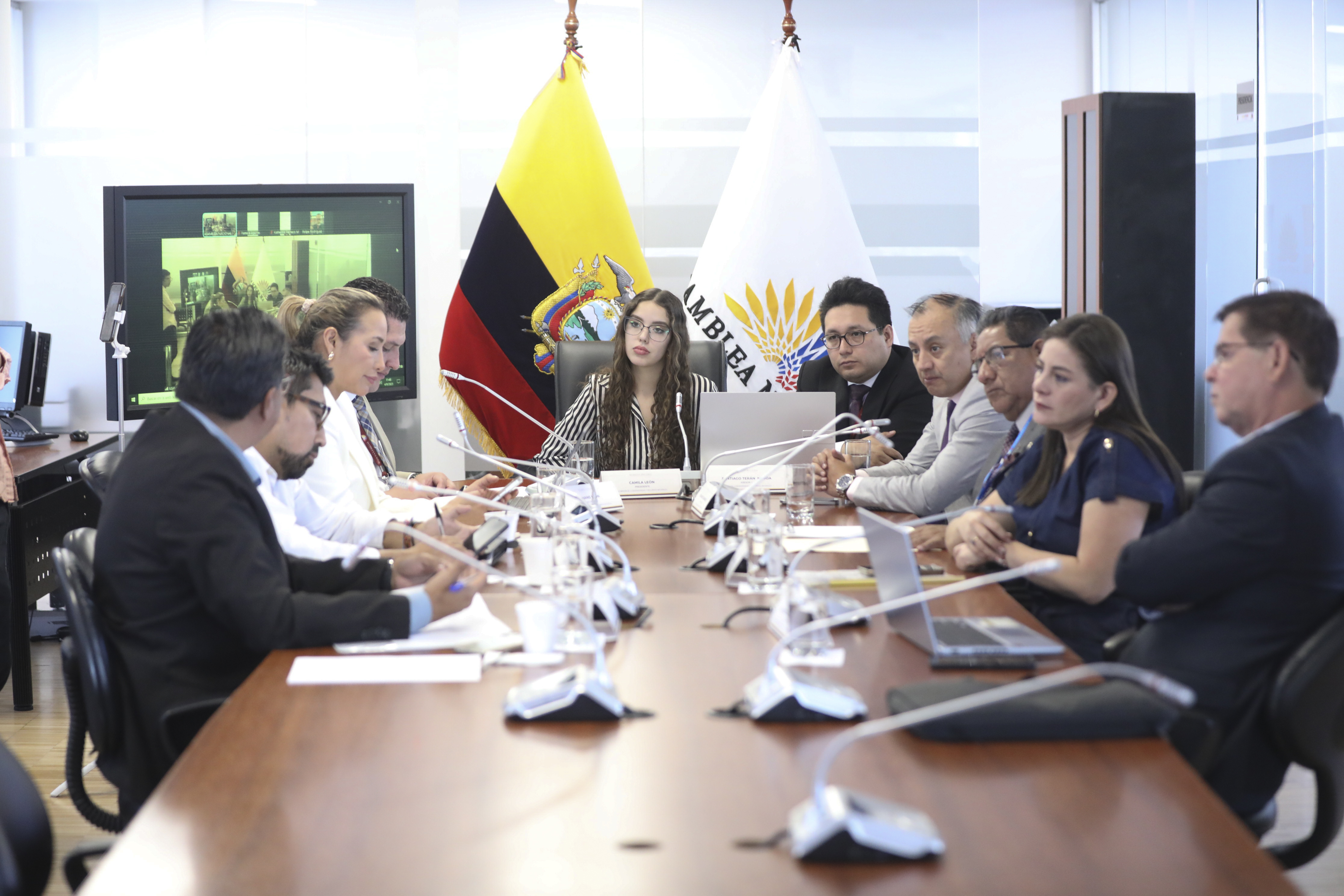
At the Assembly's Commission on Biodiversity and Natural Resources in 2025 she is on the right

In August the National Assembly decided to put in place a technical commission whose job was to oversee the creation of four new universities. The plenary decided to choose Rogel to be the Amazonian delegate on that commission.

She was re-elected in November 2025 as a member of the National Democratic Action Movement (ADN). Her alternate was Moreno Herrera Leibniz Brandon. She was then elected to the Assembly's Commission on Biodiversity and Natural Resources which was led by the 20 year old Camila León. Other members were Sade Fritschi, Pamela Aguirre, Jadira Bayas and Katherine Alexandra Pacheco Machuca.
