= Galo Arellano =

Ecuadorian journalist

- Born: January 19, 1979 (age 47); Quito, Ecuador
- Education: Politecnica Salesiana University
- Occupation: Journalist
- Awards: News and Documentary Emmy Awards (2022)

Galo Mauricio Arellano Armijos (born January 19, 1979) is an Ecuadorian journalist based in the United States. He has worked on several programs for the television networks Univision and Telemundo, including Primer Impacto and Al rojo vivo. In September 2022, he received an Emmy in the News and Documentary Emmy Awards as part of the Noticiero Univision team.

== Biography ==
Galo Mauricio Arellano Armijos completed his secondary education at the Colegio Spellman, where he was the president of the Journalism Club. He later enrolled at the Politecnica Salesiana University. His first experience with the media was at the age of 15 with Radio Latina FM 88. He later worked in radio stations such as Radio Majestad and HOT 106.

Galo Arellano worked as a reporter for the television network Ecuavisa on the program Dentro y Fuera, which introduced him to people at the American television network Univision. In 2000, he immigrated to the United States and began working as a media correspondent for Univision on the Primer Impacto program, for which he had already carried out some reporting while still in Ecuador. Among the events he covered during his time with the network include the September 11 attacks in 2001.

Later, Galo Arellano moved to Telemundo and joined the team headed by journalist María Celeste Arrarás. He began working as a correspondent for the program Al Rojo vivo, and remained with the network for seven years. In 2009, he created the program Ecuatorianos en el mundo for the Ecuavisa network, in which he brought out reports on the experiences of Ecuadorian migrants living in different foreign countries. The show later moved to the public television network Ecuador TV. In 2010, he returned to Univision and began working on the program Noticiero Univision.

Galo Arellano received his first Emmy award nomination for the News and Documentary Emmy Awards in 2017, as part of the Noticiero Univision team. On 22 September 2022, the team was declared as the winner of the category "Best Spanish News Program" in the 43rd News and Documentary Emmy Awards.

== Personal life ==
In June 2021, Galo Arellano was the subject of a series of homophobic insults after a post on social media that included a photo of his husband, the Mexican architect Arturo Ochoa, with whom he had been married for four years. Following the attacks, Galo Arellano received support from the Andean Foundation for Media Observation and Study (Fundamedios).
