= Jadira Bayas =

Ecuadorian politician

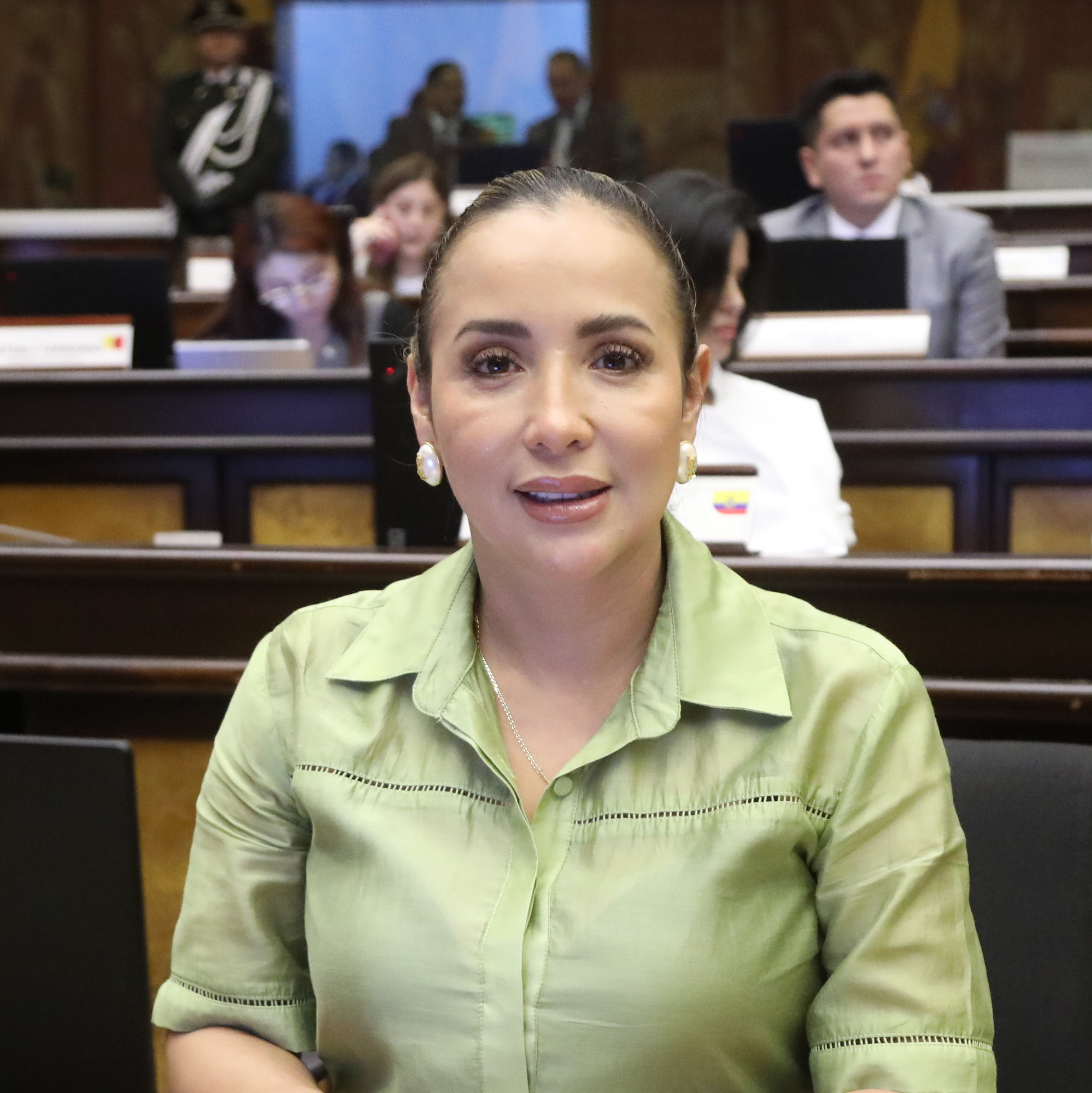
- Education: Casa Grande University
- Occupation: politician
- Known for: member of the National Assembly
- Political party: National Democratic Action (ADN)

Jadira del Rosario Bayas Uriarte sometimes Yadira Bayas is a politician in Ecuador. She is a member of the National Democratic Action (ADN) party and she represents Santo Domingo de los Tsáchilas in the National Assembly.

== Life ==
Bayas' father died when she was five and she spent time in Italy as a child where her mother was working.

She was a councillor and at times the Deputy Mayor in the Municipal Government of Santo Domingo from 2005 to 2009.

She graduated from Casa Grande University in Guayaquil with a degree and a master's degree in Business Administration.

In 2024 she was recognised for her work supporting local culture when she was given Tsáchila nationality.

She was kidnapped in January 2025 by four men who forced her into a taxi. Her husband contacted the authorities and she was released when three of the men were arrested. The motive was said to a ransom demand and the police were able to find them as they determined the location of a mobile phone.

In July 2025 an accusation of early political campaigning for rejected by her party because of unconvincing evidence. It was said that she had been campaigning before it was officially allowed. The case had been made by the National Electoral Council's Diana Atamaint and the provincial director of the Patriotic Society Party.

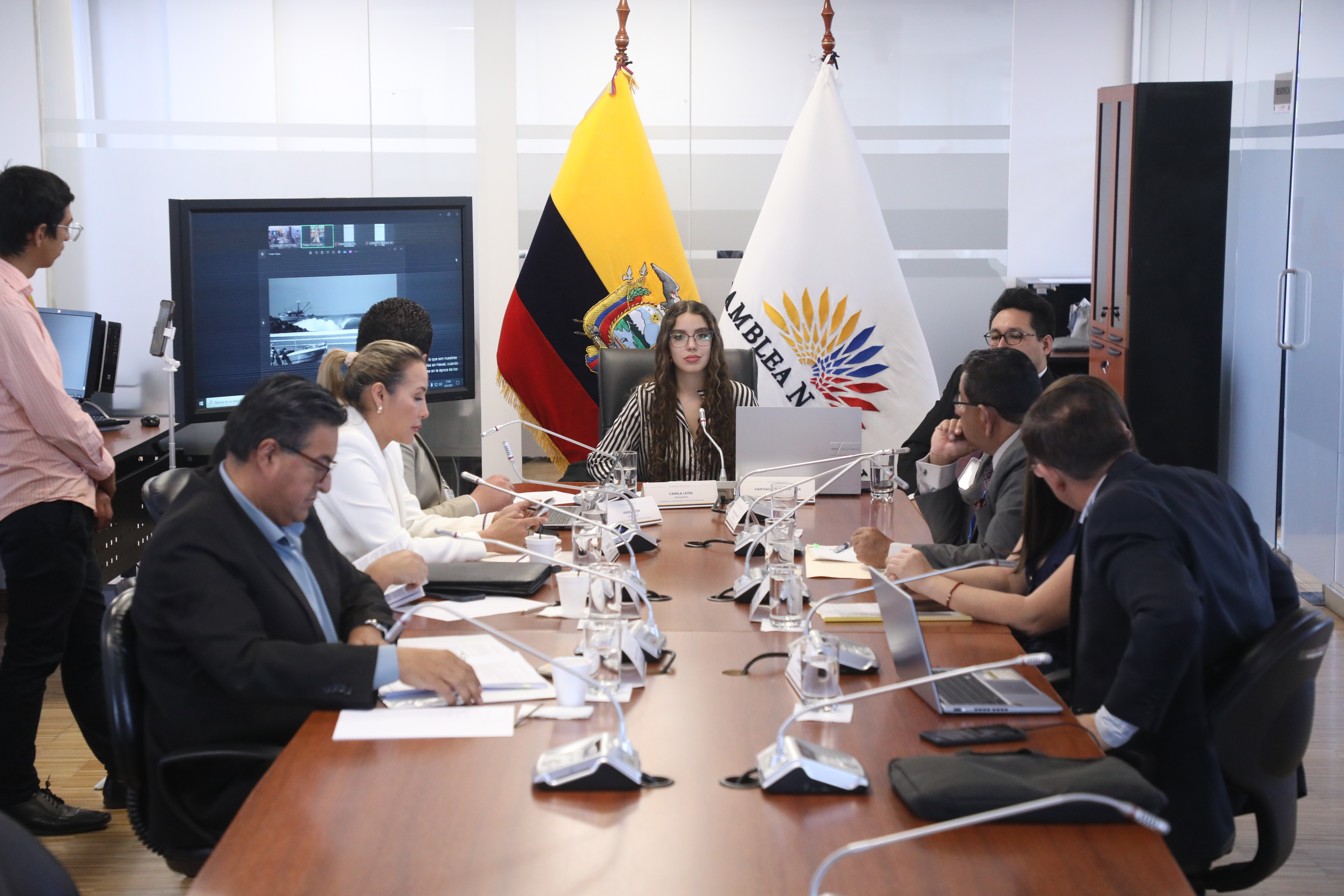
Jadira Bayas on left, Camila León in the chair, 4 Sept 2025

Bayas was elected to the National Assembly in November 2025. She was then elected to the Assembly's Commission on Biodiversity and Natural Resources which was led by the 20 year old Camila León. Other members were Sade Fritschi, Pamela Aguirre, Esperanza Rogel and Katherine Alexandra Pacheco Machuca.

In October 2025, another assembly member, María Cristina Acuña, called for the suspension of Bayas, from her political party, after she alleged that Bayas used her photo instead of being on a virtual call.
