= Editorial Abya Yala =

Publisher based in Quito, Ecuador

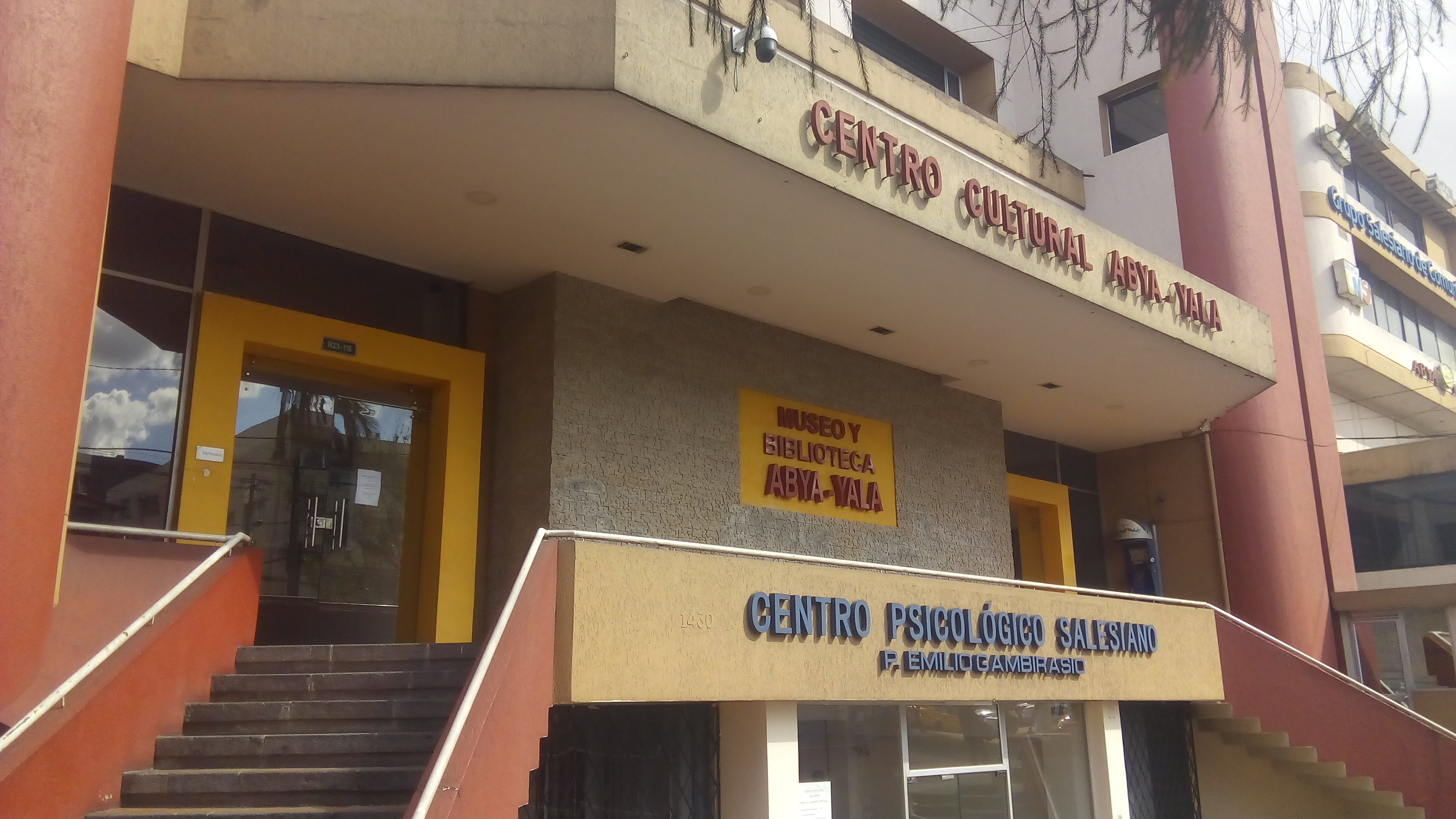
- Founded: 1975
- Founder: Juan Bottasso
- Country of origin: Ecuador
- Headquarters location: Quito
- Owner: Politecnica Salesiana University
- Official website: abyayala.org.ec

The Editorial Abya Yala is an publishing house based in Quito, Ecuador, focusing on the history and culture of indigenous and Afro-American peoples. It is considered one of the largest social science publishing houses in Latin America.

By 2025, the publishing house had over 3,000 published books from 4,000 different authors.

== History ==
The publishing house was founded in 1975 by Italian salesian missionary Juan Bottasso. The idea for the publishing house arose after Bottasso became interested in the culture of the Shuar people, leading him to begin editing and publishing Mundo Shuar, a series of texts based on interviews conducted by Salesian missionaries with members of the Shuar communities to discuss their worldview and experiences.

In 1997, the publishing house launched its website and became the first Ecuadorian publisher to sell digital books.
