= Sade Fritschi =

Ecuadorian politician (born 1997)

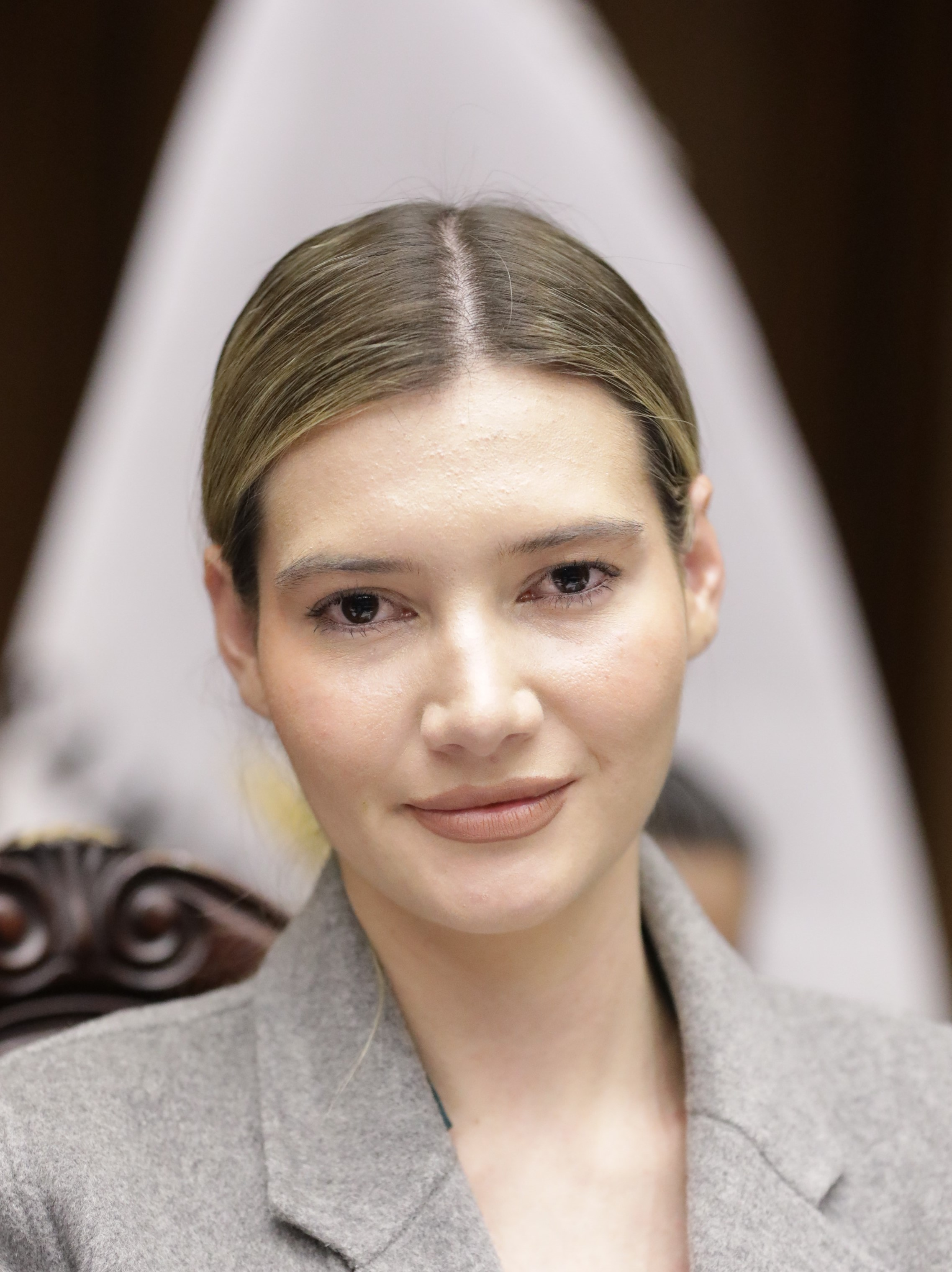
- Fritschi in 2024

Member of the National Assembly
- Incumbent
- Assumed office 14 May 2025
- Constituency: National constituency

Minister of the Environment
- In office 23 November 2023 – 30 August 2024
- President: Daniel Noboa
- Preceded by: José Antonio Dávalos
- Succeeded by: Inés Manzano

Personal details
- Born: 1997 (age 28–29) Imbabura Province, Ecuador
- Education: Oxford Brookes University
- Occupation: Politician

Sade Rashel Fritschi Naranjo (born c. 1997) is an Ecuadorian politician who was the Minister of the Environment from 2023 until 2024 during the first Daniel Noboa administration. She was elected to the National Assembly in 2025.

== Personal life ==
Fritschi was born in the Imbabura Province, but she was raised on the Galápagos Islands.

== Career ==
Fritschi became known when she ran Daniel Noboa's presidential campaign in the Galápagos. Her critics say that she has no other record of running a major project or department.

=== Environmental minister ===
In 2023 the new President Daniel Noboa named her as his Minister of the Environment. She was 26 and the youngest Secretary of State ever appointed as a cabinet minister. She was named before other ministers. Another cabinet member was 30 years old and questions were raised about Fritschi's academic qualifications as her degree was not officially registered. She states in her CV that she has a degree in International Tourism Management.

There was a controversy over planning permission that was given to Lavinia Valbonesi who was the President's wife. The permission was given two weeks after the President Daniel Noboa had taken power. The land belonged to the President's wife, but it was the President who had bought the land and his family had a beach residence there. Planning was granted for a "resort", for the construction of new buildings and the destruction of a forest that the local community of Oloncito had campaigned to have protected. The proposal was withdrawn by the First Lady's company within days.

=== National Assembly ===
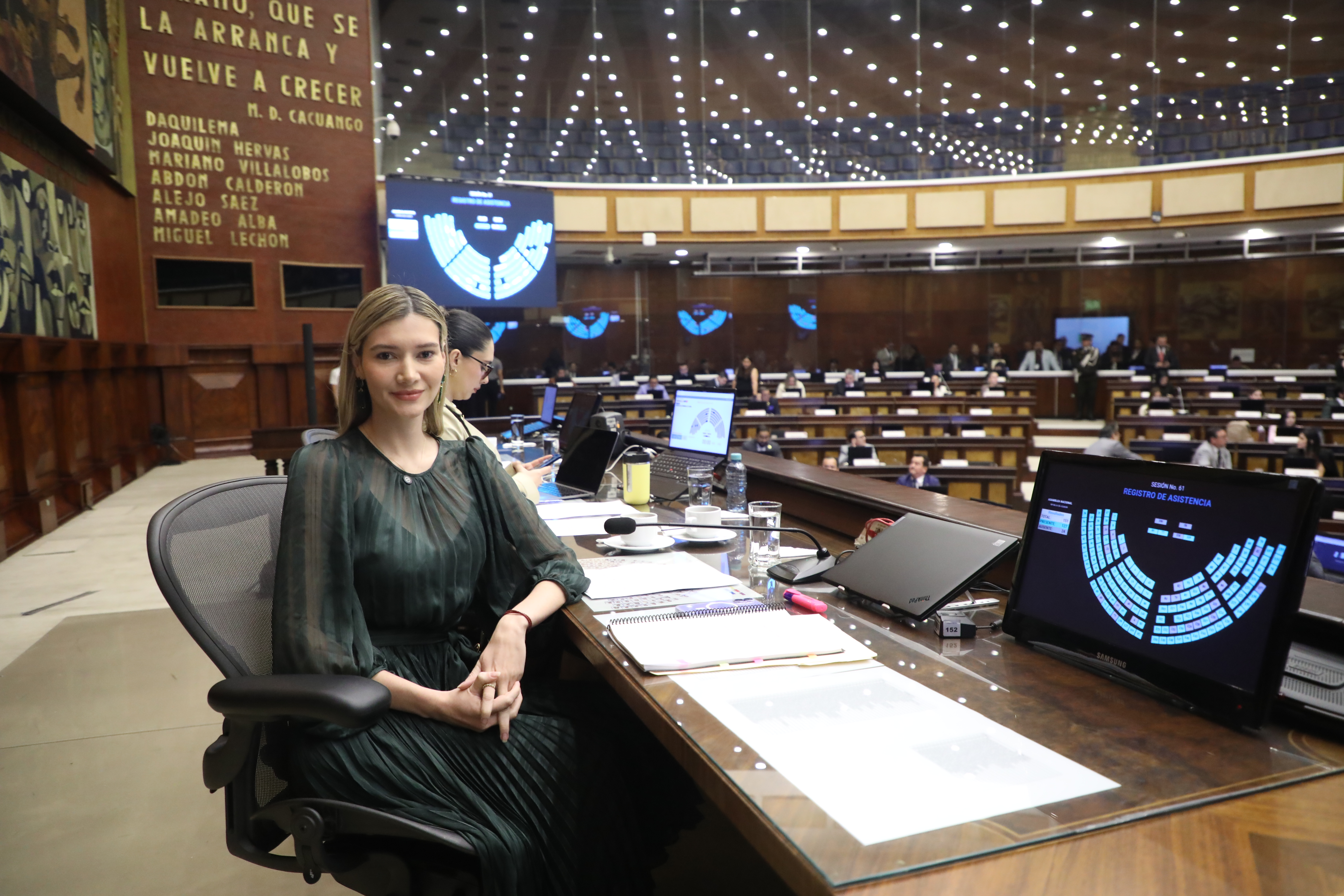
Fritschi presiding at the National Assembly on 15 January 2026

She was reelected to the National Assembly in 2025. She was on the party's national list which included Diana Blacio, Annabella Azin and Diana Jácome. In May 2025 she became the first elected to the influential Legislative Administration Council. She was elected to the National Assembly's Commission on Biodiversity and Natural Resources which was led by the 20 year old Camila León. Other members were Jadira Del Rosario Bayas Uriarte, Pamela Aguirre, Esperanza Rogel and Katherine Alexandra Pacheco Machuca.
