= María Cristina Acuña =

Ecuadorian politician

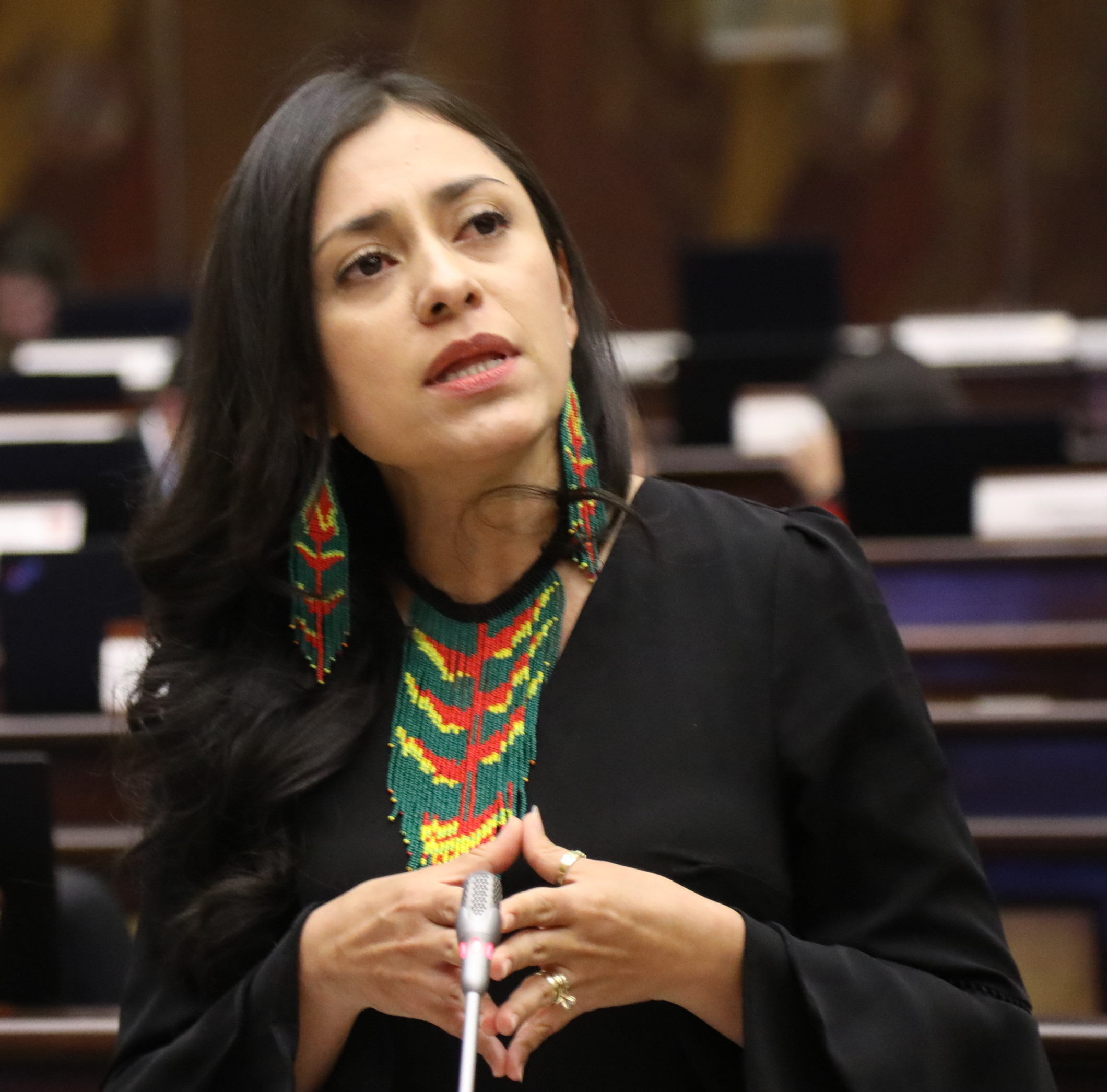
María Cristina Acuña in 2025.

María Cristina Acuña Vaca is an Ecuadorian politician who was elected to Ecuador's National Assembly for the governing party, National Democratic Action in February 2025 following the 2025 Ecuadorian general election. She is a member of the National Assembly for the Pastaza province.

She was elected to the Economic Regime Commission. Nathaly Farinango was the commission's president and Adrián Castro was the vice-president. The eight members of the commission also included Mónica Alemán, Mariuxi Sanchez, Liliana Durán and Maria del Cisne Molina Coro.

In August 2025, she supports a reform to prevent political parties from being funded by the state.

In October 2025, she called for the suspension of Jadira Bayas, from her political party, who used her photo instead of being on a virtual call.
