= Mónica Alemán =

Ecuadorian politician

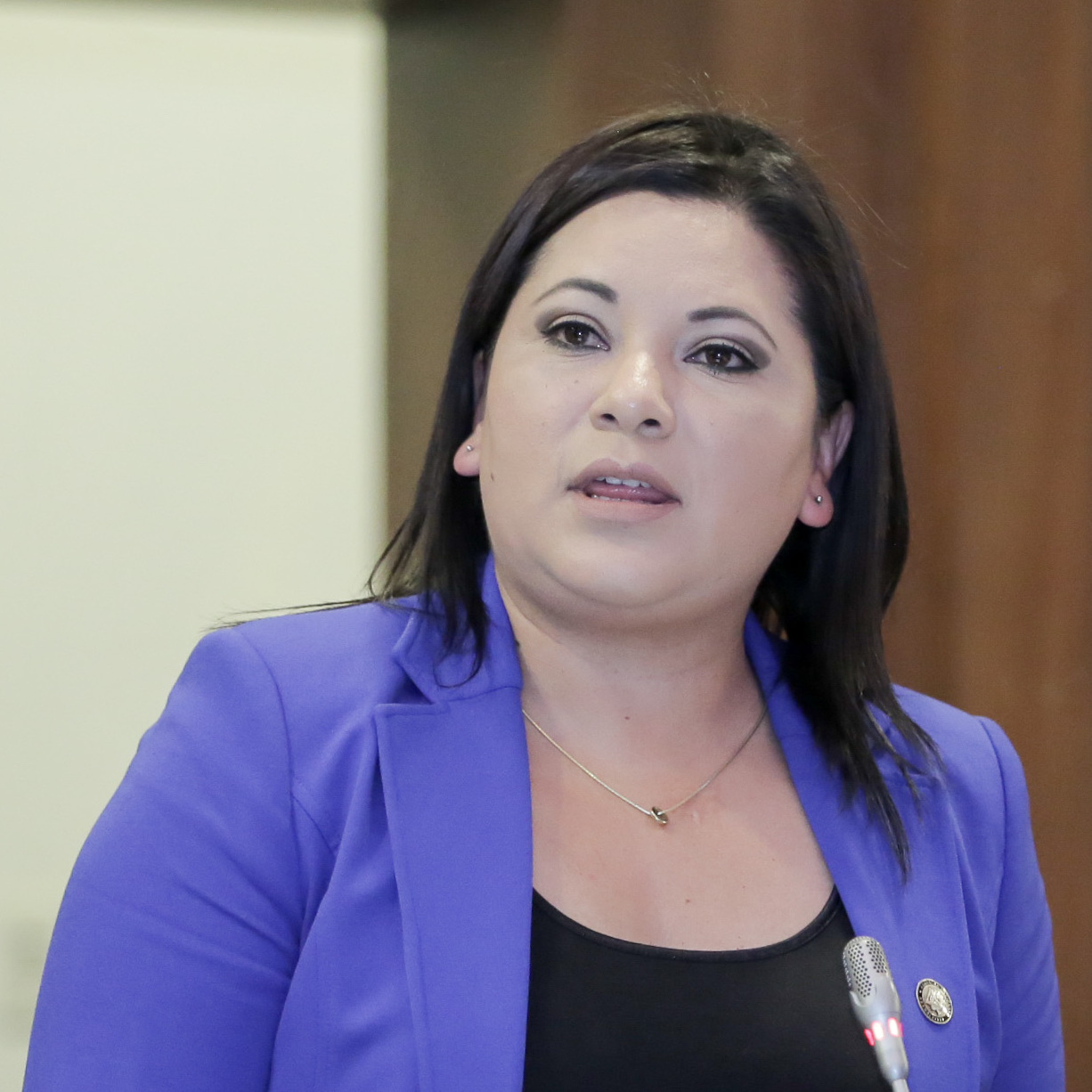
- Born: c.1980
- Other name: Mónica Rocío Alemán Mármol
- Occupation: politician
- Known for: former member of the National Assembly

Mónica Rocío Alemán Mármol is a politician from Ecuador. She was elected to the National Assembly. She led the introduction of legislation to reduce domestic violence.

== Life ==
She was born in about 1980.

When Nelson Serrano was elected to the National Assembly his named alternate was Aleman. Serrano covered for him on a number of occasions. Her main job was in Pichincha working on the Cayambe – Pedro Moncayo Irrigation System for the provincial government. Serrano died in December 2015 and Aleman took his place in the assembly.

In 2017 Alemán led the "Occasional Commission for violence against women" at the National Assembly. The commission drafted a new law "Comprehensive Organic Law to Prevent and Eradicate Violence Against Women". It combined proposals made by the President Lenin Moreno and the Parliamentary group looking at Women's Rights. Its aim is to prevent violence. In June of the same year the Assembly's Parliamentary Group for the Guarantee of the Rights of Girls, Boys, Adolescents and Young People was formed with over fifty assembly members interested. Aleman and Franklin Samaniego put together plans and convened commissions to move the concerns forward.

In 2021 she was one of the National Assembly's supporters of Cuba in its dispute with the USA's trade sanctions. Before the elections in February, she requested unpaid leave from the assembly so that she could take part in the elections. 42 other members also made the same request including Wilma Andrade, Esther Cuesta Santana, Cristina Reyes, Dallyana Passailaigue and Verónica Arias. During her absence her job would be carried out by her substitute.

In 2025 she was again the National Assembly and she was elected to the Economic Regime Commission. Nathaly Farinango was the president and Adrián Castro was the vice-president. The eight members of the commission also included Liliana Durán, Mariuxi Sanchez, Maria Cristina Acuña Vaca and Maria del Cisne Molina Coro.
