= Nathaly Farinango =

Ecuadorian politician

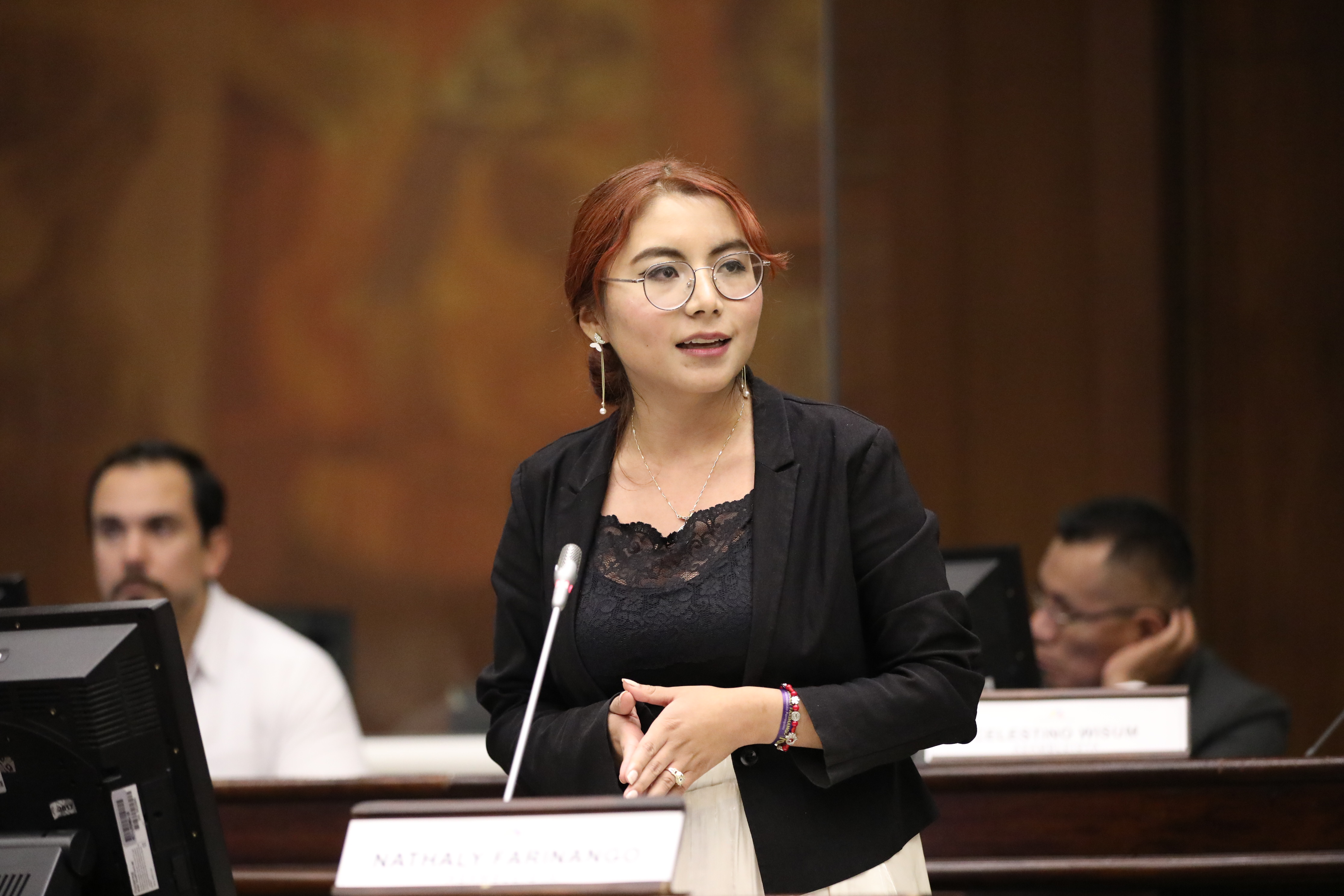
- in 2023
- Born: 2000 (age 25–26)
- Occupation: politician
- Political party: National Democratic Action

Nathaly Estefania Farinango Delgado (born 2000) is an Ecuadorian politician for the National Democratic Action. She represents the Province of Pichincha in the National Assembly.

== Life ==
Farinango was born in 2000 and she was the youngest person elected to the National Assembly when she was 23. She sits on the Permanent Commission on Economic and Tax Regime and its Regulation and Control. She was elected to that commission in 2023.

On the 3 June she proposed a change to the law which effects unemployment benefit. She intended to shorten the period from 60 to 30 days. She proposed that any person who has paid 24 consecutive monthly payments would receive benefit if the applied in the 45 days following the 31 days of unemployment.

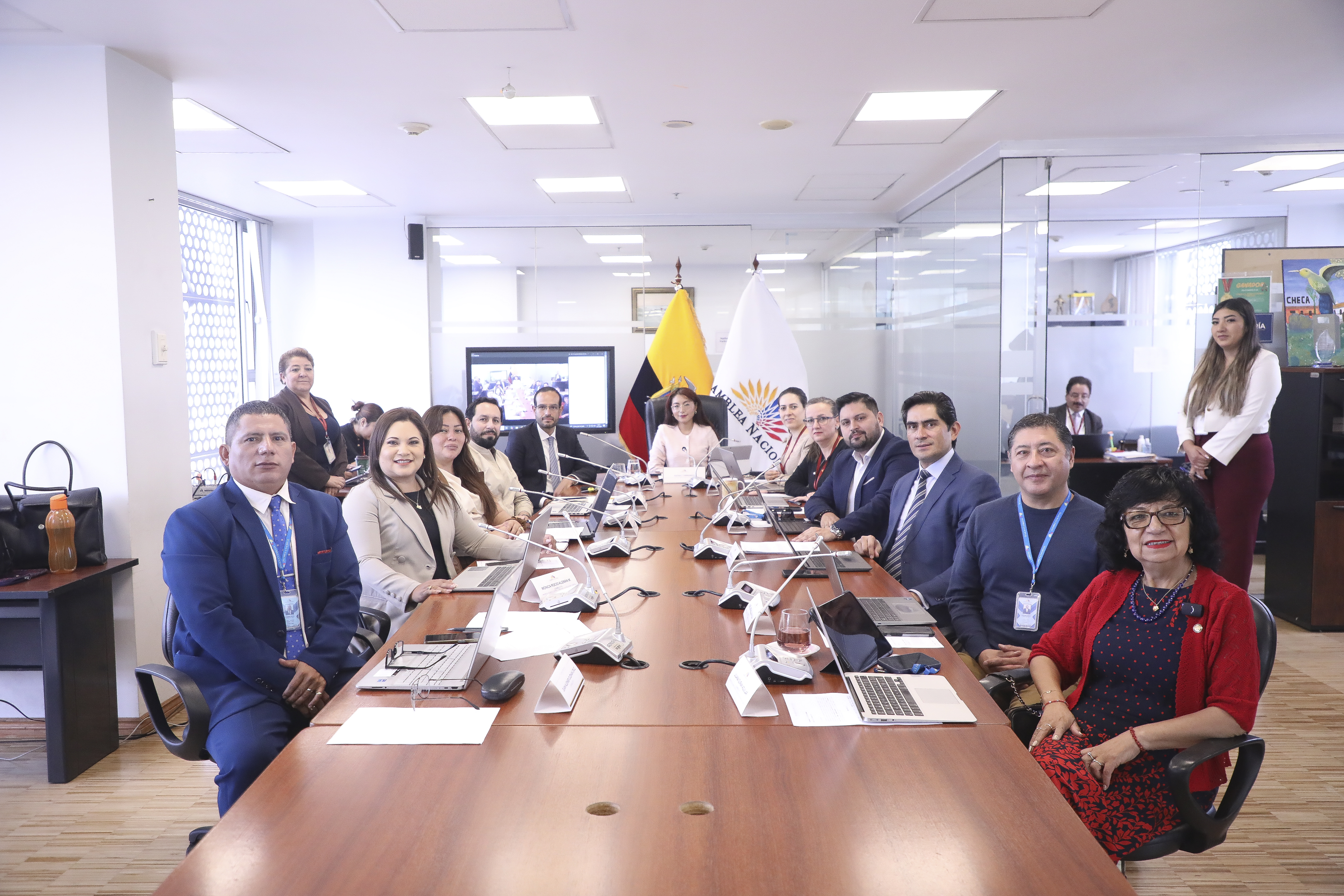
President of the National Assembly's Economic Regime Commission in 2026

In 2025 she was the president of the National Assembly's Economic Regime Commission and fellow National Democratic Action (ADN) member Adrián Castro was the vice-president. The eight members of the commission included Mónica Alemán, Liliana Durán, Mariuxi Sanchez, Maria Cristina Acuña Vaca and Maria del Cisne Molina Coro.
