= Verónica Arias =

Ecuadorian politician

Veronica Elizabeth Arias Fernandez
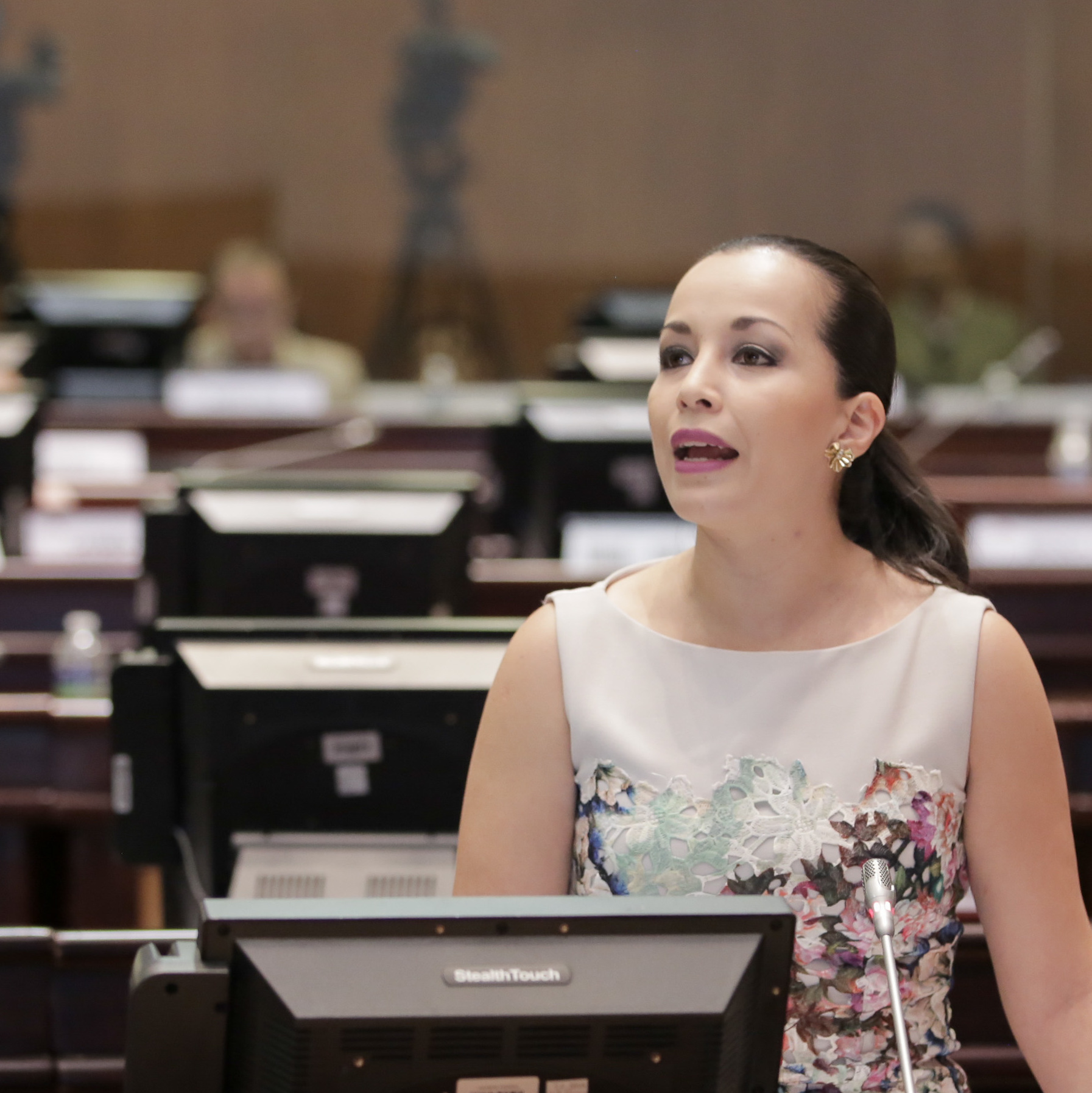
- November 2017

National Assembly of Ecuador
- In office 2017–2021

National Assembly of Ecuador
- In office 2013–2017

Personal details
- Born: August 31, 1983 (age 42) Loja, Ecuador
- Party: Union for Hope
- Occupation: Politician

Veronica Elizabeth Arias Fernandez (born August 31, 1983, Loja, Ecuador) is an Ecuadorian politician, activist and lawyer. She was a member of the National Assembly of Ecuador. She was elected into the National Assembly of Ecuador between 2017 and 2021 through the Union for Hope political party. She served in the National Assembly Commission on Worker's Right and Social Security.

Before the elections in February, she requested unpaid leave from the assembly so that she could take part in the elections. Forty-two other members also made the same request including Wilma Andrade and Mónica Alemán. During her absence her job would be carried out by her substitute. On February 7, 2021, she was elected into the Andean Parliament.
