= Liliana Durán =

Politician from Ecuador

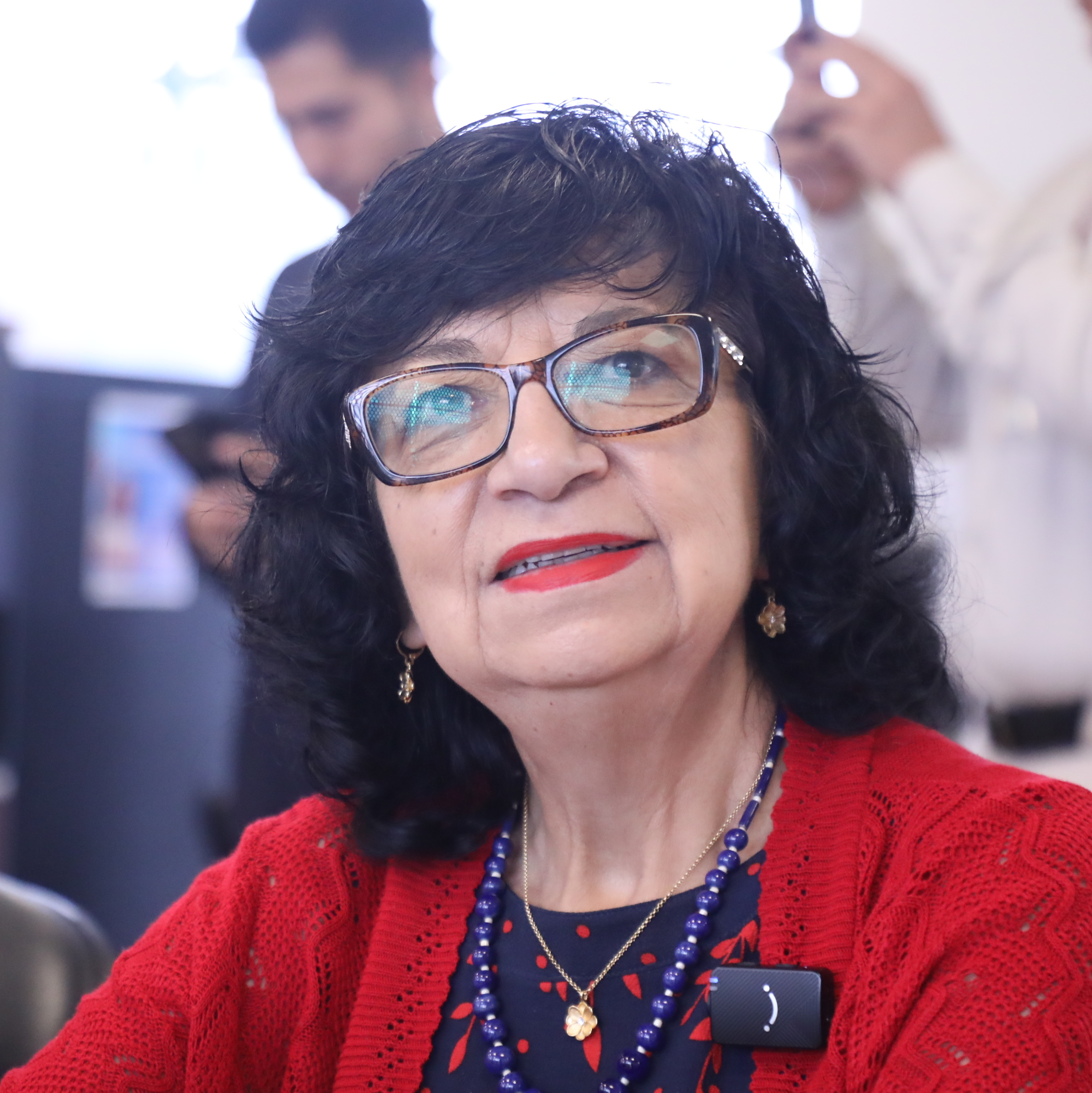
- in 2026
- Born: Zaruma
- Education: Politecnica Salesiana University
- Occupation: politician
- Known for: member of the National Assembly
- Political party: Citizen Revolution Movement

Liliana Elizabeth Duran Aguilar is an Ecuadorian politician who is a member of the National Assembly. She is a member of the Citizen Revolution Movement and she was elected in 2017 and in 2025.

== Biography ==
Durán was born in the part of the city of Zaruma known as Abañín.

She graduated from the Salesian Polytechnic University after studying Sustainable Local Development Management.

In 2017, she was elected to the National Assembly and led the Permanent Specialized Commission on Workers' Rights and Social Security.

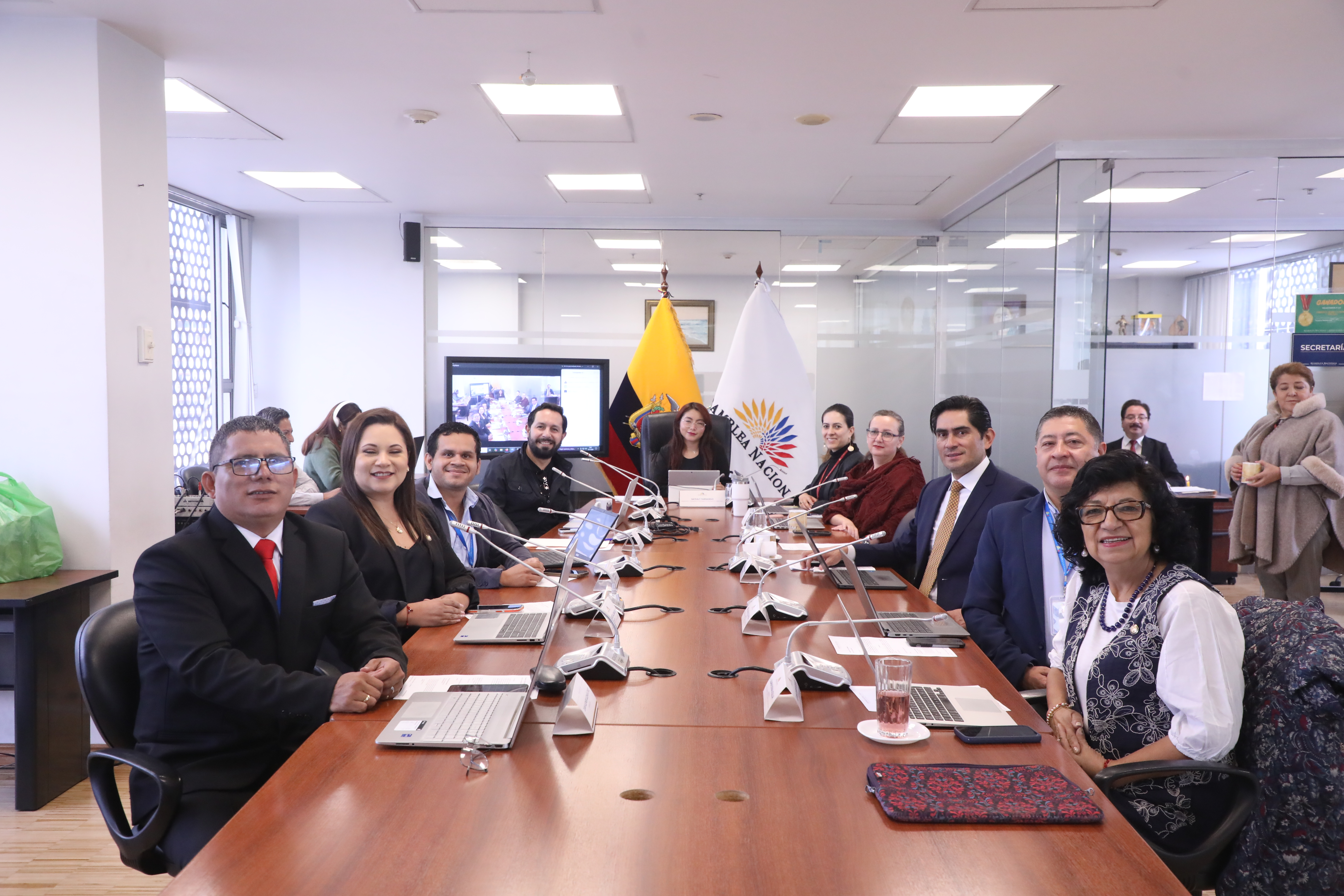
The Economic Regime Commission in 2026, Nathaly Farinango is the president and Durán is on the right

As a member of the Citizen Revolution Movement, she was on the RETO Movement party's national list which included Paola Cabezas and Priscila Schettini in 2025.

Her substitute was Viteri Tassi Akangau. She was elected to the Economic Regime Commission and served under president Nathaly Farinango and vice-president Adrián Castro. Other members of the commission were Mónica Alemán, Mariuxi Sanchez, Maria Cristina Acuña Vaca, and Maria del Cisne Molina Coro.

Durán called for the impeachment of Mario Godoy, president of the Council of the Judiciary. Similar calls were expressed, in January 2026, by Viviana Veloz, Daniel Noboa, Franklin Samaniego, and Raúl Chávez.
