= Maria del Cisne Molina Coro =

Politician from Ecuador

Maria Del Cisne Molina Coro
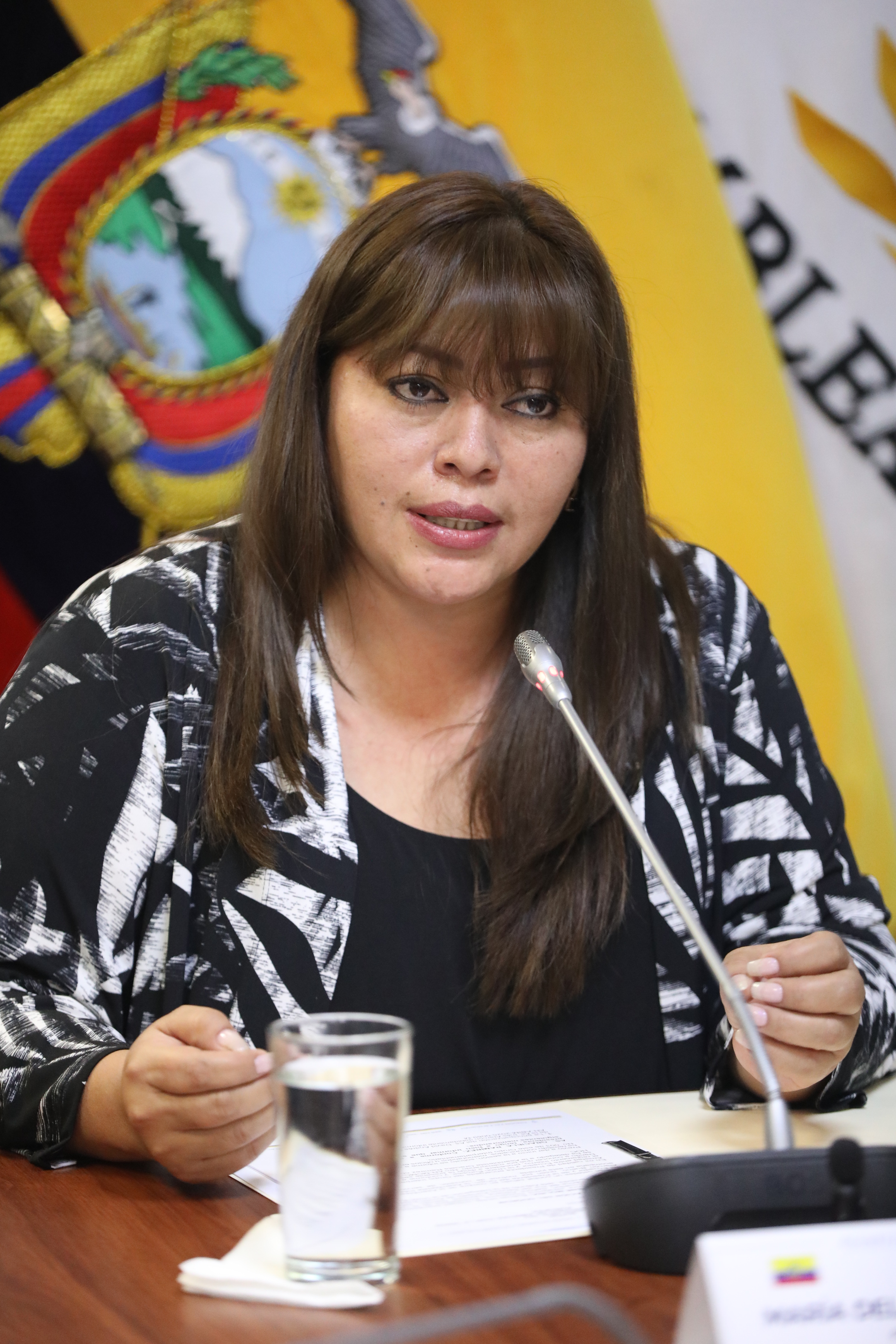
- Occupation: politician
- Known for: National Assembly member
- Political party: National Democratic Action

Maria Del Cisne Molina Coro is an Ecuadorian politician who was elected to the National Assembly in 2025.

== Biography ==
In 2025, she was elected as one of the National Democratic Action (ADN)'s member of the National Assembly. She was elected by the Province of Pichincha and her substitute is Guerrero Mena Juan Fernando.

In 2025, the eight members of the Assembly's Economic Regime Commission included her as well as Mónica Alemán, Liliana Durán, Mariuxi Sanchez and Maria Cristina Acuña Vaca. Nathaly Farinango was the commission's president and another fellow National Democratic Action (ADN) member, Adrián Castro, was the vice-president.

In July 2025, the President of the National Assembly, Niels Olsen, declared that the (40) relatives of assembly members should not be employed by the assembly as employees. Molina was mentioned as her nephews and sister, Lía Paulina Molina Coro, were employed. In August she was elected to be the secretary of the Inter parliamentary group between Ecuador and the European Union. Inés Alarcón was the President and the members included Analisse Josebeth Jaramillo Rodriguez, Diana Patricia Blacio Carrion and Cecilia Baltazar.

She was elected to the National Assembly's Economic Regime Commission where Nathaly Farinango was the president. The eight members of the commission also included Mónica Alemán, Mariuxi Sanchez, Maria Cristina Acuña Vaca and Liliana Durán.
