= Camila León =

Ecaudorian National Assembly member

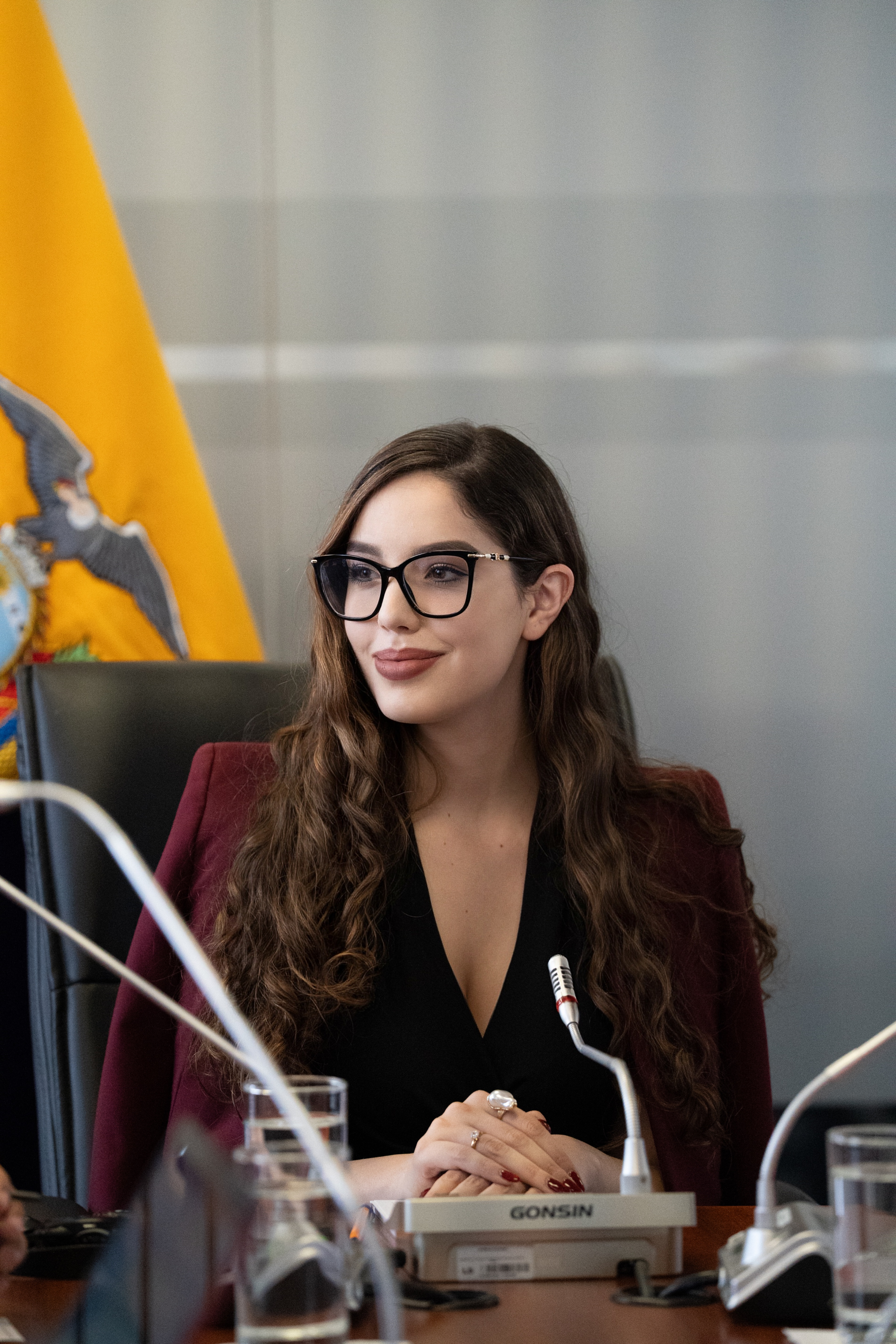
- León in 2026
- Born: c.2004 Azuay Province
- Education: International University of La Rioja
- Occupation: politician
- Political party: National Democratic Action

Camila León Cueva (born c.2004) is an Ecuadorian politician and member of National Assembly. She serves as Chair of the Permanent Specialized Commission on Biodiversity and Natural Resources.

== Life ==
León was born in Azuay Province in 2004. She studies political science at the International University of La Rioja and before she has graduated she was elected to the National Assembly to represent Azuay Province. She is member of the governing party, National Democratic Action,

She was elected to lead the Commission on Biodiversity and Natural Resources. Other members were Jadira Bayas, Sade Rashel Fritschi Naranjo, Esperanza Del Cisne Rogel, Pamela Aguirre Zambonino and Katherine Alexandra Pacheco Machuca.

Her legislative work focuses on biodiversity conservation, natural resource management, environmental protection, the preservation of Ecuador's natural heritage, and reforms to the justice system. Among the legislative initiatives she has introduced is the Organic Law on Recourse for the Recovery of State Financial Resources, which seeks to establish mechanisms for the recovery of public funds in accordance with Ecuadorian law. She has also sponsored several legislative proposals related to environmental governance, biodiversity protection, and judicial reform.As part of her legislative responsibilities, León has participated in consultations and dialogue with local communities, civil society organizations, productive sectors, and other stakeholders to gather input for the development and review of legislative initiatives. She has also promoted opportunities for youth participation in public policy discussions and legislative processes.
