= National Democratic Action Movement =

Political party in the Gambia

The National Democratic Action Movement (NDAM) is a political party in the Gambia. NDAM was formed by Waa Juwara in 2001, following the presidential election that year. Juwara broke away from the United Democratic Party, accusing the party leader Ousainou Darboe of complacency.

In 2005, the party joined the opposition National Alliance for Democracy and Development (NADD) coalition.
