= Pamela Aguirre =

Ecuadorian lawyer and politician

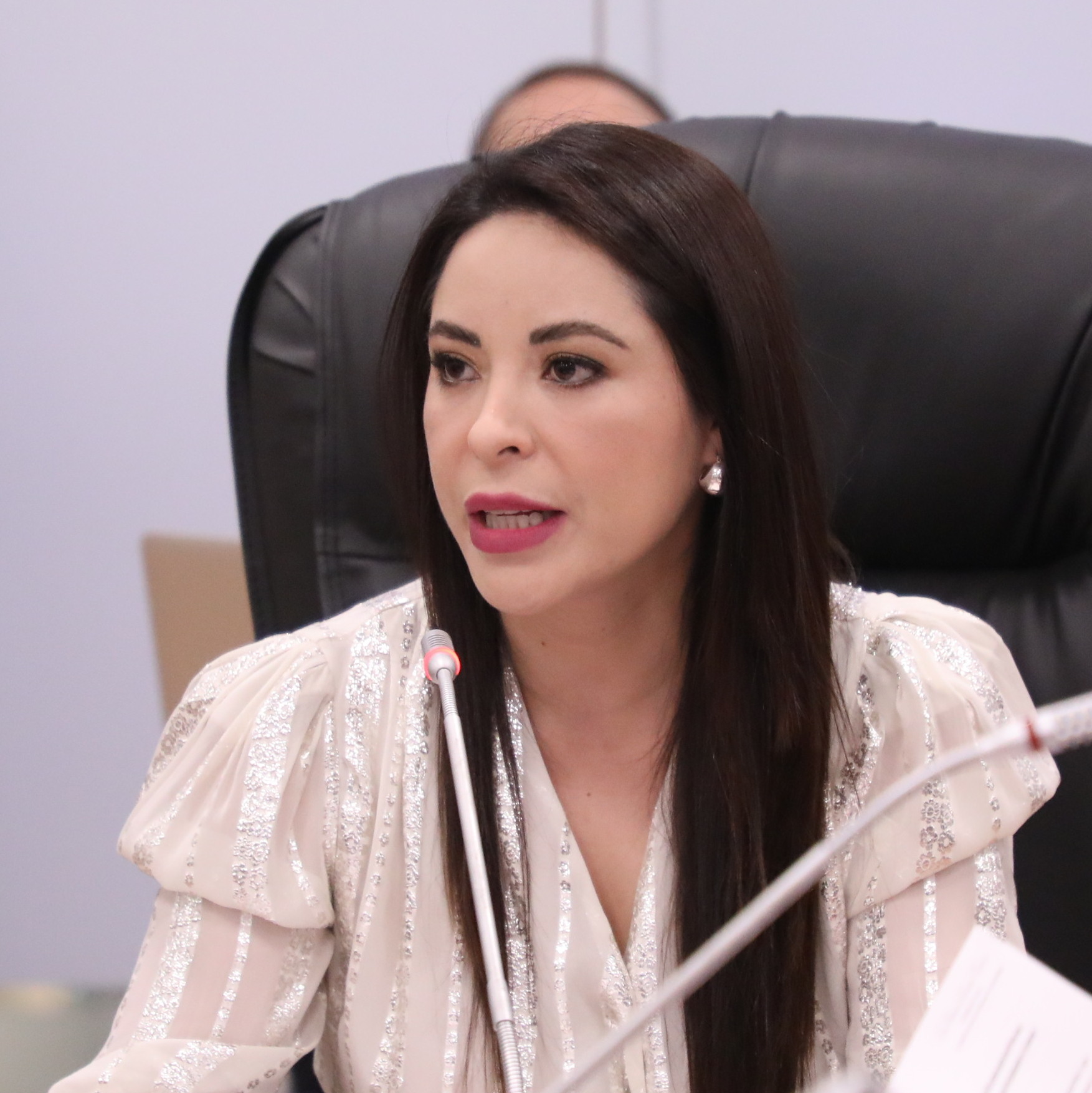
- in 2023

Member of the Andean Parliament
- Incumbent
- Assumed office May 19, 2017
- Constituency: Ecuador

Personal details
- Born: Pamela Alejandra Aguirre Zambonino; December 22, 1984 (age 41) Quito, Ecuador
- Party: The Citizens' Revolution
- Occupation: Lawyer, politician
- Website: www.pameaguirre.com

Pamela Alejandra Aguirre Zambonino (born December 22, 1984) is an Ecuadorian lawyer and politician. She is member of the Andean Parliament since 2017.

In 2019 she was the vice-president of the Andean Parliament's Second Commission of Education, Culture, Science, Information Technology, and Communication. In addition, she is part of the Special Commission on Women and Gender Equity. During her first year in office she was president of both commissions.

She was a member of the Euro-Latin American Parliamentary Assembly (EuroLat), a space in which she participates in the Women's Forum, the Meeting with Civil Society, and the Commission for Sustainable Development, Environment, Politics, Energy, Research, Innovation, and Technology.

She was awarded as one of the 100 most influential political professionals of 2017, within the framework of the Napolitan Victory Awards.

She holds a law degree from the Pontifical Catholic University of Ecuador and a Master's in Image Consulting and Political Consultancy and Specialist in Government Management and Electoral Campaigns from Camilo José Cela University in Spain. She also studied journalism at the University of the Americas, and participated in the international program in Political Consultancy and Government Management at San Francisco University of Quito.

== Early life and education ==
Pamela Aguirre Zambonino was born in Quito on December 22, 1984. She spent her childhood in Ibarra, Imbabura Province, the birthplace of her father, a general practitioner who spent 35 years in the peasant communities of Pesillo and Olmedo, and her mother, an obstetrician.

She completed her primary and secondary studies at the Sacred Heart College of Jesús Bethlemitas in Ibarra. After completing her secondary education, she traveled to France to pursue a literary specialty at the Lyceé Val de Durance Vauclause.

Upon her return to Ecuador, she began her legal studies at the Pontifical Catholic University and obtained licentiates in Legal Science and Law. Her thesis was titled El tratamiento del derecho a la honra de acuerdo a la Constitución actual -2008-, por parte de los medios de prensa escrita sensacionalista. Caso Diario El Extra – sección Crónica Roja (The Treatment of the Right to Honor According to the Current Constitution -2008-, by the Sensationalist Written Media. El Extra Newspaper Case - Crónica Roja section).

In 2006, she entered the University of the Americas to study journalism and was granted a scholarship of academic excellence. She was host of the radio program La Hora Cero and a guest columnist for Diario La Verdad in Imbabura. She studied in the international program in Political Consultancy and Government Management at the San Francisco University of Quito.

She has a specialization in Government Management and Electoral Campaigns, as well as a Master's in Image Consulting and Political Consultancy from Camilo José Cela University.

== Political career ==
Aguirre became active in Ecuadorian politics in the National Assembly, where she served as rapporteur secretary and advisor to the Occasional Specialized Commission for the Treatment of the Constitutional Amendment and the Permanent Specialized Commission on Economic, Productive, and Microenterprise Development.

In 2016, she was the national spokesperson for the collective "Rafael Contigo Siempre", which collected 1.2 million signatures to request a referendum and allow the reelection of former Ecuadorian President Rafael Correa. Although they fulfilled their objective, the group gave up their initiative at the request of Correa himself, who declined a possible candidacy.

In August 2017, Aguirre was awarded as one of the 100 most influential political professionals, in the framework of the 2017 Napolitan Victory Awards.

In May 2018, she joined the Inter-American Platform of Women Leaders in Higher Education (Emulies).

=== Andean Parliament ===
Pamela Aguirre was elected to the Andean Parliament during the 2017 general election. She obtained a total of 2,669,238 votes nationwide. She was one of five elected and the other four were Hugo Quiroz, Rosa Cárdenas, Fausto Cobo and Patricia Terán.

In 2017, she held the body's vice-presidency of the Second Commission of Education, Culture, Science, Information Technology, and Communication. In addition, she was part of the Special Commission on Women and Gender Equity. During her first year in office she was the president of both commissions.

She has focused her work on four areas she proposed in her campaign, including the promotion of tourism through the recovery of the Inca road system and its declaration as Cultural Heritage by the Andean Community. In addition, she is committed to strengthening trade and promoting education, science, and technology, for which she has contributed to the construction of the University Accreditation Framework, which aims to validate degrees among member countries of the Andean region. Likewise, she has promoted an Ethical Pact against Tax Havens in order to combat tax evasion.

== Mutual death and reelection ==
The President of Ecuador Guillermo Lasso brought in an unusual constitution clause (number 148) known as Mutual death in May 2023 when he knew that he was about to be impeached. This required all of the National Assembly members to stand for re-election. Aguirre successfully won re-election taking more than 39%. She beat Fernando Jaramillo who had 18.95% and Lucía Posso who had 14.73%.

She was elected to the Commission on Biodiversity and Natural Resources which was led by the 20 year old Camila León. Other members were Jadira Del Rosario Bayas Uriarte, Sade Rashel Fritschi Naranjo, Esperanza Rogel and Katherine Alexandra Pacheco Machuca.
