= Politecnica Salesiana University =

University in Ecuador

Coordinates: 2.8864°S 78.9896°W

Salesian Polytechnic University
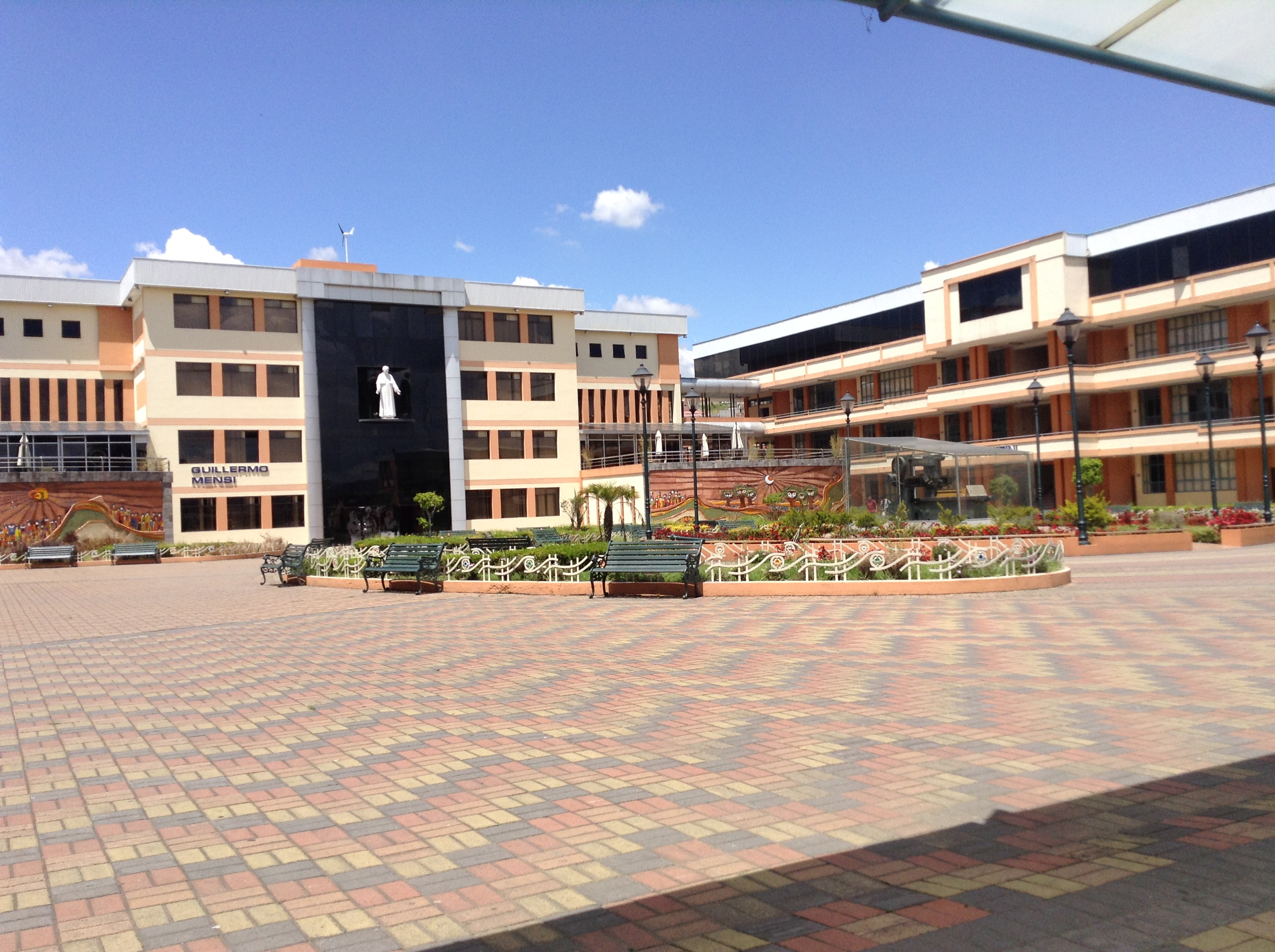
- Type: Private University
- Established: 1994; 32 years ago
- Rector: P. Javier Herran
- Undergraduates: 14,000
- Location: Cuenca, Guayaquil, Quito, Ecuador
- Website: www.ups.edu.ec

The Salesian Polytechnic University in Ecuador is an institution of higher education and Christian inspiration with Catholic character and a Salesian. The university is characterized by its opportunities for youth, especially from the poor sectors.

== History ==
In 1887 the Ecuador government signed an agreement with Don Bosco for the Salesians to take under their responsibility the 'Catholic Protectorate of Arts and Trades' in Quito. Ecuador was one of the first non-European countries to receive the children of the educator saint of Turin; the first was Argentina in 1877.

=== Foundation of the UPS ===
On August 5, 1994, the National Congress of Ecuador created the 'Politecnica Salesiana University', with its counterpart in the city of Cuenca, with headquarters in the cities of Quito and Guayaquil. Academic activities began in October of the same year.

=== 2011 Protest ===
In April 2011, according to Ecuador's "Hoy" news, about 150 indigenous protestors prevented people from coming and going from and to the campus for several hours. This was in protest to allegedly being scammed out of money in relation to land by the school's former rector.

== Alumni ==
Liliana Elizabeth Durán Aguilar studied here and became a member of Ecuador's National Assembly.

== Organization ==
The Politecnica Salesiana University has four faculties and one postgraduate unit on campuses in Cuenca (C), Guayaquil (G), and Quito (Q).

=== Faculties and unit ===
- Facultad de Ciencias Administrativas y Economicas
  - Administración de Empresas C, G, Q
  - Contabilidad y Auditoría C, G, Q
  - Gerencia y Liderazgo Q
- Facultad de Ciencias de Agropecuarias y Ambientales
- Facultad de Ciencias de Humanas y de la Educacion
  - Antropología Aplicada Q
  - Comunicación Social C, Q
  - Cultura Física C
  - Educación Intercultural Bilingüe Q
  - Filosofía y Pedagogía Q
  - Gestión para el Desarrollo Local Sostenible C, Q
  - Pedagogía C, Q
  - Psicología C, Q
  - Teología Pastoral Q
- Facultad de Ingenieras
- Unidad de Posgrados
  - Maestría en Educación con Mención en Gestión Educativa
  - Maestría en Administración de Empresas
  - Maestría en Antropología y Cultura
  - Maestría en Ciencias de la Computación
  - Maestría en Desarrollo Local con mención en Movimientos Sociales
  - Maestría en Diseño Curricular
  - Maestría en Educación Especial con mención en Educación de las Personas con Discapacidad Visual
  - Maestría en Gestión de Telecomunicaciones
  - Maestría en Intervención, Asesoría y Terapia Familiar Sistémica
  - Maestría en Métodos Numéricos para Diseño de Ingeniería
  - Maestría en Política Social de la Infancia y Adolescencia
  - Maestría en Sistemas Integrados de Gestión de la Calidad, Ambiente y Seguridad
  - Especialización en Educación a Distancia
  - Especialización en Gerencia de Empresas de Telecomunicaciones
  - Especialización en Métodos Numéricos
  - Especialista en Poder y Desarrollo Local
  - Diplomado Superior en Auditoría en Instituciones de Microfinanzas
  - Diplomado Superior en Docencia Universitaria
  - Diplomado Superior en Evaluación de la Educación Superior
  - Diplomado Superior en Gerencia de Marketing
  - Diplomado Superior en Gestión de Competencias

== Locations ==
- Rectorado: Avenida Turuhuayco 3-69 y Calle Vieja. Cuenca
- Sede Matriz Cuenca: Calle Vieja 12-30 y Elia Liut. Cuenca
- Sede Quito: Avenida 12 de Octubre N24-22 y Wilson. Quito
- Sede Guayaquil: Chambers 227 entre Robles y Laura Vicuña, Guayaquil
