= Assassination of Fernando Villavicencio =

2023 murder in Quito, Ecuador

- Part of the Ecuadorian security crisis
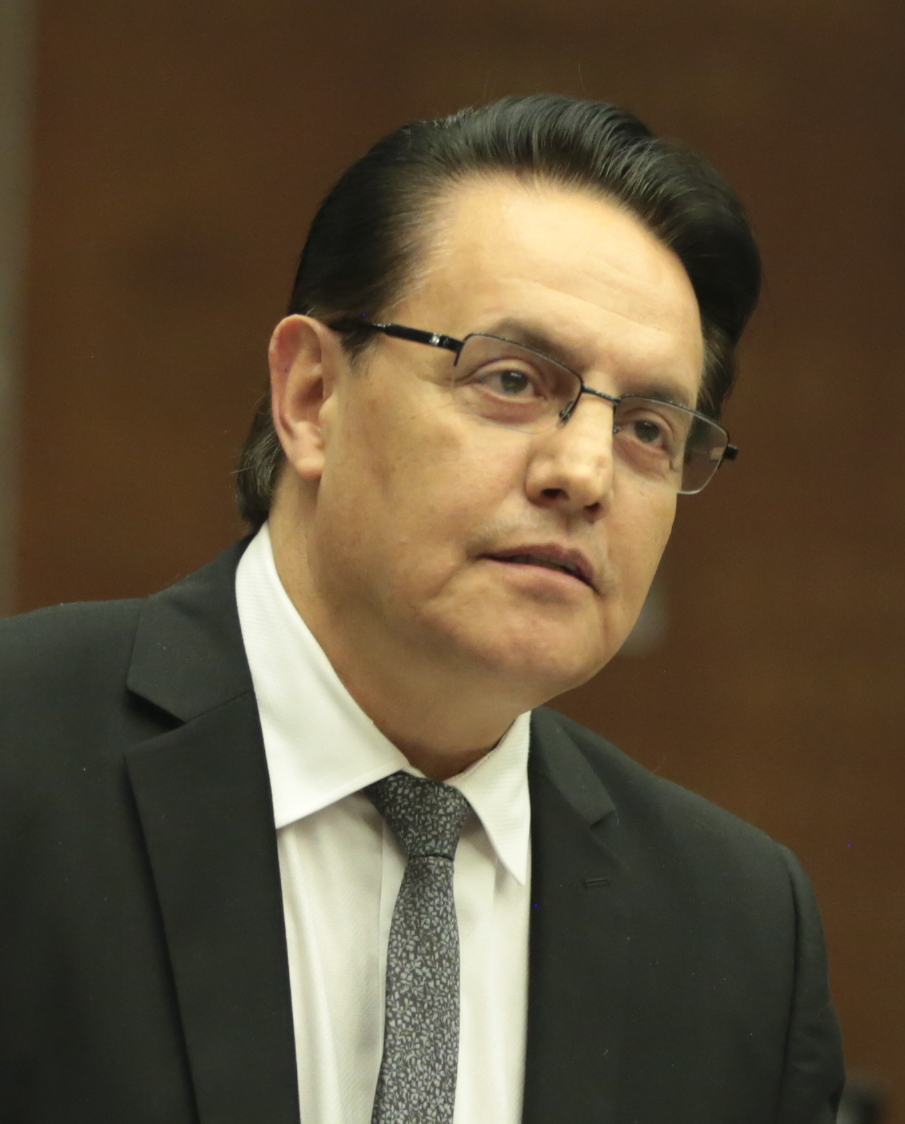
- Villavicencio in January 2023
- Location: 0°10′09″S 78°29′02″W; Colegio Anderson, Quito, Ecuador
- Date: 9 August 2023; 6:20 p.m. ET (UTC−05:00)
- Target: Fernando Villavicencio
- Attack type: Assassination
- Weapons: 9mm pistol, .223 rifle, submachine guns, grenades
- Deaths: 2 (Villavicencio and one suspect)
- Injuries: 9
- Perpetrators: Los Lobos (gang) Planning: Carlos Edwin Angulo Lara, Laura Castillo and three accomplices (Note: One deceased before trial, an additional detainee dismissed from trial) Material: Johan David Castillo López and six others (Note: All deceased before trial)
- Motive: Contract killing; mastermind motive unknown
- Accused: 6

On 9 August 2023, eleven days before the 2023 Ecuadorian general election, presidential candidate Fernando Villavicencio was assassinated after leaving a campaign rally in Quito, the capital of Ecuador. One assailant was killed during the attack. Several bystanders, including security personnel and a legislative candidate, were injured.

In November 2025, a prosecution witness stated that the murder was ordered by drug traficker Leandro Norero after journalist Christian Zurita supposedly solicited money from Norero to hide an investigation against him. According to the witness, Villavicencio continued publishing information about the case after the money was paid, so Norero ordered his killing.

== Background ==
Villavicencio was an Ecuadorian politician and a member of the National Assembly prior to its dissolution following president Guillermo Lasso's invocation of muerte cruzada. That constitutional provision triggered a general election, in which Villavicencio was a leading presidential candidate; at his highest level of support in late July, a La República poll found Villavicencio polling in second place with 13.2%, behind former assemblywoman Luisa González in first place with 26.6%, although polling a month later saw that number slightly reduced, putting him in third or fourth place. A day before his death, he made a report to the Ministry of Justice about an unnamed oil business. In September 2022, Villavicencio said he had been the target of an assassination attempt. Campaign advisor Patricio Zuquilanda also said that Villavicencio had received multiple death threats prior to the shooting, including one from the Sinaloa Cartel, that resulted in one arrest.

The Washington Post noted that his assassination occurred during a time of increasing gang violence in the country. A month prior to his assassination, Agustín Intriago, mayor of Manta, was also assassinated. Several local candidates had also been targeted by violent attacks in the run-up to the 2023 local elections: two of them, Julio César Farachio and Omar Menéndez, were killed between January and February of the same year.

== Assassination ==
On 9 August 2023, eleven days before the general election, Villavicencio spoke at a Movimiento Construye political rally at the Colegio Anderson in Quito. He concluded speaking at approximately 18:20 ET and left. While entering a white truck surrounded by guards, he was shot in the head three times. He was rushed to a nearby clinic where he was pronounced dead. Nine people were injured, including legislative candidate Gisella Molina and two police officers. One suspect in the assassination, Johan David Castillo, died from injuries sustained in a shootout. The attackers also threw a grenade towards Villavicencio's followers, but it did not explode. That same day, according to the party, armed men attacked Movimiento Construye's Quito offices.

Videos of the attack began circulating around social media shortly after Villavicencio's death was confirmed. The autopsy report gave his cause of death as cranial trauma, hemorrhaging and cerebral laceration; he also suffered a cranial fracture.

Villavicencio was the first Ecuadorian presidential candidate to be killed while campaigning since Abdón Calderón Muñoz in 1978.

== Suspects ==
In a video released on social media that evening, a criminal group known as Los Lobos allegedly claimed responsibility for the attack, but the authenticity of the video was questioned by NGOs that monitor the Ecuadorian criminal underworld. A second video emerged later, in which men purporting to be members of Los Lobos denied any involvement and said they were being framed.

Six arrests were made in the hours following the attack, with a number of firearms and grenades also seized. Interior Minister Juan Zapata Silva gave the detainees' names at a press conference, and police sources subsequently identified them as Colombian hitmen, including the dead assailant, who was identified as Johan David Castillo López. The six surviving suspects had been arrested on other charges a month earlier but had been released on bail; however, because of their failure to report to the police as required by their bail conditions, warrants for their arrest were issued in the afternoon of 9 August, two hours before the attack on Villavicencio. On 8 September, six additional suspects were detained in police raids in Quito and Latacunga. One of those suspects, Laura Dayanara Castillo Velin, a gang leader of Los Lobos in the south of Quito, was being previously investigated by the police for arms trafficking and in June was detained alongside Castillo López in Guayllabamba but both were released.

On 6 October, six suspects were killed in the Litoral Penitentiary in Guayaquil, followed by another suspect inside a Quito prison the following day. In response, the Ecuadorean government ordered the transfer of the rest of the suspects to other prisons.

On 27 February 2024, attorney Ana Hidalgo revealed during the preparatory hearing that the orders of the assassination were given by Los Lobos leader Carlos Edwin Angulo Lara, alias Invisible, from the Latacunga Penitentiary. Angulo Lara was serving a four-year sentence for arms and drug trafficking. According to the attorney, Angulo Lara exchanged conversations with Castillo López and Castillo Velin and the latter provided the hitmen and the other accomplices with weapons, transportation and logistics of the rally. On the day of the assassination, Angulo Lara messaged Castillo López saying "When you see (him), hit it. I trust you, do it".

On 12 July 2024, a court in Quito sentenced Carlos Angulo, the alleged leader of the Los Lobos gang, and Laura Castillo to 34 years' imprisonment for ordering the assassination. Three other accomplices were also sentenced to 12 years' imprisonment. While the General Attorney successfully determined the timelime of the assassination, they haven't concluded who were the masterminds or motives behind it.

On 3 September 2025, prosecutors charged former minister Jose Serrano, former lawmaker Ronny Aleaga and businessman Xavier Jordan as "intellectual authors" of the assassination.

In November 2025, Marcelo Lazo, a prosecution witness who shared a cell with drug trafficker Leandro Norero, stated in pretrial testimony that the murder occurred after journalist Christian Zurita, a close friend of Villavicencio, allegedly solicited US$200,000 from Norero through a third party in exchange for not publishing information about an investigation against him. According to the testimony, Norero paid this money, but Villavicencio continued publishing information about the investigation, so his assassination was ordered.

In March 2026, Ángel Esteban Aguilar Morales aka Lobo Menor, a suspected leader of Los Lobos accused of logistical and operational involvement in the assassination, was arrested in Mexico and extradited to Colombia, where he is also wanted on charges of involvement with FARC dissidents.

== Aftermath ==
The assassination was seen to have caused "chaos" in the country, most of it caused by drug gangs.

On 11 August, a public memorial for Villavicencio was held at a convention center in Quito followed by a private funeral for relatives and associates.

On 21 August, one day after the elections, "Gente Buena", one of the movements that co-sponsored Villavicencio's candidacy, broke ties with Movimiento Construye, citing disagreements about their leadership and assembly conformation. MC-25 announced that one of their first actions in the National Assembly would be the creation of a special commission to investigate Villavicencio's death.

On 27 September, Zurita denounced that an individual was detained by the police, with the intentions of an attack to Villavicencio's widow Verónica Sarauz, according to the police, the suspect was detained for an illegal possession of a firearm, mentioning it was an "isolated procedure".

On April 8, 2025, Villavicencio's widow, Verónica Sarauz, denounced, through her X account, that the investigation process proposed by the Ecuadorian Attorney General's Office, in charge of Diana Salazar Méndez, is tainted by political and drug trafficking interests, and even that the Prosecutor herself and President Daniel Noboa could be involved in concealing information about Fernando's murder.

=== Government response ===
President Guillermo Lasso, who first confirmed the assassination, wrote that he was "outraged and shocked" on Twitter. Lasso convened a Security Cabinet meeting at the Palacio de Carondelet that evening, attended by attorney general Diana Salazar Méndez and the presidents of the National Electoral Council and National Court of Justice. In a televised address to the nation shortly after midnight, Lasso announced three days of national mourning and the imposition of a state of emergency across the country for the following 60 days, entailing the deployment of the military to support the work of the police and the suspension of a number of civil liberties, such as freedom of assembly and the inviolability of the home. He also confirmed that the election would take place as scheduled on 20 August.

=== Impact on the election ===
Diana Atamaint, the president of the National Electoral Council (CNE), said that since the ballot papers had already been printed, Villavicencio's name and photograph would still appear on them on election day and votes cast for him would be counted towards any substitute candidate nominated by Movimiento Construye (MC-25). On 11 August, MC-25 sent the CNE a series of questions to clarify the legal situation regarding his replacement. Some constitutional experts said that Andrea González, Villavicencio's running mate and the party's preferred choice, would be ineligible because she was already registered as a vice-presidential candidate and, once registered, "candidacies were non-renounceable".

On 12 August, MC-25 announced González as its replacement presidential candidate, with her running mate to be announced "in the coming hours"; however, because of the legal uncertainties regarding her eligibility and the absence of a response from the CNE to their queries, on 13 August they backtracked on that decision and nominated the journalist Christian Zurita instead, with González as his running mate.

Movimiento Construye also requested the postponing of the 13 August televised debate, which all the presidential hopefuls were required to attend. Rival candidate Otto Sonnenholzner joined the call for its postponement, but the CNE insisted it go ahead as planned. MC-25 was ineligible to participate, because the CNE had not yet ratified their replacement candidate.

On 20 August, election day, Zurita, González and Villavicencio's family voted under heavy security measures. All the other presidential candidates also had their security increased during the voting. With over 16% of the vote, MC-25 obtained third place in the presidential race, which some media outlets described as a "condolence vote". Molina, who suffered a minor eye injury in the shootout, was also reelected in the National Assembly.

=== Other reactions ===
Other candidates called for a tougher stance on crime, including Yaku Pérez Guartambel, Xavier Hervas, Jan Topić, Otto Sonnenholzner, and Luisa González. Pérez, González, Topić, and Bolívar Armijos announced the suspension of their respective electoral campaigns out of respect. Former president Rafael Correa remarked on his killing that Ecuador had become a "failed state" and warned that "those who try to sow more hate" with his death "will only continue to destroy us".

The electoral observation mission of the Organization of American States (OAS), due to start arriving in the country the day after the assassination, shared the grief and consternation of the Ecuadorian people and called on the authorities to conduct a thorough and comprehensive investigation. U.S. ambassador to Ecuador Michael J. Fitzpatrick said his country condemned the attack. The governments of Argentina, Brazil, Chile, Peru, Spain, and the United Kingdom expressed their condolences.

== See also ==
- Crime in Ecuador
