= Ibeth Estupiñán =

Ecuadorian politician (born 1982)

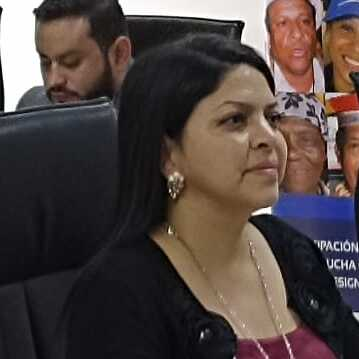
- at the CPCCS in 2022
- Born: c.1982
- Known for: member of the Council for Citizen Participation and Social Control

Ibeth Estupiñán or Graciela Ibeth Estupiñán Gómez (born c. 1982) is an Ecuadorian politician who is elected to the Council for Citizen Participation and Social Control.

== Life ==
Estupiñán was born in about 1982. She took her first masters degree while serving in the administration of the Mayor of Quito, Jorge Yunda, before going to work at the offices of the Council for Citizen Participation and Social Control. She was promoted to be a senior advisor.

She stood to be elected to the CCPCS with a manifesto that mentioned that she had the inside knowledge to know how it should be transformed. She actually joined the council after José Tuárez, Rosa Chalá, Walter Gómez and Victoria Desintonio were impeached in July 2019 and they were replaced by their substitutes which included Estupiñán.

In February 2022 Hernán Ulloa replaced Sofia Almeida as President of the CCPCS after the new council decided that they preferred Ulloa was President. The other members were David Rosero, Javier Dávalos, María Fernanda Rivadeneira, Francisco Bravo and Estupiñán. It was believed that she held the balance of power between two factions within the council. She has been asked to explain her decisions and whether she was under the influence of the President of Ecuador.
