= Cedillo (surname) =

Cedillo is a surname. Notable people with the surname include:

- Ángel Cedillo Hernández (born 1960), Mexican politician
- Enrique Cedillo (born 1996), Mexican professional footballer
- Gil Cedillo (born 1954), American politician
- Jaime Serrano Cedillo (1967–2012), deputy of Nezahualcóyotl, Mexico
- Julio Cesar Cedillo (born 1970), Mexican-American actor
- María Marcos Cedillo Salas, Mexican pilot
- Mónica Banegas Cedillo (born 1977), Ecuadorian politician
- Saturnino Cedillo (1890–1939), Mexican politician

== Places ==
- Cedillo, town and municipality in the province of Cáceres, community of Extremadura, Spain
- Cedillo de la Torre, municipality in the province of Segovia, Castile and León, Spain
- Cedillo del Condado, municipality in the province of Toledo, Castile-La Mancha, Spain

== See also ==
- Sedillo (disambiguation)
- Cedillo v. Secretary of Health and Human Services, lawsuit
