= Pooler (surname) =

Pooler is a surname. Notable people with the surname include:

- Frank Pooler (Wisconsin politician) (1847–1900), American businessman and politician
- Frank Pooler (1926–2013), American choirmaster
- Lewis Pooler (1858–1924), Anglican priest
- Marie Pooler (1928-2013), American composer
- Lolita Huning Pooler (1889–1966), American educator, folklorist
- Rosemary S. Pooler (born 1938), American judge
