= Abdón Calderón Muñoz =

Ecuadorian politician (1924–1978)

- Born: 20 January 1924; Milagro, Ecuador
- Died: 9 December 1978 (aged 54); Miami, Florida, U.S.
- Occupations: Economist, politician
- Years active: 1961–1978
- Political party: Alfarista Radical Front

Abdón Calderón Muñoz (20 January 1924 – 9 December 1978) was an Ecuadorian politician and economist. He was the founder of the Alfarista Radical Front. He was a candidate for president of Ecuador in the 1978 general election shortly before his assassination.

== Life ==
Calderón Muñoz was born in Milagro, Ecuador. He was married to Rosita Prieto and had four children. Calderón Muñoz spent most of his career in Guayaquil.

In 1961, Calderón Muñoz was elected to the council of the Guayaquil Canton and was elected council president in 1962. In 1970s, he was a critic of the dictatorship of Guillermo Rodríguez during the Supreme Council of Government.

== Death ==
On 29 November 1978, Calderón Muñoz was shot several times at his home in Guayaquil. The culprits were two hitmen, with one of them being identified as Guillermo "Plin" Mendez. While he survived the attack, he was transported to the United States in Miami, Florida to treat his injuries; however he died from complications of his injuries on 9 December 1978, aged 54. He would be the last presidential candidate to be assassinated until Fernando Villavicencio's assassination in 2023.
