= Walter Gómez Ronquillo =

Ecuadorian politician and LGBT activist (born 1970)

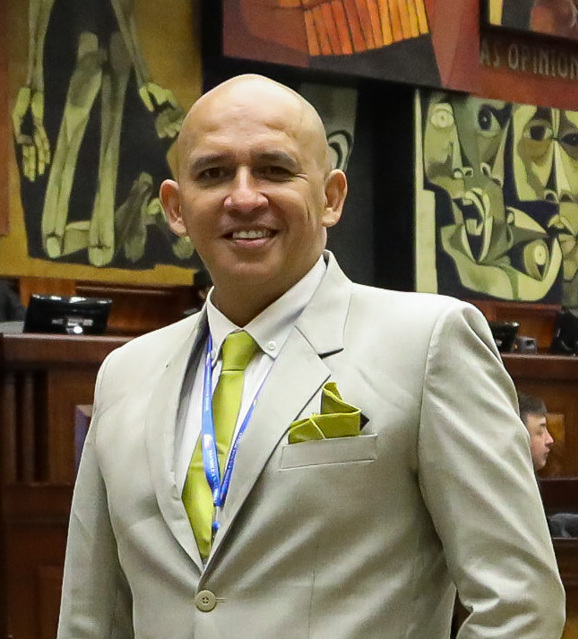
- Gómez in 2022
- Born: June 9, 1970 (age 56); Guayaquil, Ecuador
- Education: University of Guayaquil
- Occupations: LGBTQ activist; politician

Walter Javier Gómez Ronquillo (born June 9, 1970 in Guayaquil, Ecuador) is an Ecuadorian politician and LGBTQ activist. He has worked for more than 25 years defending the rights of the country's LGBTQ populations and served as director of the Vida Libre Foundation for 13 years. He has also been a national assemblyman and councilor for Citizen Participation and Social Control.

== Biography ==
Gómez was born on June 9, 1970 in Guayaquil, Guayas province. He completed his secondary studies at the Clemente Yerovi Indaburu National School and higher education at the University of Guayaquil, where he obtained a bachelor's degree in marketing and advertising. He later earned his master's degree at the same university in international sciences and diplomacy.

He entered the public sector in 2017 after being appointed provincial delegate of the Council for Citizen Participation and Social Control in Guayas. He later won a merit and recognition contest to join the Gender Equality Council on behalf of LGBTQ people.

=== CPCCS Advisor ===
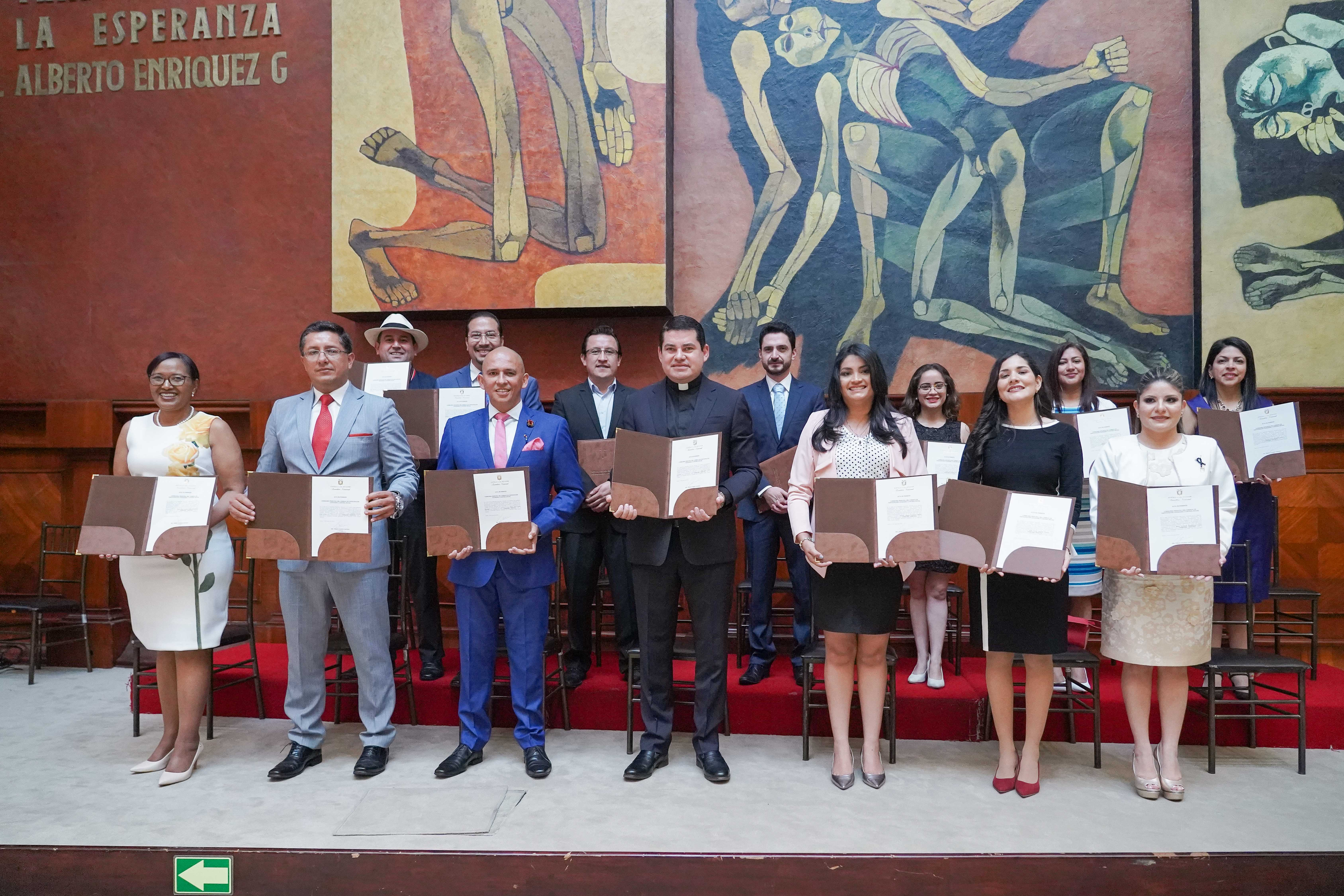
Walter Gómez being sworn in to the Council for Citizen Participation and Social Control (June 13, 2019)

For the 2019 elections, Gómez presented himself as a candidate for the Council for Citizen Participation and Social Control (CPCCS) and received the support of former President Rafael Correa. Among his proposals were the rejection of the privatization of public companies and the review of the actions of the previous Citizen Participation Council. Gómez was elected to the Council and took office on June 13 of the same year. Alongside councilors Victoria Desintonio and Rosa Chalá, he supported the election of José Tuárez as president of the Council of Citizen Participation.

As a member of the CPCCS, he participated in the 2019 Guayaquil LGBTQ Pride March, an event that he had attended annually since its first editions.

During his first months in the position, he announced his intention to support the review of what was done by the Transitional Citizen Participation Council. However, the National Assembly initiated a political trial process against the councilors who supported this initiative, including Gómez, for allegedly going against an opinion of the Constitutional Court that stated that the actions of the Transitional Council could not be reviewed. The impeachment trial took place on August 14, 2019. During his defense, Gómez described the Assembly's accusations as "ridiculous and impertinent" and urged the assembly members to work for the country. The Assembly finally censored Gómez and the rest of the defendants with 84 votes in favor, and they were dismissed from their positions.

=== Later political life ===
Gómez re-entered politics in 2021 and was elected alternate national assemblyman (of Alexandra Arce) by the Union for Hope coalition in the legislative elections of that year. During the election campaign, Gómez publicly committed to defending the rights of LGBTQ people from the Assembly. On September 12, 2022, he assumed the position of principal assemblyman, after the departure of the legislature of Alexandra Arce, who resigned from the Assembly to participate in the following year's sectional elections.
