= Esthela Acero =

Ecuadorian politician

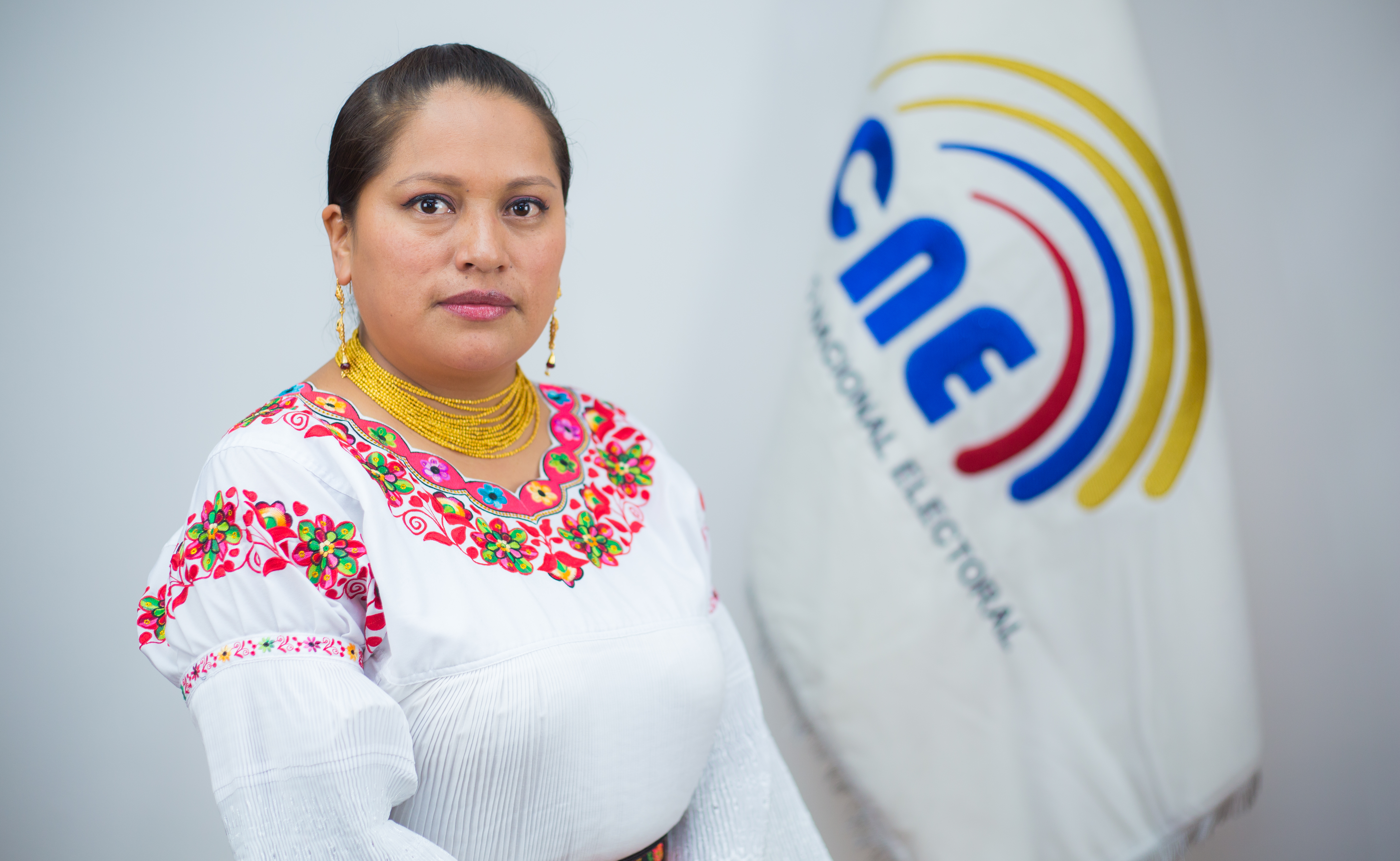
- Born: December 22, 1984 (age 41); Cangahua
- Occupation: politician
- Known for: member of the Consejo Nacional Electoral (Ecuador) (National Electoral Council)
- Political party: Alianza País

Esthela Acero Lanchimba (born December 22, 1984) is an Ecuadorian politician. She was chosen to serve on the Consejo Nacional Electoral (Ecuador) (National Electoral Council) in 2018 for six years.

== Life ==
Acero was born in Cangahua in Cayambe Canton in 1984.

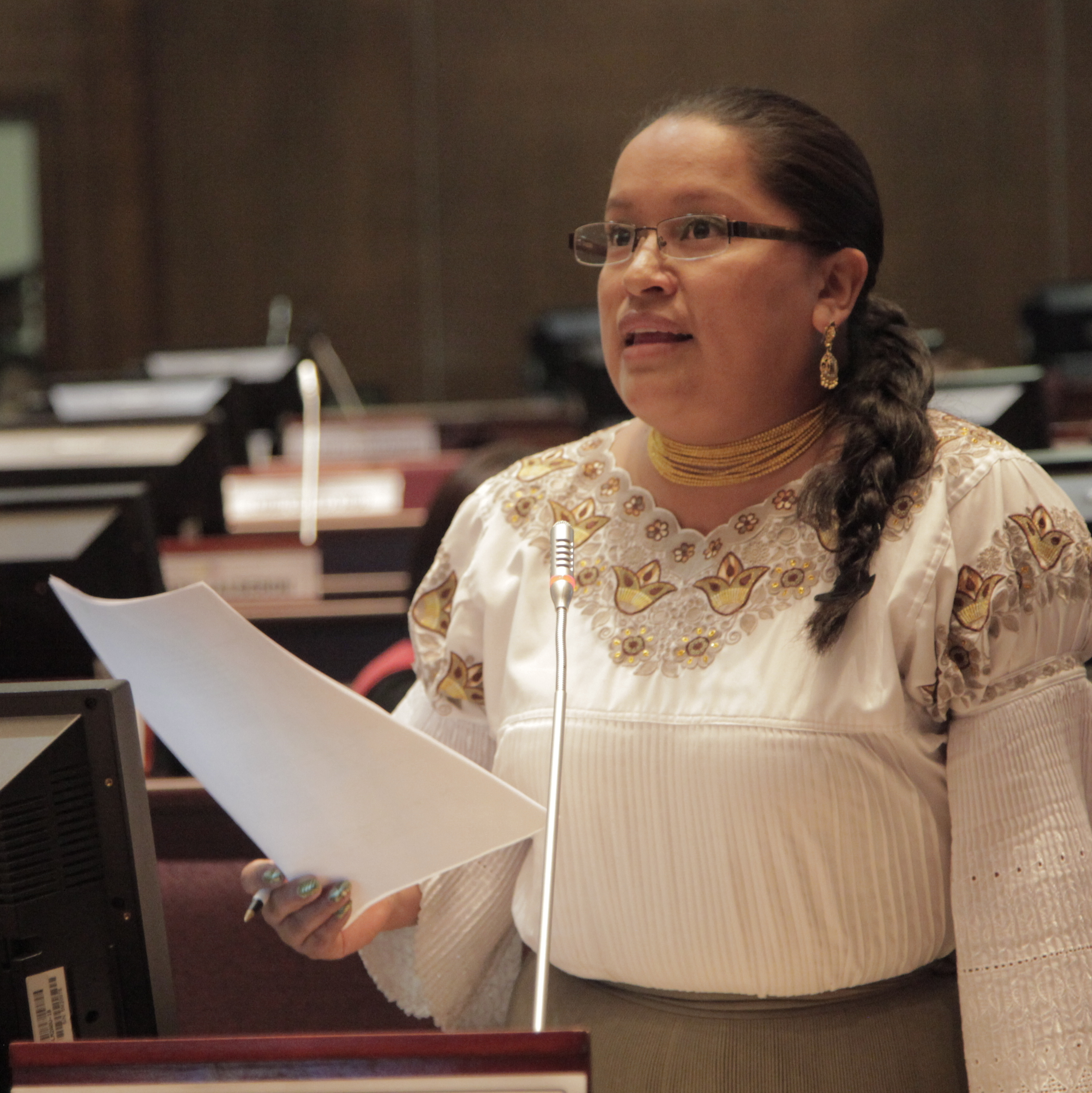
Esthela Acero Lanchimba at the National Assembly in 2015

Acero was chosen as one of the members of the Consejo Nacional Electoral (Ecuador) (National Electoral Council) by the Council for Citizen Participation and Social Control who agreed the make up after it was agreed by five of their seven members. The new members will serve for the next six years. Acero was proposed by Alianza País. The others were proposed by other leading parties. Enrique Pita, for Creo; Diana Atamaint is proposed by the Confederation of Indigenous Peoples and Nationalities ( Conaie ), José Cabrera, for the Social Christian Party ( PSC ) and the Guayaquil Civic Board's candidate was Luis Verdesoto.

On 20 November 2018 Diana Atamaint became president of the National Electoral Council after an internal election. There were five members of the council and two of them, Enrique Pita and José Cabrera, supported her election while the other two, Luis Verdezoto and Acero did not.

In July 2022 she was impeached due to allegations that the National Electoral Council had failed to investigate irregularities in the 2021 general election. Charges were made against her and Diana Atamaint, Enrique Pita, José Cabrera and Luis Verdesoto (even though he was no longer a councillor). Joel Abad and Mario Ruiz Jácome alleged that the council had not investigated inconsistencies in 39,000 ballot boxes. There were doubts as to whether the National Assembly's Oversight Commission were allowed to impeach the council. On 12 July a proposal to halt the impeachment process made by Ana Belén Cordero was accepted by the commission.
