= Christian Zurita =

Ecuadorian journalist and politician

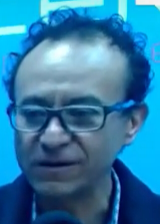
- Born: Christian Gustavo Zurita Ron; 4 April 1970 (age 56); Quito, Ecuador
- Education: Central University of Ecuador
- Occupations: Journalist, politician
- Political party: Movimiento Construye

Christian Gustavo Zurita Ron (born 4 April 1970) is an Ecuadorian journalist and politician who was a candidate for president of Ecuador in the 2023 general election. He was selected as Fernando Villavicencio's replacement on the Movimiento Construye ticket following his assassination. Prior to his presidential candidacy, he was an investigative journalist based in Quito.

== Biography ==
Zurita was born in Quito, Ecuador. He graduated from the Central University of Ecuador with a degree in Social Communications.

=== Professional career ===
He was a correspondent for Vistazo magazine from 1993 to 2000. Subsequently, between 2002 and 2008, he served as the head of the Investigation Unit of the 24 Horas news program on Teleamazonas.

In 2008, he took over leadership of investigative reporting at the Expreso newspaper, where he held the position of investigative editor until 2011. In that same year, he joined the team at El Universo newspaper as an investigator and special writer, focusing his work on issues related to corruption, organized crime, and drug trafficking.

In 2010, he published the book "El gran hermano: historia de una simulación" (The Big Brother: Story of a Simulation) together with Juan Carlos Calderón Vivanco, where they exposed cases of favoritism in state contracts by Fabricio Correa, brother of former president Rafael Correa. This led to both journalists being sued and sentenced in 2012 to pay one million dollars each for moral damages. However, Correa eventually dropped the case, avoiding the economic punishment of both journalists.

In 2015, he founded the website Milhojas.is.

In 2019, he co-authored the book "Arroz verde: la industria del soborno" (Green Rice: The Bribery Industry) with Fernando Villavicencio. The book exposes reports on the management of bribes and the accounting of bribes by officials and members of the party of former president Rafael Correa. Additionally, in that same year, he founded the website periodismodeinvestigacion.com, where he serves as editor.

Zurita worked with Fernando Villavicencio as an investigative journalist who focused on the corruption of the Ecuadorian government during the presidency of Rafael Correa.

== Political career ==
2023 presidential campaign

On 9 August 2023, Zurita was present when Fernando Villavicencio was assassinated in Quito. He was one of the first officials to confirm Villavicencio's death.

Following the assassination, Movimiento Construye was tasked to name Villavicencio's replacement. The party initially selected Andrea González, Villavicencio's vice-presidential running mate, to replace him. However, due to uncertainties regarding the legality of that decision, Zurita was selected instead on 13 August.

Since Zurita was unable to file his candidacy prior to a deadline set National Electoral Council (CNE), he was not eligible to participate in the only debate in the election. His campaign focused on anti-corruption and anti-violence. He did not make it to the second round of the election.

== Publications ==
- El Gran Hermano, historia de una simulación (2010)
- El discreto encanto de la Revolución Ciudadana (2010)
- Arroz verde: la industria del soborno (2019)

== Recognitions ==
- National Journalism Award(Premio Nacional de Periodismo): 2009 and 2019.
- Jorge Mantilla Ortega Journalism Award (Premio de Periodismo Jorge Mantilla Ortega): 2010 and 2019 (with Fernando Villavicencio and Cristina Solórzano).
- SIP Data Journalism Award: 2018 (with the Investiga LavaJato collective): .
