= Sedillo =

Sedillo may refer to:

- Sedillo, New Mexico, a census-designated place in Bernalillo County, New Mexico, United States
- Antoinette Sedillo Lopez (born 1956/1957), American politician
- James Sedillo, American politician
- Matt Sedillo (born 1981), American political poet, essayist, and activist
- Mela Sedillo (1903-1989), American folklorist, educator

== See also ==
- Cedillo (surname)
