= Movimiento Construye =

Movimiento Construye Movimiento Construye
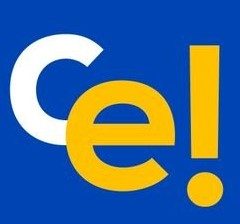
- Abbreviation: MC25
- Leader: María Paula Romo
- Secretary-General: Iván González Váscone
- Founded: 12 September 2004 (as Ruptura 25)
- Dissolved: 26 April 2026
- Headquarters: Quito, Ecuador
- Membership: 171,644 (2012)
- Ideology: Neoliberalism
- Political position: Big tent
- Colours: White; Blue; Yellow
- Slogan: It's Time to Build!
- Seats in the National Assembly: 1 / 151
- Prefects: 0 / 23
- Mayors: 11 / 221

Website
- https://www.construye.ec/

The Movimiento Construye (MC25), also known simply as Construye, was an Ecuadorian political party founded in 2004. It was originally founded under the name Ruptura 25 (R25). The party joined an alliance with the Democratic Left in 2016. This lasted until 2018 because of disagreements with President Lenín Moreno.

In the 2023 general election, the party was represented by Fernando Villavicencio until his assassination in August 2023. The party initially selected Andrea González, his vice-presidential running mate, to replace him, but because of uncertainties regarding the legality of that decision, subsequently chose the journalist Christian Zurita instead.

On 26 April 2026, the National Electoral Council plenary session eliminated the legal status of the Movimiento Construye, for not having the number of adherents required for the functioning of political organizations, as stipulated by the electoral law.

Original Logo as Ruptura 25 (R25)

== Electoral results ==
=== National Assembly elections ===
Election	Leader	Votes	%	Seats	+/–
2013	Paco Moncayo	2,179,383	2.48	0 / 137	0
2017	Did not participate			0 / 137	0
2021	Andrés Briones	57,711	0.72	1 / 137	▲1
2023	Patricio Carrillo	1,707,682	20.39	24 / 137	▲23
2025	María Paula Romo	–	–	1 / 137	▼23
