= Gomez House =

Gomez House or Gomez Residencia may refer to:

- Schwalen-Gomez House, Tucson, Arizona, listed on the NRHP in Pima County, Arizona
- Refugio Gomez House, Albuquerque, New Mexico, listed on the NRHP in Bernalillo County, New Mexico
- Gómez Residence, Mayagüez, Puerto Rico
