= Diana Atamaint =

Ecuadorian Shuar politician

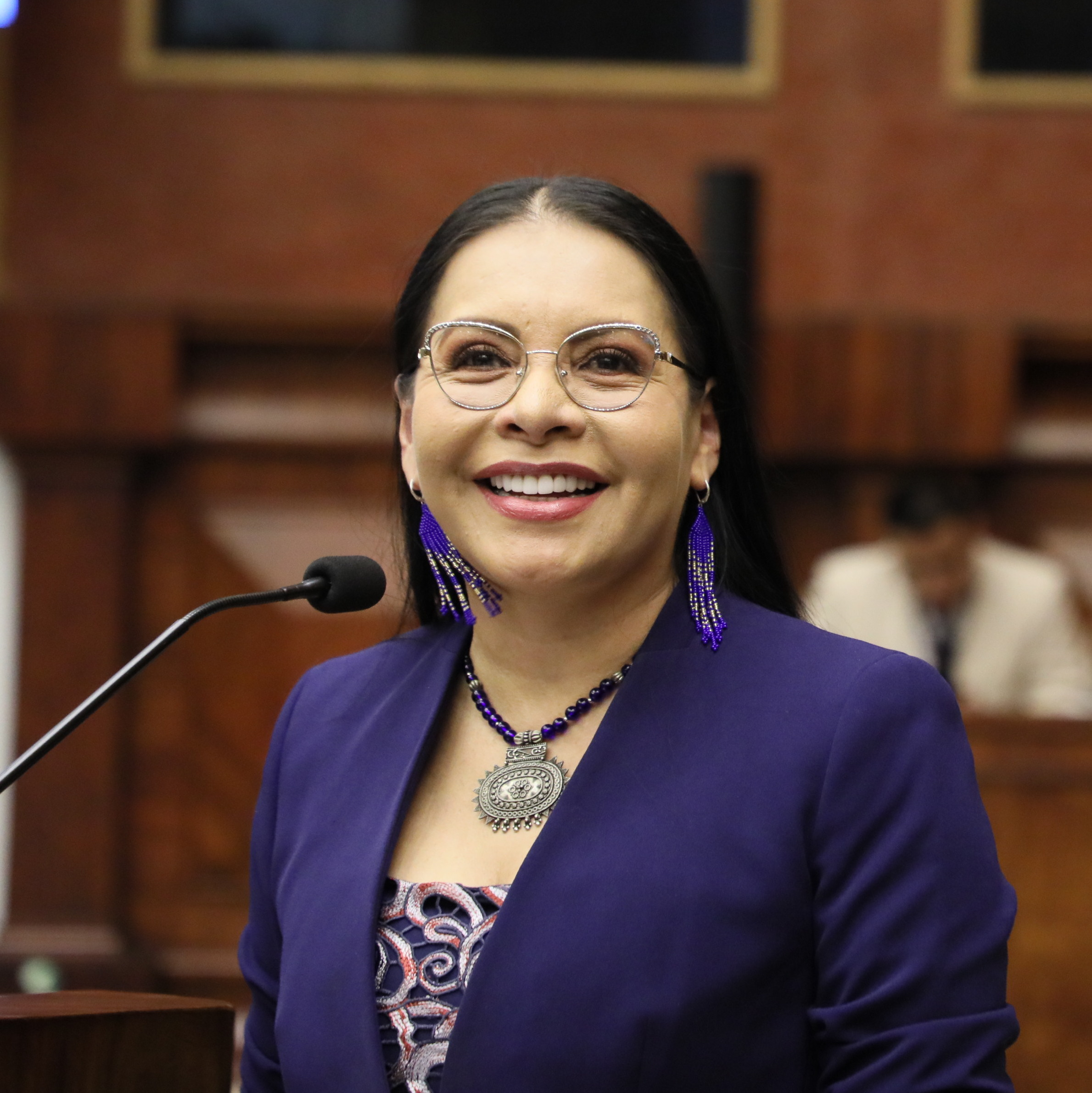
- in 2026

President of the National Electoral Council
- Incumbent
- Assumed office 20 November 2018

Member of the National Assembly
- In office 31 July 2009 – 9 May 2013
- Constituency: Morona Santiago

Member of the National Congress
- In office 5 January 2007 – 30 November 2007
- Constituency: Morona Santiago

Personal details
- Born: 12 May 1972 (age 54) Sucúa, Ecuador
- Party: Pachakutik Plurinational Unity Movement (until 2017)
- Education: University of Cuenca; Latin American Faculty of Social Sciences

Shiram Diana Atamaint Wamputsar (born 12 May 1972) is an Ecuadorian Shuar politician. Previously a member of the National Assembly, in 2018 she became the president of the National Electoral Council. She declared that President Daniel Noboa had won another term as President in April 2025.

== Early life and career ==
Atamaint was born in Sucúa, in the province of Morona Santiago, in 1972. She was the first of four children born to Bosco Atamaint and Aurora Wamputsar. both of whom were teachers. She attended Río Upano School before she studied for a degree in commercial engineering at the University of Cuenca, where she graduated in 2003. She went on to gain a master's degree at the Latin American Faculty of Social Sciences (FLACSO).

At the age of 26, she began to work for a Project for the Development of the Indigenous and Black Peoples of Ecuador, funded by the World Bank. She visited communities in the provinces of Morona Santiago, Pastaza and Zamora Chinchipe, and she decided to be a politician.

== Political career ==
She entered politics in 2003 as alternate deputy for Sandra Palacios. In the 2006 legislative elections, she was elected as a deputy of her home province of Morona Santiago as a Pachakutik Plurinational Unity Movement candidate. She joined the Ministry of Agriculture as the Undersecretary for the Amazon. She had become the first legislator of the Shuar people. She was unusual for being qualified technically and she had to persuade the voters that they could support a woman to take the role. During her time in the National Assembly, on several occasions Atamaint wore the traditional dress of the Shuar community.

In 2009, she was appointed undersecretary for the Amazon at the Ministry of Agriculture, but she resigned to participate as a candidate for assembly member in the legislative elections of the same year. She won a seat representing Morona Santiago for Pachakutik.

During the protests of the Shuar community at the end of 2009, she participated as a representative of the protesters in the dialogues with the central government.

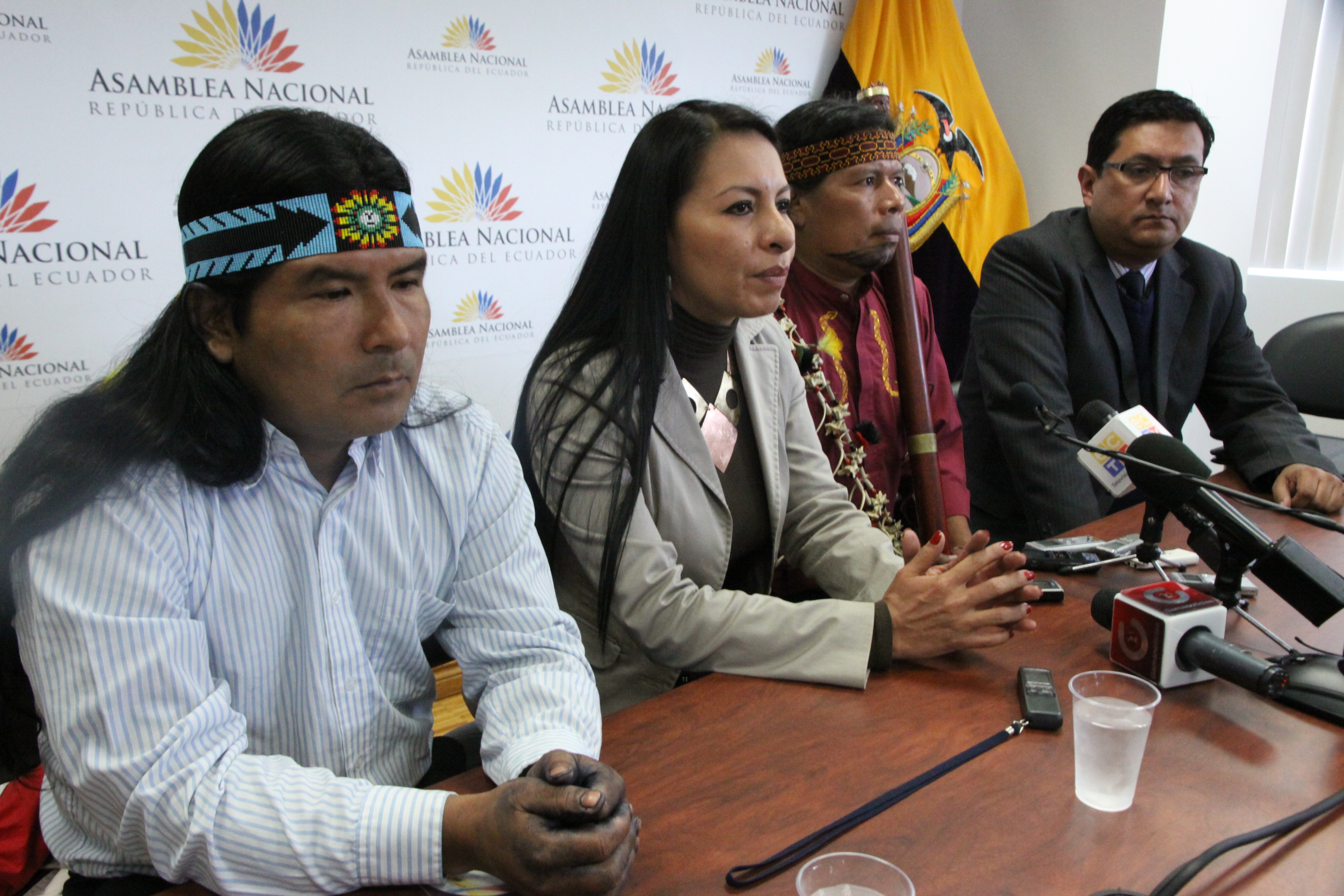
Assemblywoman Diana Atamaint with Indigenous Leaders at a press conference in 2012

In June 2012, the environment minister, Marcela Aguiñaga, tried to sue Atamaint for slander after the she said in an interview that the minister had diverted public funds to friends' accounts. The National Court of Justice asked the National Assembly to lift Atamaint's parliamentary immunity, but it rejected the request. The motion to deny the request was presented by Paco Moncayo and obtained 66 votes in favor, 36 against and 11 abstentions.

In 2013 she stood again for election with Francisco Eduardo Cedeno Miranda as her alternate.

On 20 November 2018 Atamaint became president of the National Electoral Council (CNE). There were five members of the council and two of them, Enrique Pita and José Cabrera, supported her election while the other two, Luis Verdezoto and Esthela Acero, did not.

In February 2019 Marlon Santi, coordinator of Pachakutik, distanced himself and his party from Atamaint as they did not agree with her policies as president of the National Electoral Council.

During the 2022 Ecuadorian protests, talks broke down between the Government of Guillermo Lasso and Confederation of Indigenous Nationalities of Ecuador's leader Leonidas Iza after the president said that talks were off. The president held meetings with Iza and others with mediation from church leaders and other political leaders despite an attack on a military convoy in Orellana province. Atamaint (as president of the National Electoral Council), the National Assembly President Virgilio Saquicela and César Córdova of the CPCCS all called on the president for calm and to continue talks. Atamaint was clear that there were long standing demands that had to be resolved. She conceded that there had been violence during the recent national strike but she believed this was due to "private interests".

In July 2022, Atamaint was being impeached as it was alleged that the National Electoral Council had failed to investigate irregularities in the February 2021 general election. Charges were made against her and Esthela Acero, Enrique Pita, José Cabrera and Luis Verdesoto (even though he was no longer a councillor). Joel Abad and Mario Ruiz Jácome alleged that the council had not investigated inconsistencies in 39,000 ballot boxes. There were doubts as to whether the National Assembly's Oversight Commission were allowed to impeach the council. On 12 July a proposal to halt the impeachment process, made by Ana Belén Cordero, was accepted by the commission.

In August 2023, Atamaint reported that thousands of votes had been lost by mainly European voters due to cyber attacks in the 2023 general election. The attacks came from several different countries.

On 13 April 2025, Atamaint announced the result of the national presidential election. 90% of the results had been counted and as the President of the National Election Council she declared that President Daniel Noboa had secured another election victory.

== Personal life ==
She is divorced and has two children.
