= Adrian Barela House =

Historic house in New Mexico, United States

- U.S. National Register of Historic Places
- NM State Register of Cultural Properties
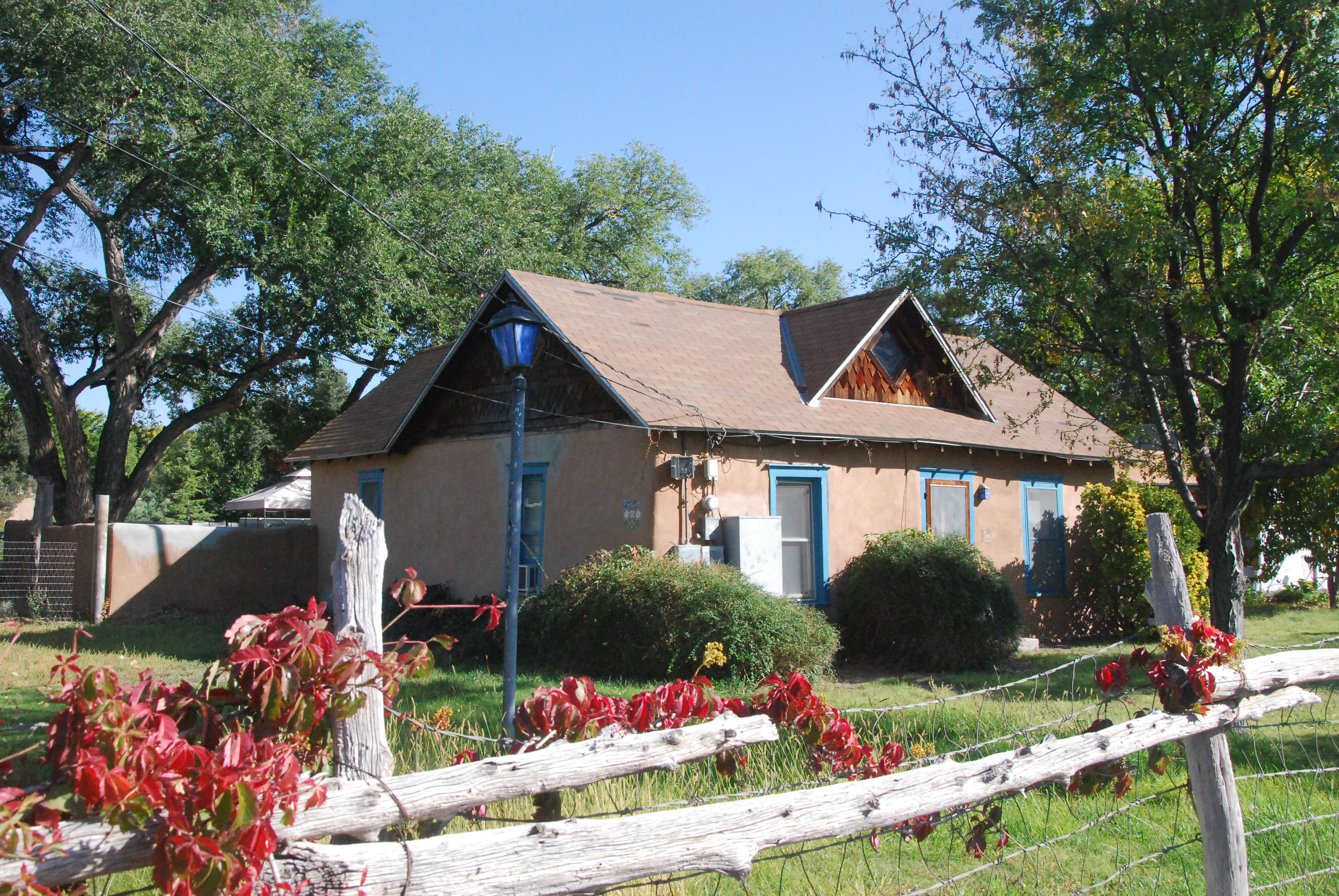
- The house in 2020

- Location within New Mexico Location within the United States
- Location: 7618 Guadalupe Trail NW, Los Ranchos de Albuquerque, New Mexico
- Coordinates: 35°10′15″N 106°38′24″W
- Built: c. 1900
- Architectural style: New Mexico Vernacular
- NRHP reference No.: 84002843
- NMSRCP No.: 940

Significant dates
- Added to NRHP: February 9, 1984
- Designated NMSRCP: August 25, 1983

The Adrian Barela House is a historic house in Los Ranchos de Albuquerque, New Mexico. It was built around 1900, probably by Adrian Barela and his wife Jesusita Tenorio, who lived there until the early 1930s. The building was added to the New Mexico State Register of Cultural Properties in 1983 and the National Register of Historic Places in 1984. It is located on the same block as another historic property, the Refugio Gomez House.

The house is an example of New Mexico vernacular architecture, with stuccoed adobe walls and simple wooden trim. The roof was originally flat but was replaced with a pitched roof with intersecting gables soon after the house was built. The gables are decorated with diamond-shaped wooden shingles and diamond-shaped windows. The house was originally L-shaped, but is now rectangular after a kitchen was added in the mid-20th century. It has original 1-over-1 wood-framed sash windows and an off-center front entrance.
