= Sofía Almeida =

Ecuadorian politician

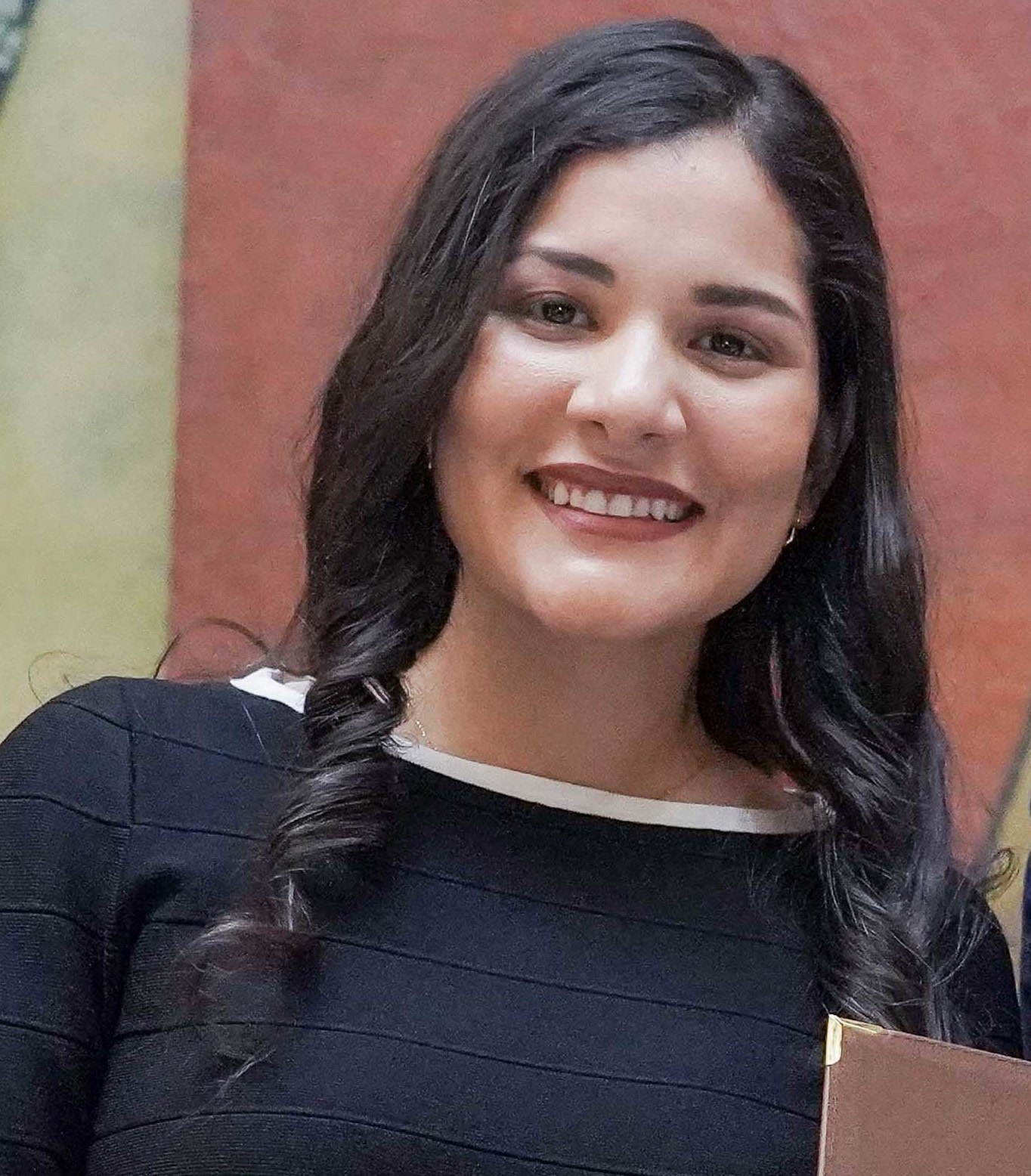
- Almeida in 2019
- Education: University of Espiritu Santo Specialties, Universidad Católica Santiago de Guayaquil
- Occupation: Politician
- Known for: Former president of the Council for Citizen Participation and Social Control

Sofía Almeida is an Ecuadorian politician. She was president of the Council for Citizen Participation and Social Control, between October 2020 and February 2022.

== Early life ==
Almeida was born in Guayaquil, she studied Business Sciences at the University of Espiritu Santo Specialties. She completed a master's degree in Business Administration at the Universidad Católica Santiago de Guayaquil.

== Career ==
She worked for the Comptroller General of the State of Ecuador for around eleven years.

=== President of the CPCCS ===
Almeida was elected as a member of the Council for Citizen Participation and Social Control of Ecuador during the 2019 Ecuadorian sectional elections. The six other members elected were María Fernanda Rivadeneira, Victoria Desintonio, Rosa Chalá, José Carlos Tuárez, Walter Gomez Ronquillo and Christian Cruz. The announcement in May 2019 had taken 54 days and six candidates had been excluded.

After the dismissal of four of her colleagues in August 2019, the reformed plenary session of the council resolved to appoint Almeida as the new vice president with six votes in favor and one abstention. In October 2020, after the removal of Christian Cruz, the second person to hold the position of president, she as vice-president assumed the presidency.

On the 9 February 2022 Hernán Ulloa replaced her as President of the council after the majority of councillors decided that Almeida should be removed as President, and David Rosero should lose his position of Vice President. This was done when only four councillors were present and it was behind a police cordon. David Rosero, Juan Javier Dávalos and Almeida were not there and Almeida did not arrive until 4pm. She accused the four present of creating a coup and she blamed the President for his interference.

A month later the new council had failed to make any appointments.
