= Andrea González Nader =

Ecuadorian environmental activist and politician

Andrea González Náder
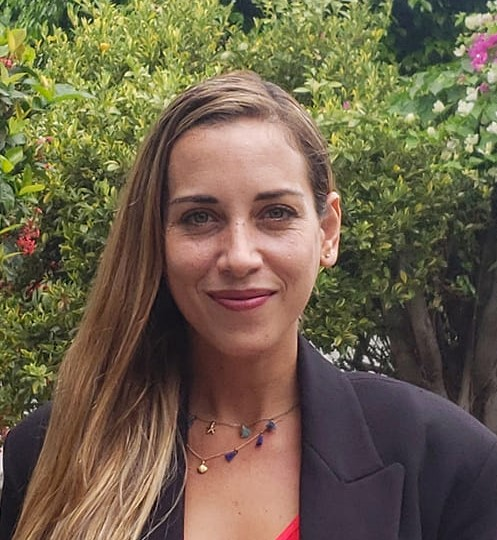
- Born: Andrea Belén González Nader; 1 April 1987 (age 39); Guayaquil, Ecuador
- Education: Universidad Del Pacífico – Ecuador
- Occupations: Environmental activist, Entrepreneur
- Title: Engineering Degree in Environmental Technology

Andrea Belén González Nader (born 1 April 1987) is an Ecuadorian environmental activist, entrepreneur and political figure. She ran for vice-president in the 2023 general election and for president in the 2025 general election.

== Biography ==
Born in Guayaquil, González holds an Engineering degree in Environmental Technology from Universidad Del Pacífico. After graduating, she founded and led several environmental organizations.

=== Political career ===
In 2018 González ran for the vice prefecture of Guayas for the Popular Unity party and, in 2020, she ran for a seat in the National Assembly; although both bids were unsuccessful.

Fernando Villavicencio, the presidential candidate in the 2023 general election of the political party Movimiento Construye (MC-25), named her as his vice-presidential running mate. Villavicencio was assassinated on 9 August after a rally, at which point the party began exploring the possibility of González replacing him on the presidential ticket. On 12 August, González was announced as the new presidential candidate. However, there were legal uncertainties regarding her eligibility, and on 13 August they backtracked on their decision and named the journalist Christian Zurita as the candidate, with González as his running mate. The formula received 16.37% of the vote in the first round, placing third, and was eliminated.

In June 2024, González Náder registered as a pre-candidate for president of Ecuador in the 2025 general election. In the first round held on 9 February, she received 2.70% of the total votes, placing fourth, and was eliminated.
