= Fernando Villavicencio =

Ecuadorian politician (1963–2023)

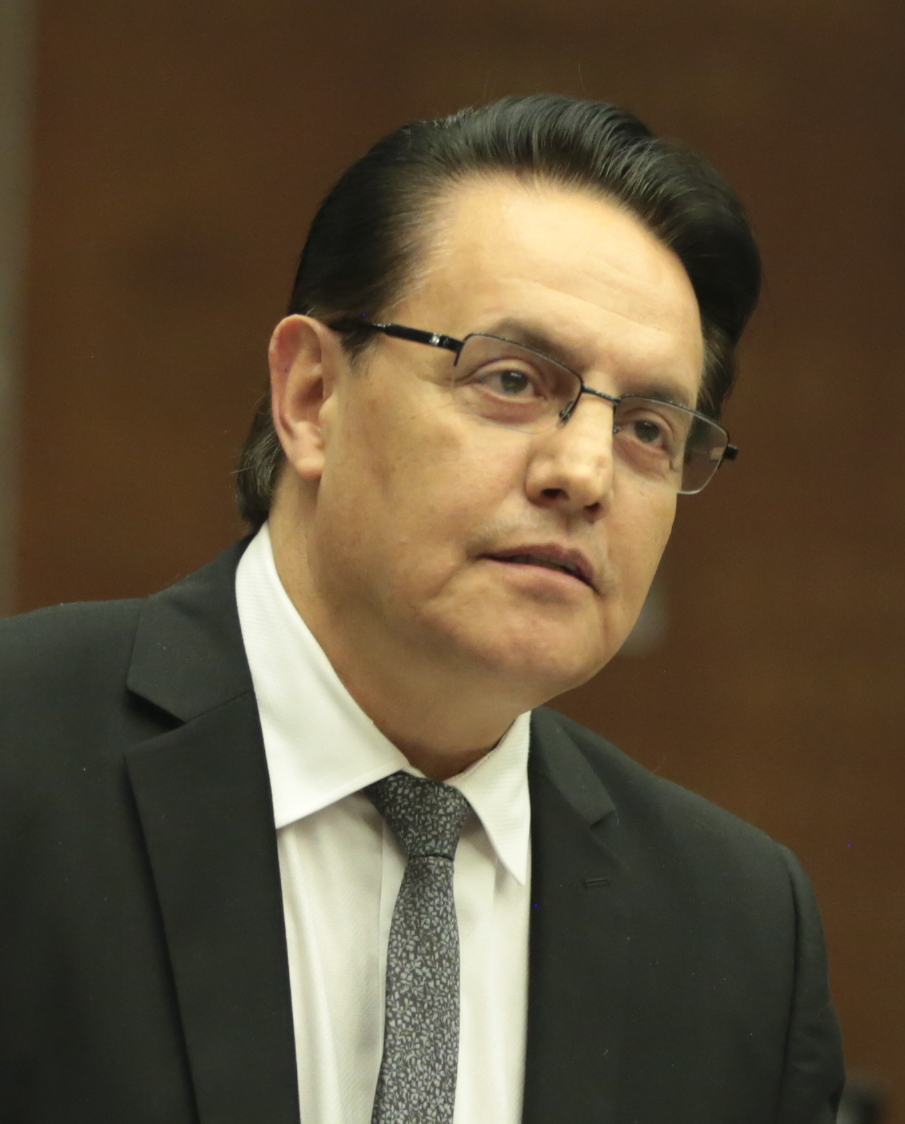
- Villavicencio in January 2023

Member of the National Assembly
- In office 14 May 2021 – 17 May 2023
- Constituency: National constituency

Personal details
- Born: Fernando Alcibiades Villavicencio Valencia; 11 October 1963 Alausí, Chimborazo, Ecuador
- Died: 9 August 2023 (aged 59) Quito, Ecuador
- Cause of death: Assassination by gunshot
- Resting place: Monteolivo Cemetery, Quito
- Party: Movimiento Construye (2023)
- Other political affiliations: Pachakutik (1995–2017); Coalition Movement (2018–2021)
- Spouse: Verónica Sarauz
- Children: 5
- Education: Cooperative University of Colombia

Fernando Alcibiades Villavicencio Valencia (Spanish: [feɾˈnando alsiˈβjaðes βiʝaβiˈsensjo βaˈlensja]; 12 October 1963 – 9 August 2023) was an Ecuadorian journalist, trade unionist, and politician who ran for president of Ecuador in the 2023 Ecuadorian general election. He served as a member of the National Assembly from 2021 until the dissolution of the legislative body on 17 May 2023, which caused the 2023 Ecuadorian political crisis and a snap election.

Prior to his political career, Villavicencio was an investigative journalist covering corruption and violence in Ecuador. A critic of former president Rafael Correa, Villavicencio was in exile in Peru after legal issues following his public critiques of the Correa administration. He spent several months imprisoned until all charges were dropped in February 2018.

Having unsuccessfully run for the National Assembly in 2017, Villavicencio was elected in 2021, representing the national constituency. In May 2023, he announced his presidential candidacy for that year's general election. Following a campaign rally in Quito, Villavicencio was assassinated by gunshot on 9 August 2023.

== Early life and education ==
Fernando Alcibiades Villavicencio Valencia was born in Alausí, in the province of Chimborazo. He studied journalism and communication at the Cooperative University of Colombia. He was married to Verónica Sarauz, whom he met while working at the National Assembly. They have five children together.

He joined Petroecuador in 1996 first as a social communicator and then as a trade unionist until 1999, when he was fired by the government of Jamil Mahuad.

== Journalism career ==
Villavicencio began his journalism career with El Universo in Guayaquil. During his investigative career at El Universo, he was critical of various governments including that of Gustavo Noboa, whom he accused of corruption.

Villavicencio was the first to report about detailed security logs on Julian Assange that staff and security guards at Ecuador's UK embassy kept. In 2015, Cynthia Viteri and Villavicencio sent secret documents to WikiLeaks showing that Ecuador was using an Italian company to run a surveillance program that was spying on journalists and political enemies, in addition to spying on Julian Assange in the embassy. The New York Times reported that leaked chat logs from 2015 show that Assange and his inner circle were aware of the documents, which were not published by WikiLeaks.

In December 2018, WikiLeaks alleged that Villavicencio was a "serial fabricator" involved in a story in The Guardian which claimed that U.S. President Donald Trump's former campaign manager Paul Manafort had met Assange in the Ecuadorian embassy. Whilst TheGuardian.com identified the story as having been written only by Dan Collyns and Luke Harding, the print edition mentioned Villavicencio's name as a third author.

== 2022 attempted assassination ==
In the early hours of 3 September 2022, he was the victim of an attack, his home was hit by bullets, for which he received the solidarity of a group of assembly members.

== Political career ==
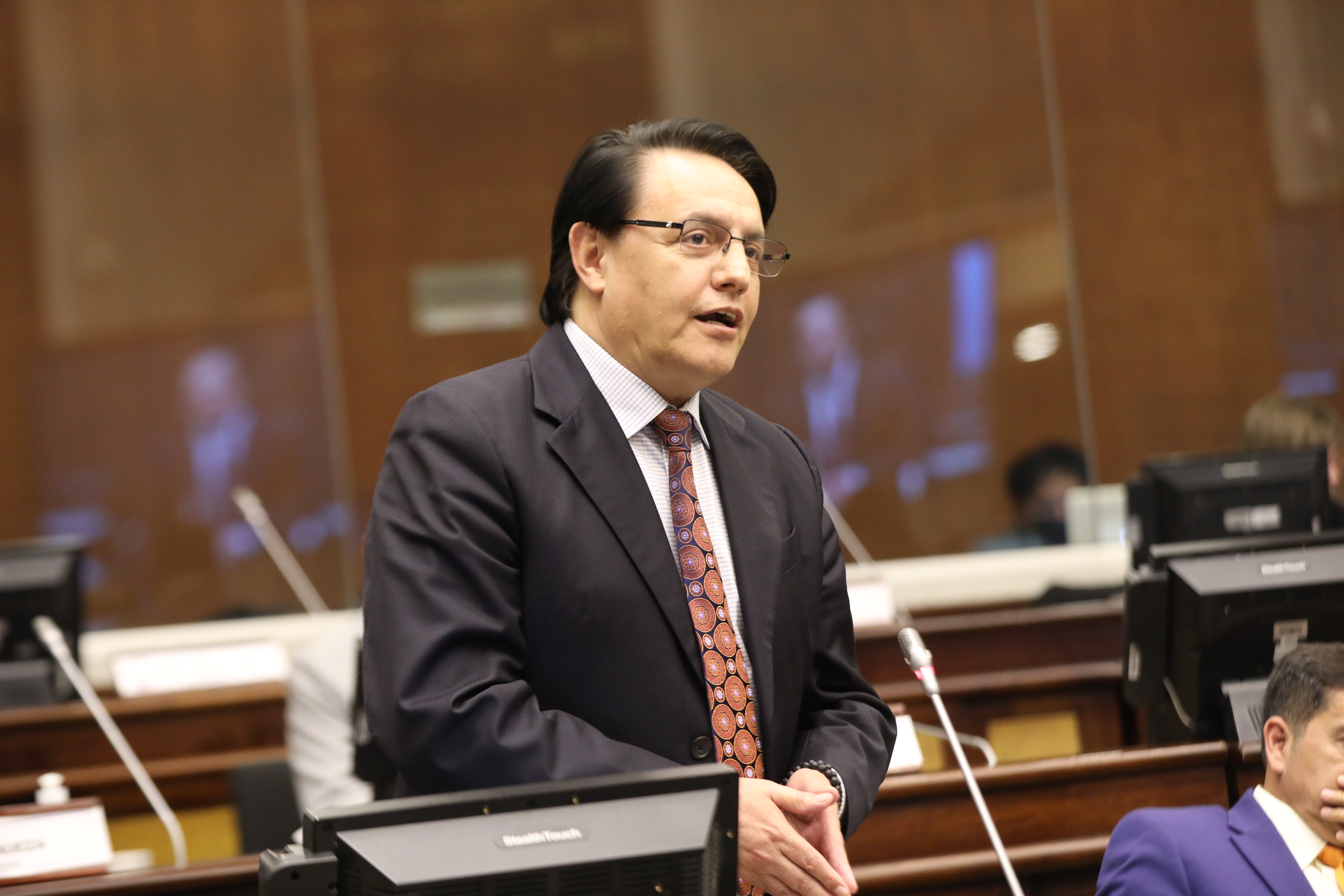
Villavicencio addressing the National Assembly in April 2022

After college, he was one of the founders of the Pachakutik Party in 1995.

During the 2013–2014 National Assembly session, Villavicencio was a parliamentary assistant to Cléver Jiménez. During this time, Jiménez and Villavicencio accused President Rafael Correa of having ordered an armed incursion at a hospital during a police revolt in September 2010. He was sued by Correa for libel, and Villavicencio was sentenced to 18 months in prison. He traveled to Washington, D.C., seeking assistance from the Inter-American Commission on Human Rights, but when he returned to Ecuador, he already had an arrest warrant against him. Instead of turning himself in, he hid in the Amazon region until his sentence expired.

At first, when he announced his parliamentary candidacy for the 2017 general election, his campaign was disallowed due to his legal charges. Once the charges were dismissed, he was able to resume his campaign; however, he lost the election. After his defeat, he was arrested on charges of insult and espionage following his criticisms of the Correa administration. He fled to Peru and during his asylum in the country, all charges against him were dropped in February 2018.

Villavicencio ran again for the National Assembly in 2021 under the Honesty Alliance, this time winning a seat for the national constituency. In September 2022, Villavicencio claimed he was the target of an assassination attempt after his Quito home was allegedly attacked by gunfire.

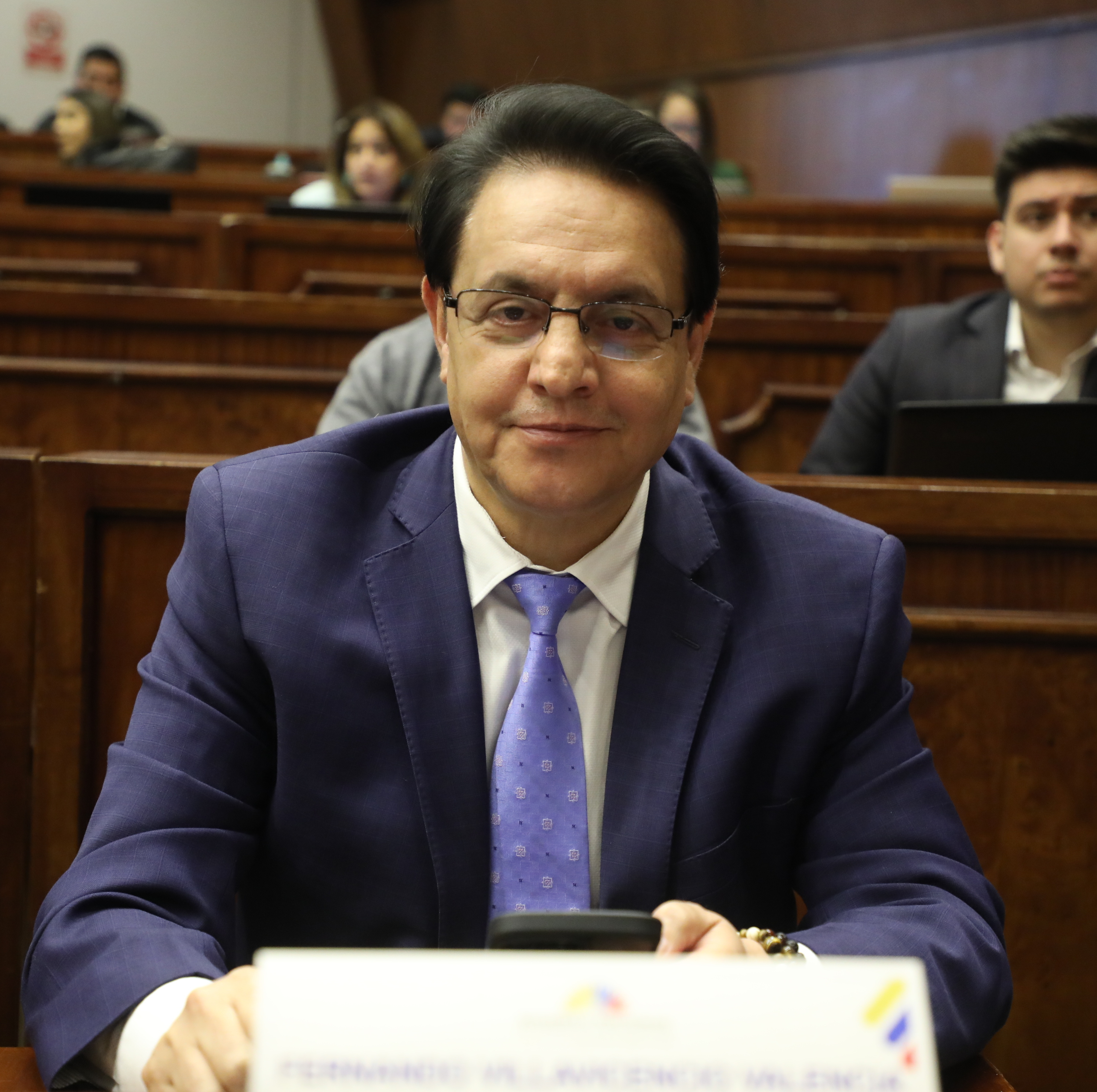
Villavicencio in April 2023

In May 2023, his tenure at the National Assembly ended with President Guillermo Lasso's dissolution of the National Assembly. Prior to the dissolution, Villavicencio was criticized by several Assembly members due to his obstruction of Lasso's impeachment process.

=== 2023 presidential campaign ===
Shortly after the National Assembly was dissolved, Villavicencio announced his candidacy for president of Ecuador in the 2023 election. He focused on the growing corruption, violence in the country, and environmental protection. During his campaign, he called Ecuador a "narco state" due to the rise in gang-related violence.

In June 2023, he named environmentalist Andrea González Náder as his running mate on the Movimiento Construye (MC-25) ticket. On 10 June, the Villavicencio-González ticket registered its candidacy for the MC-25 alliance. On 16 June, the National Electoral Council rejected his candidacy due to insufficient information; however, the issue was resolved and his candidacy was approved four days later.

A 9 July poll found Villavicencio in fourth place, polling at 10.23%. A week later on 18 July, a poll found Villavicencio polling in second place with 13.2%, with former Assemblywoman Luisa González in first place at 26.6%. In August 2023, at the time of his assassination, Villavicencio had been polling at 7.5%. Another poll conducted on the day of his assassination, found him in second place behind González.

After his assassination, he was replaced on the ballot by a journalist, Christian Zurita, while Villavicencio's running mate Andrea González remained on the ballot.

== Assassination and trial ==
On 9 August 2023 at 18:20 (ET), Villavicencio was shot in the head while entering a vehicle shortly after concluding a campaign rally at the Colegio Anderson in the northern part of Quito. During the attack, the gunmen also threw a grenade, but it failed to detonate. Villavicencio was rushed to a nearby clinic where he was pronounced dead. He was 59 years old. Nine others were also injured during the shooting, including two police officers. Villavicencio was guarded at the time of the assassination. A suspect in the assassination was killed during a shootout.

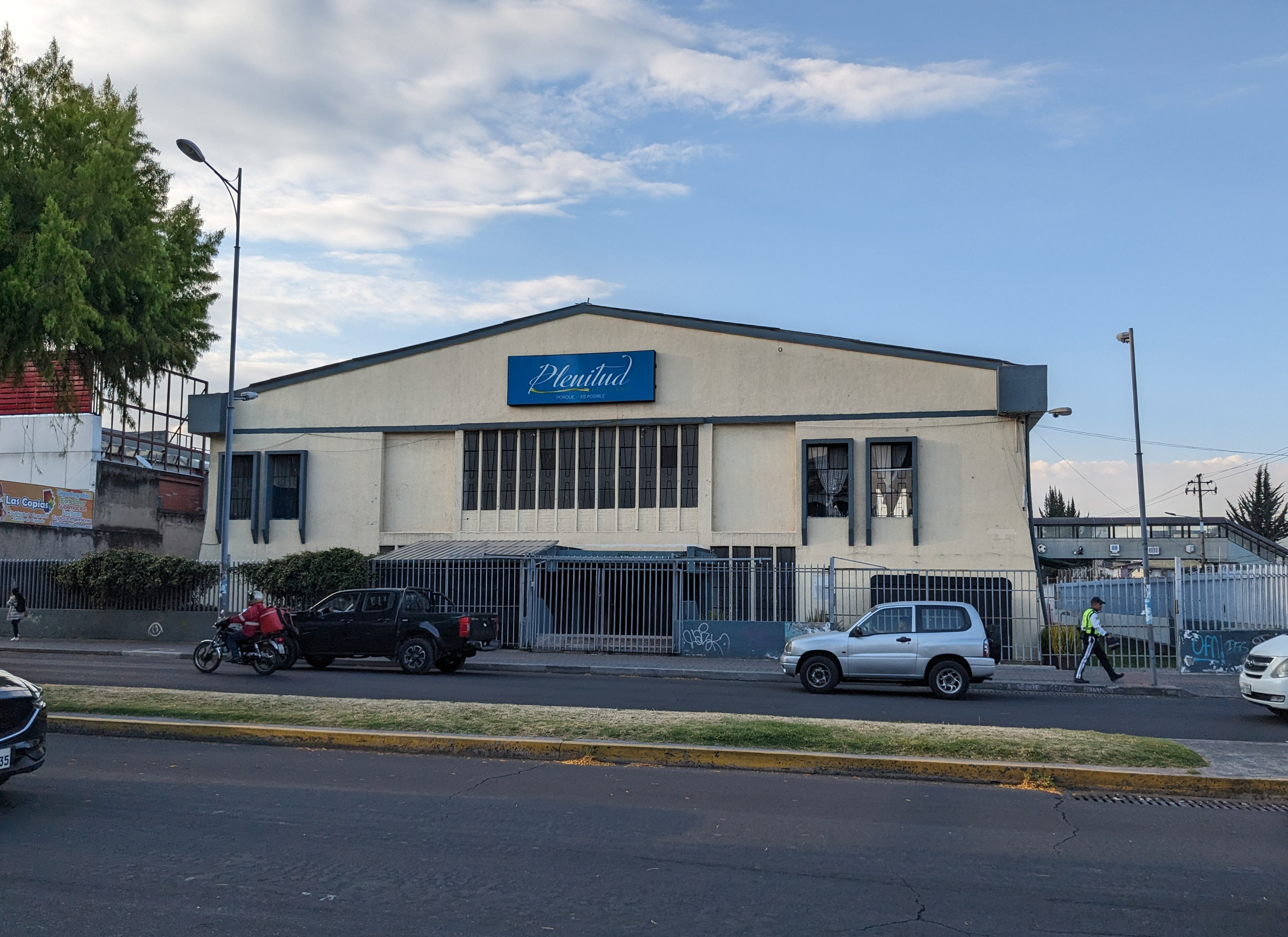
Colegio Anderson, where Villavicencio was assassinated

His assassination occurred less than two weeks before the general election. A day prior to his death, Villavicencio made a report to the Justice Ministry about an unnamed oil business; no further details about the report are known. The Washington Post noted that his assassination occurred during a time of increasing gang violence in the country. Villavicencio had received multiple death threats; including one from the Sinaloa Cartel during his presidential campaign, with the most recent being a week prior to the shooting.

President Guillermo Lasso confirmed Villavicencio's death and said that the "crime will not go unpunished". After the attack, Lasso requested a security meeting with officials at Palacio de Carondelet in Quito. Presidential candidate Jan Topić used Villavicencio's assassination as a reason to act against the growing violence in the country. Presidential candidates Yaku Pérez, Xavier Hervas, Otto Sonnenholzner, and Luisa González expressed their condolences and condemned the attack. Former President Correa remarked on his killing that Ecuador had become a "failed state" and warned that "those who try to sow more hate" with his death "will only continue to destroy us".

The electoral observation mission of the Organization of American States (OAS), due to begin arriving in Ecuador the following day, issued a statement in which it condemned the murder, shared the grief and consternation of the Ecuadorian people, and called on the authorities to conduct a thorough and comprehensive investigation.

Videos of the attack began circulating on social media shortly after his death was confirmed. Videos showed Villavencio entering a vehicle when several shots were fired with witnesses screaming. Villaviencio's party also said that armed men had attacked their offices in Quito on the day of the assassination.

Following the assassination, Villavicencio's widow Verónica Sarauz said that his security team had failed. Villavicencio's running mate Andrea González said that a street in his hometown of Alausí would be named in Villavicencio's honor. In a video released on social media that evening, a criminal group known as Los Lobos claimed responsibility for the attack, but the authenticity of the video was questioned.

On 9 August, six Colombian men were detained in connection with the assassination, but were later killed in prison on 6 October. Two days later on 11 August, a public memorial for Villavicencio was held at the Quito Exhibition Center followed by a private funeral for relatives and associates. He was buried at Monteolivo Cemetery in northern Quito the following day.

On 12 July 2024, a court in Quito sentenced Carlos Angulo, the alleged leader of the Los Lobos gang, and Laura Castilla to 34 years' imprisonment for ordering the assassination. Three other accomplices were also sentenced to 12 years' imprisonment.

On 8 April 2025, Villavicencio's widow, Verónica Sarauz, denounced, through her Twitter account, that the investigation process proposed by the Ecuadorian Attorney General's Office, in charge of Diana Salazar Méndez, is tainted by political and drug trafficking interests, and even that the Prosecutor herself and President Daniel Noboa could be involved in concealing information about Fernando's murder.
