= María Fernanda Rivadeneira =

Ecuadorian lawyer and politician

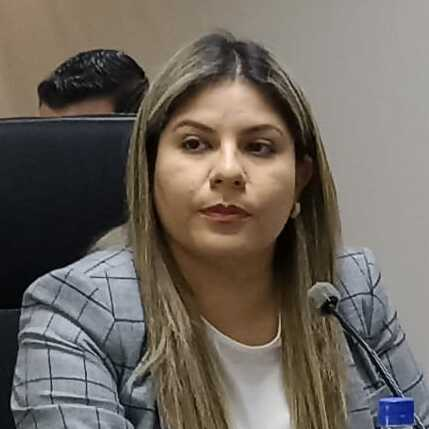
- 2022 at the CPCCS
- Occupation: lawyer

María Fernanda Rivadeneira is an Ecuadorian lawyer who was elected as a counsellor of the Council for Citizen Participation and Social Control.

== Biography ==
Rivadeneira was elected by a national vote to become one of the first seven elected to the Council for Citizen Participation and Social Control. This body's activities includes the recognition of 150 national heroes. The members elected were Victoria Desintonio, Sofía Almeida, Rosa Chalá, José Carlos Tuárez, Walter Gómez, Christian Cruz and Rivadeneira. The announcement in May 2019 had taken 54 days and six candidates had been excluded for irregularities.

Rivadeneira was sued for slander by the council's chair, Christian Cruz, and she was sentenced to six months in jail.

On appeal the conviction was quoshed. On the 9 February 2022 Hernán Ulloa replaced Sofia Almeida as President of the CCPCS after the councillors decided that they preferred Ulloa. The other members were David Rosero, Javier Dávalos, Francisco Bravo, Ibeth Estupiñán and Rivadeneira.

On 23 January 2023 she as vice President and the other members of the CCPCS were all dismissed by the Judicial Court. The court dismissed them because they had failed to vote in a new President of the CCPCS. She appealled the decision arguing that she was not responsible for the failure to elect a president. She had supported two candidates but neither of them had gained the four votes required to win. It was in her control to make sure that they were elected. This was an important point as she was also standing to be re-elected to the CCPCS.
