= Lolita Huning Pooler =

American folklorist (1889–1966)

- Lolita Huning Pooler, from a 1963 newspaper photo
- Born: Dolores Huning; October 21, 1889; Los Lunas, New Mexico, U.S.
- Died: October 12, 1966 aged 76); Albuquerque, New Mexico, U.S.
- Occupations: Folklorist, educator

Dolores "Lolita" Huning Pooler (October 21, 1889 – October 1966) was an American educator and folklorist, based in New Mexico. She was one of the founders of the New Mexico Folklore Society, and on the staff of the San Jose Project, an experimental school in the 1930s.

== Early life and education ==
Huning was born in Los Lunas, New Mexico the daughter of rancher Louis Huning and Henrike "Henny" Busch Huning. Her parents, both born in Germany, socialized with Charles Fletcher Lummis, Adolph Bandelier, Anton Docher, and others interested in the history and culture of the American Southwest. She earned a bachelor's degree at the University of New Mexico in 1929, and a master's degree in 1932, with a thesis titled "Gregory Martinez Sierra: A Study of His Women Characters". She was a charter member of the University of New Mexico chapter of Phi Mu.

== Career ==
Pooler taught school as a young woman. In 1931 she was one of the five founding members of the New Mexico Folklore Society. She taught Spanish and German at the University of New Mexico and the Sandia Girls School in the 1930s, and joined archaeological excavations at Chaco Canyon and the Alameda Pueblo. She was on the staff of the San Jose Project, an experimental school program working on issues of bilingual and bicultural education in rural New Mexico.

Pooler was co-director of the Spanish Language Workshop at the University of New Mexico during World War II, and remained active in the leadership of the New Mexico Folklore Society through the late 1940s. She taught Spanish at Manzano Day School in the 1940s and 1950s.

== Publications ==
Pooler's work appeared in academic journals including New Mexico Quarterly and Western Folklore. She also contributed to a collection, Hispanic Folk Songs of New Mexico (1956).

- "Cuentos populares españoles de Nuevo México" (1930)
- "La Bruja" (1932)
- "The San Jose Project" (1933, with L. S. Tireman and Mela Sedillo Brewster)
- "Three Spanish Folk Tales" (1936, with Irene Fisher)
- "Alameda Pueblo Ruins" (1940)
- "New Mexican Folk Tales" (1951)
- "Spanish Folk Tales" (1956)

== Personal life ==
Huning married forest manager Frank Clay Winsor Pooler in 1913. They had a son Clay, and a daughter, Louise. Her husband died in 1960, and she died in 1966, at the age of 76, in Albuquerque.
