= Lewis Pooler =

Lewis Arthur Trevor James Galbraith Pooler (29 January 1858 – 15 June 1924) was an Anglican priest in Ireland during the 20th century.

The son of James Galbraith Pooler he was educated at The Royal School, Armagh and Trinity College, Dublin where he was a Double First Prizeman. After a teaching post at his old school he was ordained deacon in 1882 and priest in 1883. His first post was a curacy at St James' Church, Belfast. He was Rector of Hollymount from 1899 to 1912; and Archdeacon of Down from 1912 until his death. He was also an Honorary Canon of St Patricks Cathedral, Dublin; an Examining Chaplain to successive Bishops of Down, Connor and Dromore; Rural Dean of Lecale East; a Member of the Representative Church Body of the Church of Ireland; and Honorary Secretary of its General Synod.

== Books by Pooler ==
- History of the Church of Ireland, 2nd edn, 1902
- Studies in the Religion of Israel, 1904
- Eschatology of the Psalms, 1904
- St Patrick in Co. Down, a Reply to Professor Zimmer, 1904
- Down and its Parish Church, 1907
- Social Questions, 1910
- Urgent Social Problems, 1912
