= Rosa Chalá =

Ecuadorian lawyer and politician (born 1965)

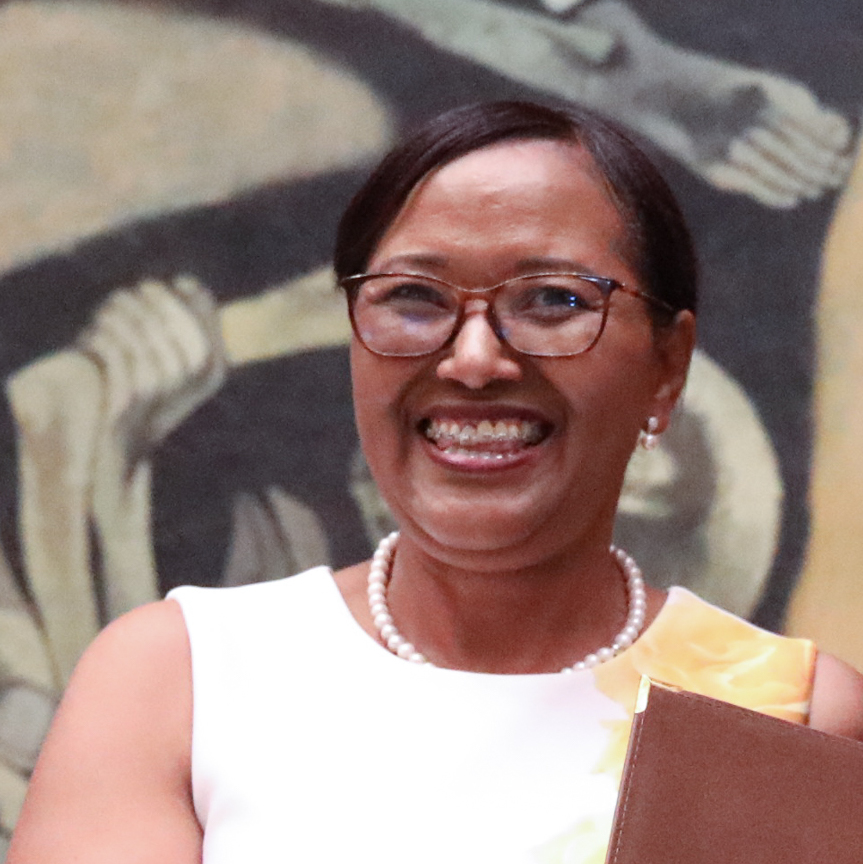
- Born: 1965 (age 60–61)
- Occupation: lawyer
- Known for: brief election to the Council for Citizen Participation and Social Control

Maria Rosa Chala Alencastro (born c. 1965) is an Ecuadorian lawyer and politician.

== Life ==
Chalá was born in about 1965 and she studied to become a lawyer.

In 2016, she was an electoral specialist, and from 2017 to August 2018, she was an analyst looking at Electoral Expenditure.

She stood as a candidate in 2019 for the Council for Citizen Participation and Social Control, which is made up of seven members who are elected in a national election for four years. The members elected were Victoria Desintonio, María Fernanda Rivadeneira, Sofía Almeida, José Carlos Tuárez, Walter Gómez Ronquillo, Christian Cruz and Chalá. The announcement in May took 54 days and six candidates had been excluded for irregularities.

In August 2019, the National Assembly believed that members of the council had behaved unconstitutionally and they had started to review former decisions that a constitutional court had placed outside their jurisdiction. The assembly had four members removed after a vote in which 84 members voted in favour; José Tuárez, Walter Gómez, Victoria Desintonio, and Chala were censored and dismissed from the council. Victoria Desintonio would later be elected as a member of the assembly.

On 11 December, a judge ruled that the 84 members who dismissed Chala and her three colleagues had ignored Chala's constitutional rights and that she should be returned to the council. The assembly reacted with disagreement. On 18 December 2019, Chala said that she was initiating legal action concerning her case with the Inter-American Human Rights System.
