= Mela Sedillo =

American folklorist

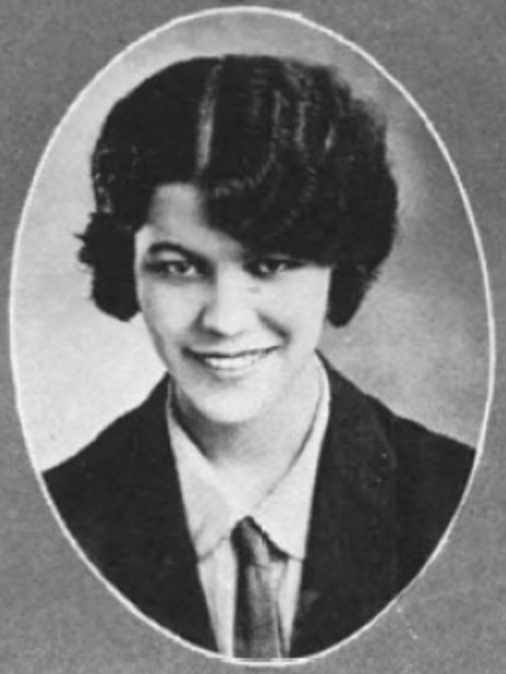
- Mela Sedillo, from the 1925 yearbook of the University of New Mexico
- Born: November 8, 1903; Albuquerque, New Mexico, U.S.
- Died: September 14, 1989 (aged 85); Albuquerque, New Mexico, U.S.
- Other names: Mela Sedillo Brewster, Mela Sedillo Koeber
- Occupations: Folklorist, arts educator

Manuela C. "Mela" Sedillo Brewster Koeber (November 8, 1903 – September 14, 1989) was an American folklorist and arts educator based in New Mexico.

== Early life and education ==
Sedillo was born in Albuquerque, New Mexico, the daughter of Antonio Abad Sedillo and Gertrude "Tula" Vigil. Her father was a lawyer who served in the state legislature. Her older brother Juan A. A. Sedillo also served in the New Mexico legislature; her younger brother Filo Sedillo was a judge.

She graduated from the University of New Mexico (UNM) in 1926. She was a charter member of UNM chapter of Chi Omega, but soon resigned the sorority. She earned a master's degree at Columbia University in the 1930s, on a fellowship from the Rockefeller Foundation.

== Career ==
Sedillo taught art history, folk crafts, dance, and Spanish classes at UNM, where she was a member of the art department faculty from 1932 to 1951. She was the university's first dance teacher. Early in her time there, she was one of only two Latina instructors (the other was Anita Maria Osuna). During the 1930s, she wrote and organized festivals and classes with various New Deal projects to promote New Mexico's arts and literary communities, including the Federal Writers' Project, the Federal Music Program, and the Works Progress Administration (WPA). She spoke at a folklore society meeting in El Paso in 1938.

Sedillo and her second husband, Robert Koeber, owned the historic Refugio Gomez House in Albuquerque, after 1942. She gave a public lecture on Mexican folk dances in Spanish in 1942, and she gave a lecture series on modern art at an Albuquerque gallery in 1946. She served on the state's Parks and Recreation Commission, and was a member of the Albuquerque Open Spaces Advisory Committee. She was a delegate to the Democratic National Convention in 1968.

== Publications ==
In addition to her own publications, Sedillo also contributed recipes to Erna Fergusson's Mexican Cookbook for the 1940 edition.

- "The San Jose Project" (1933, with L. S. Tireman and Lolita Huning Pooler)
- "Mexican Scenes" (1934)
- "Comunion" (1934, a poem in Spanish)
- Mexican and New Mexican Folkdances (1935, 1945)
- "Hija Bruja" (1937, a poem in Spanish)
- A practical study of the use of the natural vegetable dyes in New Mexico (1937)

== Personal life and legacy ==
Sedillo married twice. She married her first husband, Lyman Howard Brewster Jr., in Los Angeles in 1927. They had a daughter, Tulita. Her second husband was Robert Carl Koeber. She died in 1989, at the age of 85. There is a collection of photographs and drawings that she used for teaching, at the Center for Southwestern Research at UNM.
