= Agustín Intriago =

Ecuadorian politician (1985–2023)

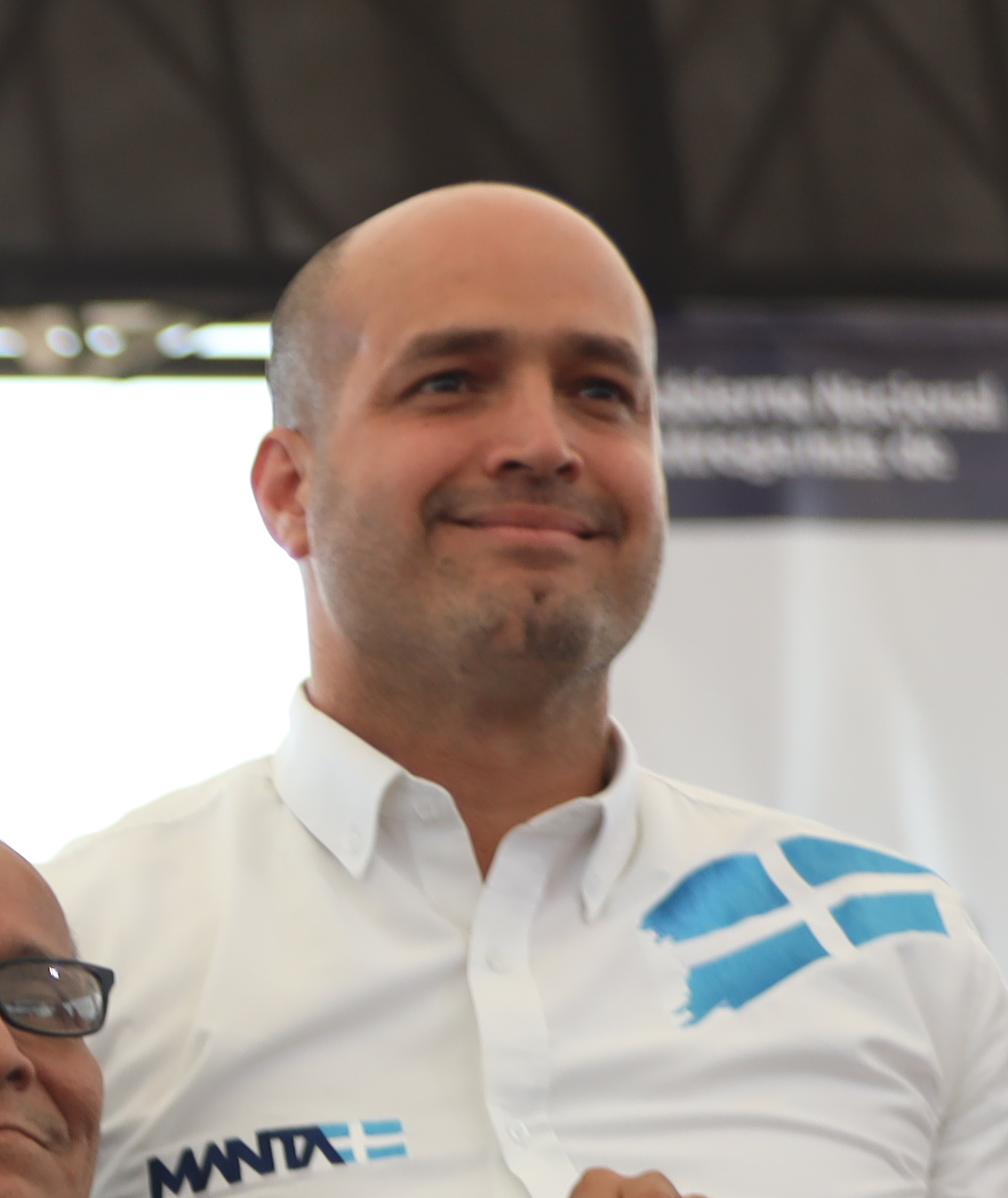

Mayor of Manta
- In office 14 May 2019 – 24 July 2023
- Preceded by: Jorge Zambrano
- Succeeded by: Marciana Valdivieso Zamora

Councilor of Manta
- In office 2009–2014

Personal details
- Born: Agustín Aníbal Intriago Quijano; 20 January 1985 Manta, Ecuador
- Died: 23 July 2023 (aged 38) Manta, Ecuador
- Manner of death: Assassination by gunshots
- Spouse: Rosita Saldarriaga
- Children: 2
- Education: Secular Eloy Alfaro University of Manabí; International University of La Rioja
- Occupation: Lawyer and politician

Agustín Aníbal Intriago Quijano (20 January 1985 – 23 July 2023) was an Ecuadorian lawyer and politician. He served as mayor of Manta, the third largest city in Ecuador from 2019 until his assassination in 2023.

== Early life and education ==
Agustín Aníbal Intriago Quijano was born on January 20, 1985 in the city of Manta, Manabí. He graduated as a lawyer from the Laica Eloy Alfaro University of Manabí and later obtained masters degrees in International Trade and Finance from the same university and in Public Management from the International University of La Rioja.

== Political career ==
Intriago served as a councilor in Manta from 2009 to 2014. During his time in office, he promoted the Youth Council, a group that nurtured young leaders and encouraged development and integration activities. He also put forward significant proposals in the sports field, with the aim of keeping young people away from vices and engaged in recreational activities.

=== Mayor of Manta ===
Intriago was elected mayor of Manta in the municipal elections of 2019, where he achieved a victory with 41.71% of the votes and was re-elected in the municipal elections of 2023, obtaining 61.25% of the votes, surpassing Jaime Estrada Medranda with 35.6%. His term was set to run until 2027.

During his tenure as mayor, he implemented initiatives such as the "Citizen's Mayorship" and worked towards improving the city of Manta. Intriago initiated the Manta Animalista plan by establishing the first Animal Emergency Unit, providing veterinary care and sterilizations. Intriago also led the campaign "Manta Goes Green" with 4030 trees planted.

Additionally, he streamlined municipal procedures by launching the MantApp application, which offered 14 online services, allowing citizens to report problems in their neighborhoods.

== Personal life ==
Agustín Intriago married Rosita Saldarriaga, with whom he had two children.

In 2020, he was in a coma for several days and on mechanical ventilation after contracting COVID-19.

== Death ==
On 23 July 2023, Intriago was shot several times by a gunman while visiting a municipal construction site. The attacker arrived in a stolen pick-up truck. He was pronounced dead in hospital at age of 38. Ariana Estefanía Chancay, a Las Dragonas football player, who was talking to Intriago at the time, was also killed in the shooting. Three others were injured in the attack.

=== Burial ===
Intriago was laid to rest at the Jardines del Edén cemetery in Manta, Ecuador, on July 25, 2023.

=== Trial ===
After the shooting, the driver of the attack was arrested.

On 25 July, Ecuador’s President Guillermo Lasso declared a state of emergency over growing violence in the country. In August, three other perpetrators were arrested for the attack.

Eight months after Intriago and Chancay's murders, six people were convicted of the attack and sentenced to 34 years in prison. The individual who planned the murder has not been found.

== See also ==
- Manta Canton
