= Victoria Desintonio =

Ecuadorian politician (born 1988)

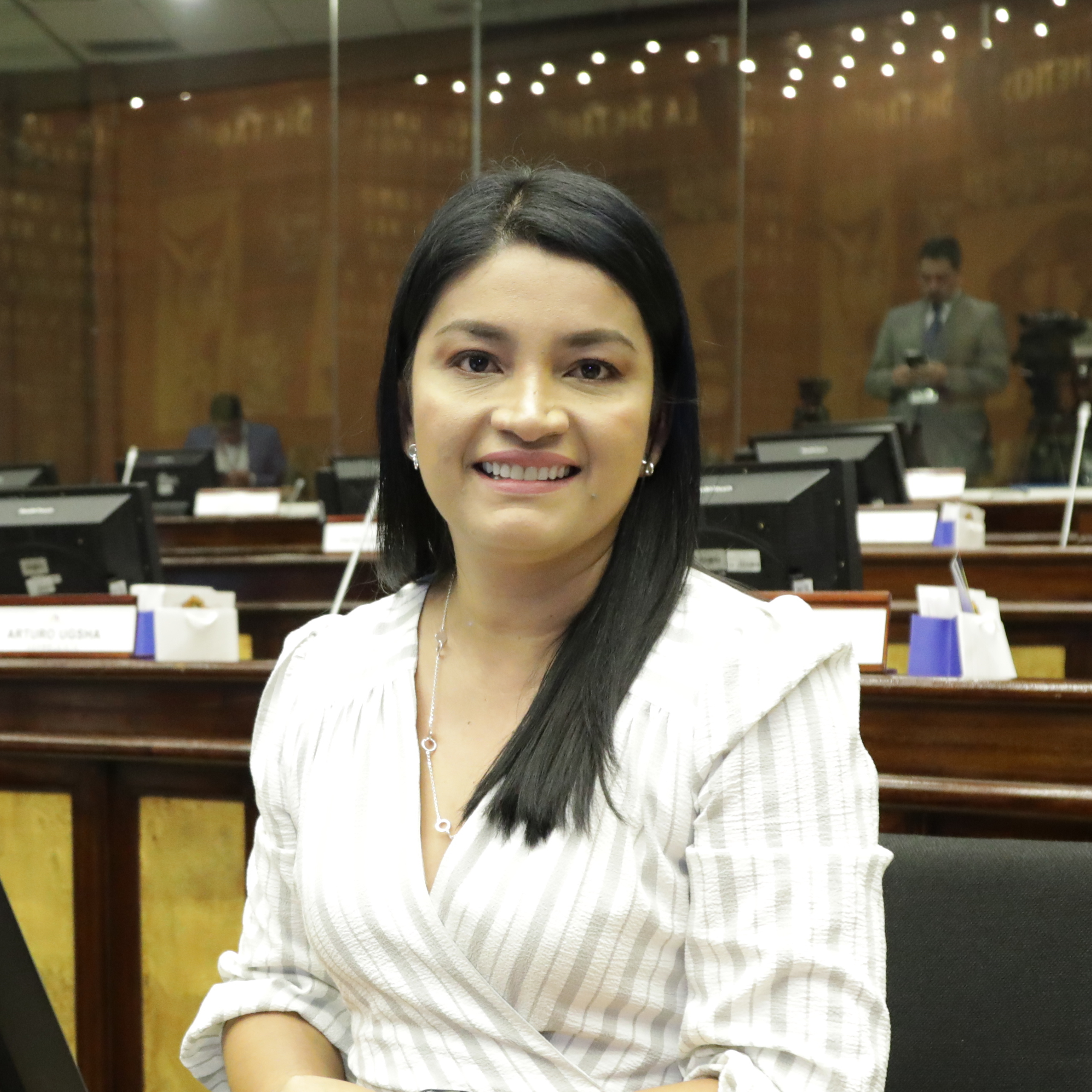
- Desintonio in 2023 at the National Assembly
- Born: 1988 (age 37–38)
- Other name: Victoria Tatiana Desintonio Malavé
- Education: University of Guayaquil
- Occupation: Politician
- Known for: Women's rights campaigner
- Political party: Union for Hope (since 2020)

Victoria Tatiana Desintonio Malavé (born 1988) is an Ecuadorian politician. She was elected to the seven-member Council for Citizen Participation and Social Control by popular vote and was later removed. She then became a member of Ecuador's National Assembly. She is a member of the political coalition Union for Hope (Unión por la Esperanza) and she campaigns for women's rights.

== Life ==
Desintonio was born in 1988. When she was seventeen, she joined the international Jubilee 2000 movement that had campaigned to cut debt in developing countries by the end of the millennium. In 2011 and 2012, she was working as an analyst. She is from Guayaquil and trained as a lawyer at the University of Guayaquil.

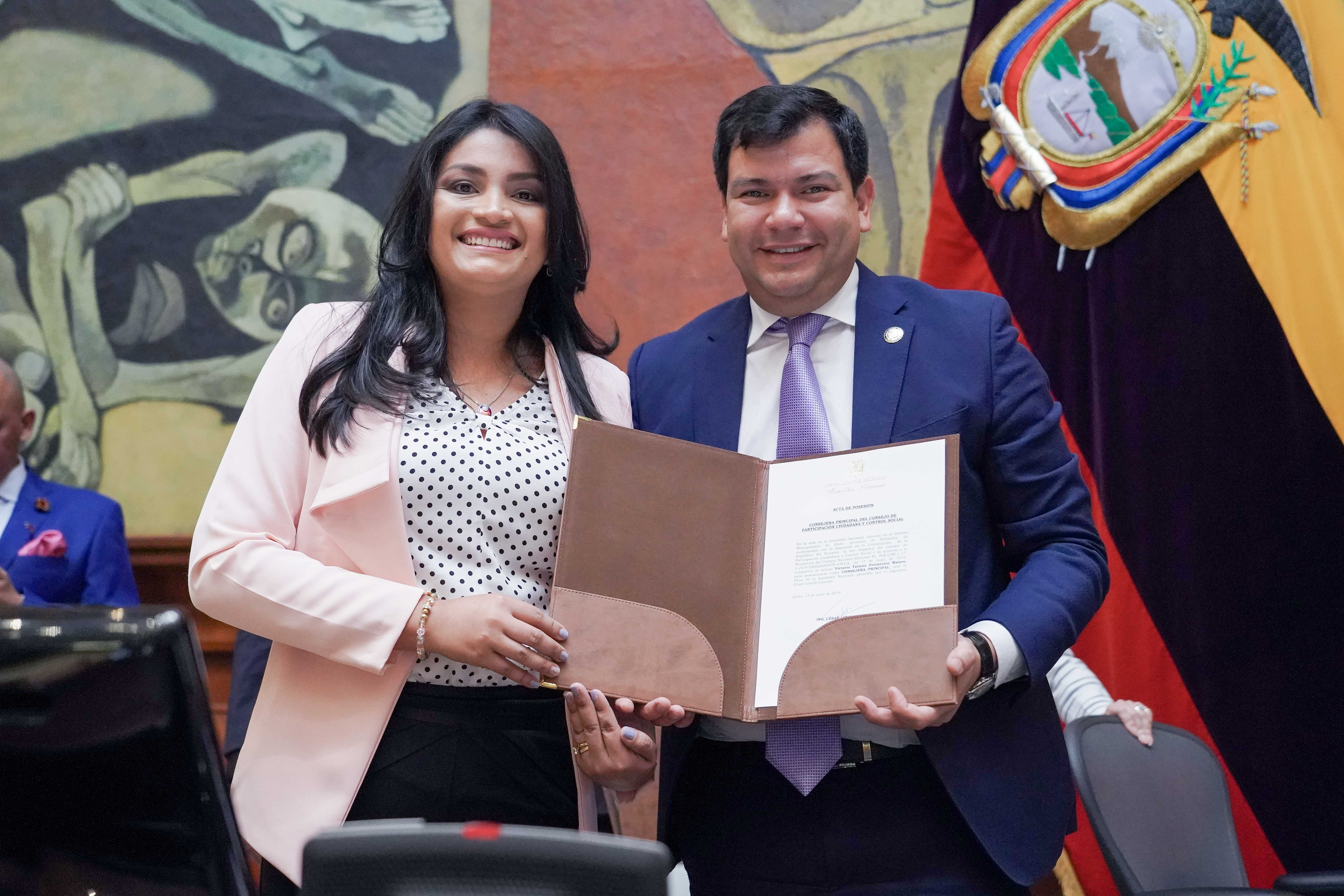
Recognition at the National Assembly of her election as one of the seven-member national council

Desintonio was elected to join the seven-member Council for Citizen Participation and Social Control (CCPSC) for four years in 2019. This body's activities includes the recognition of 150 national heroes. The six other members elected were María Fernanda Rivadeneira, Sofía Almeida, Rosa Chalá, José Carlos Tuárez, Walter Gómez Ronquillo, and Christian Cruz. The announcement in May 2019 had taken 54 days, and six candidates had been excluded. She campaigns for women's rights, and she proposed additions to the law to create a "citizen observatory" watchdog to reduce gender violence; her proposals were accepted. This watchdog was described as the "Citizen Observatory for the Application, Implementation and Effective Compliance of the Comprehensive Organic Law for the Prevention and Eradication of Gender Violence against Women". Desintonio proposed that she would run this watchdog, but the CCPSC decided that it would be handled by the whole council.

Desintonio was removed from the seven-member council with three others in August 2019. Each was allowed to defend their position and Desintonio took an hour and a quarter in which she noted that it had been agreed that council members would be elected by popular vote and now the National Assembly was interfering with elected members. The National Assembly concluded that members of the CPCCS had behaved unconstitutionally and they had the four members removed. After a vote in which 84 members voted in favour, José Tuárez, Rosa Chalá, Walter Gómez, and Desintonio were censured and dismissed from the council. Desintonio was later elected to the 137 strong National Assembly as a member of the political coalition Union for Hope (Unión por la Esperanza). Over 40% of the assembly's members are women.

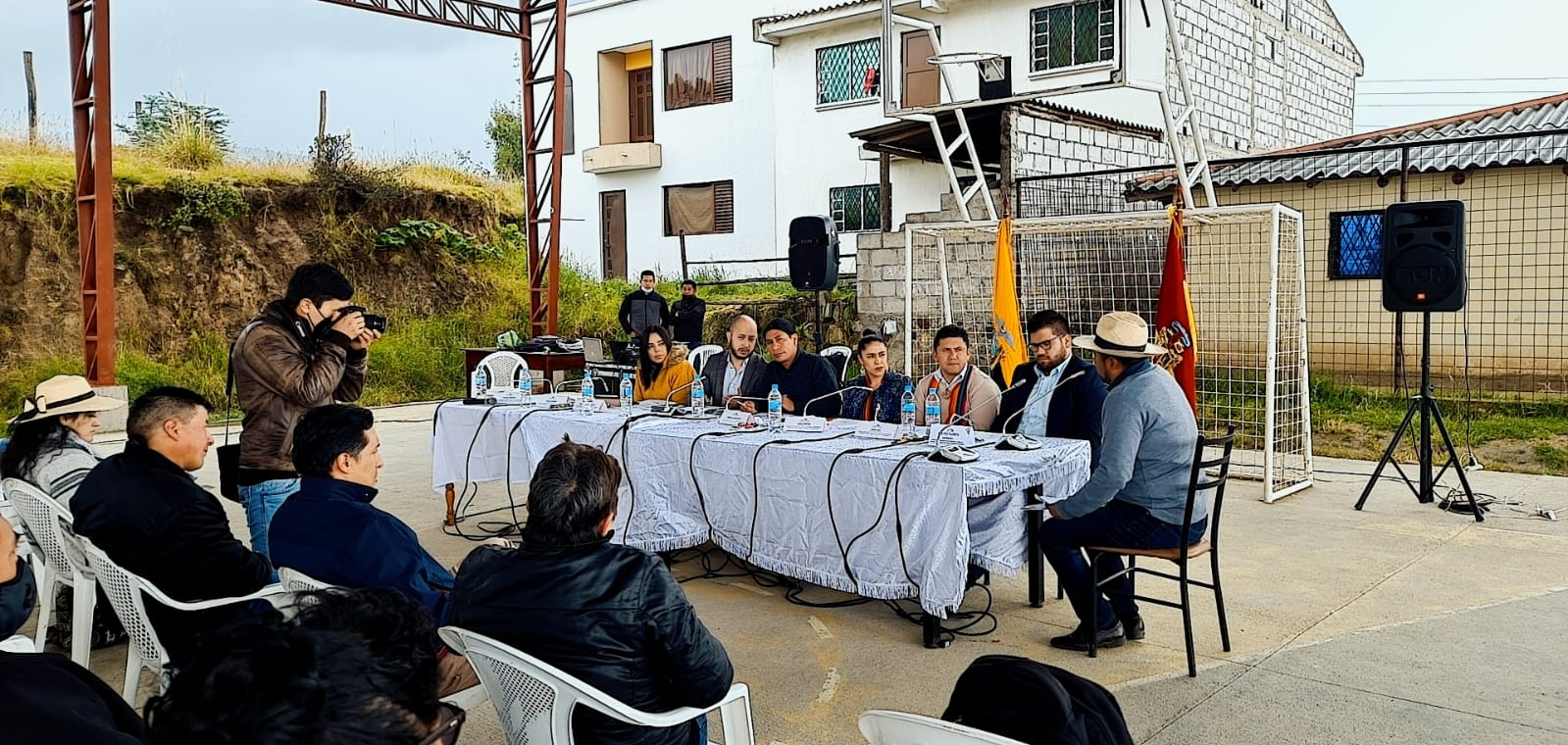
Desintonio (centre of table) at a meeting of the Commission on Constitutional Guarantees in June 2022

She was made the Vice President of the Commission on Constitutional Guarantees, Human Rights, Collective Rights, and Interculturality under Joseph Cabascango as President. The other members of the commission include Paola Castillo, Sofía Sánchez, Fernanda Astudillo, and Guadalupe Llori.

A fellow politician, Bella Jimenez, was brought to account to the National Assembly's Ethics Committee by Alejandro Jaramillo and Desintonio. She was accused of, and later found guilty of taking money from her prospective team members so that they could work for her. She was dismissed from the assembly. The President of Ecuador Guillermo Lasso brought in the constitution clause number 148 known as Mutual death in May 2023 when he knew that he was about to be impeached. This required all of the National Assembly members to stand for re-election. Desintonio was back in the assembly in 2024 and she was the chair of the Commission of Autonomous Governments, Decentralization, Competencies and Territorial Organization. Carlos Vera Mora was her vice-President and the commission's members included Gabriela Molina, Gissella Molina, and Fabiola Sanmartín Parra.

She was re-elected to the National Assembly in 2025. She was chosen as a member of the National Assambly's Commission on the Right to Health and Sport. It is led by Juan José Reyes Baquerizo with Diana Blacio as vice President. Other commission members include Annabella Emma Azín Arce and Milena Cristina Jácome Benites.

== Private life ==
Desintonio is married and has two children.
