= Monica Banegas =

Ecuadorian politician

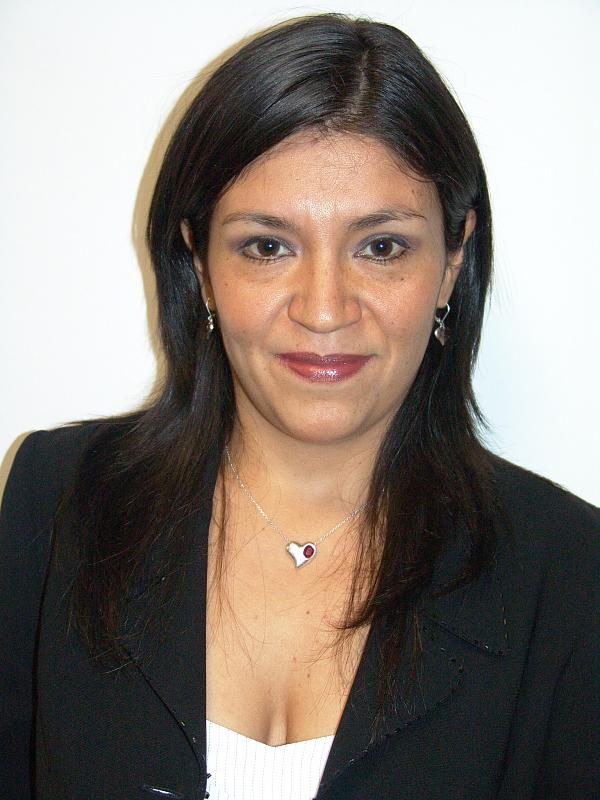
- in 2009
- Born: Monica Eulalia Banegas Cedillo; August 8, 1977 (age 48)
- Occupation: politician
- Known for: Vice President of the Council for Citizen Participation and Social Control

Monica Eulalia Banegas Cedillo (born August 8, 1977) is an Ecuadorian politician. She was Vice President of the Council for Citizen Participation and Social Control of Ecuador from 2009 to 2015.

== Life ==
She was born in 1977 and educated in Spain at the University of Alicante; in Italy at the Università degli Studi Di Palermo, Italy and the International University of La Rioja in Spain. From there she began many years of activism.

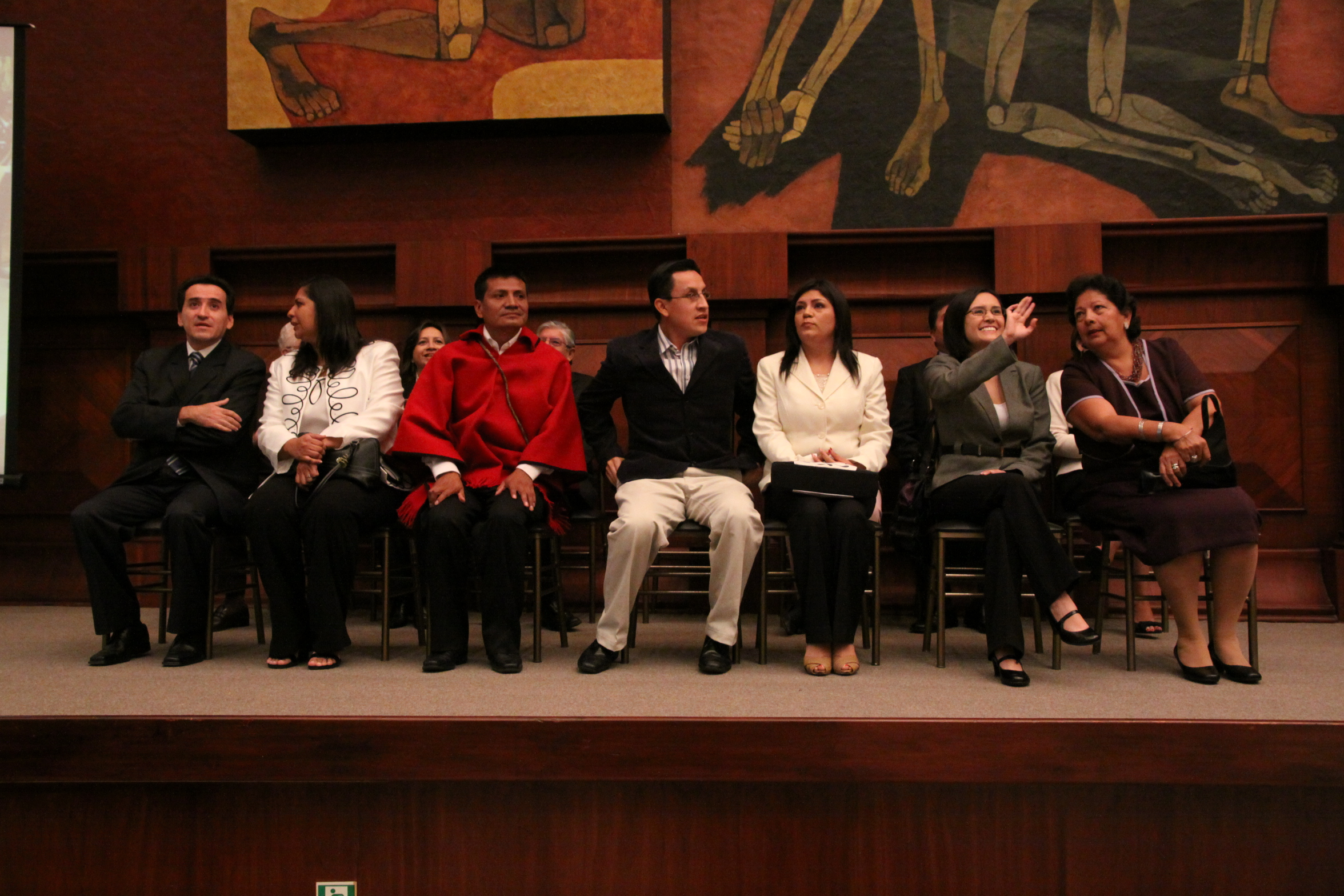
First set elected from the assembly on 18 March 2010.

In March 2010, Ecuador's National Assembly appointed seven principal councilors to the Council for Citizen Participation and Social Control. The seven were Banegas, Marcela Miranda Pérez, Luis Pachala Poma, David Rosero Minda, Fernando Cedeño Rivadeneira, Andrea Rivera Villavicencio and Tatiana Ordeñana Sierra. Sierra was later replaced by Hugo Arias Palacios.

In 2022 she was the executive director of the Observatory of Political Violence against Women. She argued that Ecuador's imposition of gender parity in politics was necessary because political organisations are not far sighted enough. Arianna Tanca who became Ecuador's Minister for Women and Human Rights in 2023 had previously argued that it was demeaning to be chosen for office just because you have ovaries. However research showed that even with parity a smaller number of women put themselves forward for elections.

In 2024, "Challenges for Representation in Ecuador: Scope and Limitations of the 2020 Electoral Reform" was published. The book looked at recent elections in Ecuador. There were over a dozen authors including Banegas.
