= Cedillo del Condado =

Coordinates: 40°07′N 3°55′W

- municipality
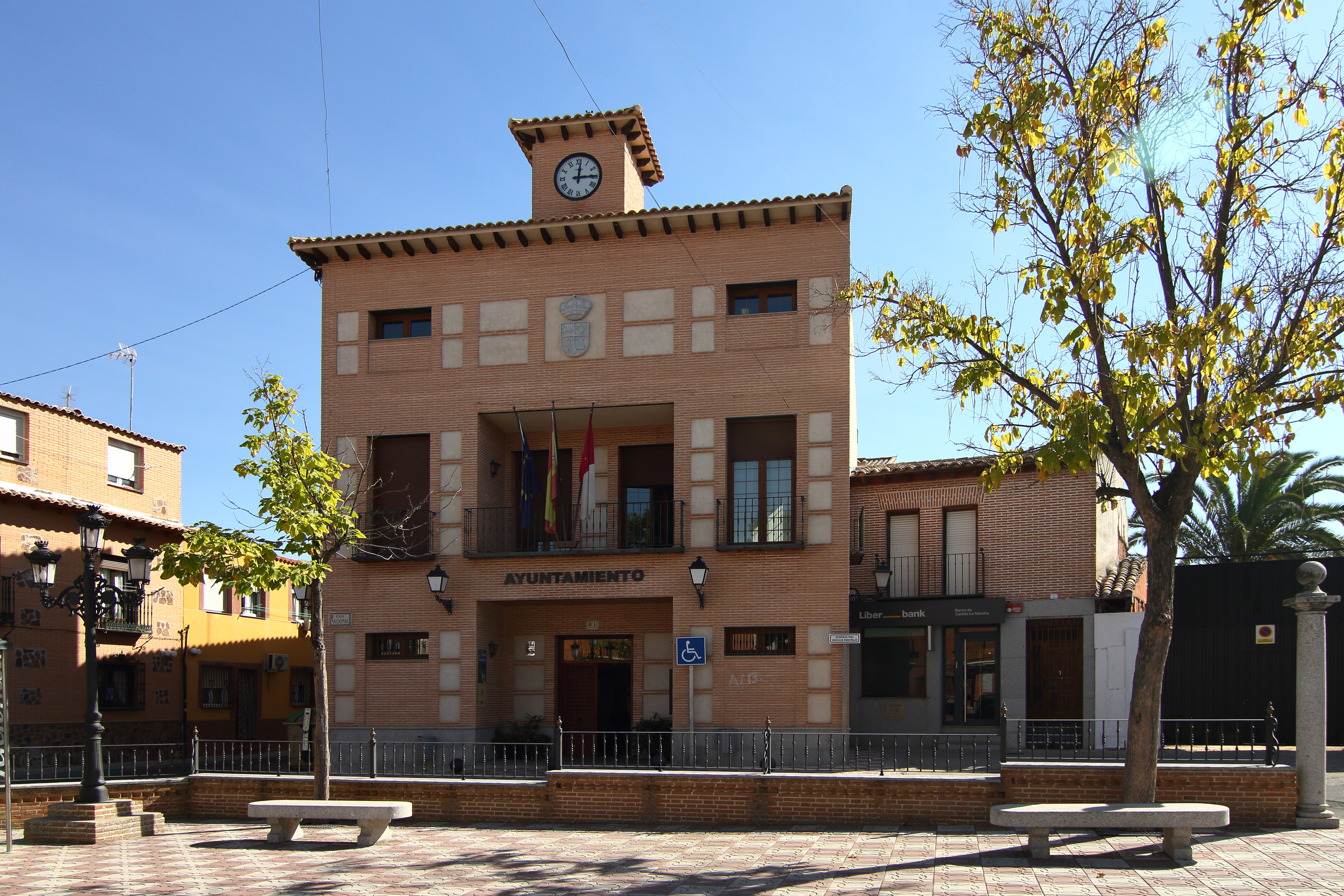
- Cedillo del Condado Town Hall

- Flag Coat of arms
- Interactive map of Cedillo del Condado
- Country: Spain
- Autonomous community: Castile-La Mancha
- Province: Toledo
- Municipality: Cedillo del Condado

Area
  - Total: 26 km^{2} (10 sq mi)
- Elevation: 646 m (2,119 ft)

Population (2025-01-01)
  - Total: 4,525
  - Density: 170/km^{2} (450/sq mi)
- Time zone: UTC+1 (CET)
  - Summer (DST): UTC+2 (CEST)

Cedillo del Condado is a municipality located in the province of Toledo, Castile-La Mancha, Spain. According to the 2006 census (INE), the municipality has a population of 2207 inhabitants.

== Demographics ==
Historical population
| Year | Pop. | ±% |
|---|---|---|
| 1900 | 1,067 | — |
| 1910 | 1,075 | +0.7% |
| 1920 | 1,058 | −1.6% |
| 1930 | 1,161 | +9.7% |
| 1940 | 1,011 | −12.9% |
| 1950 | 1,065 | +5.3% |
| 1960 | 1,055 | −0.9% |
| 1970 | 1,014 | −3.9% |
| 1981 | 947 | −6.6% |
| 1991 | 986 | +4.1% |
| 2001 | 1,568 | +59.0% |
| 2011 | 3,204 | +104.3% |
| 2021 | 4,025 | +25.6% |
| 2023 | 4,204 | +4.4% |
Source: INE
