= Refugio Gomez House =

Historic house in New Mexico, United States

- U.S. National Register of Historic Places
- NM State Register of Cultural Properties
- Location within New Mexico Location within the United States
- Location: 7604 Guadalupe Trail NW, Los Ranchos de Albuquerque, New Mexico
- Coordinates: 35°10′13″N 106°38′24″W
- Built: c. 1875
- Architectural style: Territorial
- NRHP reference No.: 84002864
- NMSRCP No.: 941

Significant dates
- Added to NRHP: February 9, 1984
- Designated NMSRCP: August 25, 1983

The Refugio Gomez House is a historic house in Los Ranchos de Albuquerque, New Mexico. It was built around 1875 and was probably purchased by Refugio Gomez in 1911. In 1942, the house was bought by Mela Sedillo Koeber, who built an addition containing a kitchen and bathroom. The building was added to the New Mexico State Register of Cultural Properties in 1983 and the National Register of Historic Places in 1984. It is located on the same block as another historic property, the Adrian Barela House.

The house is an example of Territorial architecture. It has irregular adobe walls, which are 18 to 24 inches (46 to 61 cm) thick, and simple wooden door and window trim. The original section of the house is at the front, while two additions at the rear date to the 1890s and 1942–43, respectively. A much larger addition was constructed on the south side around 2012. The interior of the house features original wooden floorboards, vigas, and corner fireplaces. The historic nomination also includes an adobe chicken coop on the property which has been converted into a small house.
