= Council for Citizen Participation and Social Control =

CPCCS logo

The Council for Citizen Participation and Social Control (Spanish: Consejo de Participación Ciudadana y Control Social) was created in 2008 in Ecuador. It is an autonomous entity that leads the function of Transparency and Social Control of the Republic of Ecuador. It appoints the people who carry out the role of the Ombudsman, the Comptroller General of the State and the Superintendencies. The seven person council also has influence in the designation of certain authorities of the electoral and judicial function.

== 2010 ==
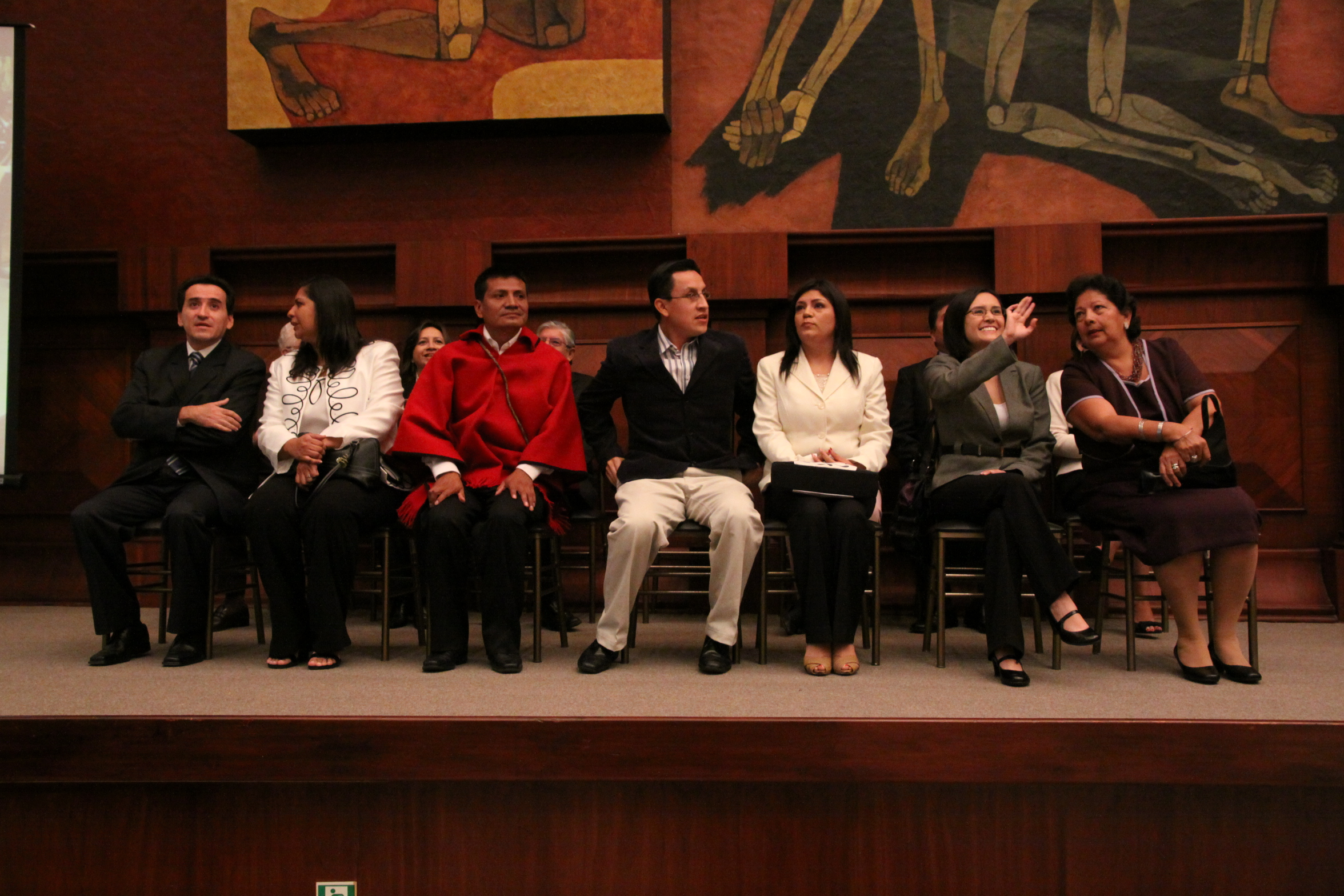
First set elected from the assembly on 18 March 2010.

On March 18, 2010, Ecuador's National Assembly appointed seven principal councilors. The seven were Mónica Banegas Cedillo, Marcela Miranda Pérez, Luis Pachala Poma, David Rosero Minda, Fernando Cedeño Rivadeneira, Andrea Rivera Villavicencio and Tatiana Ordeñana Sierra. Sierra was later replaced by Hugo Arias Palacios. On March 25, 2010, in compliance with the constitutional provisions and the Organic Law of Participation, the election took place after a meeting of the Plenary Council and the sociologist Marcela Miranda Pérez and the lawyer Fernando Cedeño being appointed as President and Vice President of the Council respectively and unanimously. Fernando Cedeño was the council's president for 2.5 years until she handed over to a male chair.

== 2015 ==
The new members were Edwin Jarrín, Tito Astudillo Sarmiento, Doris Gallardo Cevallos, Tania Pauker Cueva, Yolanda González Lastre, Luis Burbano Espinoza and Juan Peña Aguirre.

== 2019 ==
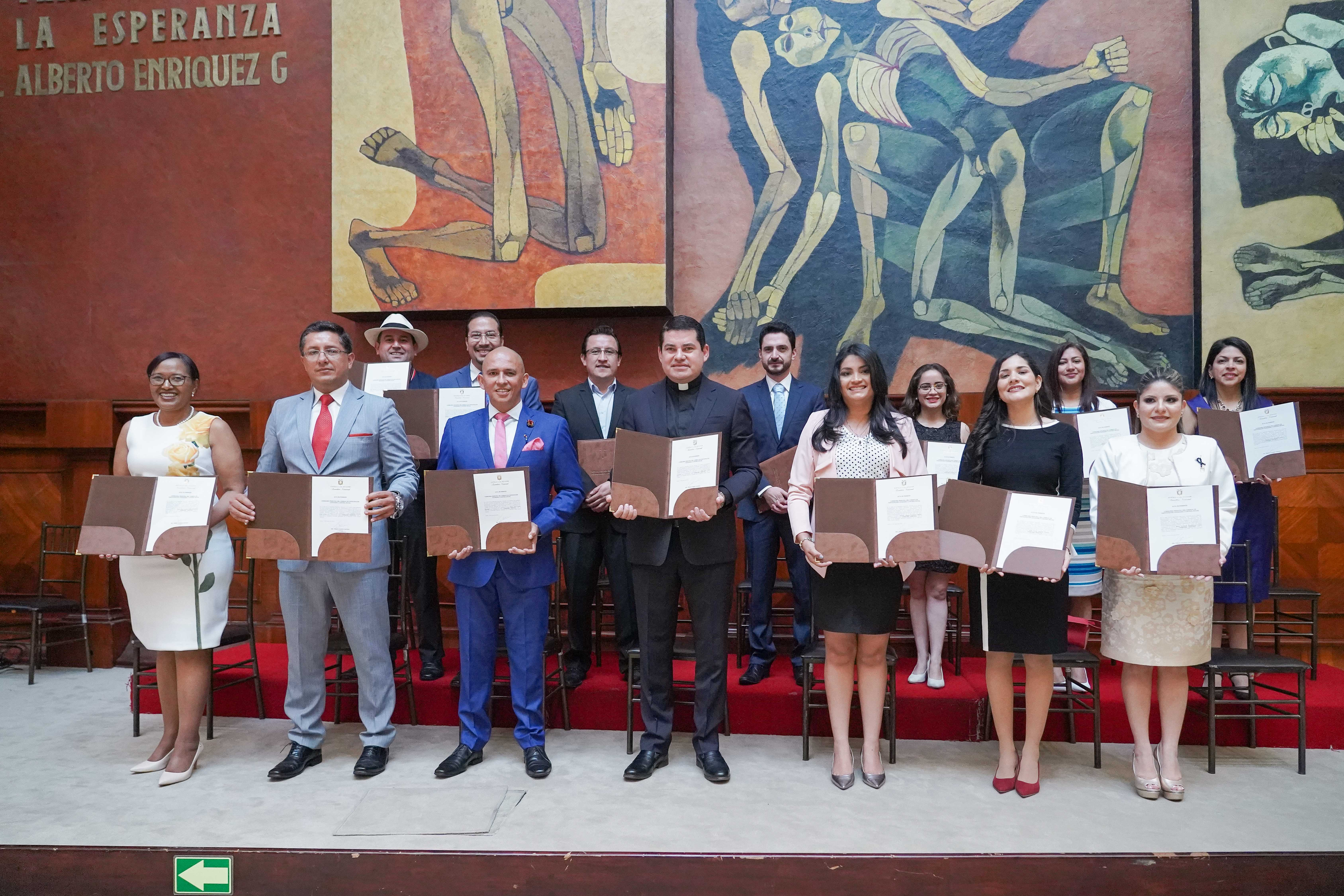
Seven new members elected in June 2019

In 2019 seven new members of the Council were elected for four years in 2019. This body's activities includes the recognition of 150 national heroes. The members elected were Victoria Desintonio, María Fernanda Rivadeneira, Sofía Almeida, Rosa Chalá, José Carlos Tuárez, Walter Gómez and Christian Cruz. The announcement in May 2019 had taken 54 days and six candidates had been excluded for irregularities.

In August 2019 the National Assembly were annoyed that members of the council had behaved unconstitutionally and they had four members removed. After a vote in which 84 members voted in favour, José Tuárez, Rosa Chalá, Walter Gomez Ronquillo and Victoria Desintonio were censored and dismissed from the council. Victoria Desintonio would later be elected as a member of the assembly.

Cristian Cruz became the new president with Sofia Almeida as vice-president on 20 August 2019. Cruz was removed in the following October when Almeida became president.

On the 9 February 2022 Hernán Ulloa replaced Sofia Almeida as president of the council after the majority of councillors decided Ulloa was president. A month later the new council had failed to make any appointments. The other members were David Rosero, Javier Dávalos, María Fernanda Rivadeneira, Francisco Bravo and Ibeth Estupiñán.
