= National Electoral Council (Ecuador) =

Government agency organising elections in Ecuador

- Consejo Nacional Electoral

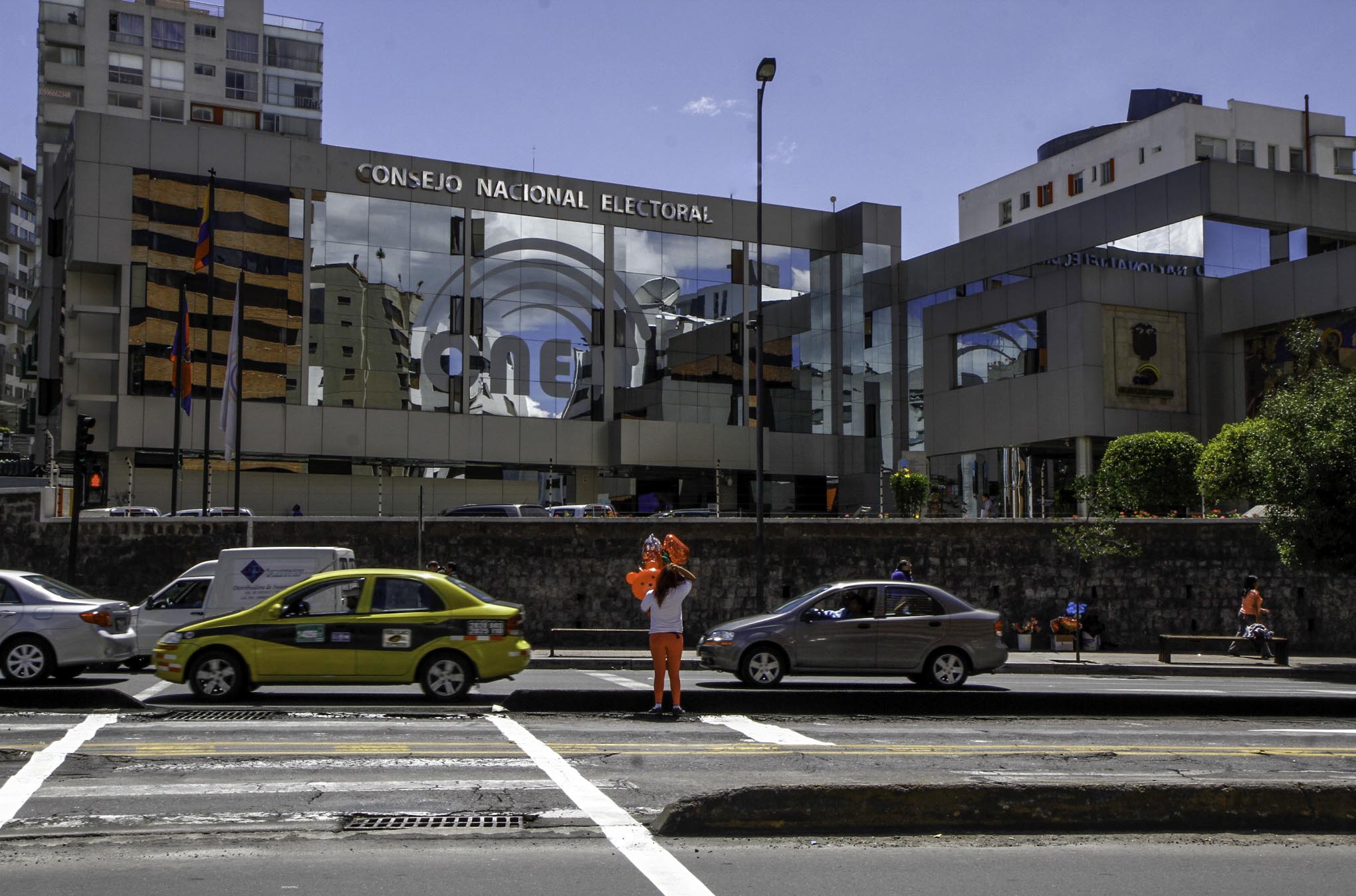
- CNE headquarters, Quito
- Abbreviation: CNE
- Predecessor: Tribunal Supremo Electoral
- Formation: 24 October 2008; 18 years ago
- Founder: 2008 Constitution of Ecuador
- Type: Government agency
- Headquarters: Av. 6 de Diciembre
- Location: Quito, Ecuador
- President: Diana Atamaint
- Vice-President: Enrique Pita García
- Three additional council members: José Cabrera Zurita, Esthela Acero Lanchimba, Elena Nájera
- Website: https://cne.gob.ec/

The National Electoral Council (Spanish: Consejo Nacional Electoral, CNE) is the government agency responsible for organising elections in Ecuador. It was established by Articles 218 and 219 of the 2008 constitution to replace the Supreme Electoral Court (Tribunal Supremo Electoral, TSE).

It is composed of five council members who serve six-year terms. As of 2023, its president is Diana Atamaint.

== History ==
Since 1945, Ecuador has had an independent electoral body whose appointments were influenced by the National Congress. This body, the Supreme Electoral Tribunal (TSE), was responsible for the country's electoral processes. However, it faced serious difficulties starting in 2003 under Lucio Gutiérrez, with changes to the TSE's board made by legislative majorities that ultimately led to Jorge Acosta of the Patriotic Society party becoming president of the organization. As president, he would be one of the key figures in the 2007 legislative crisis, in which a power struggle between the TSE and Congress led to the removal of the legislators involved in the "packaging plant" scandal and a new referendum that resulted in the convening of a Constituent Assembly.

The new Constitution created two new bodies to replace the TSE: the Contentious Tribunal and the National Electoral Council. Following the approval of the new Constitution, the Constituent Assembly elected and swore in the new councilors on October 24, 2008: Omar Simon, Carlos Cortez, Manuela Cobacango, Fausto Camacho, and Marcia Caicedo. The first two would serve as president and vice president, respectively, of the new Transitional National Electoral Council (CNE).
