= Opinion polling for the 2025 Ecuadorian general election =

In the run up to the 2025 Ecuadorian general election, various organisations carried out opinion polling to gauge voting intention in Ecuador. Results of such polls are displayed in this article.

The date range for these opinion polls are from 2024, almost a year into incumbent President Daniel Noboa's term to the day the run-off election, which was held on 13 April 2025. The data range also includes opinion polls conducted prior to the first round of voting, which was held 9 February 2025 and before official candidates were finalized.

== Opinion polling ==
Poll results are listed in the table below in reverse chronological order, showing the most recent first. The highest percentage figure in each polling survey is displayed in bold, and the background shaded in the leading party's colour.

=== Run-off ===
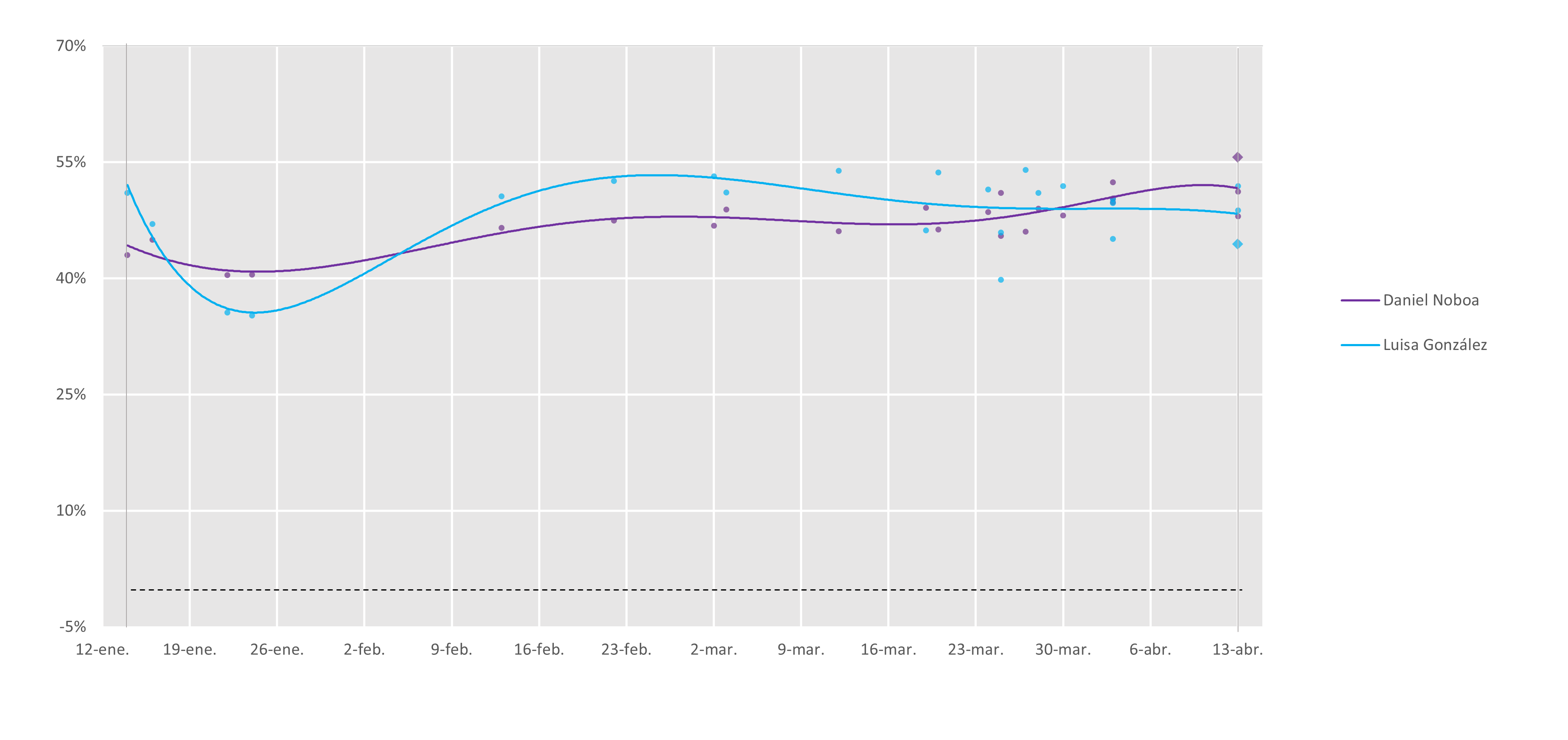

Date	Polling source	Sample size	Margin of error (+/-)	Daniel Noboa (ADN)	Luisa González (RC)	Null	Blank	Undecided	Lead
3 Apr 2025	Comunicaliza	4,763	1.42%	**41.5%**	41.1%	8.0%		9.5%	**0.4**
3 Apr 2025	Telcodata	6,134	3%	49.8%	**50.2%**	–			**0.4**
3 Apr 2025	Tino Electoral	1,500	2%	**52.4%**	45.1%	2.5%			**7.3**
1 Apr 2025	TresPuntoZero	1,180	2.9%	45.1%	**50.6%**	4.1%		0.2%	**5.5**
25–30 Mar 2025	Pedro Cango	5,422	1.5%	48.1%	**51.9%**	–			**3.8**
28 Mar 2025	Áltica	700	3.7%	42.3%	**44.1%**	6.4%		7.2%	**1.8**
27 Mar 2025	MR Analitica	6,024	1.5%	42.98%	**50.39%**	6.63%		–	**7.41**
25 Mar 2025	Tino Electoral	800	2%	**51.0%**	45.9%	3.1%			**5.1**
24 Mar 2025	Negocios y Estrategias	3,000	3%	48.55%	**51.45%**	–			**2.9**
23 Mar 2025	Run-off debate								
3–20 Mar 2025	MR Analitica	15,003	1.5%	43.10%	**49.97%**	6.92%			**6.87**
19 Mar 2025	Tino Electoral	1,500	2%	**49.1%**	46.2%	4.7%			**2.9**
9–12 Mar 2025	TresPuntoZero	1,500	2.5%	45.2%	**52.9%**	0.3%		1.6%	**7.7**
26 Feb–3 Mar 2025	Negocios y Estrategias	1,800	2.3%	44.78%	**46.78%**	8.44%			**2.00**
25 Feb–2 Mar 2025	MR Analitica	5,143	1.5%	43.79%	**49.75%**	6.46%		–	**5.96**
14–22 Feb 2025	MR Analítica	10,005	1.5%	43.24%	**47.91%**	8.85%		–	**4.67**
11–13 Feb 2025	TresPuntoZero	1,000	3.2%	46.5%	**50.6%**	1.7%		1.2%	**4.1**
9 Feb 2025	First round								
24 Jan 2025	Comunicaliza	5,217	1.36%	**40.5%**	35.2%	13.6%		10.7%	**5.3**
22 Jan 2025	Comunicaliza	2,782	1.86%	**40.4%**	35.6%	13.3%		10.8%	**4.8**
16 Jan 2025	Politiks Studio	1,200	3.1%	45%	**47%**	6%		2%	**2**
14 Jan 2025	TresPuntoZero	1,050	3%	43.0%	**51.0%**	2.7%		3.3%	**8.0**

=== First round ===
Opinion polls conducted since the 2023 election are listed below. Results for candidates in first place are in bold and have their party color as a background. Results for candidates who would make it to a second round (if the first-placed candidate would not reach either 50% or 40% with a 10-point lead) are also in bold.

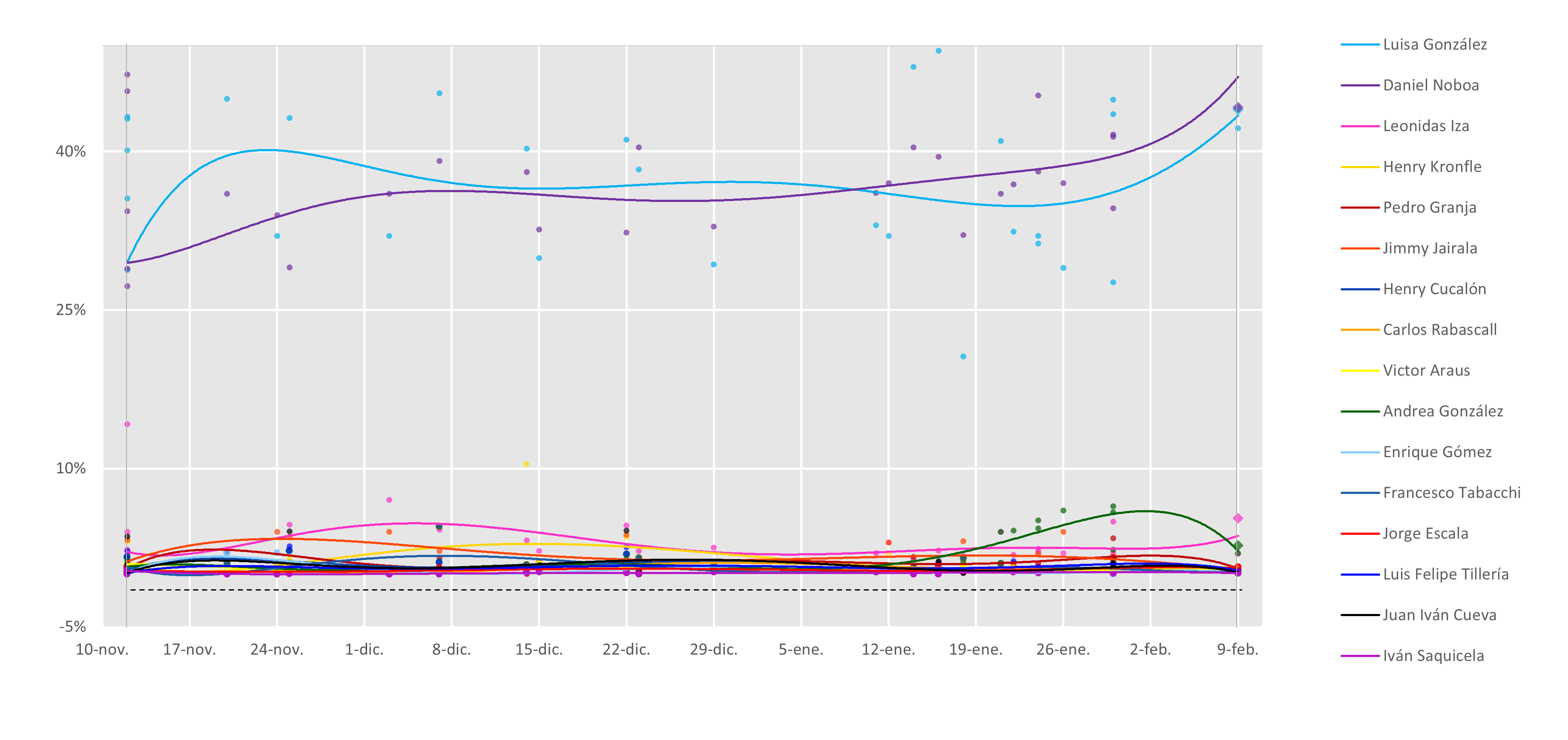

Date	Polling source	Sample size	Margin of error	Luisa González (RC)	Daniel Noboa (ADN)	Leonidas Iza (MUPP)	Henry Kronfle (PSC)	Pedro Granja (PSE)	Jimmy Jairala (MCD)	Henry Cucalón (MC25)	Carlos Rabascall (ID)	Victor Araus (PID)	Andrea González (PSP)	Enrique Gómez (SUMA)	Francesco Tabacchi (CREO)	Jorge Escala (UP)	Luis Tillería (Avanza)	Juan Cueva' (AMIGO)	Iván Saquicela (DSí)	Null	Blank	Undecided
**The second round of the election between Luisa González and Daniel Noboa is scheduled for 13 April 2025.**
12 March 2025	**CNE Final Presidential results**	11,264,435	0.03%	**44%**	**44.17%**																	
18 Feb 2025	^{Consejo Nacional Electoral Preliminary Results}	11,264,435	^{Available by 22 March 2025}	**43.97%**	**44.17%**	**5.25%**	**0.72%**	**0.53%**	**0.4%**	**0.36%**	**0.22%**	**0.25%**	**2.69%**	**0.18%**	**0.26%**	**0.4%**	**0.32%**	**0.17%**	**0.12%**	**6.8%**	**2.16**	**Nill**
9 Feb 2025 ^{5 p.m. (ECT)}	^{Diego Tello Flores Official Exit Poll "on behalf of Estrategas"}	28,220	2.98%	**42.21%**	**50.12%**	1.89%	0.70%	0.52%	0.42%	0.18%	0.16%	0.28%	1.98%	0.13%	0.16%	0.66%	0.41%	0.11%	0.06%	Nill		
30 Jan 2025	Negocios y Estrategias	2,000	2.2%	**48.5%**	**44.9%**	6.6%														–		–
30 Jan 2025	Negocios y Estrategias	2,000	2.2%	**44.9%**	**41.6%**	2.0%	0.3%	0.3%	0.3%	0.3%	0.2%	0.0%	2.3%	0.0%	0.2%	0.2%	0.2%	0.2%	0.1%	7.4%		–
30 Jan 2025	Cedatos	3,650	2.2%	**32.2%**	**48.6%**																	
30 Jan 2025	Cedatos	3,650	2.2%	**27.6%**	**41.4%**	1.1%	0.6%	1.4%	1.7%	0.3%	0.6%	0.8%	6.4%	0.0%	1.0%	0.3%	1.5%	0.9%	0.4%	9.3%	2.4%	2.5%
26 Jan 2025	Informe Confidencial	2,630	3%	**29%**	**37%**	2%	–		4%	–			6%	–						12%	5%	
26 Jan 2025	Informe Confidencial	2,630	3%	**34.9%**	**44.6%**	2.4%	–		4.8%	–			7.2%	–						–		
24 Jan 2025	Ipsos	2,000	2.2%	**31.3**%	**45.3%**	2.4%	–		1.9%	–			5.1%	–						6.3%		2.9%
24 Jan 2025	Ipsos	2,000	2.2%	**34.6**%	**50.0%**	2.6%	–		2.1%	–			5.7%	–						–		
24 Jan 2025	Communicaliza	5,217	1.36%	**32.0%**	**38.1%**	2.1%	0.2%	1.0%	0.8%	0.3%	0.4%	0.2%	4.3%	0.2%	0.3%	0.1%	0.7%	0.1%	0.1%	7.6%		11.5%
24 Jan 2025	Communicaliza	5,217	1.36%	**39.5%**	**47.1%**	2.5%	–						5.3%	–						–		
22 Jan 2025	Communicaliza	2,782	1.86%	**32.4%**	**36.9%**	1.8%	0.3%	1.0%	0.8%	0.3%	0.6%	0.2%	4.1%	0.2%	0.3%	0.2%	1.2%	0.2%	0.2%	7.8%		11.4%
22 Jan 2025	Communicaliza	2,782	1.86%	**40.1%**	**45.7%**	14.2%														–		
22 Jan 2025	MR Analitica	2,010	–	**42.20%**	**32.42%**	4.88%	1.05%	4.46%	1.57%	0.73%	0.88%	0.07%	4.72%	0.37%	0.14%	3.15%	0.72%	1.15%	0.05%	–		
22 Jan 2025	MR Analitica	2,010	–	**39.70%**	**30.50%**	4.10%	0.88%	3.75%	1.32%	0.62%	0.74%	0.06%	3.97%	0.31%	0.12%	2.65%	0.60%	0.97%	0.04%	5.92		–
21 Jan 2025	Negocios y Estrategias	2,000	2.2%	**41%**	**36%**	4%	1%	1%	1%	1%	1%	0%	4%	0%	1%	0%	0%	0%	0%	9%		–
19 Jan 2025	First round debate																					
18 Jan 2025	Cedatos	3,651	2.2%	**29.6**%	**32.1%**	1.7%	0.9%	0.7%	3.1%	0.6%	0.4%	0.8%	1.2%	0.2%	1.5%	0.2%	0.2%	0.1%	0.3%	15.9%	3.2%	16.3%
18 Jan 2025	Cedatos	3,651	2.2%	**31.9**%	**49.7%**	2.6%	1.4%	1.1%	4.8%	0.9%	0.6%	1.2%	1.9%	0.3%	2.3%	0.3%	0.3%	0.2%	0.5%	–		
16 Jan 2025	MR Analitica	3,950	2.5%	**49.55%**	**39.52**%	2.24%	0.39%	1.14%	1.05%	0.85%	0.17%	0.25%	0.62%	0.07%	0.11%	0.87%	1.05%	1.20%	0.00%	–		
16 Jan 2025	MR Analitica	3,950	2.5%	**43.09%**	**34.37%**	1.82%	0.31%	0.92%	0.85%	0.69%	0.14%	0.21%	0.50%	0.06%	0.09%	0.71%	0.85%	0.97%	0.00%	13.04%		–
16 Jan 2025	Politiks Studio	1,200	3.1%	**44%**	**38%**	0%	2%	2%	–	1%	0%	1%	0%	1%	0%	–				6%	–	
14 Jan 2025	Trespuntozero	1,050	3.0%	**48.0%**	**40.4%**	1.4%	0.1%	1.6%	1.1%	0.2%	0.9%	0.1%	0.6%	1.0%	0.1%	0.1%	0.2%	0.7%	0.00%	–		1.5%
12 Jan 2025	Informe Confidencial	13,000	3.0%	**32%**	**37%**	3%	2%	–	3%	–										13%	7%	–
11 Jan 2025	Comunicaliza	5,251	1.4%	**33.0%**	**36.1%**	2.0%	0.3%	0.7%	0.7%	0.5%	0.6%	0.5%	0.4%	0.2%	0.3%	0.4%	0.3%	0.2%	0.2%	9.9%		13.9%
11 Jan 2025	Comunicaliza	5,251	1.4%	**43.3%**	**47.3%**	9.4%														–		
8 Jan 2025	Negocios y Estrategias	1,300	2.7%	**40%**	**34%**	4%	1%	1%	3%	2%	1%	0%	0%	0%	1%	0%	0%	0%	0%	12%		–
29 Dec 2024	Comunicaliza	4,485	1.5%	**29.3%**	**32.9%**	2.5%	0.6%	1.0%	1.1%	1.0%	1.1%	0.5%	0.8%	0.5%	0.3%	0.5%	0.5%	0.4%	0.2%	8.9%		17.8%
22 Dec 2024	MR Analitica	9,000	2.0%	**41.14%**	**32.32%**	4.60%	3.53%	1.96%	3.72%	1.86%	0.98%	0.39%	1.47%	0.20%	0.29%	0.78%	2.55%	4.11%	0.10%	–		
22 Dec 2024	MR Analitica	9,000	2.0%	**35.56%**	**27.24%**	3.98%	3.05%	1.69%	3.22%	1.61%	0.85%	0.34%	1.27%	0.17%	0.25%	0.68%	2.20%	3.56%	0.08%	13.55%		
20 Dec 2024	Cedatos	3,444	2.4%	**32.5**%	**48.0%**	2.3%	1.6%	0.3%	4.8%	0.3%	0.5%	1.5%	2.1%	0.6%	4.2%	0.6%	–	0.3%	0.3%	–		
20 Dec 2024	Cedatos	3,444	2.4%	**20.1%**	**29.7%**	1.4%	1.0%	0.2%	3.0%	0.2%	0.3%	0.9%	1.3%	0.4%	2.6%	0.4%	–	0.2%	0.2%	19.7%	3.7%	14.6%
15 Dec 2024	Comunicaliza	4,486	1.5%	**29.9%**	**32.6%**	2.2%	0.4%	0.6%	1.2%	1.0%	1.0%	0.9%	0.8%	0.5%	0.8%	0.4%	0.3%	0.5%	0.2%	10.4%		16.3%
14 Dec 2024	Bitar Consultores	10,269	0.03%	**40.28%**	**38.05%**	3.21%	10.38%	0.76%	1.81%	0.59%	0.51%	0.86%	0.64%	0.57%	0.87%	0.38%	0.33%	0.62%	0.12%	–		
7 Dec 2024	Áltica	1,000	3.1%	**45.5%**	**39.1%**	4.2%	0.4%	1.5%	2.2%	1.1%	–		0.5%	–	4.5%	0.6%	0.4%	–		–		
3 Dec 2024	Tino Electoral	4,000	–	**32%**	**36%**	7%	–		4%	–										13%	8%	–
25 Nov 2024	MR Analitica	4,667	2%	**43.17%**	**29.2**%	4.70%	1.42%	2.25%	3.53%	2.21%	0.56%	0.60%	1.11%	0.31%	0.32%	0.75%	2.61%	4.05%	0.02%	–		
25 Nov 2024	MR Analitica	4,667	2%	**37.74%**	**25.37**%	4.11%	1.24%	1.97%	3.08%	1.93%	0.49%	0.53%	0.97%	0.27%	0.28%	0.65%	2.29%	3.64%	0.02%	12.58%		–
24 Nov 2024	Informe Confidencial	2,930	3%	**32%**	**34%**	2%	1%	–	4%	–				2%	–					15%	6%	–
20 Nov 2024	Negocios y Estrategias	1,250	2.8%	**45%**	**36%**	2%	1%	2%	2%	2%	1%	1%	1%	2%	1%	0%	0%	0%	0%	–		
20 Nov 2024	Negocios y Estrategias	1,250	2.8%	**39%**	**31%**	2%	1%	2%	2%	2%	1%	1%	1%	2%	1%	0%	0%	0%	0%	14%		–
12 Nov 2024	Comunicaliza	4,196	1.51%	**28.8%**	**28.9%**	2.3%	0.6%	0.6%	1.4%	0.3%	0.7%	0.9%	0.6%	–	0.5%	0.3%	0.2%	0.3%	0.3%	12.6%		20.3%

=== Pre-candidates ===
Date	Polling source	Sample size	Margin of error	Daniel Noboa (ADN)	Luisa González (RC)	Gustavo Jalkh (RC)	Pedro Granja (PSE)	Leonidas Iza (MUPP)	Jan Topić (SUMA)	Pedro Freile (SUMA)	Henry Kronfle (PSC)	Carlos Rabascall (ID)	Andrea González (PSP)	Victor Araus (PID)	Jorge Escala (UP)	Henry Cucalón (MC25)	José Serrano (MCD)	Luis Tillería (Avanza)	Bolívar Armijos (AMIGO)	Cristina Reyes (Ind.)	Diana Salazar (Ind.)	Others	Null	Blank	Undecided
27 Sep 2024	CID Gallup	1,200	2.8%	31%	**26%**	–	–	–	15%	–	1%	–	–	–	–	2%	–	–	–	–	–	4%	21%		
22 Sep 2024	Informe Confidential	–	–	29%	**25%**	–	–	3%	7%	–	2%	1%	–	–	–	–	–	–	–	–	–	6%	17%	10%	
24 Aug 2024	Cedatos	3,238	3.1%	48.6%	**27.6%**	–	1.3%	5.3%	7.7%	–	1.6%	1,5%	0.9%	0.9%	0.2%	1.1%	0.3%	1.1%	–	–	–	2,0%	–	–	–
19 Aug 2024	Negocios y Estrategias	–	–	37%	**41%**	–	1%	2%	8%	–	0%	1%	–	–	–	1%	1%	–	–	–	–	–	9.9%		–
18 Aug 2024	Communicaliza	4,971	1.39%	32.4%	**25.4%**	–	1.2%	2.6%	6.3%	–	1.4%	0,8%	0.7%	0.5%	0.4%	0.5%	2.2%	0.4%	–	–	–	0,9%	9.9%		14.3%
5 Aug 2024	Maluk Research	4,052	2.5%	25.27%	**39.67%**	–	3.86%	4.45%	–	2.57%	–	1,83%	2.50%	–	2.81%	2.95%	–	6.48%	–	–	3.16%	4.44%	–	–	–
5 Aug 2024	Maluk Research	4,052	2.5%	22.83%	–	**26.93%**	5.75%	5.83%	–	3.70%	–	4,41%	3.07%	–	2.20%	4.72%	–	12.60%	–	–	3.07%	4.88%	7.03%	–	–
17 Jul 2024	Maluk Research	4,793	2.5%	34.61%	**40.11%**	–	3.90%	4.07%	–	–	0.48%	–	3.10%	–	4.65%	1.74%	–	–	–	–	1.94%	5.39%	–	–	–
4 Jul 2024	Cedatos	3,882	2.4%	35.2%	**11.7%**	–	–	3.4%	–	–	4.0%	–	5.9%	–	–	7.0%	–	–	–	–	–	2.0%	14.9%	3.6%	12.3%
4 Jul 2024	Cedatos	3,882	2.4%	36.6%	–	3.80%	–	3.5%	–	–	4.3%	–	5.4%	–	–	7.6%	–	–	–	–	–	11.4%	15.1%	4.4%	7.8%
28 Jun 2024	Maluk Research	4,412	2.5%	32.49%	**39.63%**	–	5.21%	4.89%	–	–	1.16%	–	3.69%	–	1.04%	–	1.72%	–	–	–	2.73%	7.42%	–	–	–
13 Jun 2024	Maluk Research	4,012	2.5%	32.37%	**43.22%**	–	4.98%	4.85%	–	–	1.02%	–	3.01%	–	1.18%	0.92%	–	–	1.33%	–	1.10%	6.03%	–	–	–
30 May 2024	Communicaliza	–	–	39.8%	**21.1%**	–	1.0%	2.3%	–	–	2.4%	1.1%	–	–	–	–	–	–	0.5%	0.8%	–	0.8%	9.8%		20.5%
14 May 2024	Maluk Research	4,012	2.5%	29.91%	**47.75%**	–	4.60%	1.89%	2.30%	–	–	2.79%	0.95%	–	–	–	–	–	0.00%	8.90%	0.37%	0.54%	–	–	–
15 Apr 2024	Maluk Research	3,635	2.5%	30.31%	**39.12%**	–	5.13%	4.20%	3.71%	–	–	3.69%	1.68%	–	–	–	–	–	0.26%	8.93%	1.02%	1.96%	–	–	–

== See also ==
- 2025 Ecuadorian general election
