= Elections in Ecuador =

Ecuador elects on the national level a president and a legislature. The President of the Republic and the Vice President are elected on one ballot for a four-year term by the people. The National Assembly (Asamblea Nacional) has 137 members elected for a four-year term in the 24 provinces from multi-member constituencies.

Ecuador has a mandatory voting system; citizens who fail to vote are fined. To facilitate universal voting, elections are always held on Sundays and seen as community events where everyone must contribute to the work of voting days.

== Presidential elections ==
Presidential elections in Ecuador are conducted every four years.

Elections use a run off system where a candidate must get over 40% of valid votes and have a minimum 10% lead over the runner up to win in only one round. This is known as winning an "absolute majority".

If no candidate meets those criteria, then the two leading candidates will run against each other in a second election that is held within 45 days off the first election. This stage is known as "Ballotage".

Whoever comes out of Ballotage with more votes will win the presidency.

== Past elections ==
=== 2025 presidential elections ===
Candidate	Running mate	Party	First round		Second round	
Candidate	Running mate	Party	Votes	%	Votes	%
Daniel Noboa	María José Pinto	National Democratic Action	4,527,606	44.17	5,870,618	55.63
Luisa González	Diego Borja	Citizen Revolution Movement–RETO	4,510,860	44.00	4,683,260	44.37
Leonidas Iza	Katiuska Molina	Pachakutik	538,456	5.25		
Andrea González	Galo Moncayo	Patriotic Society Party	275,376	2.69		
Henry Kronfle	Dallyana Passailaigue	Social Christian Party	73,293	0.71		
Pedro Granja	Verónica Silva	Socialist Party – Broad Front of Ecuador	53,940	0.53		
Jimmy Jairala	Lucía Vallecilla	Democratic Center	40,559	0.40		
Jorge Escala	Pacha Terán	Popular Unity	40,483	0.39		
Henry Cucalón	Carla Larrea	Movimiento Construye	37,316	0.36		
Luis Felipe Tillería	Karla Rosero	Avanza	33,239	0.32		
Francesco Tabacchi	Blanca Sacancela	Creating Opportunities	26,768	0.26		
Víctor Araus	Cristina Carrera	People, Equality and Democracy	22,678	0.22		
Carlos Rabascall	Alejandra Rivas	Democratic Left	22,270	0.22		
Enrique Gómez	Inés Díaz	SUMA Party	18,815	0.18		
Juan Cueva	Cristina Reyes	AMIGO Movement	17,545	0.17		
Iván Saquicela	María Luisa Coello	Democracy Yes	11,985	0.12		
Total			10,251,189	100.00	10,553,878	100.00
Valid votes			10,251,189	91.04	10,553,878	92.63
Invalid votes			765,649	6.80	763,180	6.70
Blank votes			243,573	2.16	75,956	0.67
Total votes			11,260,411	100.00	11,393,014	100.00
Registered voters/turnout			13,732,194	82.00	13,731,145	82.97
Source: CNE (first round), CNE (first round), CNE (second round), CNE (second round)

=== 2025 National Assembly elections ===
Party	National			Provincial			Overseas			Total seats	+/–
Party	Votes	%	Seats	Votes	%	Seats	Votes	%	Seats	Total seats	+/–
National Democratic Action	3,948,532	43.34	7			56			3	66	+52
Citizen Revolution Movement–RETO (Note: 66 seats won by RC, one won by RETO.)	3,764,230	41.32	7			57			3	67	+13
Social Christian Party	288,545	3.17	1			3			0	4	–10
Patriotic Society Party	210,083	2.31	0			1			0	1	–2
AMIGO Movement	162,721	1.79	0			0			0	0	–1
Popular Unity	156,802	1.72	0			1			0	1	0
SUMA Party	149,404	1.64	0			0			0	0	–4
Creating Opportunities	119,480	1.31	0			0			0	0	0
Ecuadorian Socialist Party	91,778	1.01	0			0			0	0	-1
Democratic Left	90,383	0.99	0			0			0	0	0
People, Equality and Democracy	67,367	0.74	0			0			0	0	0
Democratic Center	61,559	0.68	0			0			0	0	–1
Pachakutik						9			0	9	+5
Movimiento Construye						1			0	1	–28
Avanza						0			0	0	–3
Democracy Yes						0			0	0	0
Provincial movements						2			0	2	–4
Total	9,110,884	100.00	15			130			6	151	–
Valid votes	9,110,884	80.91									
Invalid votes	1,040,695	9.24									
Blank votes	1,109,547	9.85									
Total votes	11,261,126	100.00									
Registered voters/turnout	13,732,194	82.01									
Source: CNE

== See also ==
- 2024 national electoral calendar
