= President of Ecuador =

Head of state and government

Constitutional President of the Republic of Ecuador
- Presidente Constitucional de la República del Ecuador
- Presidential Standard

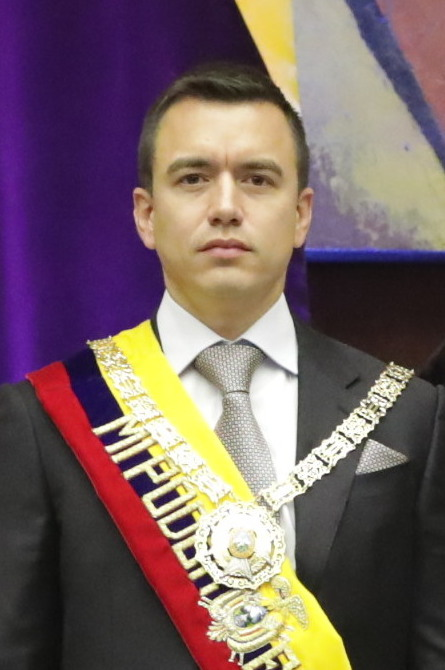
- Incumbent; Daniel Noboa since 23 November 2023
- Executive branch of the Government of Ecuador
- Style: Mr./Madam President (Señor/a Presidente/a) (informal); The Most Excellent (Excelentísimo/a Señor/a) (diplomatic); His/Her Excellency (Su Excelencia) (diplomatic)
- Type: Head of state Head of government
- Residence: Carondelet Palace
- Appointer: Direct popular election
- Term length: Four years, renewable once
- Constituting instrument: Constitution of Ecuador (2008)
- Inaugural holder: Juan José Flores
- Formation: September 22, 1830 (196 years ago)
- Deputy: Vice President of Ecuador
- Salary: 6,261 USD per month
- Website: www.presidencia.gob.ec

The president of Ecuador (Spanish: Presidente del Ecuador), officially the Constitutional President of the Republic of Ecuador (Spanish: Presidente Constitucional de la República del Ecuador), serves as the head of state and head of government of Ecuador. It is the highest political office in the country as the head of the executive branch of government. Per the current constitution adopted in 2008, the president can serve two four-year terms. Prior to that, the president could only serve one four-year term.

The current president of Ecuador is Daniel Noboa, who was first elected in 2023 and re-elected in 2025. Having been sworn in at age 35, Noboa is the second youngest president in Ecuadorian history, after Juan José Flores.

== History ==
The presidency of Ecuador has been marked by periods of instability, causing the office to change hands frequently throughout the history of the country. At least five times, presidential duties have been assumed by a provisional government or a military junta. Often, the office has been left to an interim or acting president, many of whom would go on to become president. The president who has had the most terms in office is José María Velasco Ibarra, who served five.

In May 2017 Rafael Correa became the first President in over two decades to complete his terms in office since Sixto Durán Ballén, who served from 1992 to 1996. Before Correa, a period of deep political instability from 1997 to 2007 also saw a grave economic crisis in 1998–2000. During this time, Durán Ballén's three elected successors, Abdalá Bucaram, Jamil Mahuad and Lucio Gutiérrez, were deposed in popular revolts, followed by military or legislative coups d'état, in 1997, 2000, and 2005, respectively. Since Correa, Lenín Moreno had also completed a full, four-year term (2017–2021), despite a large 2019 popular revolt that nearly toppled his government.

== Latest election ==
Candidate	Running mate	Party	First round		Second round	
Candidate	Running mate	Party	Votes	%	Votes	%
Daniel Noboa	María José Pinto	National Democratic Action	4,527,606	44.17	5,870,618	55.63
Luisa González	Diego Borja	Citizen Revolution Movement–RETO	4,510,860	44.00	4,683,260	44.37
Leonidas Iza	Katiuska Molina	Pachakutik	538,456	5.25		
Andrea González	Galo Moncayo	Patriotic Society Party	275,376	2.69		
Henry Kronfle	Dallyana Passailaigue	Social Christian Party	73,293	0.71		
Pedro Granja	Verónica Silva	Socialist Party – Broad Front of Ecuador	53,940	0.53		
Jimmy Jairala	Lucía Vallecilla	Democratic Center	40,559	0.40		
Jorge Escala	Pacha Terán	Popular Unity	40,483	0.39		
Henry Cucalón	Carla Larrea	Movimiento Construye	37,316	0.36		
Luis Felipe Tillería	Karla Rosero	Avanza	33,239	0.32		
Francesco Tabacchi	Blanca Sacancela	Creating Opportunities	26,768	0.26		
Víctor Araus	Cristina Carrera	People, Equality and Democracy	22,678	0.22		
Carlos Rabascall	Alejandra Rivas	Democratic Left	22,270	0.22		
Enrique Gómez	Inés Díaz	SUMA Party	18,815	0.18		
Juan Cueva	Cristina Reyes	AMIGO Movement	17,545	0.17		
Iván Saquicela	María Luisa Coello	Democracy Yes	11,985	0.12		
Total			10,251,189	100.00	10,553,878	100.00
Valid votes			10,251,189	91.04	10,553,878	92.63
Invalid votes			765,649	6.80	763,180	6.70
Blank votes			243,573	2.16	75,956	0.67
Total votes			11,260,411	100.00	11,393,014	100.00
Registered voters/turnout			13,732,194	82.00	13,731,145	82.97
Source: CNE (first round), CNE (first round), CNE (second round), CNE (second round)

== See also ==
- Politics of Ecuador
- List of presidents of Ecuador
- Vice President of Ecuador
