= 2025 Ecuadorian general election =

- 9 February 2025; 13 April 2025 (runoff)
- Presidential election
- Opinion polls
- Turnout: 82% (first round); 82.97% (second round)
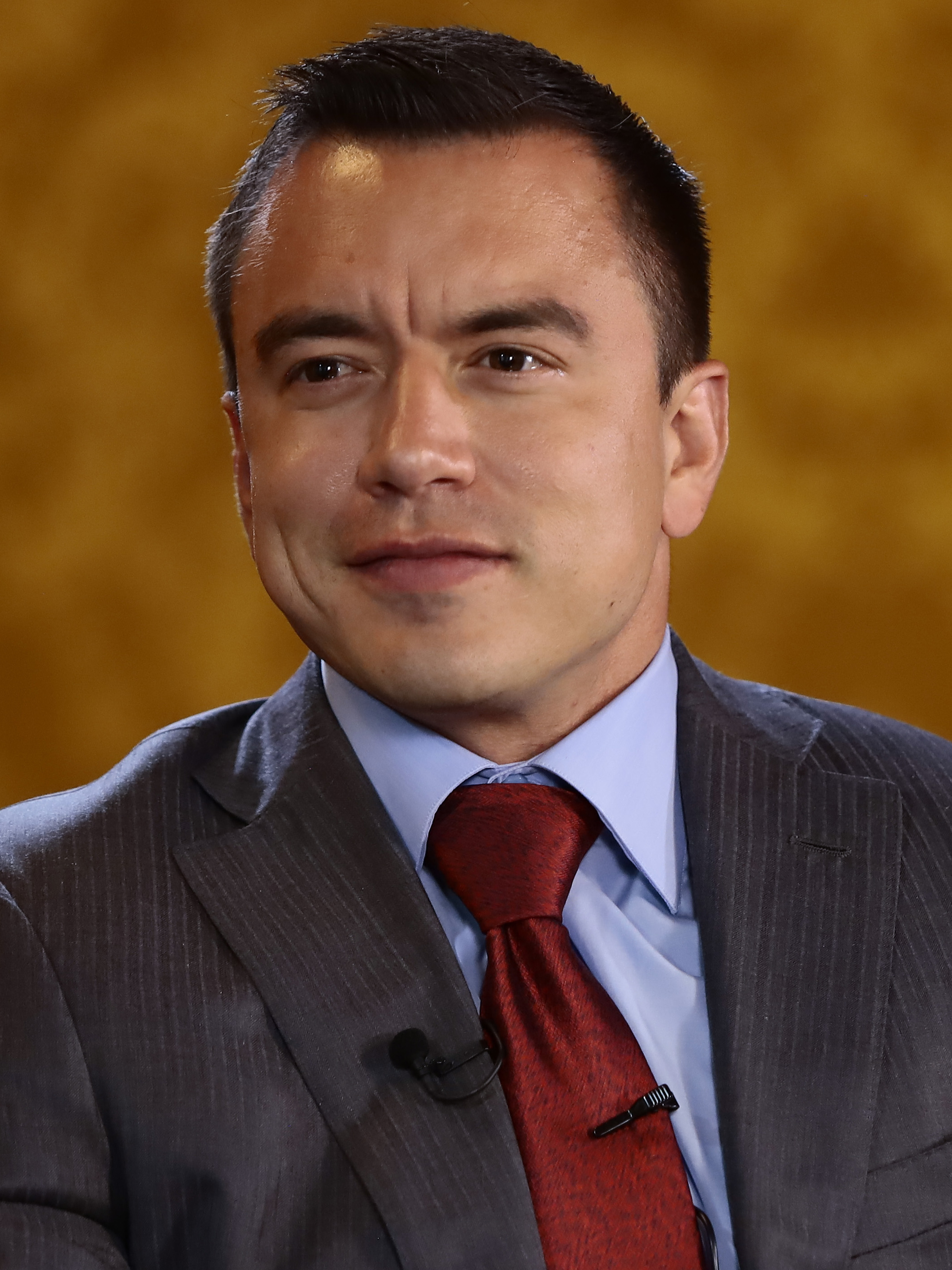

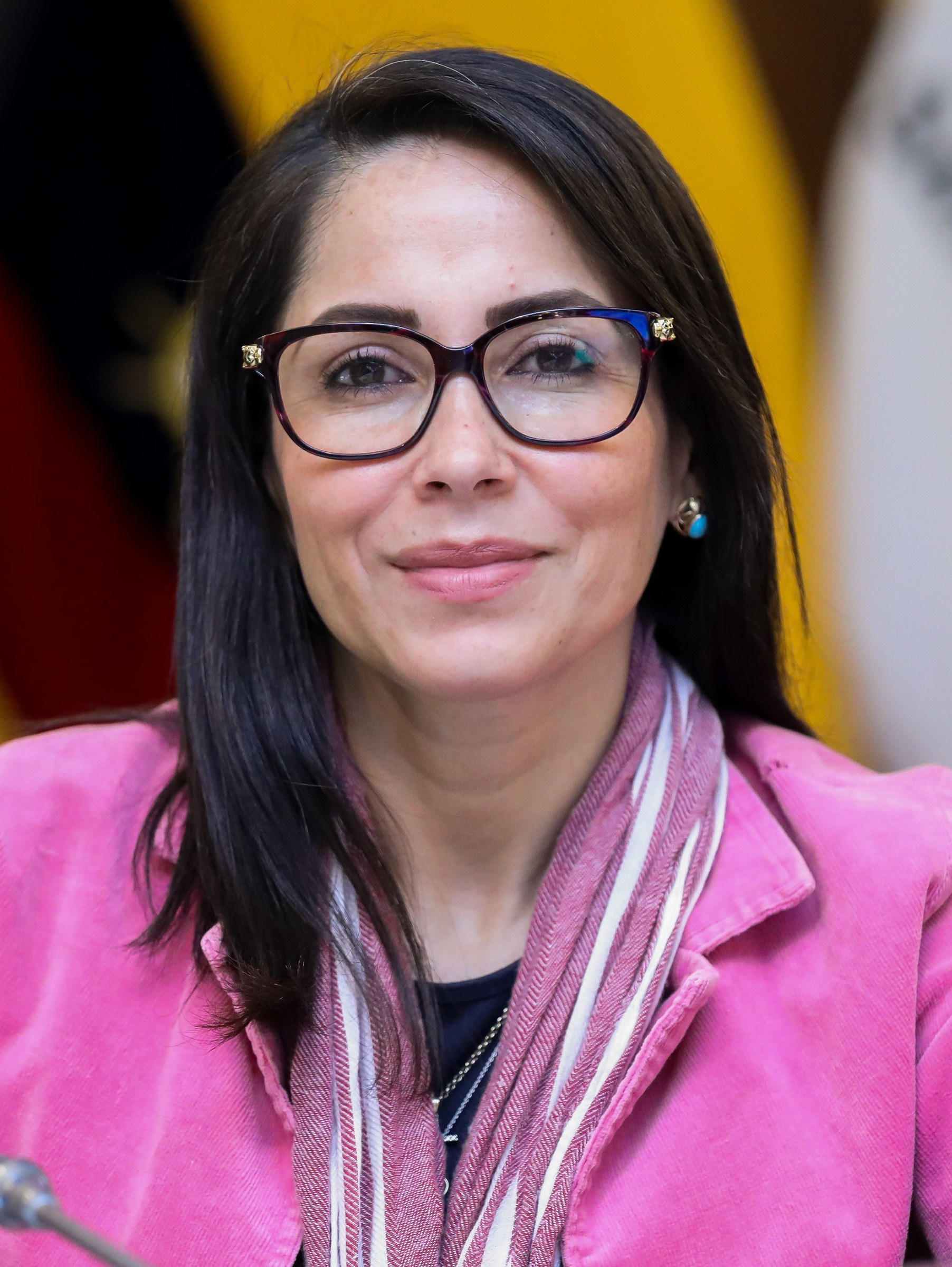
Candidate	Daniel Noboa	Luisa González
Party	ADN	RC
Running mate	María José Pinto	Diego Borja
Votes	5,870,618	4,683,260
Percentage	55.63%	44.37%
President before election
Daniel Noboa
ADN
Elected President
Daniel Noboa
ADN
- Parliamentary election
- All 151 seats in the National Assembly; 76 seats needed for a majority
- Turnout: 82.01%
Party	Leader	Vote %	Seats	+/–
RC-RETO	Rafael Correa	41.32	67	+13
ADN	Daniel Noboa	43.34	66	+52
MUPP	Guillermo Churuchumbi	–	9	+5
PSC	Jaime Nebot	3.17	4	−10
PSP	Lucio Gutierrez	2.31	1	0
UP	Geovanni Atarihuana	1.72	1	−2
MC25	María Paula Romo	–	1	−28
Local lists	–	–	2	−4
This lists parties that won seats. See the complete results below.
Results by constituency
National Assembly President before	National Assembly President after
Viviana Veloz; RC	Niels Olsen Peet; ADN

General elections were held in Ecuador on 9 February 2025 for the presidency, the National Assembly, the 21 provincial assemblies, and Ecuador's representatives to the Andean Parliament. Voter turnout was approximately 82% and 83%, in the first and second rounds respectively.

In the presidential election, no candidate secured an outright majority in the first round, a run-off was conducted on 13 April 2025. Incumbent President Daniel Noboa was re-elected for a full term, defeating Luisa González of the Citizen Revolution Movement in the second round. This face-off was a re-match of the 2023 election.

In the National Assembly elections, the left leaning block formed by González's Citizen Revolution Movement and the RETO Movement (led by former President Rafael Correa), secured a narrow plurality in the National Assembly with 67 seats, followed closely by Noboa's National Democratic Action party with 66 seats.

In the first round, Noboa received 44.17% of the vote, slightly ahead of González, who received 44%. On 12 April 2025, a state of emergency was declared leading up to the second round. In the second round, Noboa received 55.63% of the vote, defeating González by 11.25 percentage points. The result exceeded expectations, with Noboa's campaign notable for its focus on young voters. González demanded a recount, claiming the results had discrepancies with pre-election polls and exit polls and were fraudulent. Several media outlets said that González's claims of fraud lacked evidence. International observers, including the European Union and the Organization of American States, determined the elections were free and fair, rejecting claims of fraud.

== Background ==
The 2025 election was held after an early election in 2023 after former President Guillermo Lasso invoked the 'muerte cruzada', just days before a congressional impeachment vote. That constitutional mechanism dissolved the National Assembly and triggered a snap election. In that election, Daniel Noboa was elected to complete Lasso's unfinished term, which runs until May 2025.

The 2025 election saw Ecuador returning to its regular electoral schedule to determine the president and vice president for a full four-year term, alongside members of the National Assembly.

== Electoral system ==
The president is elected using a modified two-round system, with a candidate required to get over 50% of the vote, or get over 40% of the vote and be 10 points ahead of their nearest rival, to be elected in the first round. The president is limited to two consecutive four-year terms. However, Noboa is serving the remaining term of Guillermo Lasso, whose invoking of muerte cruzada called for the 2023 snap general elections and his early conclusion of his presidency.

Members of the National Assembly are elected by three methods. Fifteen are elected by closed list proportional representation in a nationwide constituency. Six are elected by overseas voters (two each from Canada/United States, Latin America and Asia/Europe/Oceania). The remaining 116 members are elected from multi-member constituencies by closed list proportional representation, with all seats allocated using the Webster method. Members of the National Assembly are limited to two four-year terms, regardless if they are consecutive or not. There are gender quotas for the party lists, meaning there is alternation between men and women. There are no quotas for minority representation.

== Presidential candidates ==
=== Advanced to run-off ===
Name	Born	Experience	Home province	Running mate	Campaign	Ref
Luisa González	22 November 1977 (age 47); Quito, Pichincha	President of the Citizen Revolution Movement (2023–2026); Member of the National Assembly (2021–2023); Secretary of Public Administration (2017); 2023 presidential candidate	Manabí	Diego Borja	Nominee of the: Citizen Revolution Announced: 29 February 2024; Nominated: 10 August 2024	
Daniel Noboa	30 November 1987 (age 37); Miami, Florida, U.S.	48th President of Ecuador (2023–present); Member of the National Assembly (2021–2023)	Santa Elena	María José Pinto	Nominee of the: ADN (Note: Alliance is composed of National Democratic Action and Mover) Announced: 23 May 2024	

=== Eliminated in first round ===
The following candidates have officially submitted their candidacy through the CNE and were eliminated in the first round of voting:

Name	Born	Experience	Home province	Campaign	Ref
Jimmy Jairala	26 September 1957 (age 67); Guayaquil, Guayas	Leader of the Democratic Center (2012–present); Prefect of Guayas Province (2009–2018); Member of the National Congress (2007)	Guayas	Nominated by: MCD nomination Announced: 31 July 2024	
Jorge Escala	8 January 1970 (age 55); Ventanas, Los Ríos	Member of the National Assembly (2009–2013)	Los Ríos	Nominated by: Popular Unity Announced: 18 May 2024	
Andrea González Náder	1 April 1987 (age 37); Guayaquil, Guayas	Environmental activist 2023 vice presidential candidate	Guayas	Nominated by: PSP Announced: 10 June 2024	
Henry Kronfle	1972 (age 52–53); Guayaquil, Guayas	President of the National Assembly (2023–present); Member of the National Assembly (2017–present)	Pichincha	Nominated by: PSC nomination Announced: 7 August 2024	
Carlos Rabascall	3 September 1960 (age 64); Guayaquil, Guayas	Businessman; 2021 vice presidential candidate	Guayas	Nominated by: ID nomination Announced: 24 July 2024	
Leonidas Iza	18 June 1982 (age 42); Latacunga, Cotopaxi	President of CONAIE (2021–present)	Cotopaxi	Nominated by: Pachakutik nomination Announced: 29 February 2024	
Iván Saquicela	13 March 1975 (age 49); Cuenca, Azuay	President of the National Court of Justice (2021–2024)	Azuay	Nominated by: Democracy Yes Announced: 13 August 2024	
Francesco Tabacchi	8 June 1971 (age 53); Guayaquil, Guayas	Governor of Guayas (2023)	Guayas	Nominated by: CREO Announced: 17 August 2024	
Henry Cucalón	8 June 1973 (age 51); Guayaquil, Guayas	Minister of the Government (2023); Member of the National Assembly (2013–2021)	Guayas	Nominated by: MC25 nomination Announced: 2 July 2024	

==== Minor candidates ====
The following pre-candidates were selected in the primaries of the national parties and were eligible for inscription but were not notable enough due to lack of coverage or not being present in a national opinion poll:

- Víctor Araus (People, Equality and Democracy), former General of the National Police of Ecuador
- Juan Iván Cueva (AMIGO), businessman
- Pedro Granja (PSE), criminal lawyer
- Eduardo Sánchez (RETO), businessman
- Luis Tillería (Avanza), businessman, council member of the City of London Corporation
- Enrique Gómez (SUMA Party), psychologist

=== Withdrawn ===
Name	Born	Experience	Home province	Campaign	Ref
José Serrano	19 November 1970 (age 55); Cuenca, Azuay	President of the National Assembly (2017–2018); Member of the National Assembly (2017–2021); Minister of the Interior (2011–2016)	Pichincha	Running for: MCD nomination Announced: 31 July 2024; Withdrew: 27 August 2024	
Paola Pabón	28 January 1978 (age 48); Ibarra, Imbabura	Prefect of Pichincha Province (2019–present); Member of the National Assembly (2009–2015)	Pichincha	Ran for: RC nomination Announced: 6 June 2024; Withdrew: 7 August 2024 (endorsed González)	

=== Declined ===
The following notable individuals were the subject of speculation about their possible candidacy but publicly denied interest in running or were rejected as pre-candidates and declined to pursue their candidacies.

- Bolívar Armijos Velasco, President of the National Council of Rural Parochial Governments of Ecuador (2014–2019) and 2023 presidential candidate
- Pedro Freile, Director of the Inter-American Development Bank Ecuadorian Division (2004–2005), 2021 presidential candidate (endorsed Topić)
- Lucio Gutiérrez, member of the National Assembly (2023–present) and 43rd President of Ecuador (2003–2005) (endorsed González Náder)
- Guillermo Lasso (CREO), 47th President of Ecuador (2021–2023) (endorsed Tabacchi)
- Claudia Ormaza Loor (MCD), engineer
- Edwin Ortega (Gente Buena), retired Captain of the Ecuadorian Army (did not find support from any national party)
- Dallyana Passailaigue, member of the National Assembly (2017–present) (running for vice president; endorsed Kronfle)
- Cristina Reyes, President of the Andean Parliament (2023–present), Member of the National Assembly (2013–2021), Municipal Councillor of Guayaquil (2009–2012) (running for vice president; endorsed Cueva)
- Diana Salazar Méndez, Attorney General of Ecuador (2019–present)

== Opinion polls ==
=== Presidential election ===
==== First round ====
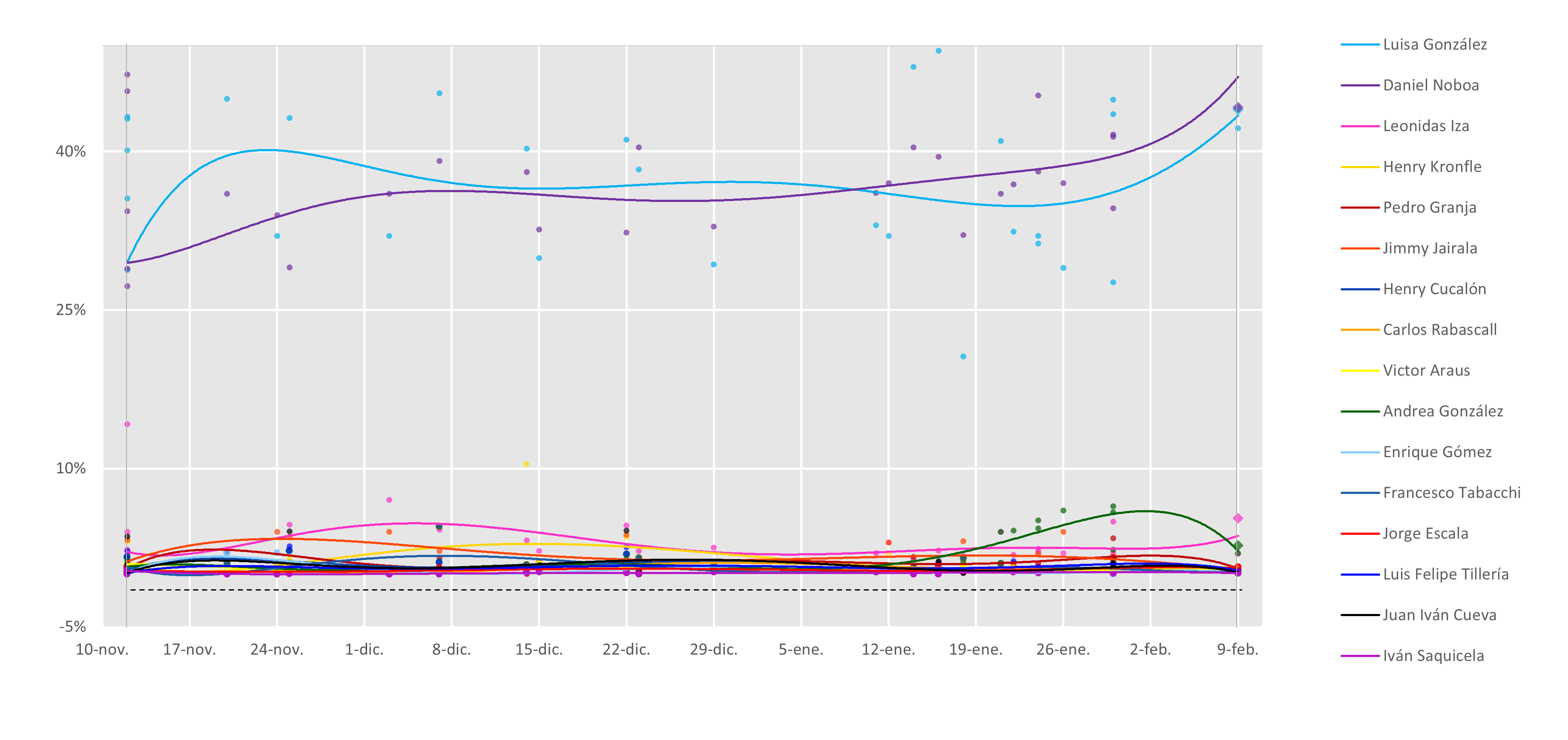
Local regression of polls conducted

==== Second round ====
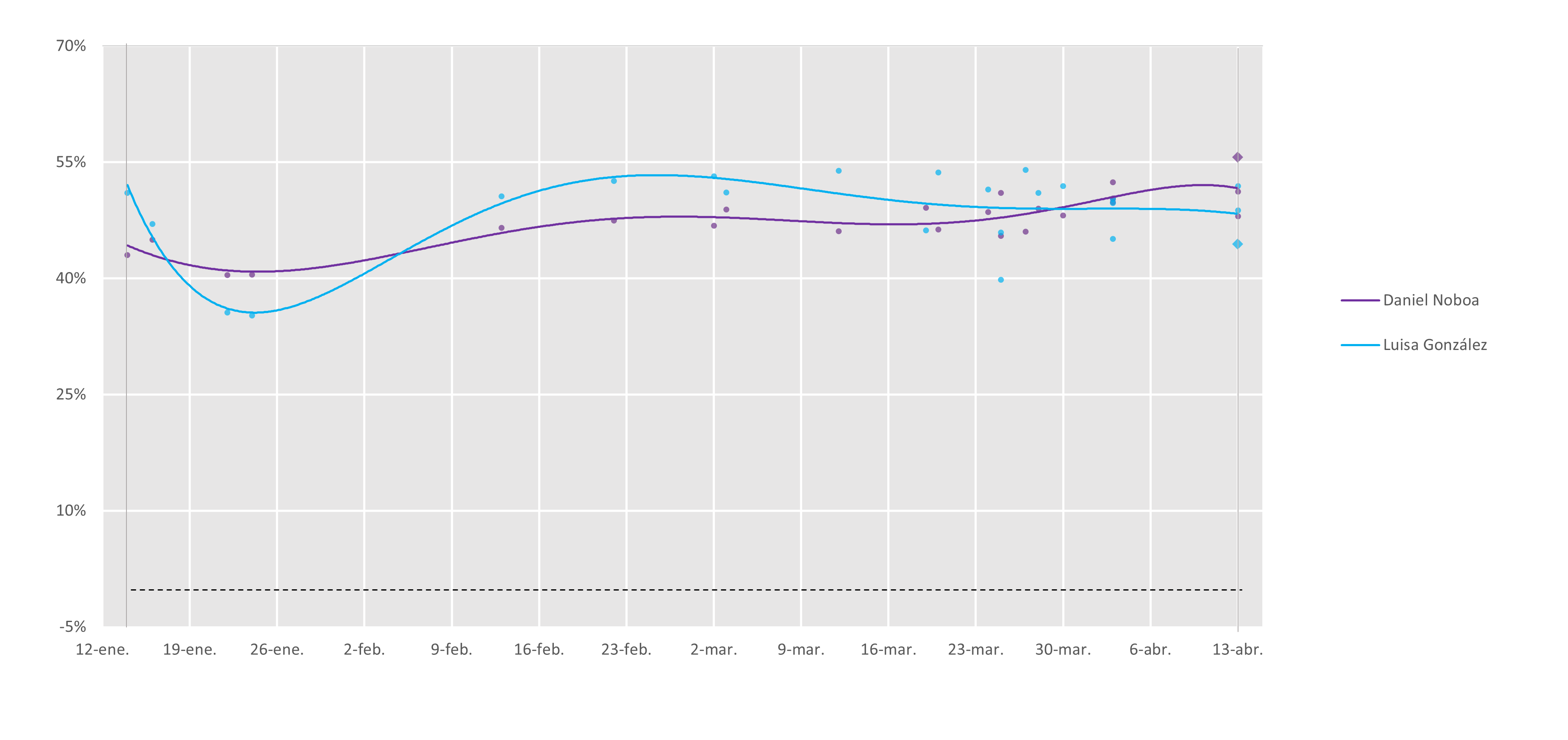
Local regression of polls conducted

== Conduct ==
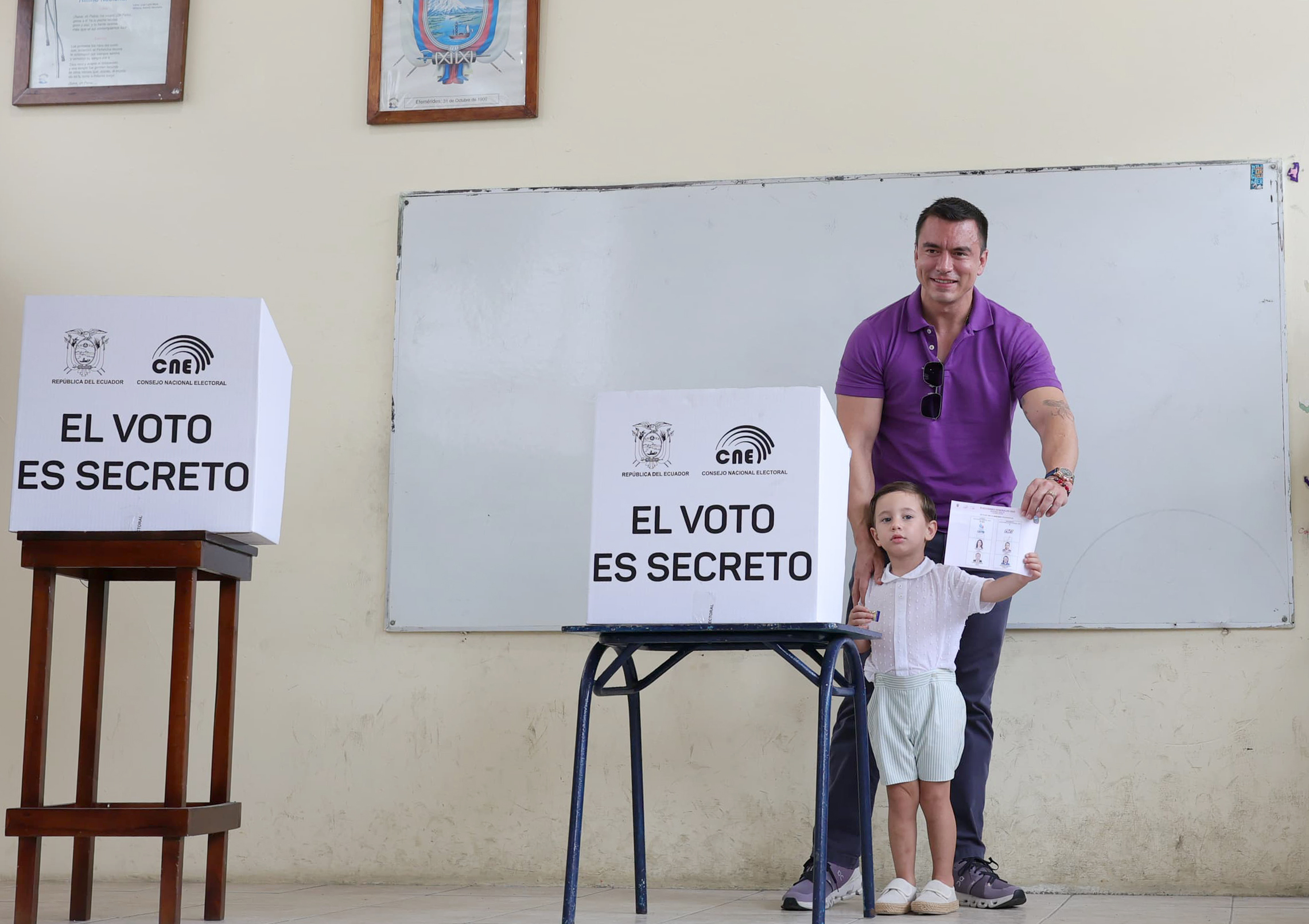
President Noboa with one of his children on the voting booth, 13 April 2025

On election day, the government deployed armored vehicles and soldiers carrying machine guns to secure polling booths while the country's land borders were closed.

Noboa's behavior during the official campaign period was criticized by the suspended Vice President and the opposition. He faced accusations of misusing public funds, engaging in lawfare against his detractors and exploiting public resources. There had been criticism regarding his social media advertising, which allegedly utilized bots and fake accounts.

A legal dispute has been ongoing since Noboa's refusal to relinquish his office during the official electoral period, which was intended for his vice president, Verónica Abad Rojas according to campaign law. Noboa told Congress stating, "Today, I will be President of Ecuador until 5 p.m. and will resume office at 11:59 p.m." while he attended political rallies. On other occasions, he had his secretary inform Congress that she was temporarily assuming the presidency. Abad had previously been suspended in November 2024 by the labor ministry for 150 days. Her suspension was lifted by a judge in December 2024, ordering the labor ministry to give her an apology for the suspension. On 30 March 2025, Noboa caused controversy for ignoring the Constitutional Court and appointing Cynthia Gellibert by decree as Vice President, suspending Abad once again, who was disenfranchised for two years by the TCE in a 3–2 decision issued in a gender-based political violence counterclaim filed by Foreign Minister Gabriela Sommerfeld following Abad's initial lawsuit against Noboa and others for alleged harassment. Analysts said Noboa was focused on institutional stability and a leadership aligned with his vision of government, which reinforced his political strategy in the wake of this election.

Noboa declared a state of emergency in seven of Ecuador's provinces leading up to the runoff election. According to European Union observers, the candidates were able to campaign without restrictions, and the freedoms of assembly and movement were guaranteed, despite the State of Exception in force. Freedoms of expression and the press were also respected. The observers noted, however, President Noboa's failure to apply to the Assembly for a 'licence' at the start of the campaign contributed to blurring the boundaries between the role of candidate and the role of president and that the fraud narrative by González despite the election being transparent was problematic.

== Results ==
Preliminary results in the first round showed no candidate in the presidential election had won an outright majority. Daniel Noboa received 44.17% of the vote, followed by Luisa González at 43.97%. Turnout was estimated at around 82%. On 24 February 2025, the Plenary of the CNE approved the numerical results of the 2025 general elections. After approval, three days were given for political organizations to file appeals with the CNE or the TCE if they considered it necessary. The final results for the presidential candidates were released on 12 March 2025. Luisa González achieved 44% (4,510,860 votes) and Daniel Noboa 44.17% (4,527,606 votes). The difference between them was 16,746 votes. During the election, Noboa's mother, Anabella Azín was elected to the National Assembly to represent the national constituency.

In the second round, Noboa received 55.63% of the vote, defeating González by 11.25 percentage points. The result exceeded expectations based on pre-election polling, with Noboa's campaign notable for its focus on young voters. Noboa was congratulated by various international leaders. González refused to concede and has requested a recount, alleging fraud without providing evidence. International observers, including the European Union and the Organization of American States, confirmed the elections were free and fair. Noboa held a victory rally in Olón, calling it a "historic victory," saying: "A victory by more than 10 points, a victory by over a million votes, leaving no doubt about who the winner is." González refused to concede, claiming election fraud without evidence.

In the National Assembly, the coalition formed by the Citizen Revolution Movement and the RETO Movement, led by former President Rafael Correa, secured a narrow plurality with 67 seats, followed closely by Noboa's National Democratic Action party with 66 seats. Mónica Salazar soon after left the Citizen Revolution Movement, reducing RC-RETO to 66 seats. Most smaller parties collapsed in seat share, save for Pachakutik, which won 9 seats. In the Andean Parliament, the ADN won three of Ecuador's five seats to RC-RETO's two.

=== President ===
Candidate	Running mate	Party	First round		Second round	
Candidate	Running mate	Party	Votes	%	Votes	%
Daniel Noboa	María José Pinto	National Democratic Action	4,527,606	44.17	5,870,618	55.63
Luisa González	Diego Borja	Citizen Revolution Movement–RETO	4,510,860	44.00	4,683,260	44.37
Leonidas Iza	Katiuska Molina	Pachakutik	538,456	5.25		
Andrea González	Galo Moncayo	Patriotic Society Party	275,376	2.69		
Henry Kronfle	Dallyana Passailaigue	Social Christian Party	73,293	0.71		
Pedro Granja	Verónica Silva	Socialist Party – Broad Front of Ecuador	53,940	0.53		
Jimmy Jairala	Lucía Vallecilla	Democratic Center	40,559	0.40		
Jorge Escala	Pacha Terán	Popular Unity	40,483	0.39		
Henry Cucalón	Carla Larrea	Movimiento Construye	37,316	0.36		
Luis Felipe Tillería	Karla Rosero	Avanza	33,239	0.32		
Francesco Tabacchi	Blanca Sacancela	Creating Opportunities	26,768	0.26		
Víctor Araus	Cristina Carrera	People, Equality and Democracy	22,678	0.22		
Carlos Rabascall	Alejandra Rivas	Democratic Left	22,270	0.22		
Enrique Gómez	Inés Díaz	SUMA Party	18,815	0.18		
Juan Cueva	Cristina Reyes	AMIGO Movement	17,545	0.17		
Iván Saquicela	María Luisa Coello	Democracy Yes	11,985	0.12		
Total			10,251,189	100.00	10,553,878	100.00
Valid votes			10,251,189	91.04	10,553,878	92.63
Invalid votes			765,649	6.80	763,180	6.70
Blank votes			243,573	2.16	75,956	0.67
Total votes			11,260,411	100.00	11,393,014	100.00
Registered voters/turnout			13,732,194	82.00	13,731,145	82.97
Source: CNE (first round), CNE (first round), CNE (second round), CNE (second round)

=== National Assembly ===
Party	National			Provincial			Overseas			Total seats	+/–
Party	Votes	%	Seats	Votes	%	Seats	Votes	%	Seats	Total seats	+/–
National Democratic Action	3,948,532	43.34	7			56			3	66	+52
Citizen Revolution Movement–RETO (Note: 66 seats won by RC, one won by RETO.)	3,764,230	41.32	7			57			3	67	+13
Social Christian Party	288,545	3.17	1			3			0	4	–10
Patriotic Society Party	210,083	2.31	0			1			0	1	–2
AMIGO Movement	162,721	1.79	0			0			0	0	–1
Popular Unity	156,802	1.72	0			1			0	1	0
SUMA Party	149,404	1.64	0			0			0	0	–4
Creating Opportunities	119,480	1.31	0			0			0	0	0
Ecuadorian Socialist Party	91,778	1.01	0			0			0	0	-1
Democratic Left	90,383	0.99	0			0			0	0	0
People, Equality and Democracy	67,367	0.74	0			0			0	0	0
Democratic Center	61,559	0.68	0			0			0	0	–1
Pachakutik						9			0	9	+5
Movimiento Construye						1			0	1	–28
Avanza						0			0	0	–3
Democracy Yes						0			0	0	0
Provincial movements						2			0	2	–4
Total	9,110,884	100.00	15			130			6	151	–
Valid votes	9,110,884	80.91									
Invalid votes	1,040,695	9.24									
Blank votes	1,109,547	9.85									
Total votes	11,261,126	100.00									
Registered voters/turnout	13,732,194	82.01									
Source: CNE

=== Andean Parliament ===
Party	Votes	%	Seats
National Democratic Action	3,908,340	42.58	3
Citizen Revolution Movement/RETO Movement	3,878,976	42.26	2
Social Christian Party	418,510	4.56	0
SUMA Party	201,309	2.19	0
Popular Unity	160,467	1.75	0
Movimiento Construye	125,350	1.37	0
Creating Opportunities	124,653	1.36	0
AMIGO Movement	102,461	1.12	0
Ecuadorian Socialist Party	100,275	1.09	0
Democratic Center	82,370	0.90	0
People, Equality and Democracy	75,990	0.83	0
Total	9,178,701	100.00	5
Valid votes	9,178,701	81.50	
Invalid votes	1,188,097	10.55	
Blank votes	894,739	7.95	
Total votes	11,261,537	100.00	
Registered voters/turnout	13,732,194	82.01	
Source: CNE

== Aftermath ==
=== First round ===
After the results, ADN cancelled a planned party celebration in a hotel in northern Quito, and Noboa did not make public declarations. The next day, he posted a written statement on Twitter thanking his voters. González, in a party meeting in Quito, said she would have dialogues with the other candidates. In the context of the polarization in the National Assembly between left- and right-wing political factions, the nine elected Pachakutik deputies play a crucial role. The Citizen's Movement can only achieve an absolute majority of 76 seats by forming a formal alliance with the Pachakutik Party. On the other hand, Noboa can secure a majority if he obtains support from at least one dissident deputy from the opposition.

==== Misconduct and voting fraud allegations ====
On the election day, Diego Tello Flores, a senior high-ranking official, announced the results of a post-electoral voter poll. He claimed to be the only one of the four pollsters authorized by his former employer, the CNE, to conduct this poll. According to his findings, Daniel Noboa was leading Luisa González by nearly 8 points, securing 50.12% of the votes and winning the election in the first round. This announcement led to significant controversy, with officials from the Citizen Revolution Movement accusing him of fraud, as such polls typically have a minimal margin of error. Tello reiterated in a live interview on Teleamazon that he had been compensated by the firm Estrategas and acted independently from the government. However, Estrategas quickly released a statement denying the company had paid him and that it had any participation in that particular poll. In the aftermath of the Tello Flores poll, Rafael Correa and Andrés Arauz expressed concerns about a potential coup attempt by Noboa. However their claims did not come to happen, and the run-off elections proceeded as usual.

On 11 February, in his first interview after the elections, Noboa claimed he had evidence of fraud, which he alleged was confirmed by an Organization of American States report. However, officials from the OAS dismissed this claim, clarifying that no abnormalities had been detected at that time. Noboa also alleged that armed groups associated with drug trafficking were intentionally released from prisons to intimidate voters into supporting the Citizens' Revolution. This claim was dismissed by National Assembly President Viviana Veloz, as well as by Luisa González and Rafael Correa. On 17 February, Andrés Arauz filed a formal demand with the Electoral Disputes Tribunal (TCE; Tribunal Contencioso Electoral) to contest the results of 700 polling station minutes from Esmeraldas Province, as well as hundreds from Sucumbíos Province, saying that it would be sufficient to secure the election of two National Deputies, increasing the number of National Assembly seats for the Citizens Revolution party from 67 to a total of 69, which was rejected.

The CNE said that several people, including poll workers, were arrested during the run-off vote on 13 April for electoral anomalies that included double voting and reports of counterfeit, pre-marked ballots. Seventeen people were caught taking photos of their ballots despite a ban imposed by the CNE due to reports of voter coercion by criminal groups.

==== Endorsement negotiations ====
On 12 February, Leonidas Iza categorically rejected any negotiations with Noboa's party, the ADN. He announced that several meetings would take place within CONAIE (Confederation of Indigenous Nationalities of Ecuador) and its political arm, the Pachakutik Party, to determine their stance on a potential alliance with the Citizens' Revolution for the second presidential round and beyond. On 13 February, Diego Borja, the vice-presidential candidate for Citizens Revolution, expressed a desire to initiate a joint program with Pachakutik. The primary objective is to establish a National Constituent Assembly that includes the proposal to redefine Ecuador as a Plurinational State, akin to Bolivia. On 19 February, Leonidas Iza announced the convocation of an Expanded Grand Council for 7 March 2025, where indigenous peoples would make the final decision on currently debated proposals for a programmatic political alliance with the Citizens' Revolution Movement.

On 14 February the Social Christian Party announced that they would support Daniel Noboa in the second round, saying "We have never supported or voted for Rafael Correa in any election".

On 12 March, CONAIE's branch in the Amazon region, CONFENIAE, endorsed Noboa, triggering a dispute within the organization and in Pachakutik. On 30 March, Pachakutik endorsed Luisa González after she had agreed to 25 demands listed by the party.

=== Run-off reactions ===
==== Domestic ====
In Quito and Guayaquil, Noboa supporters celebrated in the streets. The following day, support for González's call for a recount had dwindled as several prominent politicians of the Citizen Revolution Movement said Noboa had won, including Leonardo Orlando, the prefect of Manabí Province, the prefects of Guayas and Pichincha, as well as Aquiles Alvarez, the mayor of Guayaquil who added that "the worst is to be a bad loser". Pachakutik, "with total respect for democracy", congratulated Noboa for his re-election. The Social Christian Party also congratulated Noboa. The CNE dismissed the claims of fraud, saying the process had been "totally transparent." It added González had not yet made a formal request for a recount. RETO congratulated Noboa and announced they would support his administration in the National Assembly.

On 19 April, the Ministry of Government declared a state of “maximum alert” over an assassination plot against Noboa. In a statement named “The revenge of the bad losers", it said "all security protocols have been activated” due to the threat emanating from “criminal organizations, in collusion with political groups defeated at the polls”.

==== International ====
The heads of both missions of international observers from the EU and the OAS monitored the vote and said the voting atmosphere was one of "normality", as well as free and fair. Secretary General of the Organization of American States, Luis Almagro, said Noboa's win was consistent with what OAS officials observed during voting. US President Donald Trump congratulated Noboa and said he would not disappoint the Ecuadorian people, with the U.S. State Department calling the election free and fair. Noboa was also congratulated by French President Emmanuel Macron, Argentine President Javier Milei, Brazilian President Luiz Inácio Lula da Silva, Chilean President Gabriel Boric, Ukrainian President Volodymyr Zelenskyy, and Uruguayan President Yamandú Orsi.

González meanwhile received support from Colombian President Gustavo Petro, Mexican President Claudia Sheinbaum, and Venezuelan President Nicolás Maduro, who said he denounced the "horrible fraud".
