= Luisa González =

Ecuadorian lawyer and politician (born 1977)

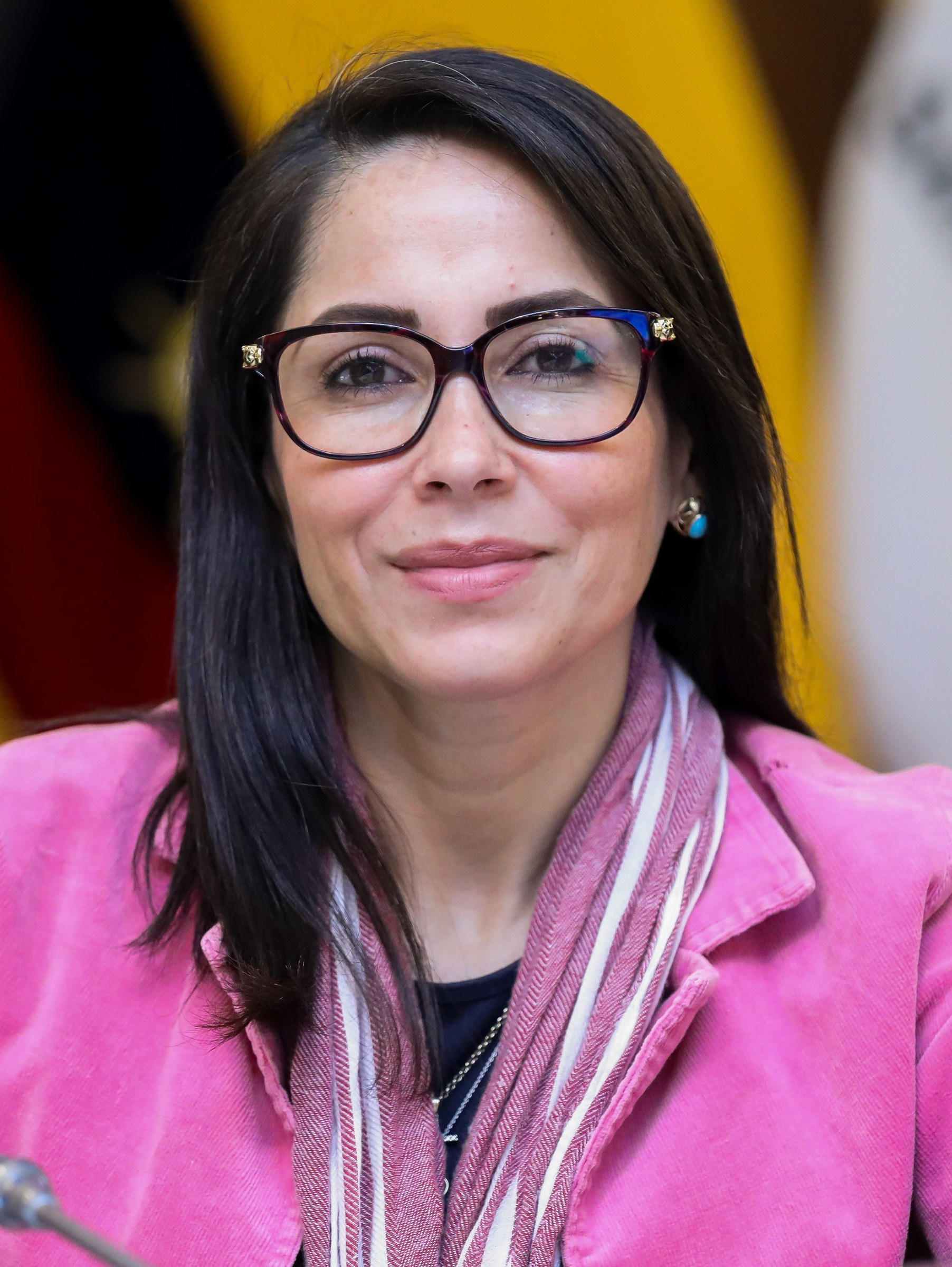
- González in 2022

Secretary of International Affairs of the Citizen Revolution Movement
- Incumbent
- Assumed office 18 January 2026
- President: Gabriela Rivadeneira
- Preceded by: David Villamar

President of the Citizen Revolution Movement
- In office 18 November 2023 – 18 January 2026
- Vice President: Alejandro Tonello
- General Secretary: Andrés Arauz
- Preceded by: Francisco Hidalgo
- Succeeded by: Gabriela Rivadeneira

Member of the National Assembly from Manabí's 1st district
- In office 14 May 2021 – 17 May 2023

Secretary of Public Administration
- In office 4 January 2017 – 24 May 2017
- President: Rafael Correa
- Preceded by: Pedro Solines Chacón
- Succeeded by: Juan Sebastián Roldán

Personal details
- Born: Luisa Magdalena González Alcívar; 22 November 1977 (age 48) Quito, Ecuador
- Party: Citizen Revolution Movement
- Other political affiliations: Union for Hope (before 2018); Social Christian Party (before 2007)
- Children: 1
- Education: Complutense University of Madrid

Luisa Magdalena González Alcívar (born 22 November 1977) is an Ecuadorian politician and lawyer. She has been the International Affairs Secretary of Citizen Revolution Movement since 2026. She had also served as the President of the party from 2023 to 2026 and was its presidential candidate in the 2023 and 2025 elections. She was previously a member of the National Assembly from Manabí between 2021 and 2023.

González worked as the Ecuadorian Vice Consul in Spain and served in various positions in the administration of President Rafael Correa between 2007 and 2017, including as Secretary of Public Administration. In the 2021 legislative elections, González was elected to the National Assembly as a representative of Manabí Province. She would leave office early due to President Guillermo Lasso dissolving the National Assembly through the muerte cruzada decree in 2023.

González was selected as the Citizen Revolution Movement's presidential candidate for the 2023 election, with Andrés Arauz as her running mate. One of her campaign promises was to make former President Correa a central figure in her administration. After finishing in first place in the first round of voting, she went on to lose to Daniel Noboa, securing 47% of the vote. González would be elected as the party's president following the election. She was once again selected as the party's candidate for president in the 2025 election, with Diego Borja selected as her running mate. She would go on to lose the election once again to Noboa, winning 44% of the vote, demanding a recount and alleging fraud. González's claims were rejected by the European Union and the Organization of American States, who observed the election.

== Early life and education ==
Luisa Magdalena González Alcívar was born in Quito, Pichincha province, on 22 November 1977. She was raised in Chone, Manabí Province, where she attended María Angélica Idrobo School. In 2007 she obtained her law degree from the Universidad Internacional del Ecuador. She then received a master's degree in executive management from the Institute of Higher National Studies in Ecuador in 2016, and a master's degree in economics from Universidad Complutense de Madrid in 2017.

Gonzalez worked at UniBanco, a financial institution in Quito, between 2002 and 2003. She also worked as research assistant at the Universidad Internacional del Ecuador in 2005. In 2007, she attempted her first run for a seat to the National Assembly, sponsored by the Social Christian Party but was not elected. She served in various positions in the government of Rafael Correa from 2007 to 2017.

== Early political career ==
In 2007, she was a candidate to the National Congress to represent Pichincha Province, running under the sponsorship of the right-wing Partido Social Cristiano (PSC); attempt that was not successful. In 2008, she worked as an advisor to the Secretariat of Communication and Information of Ecuador, and that same year she became General Coordinator of Human Resources, Institutional Development and Training of the Superintendence of Companies.

In 2010, she assumed the role of General Coordinator of the Presidential Strategic Agenda. Then in 2011, she was appointed as Vice Consul of Ecuador in Madrid, Spain. In 2014, González was promoted to Vice Minister of Tourism Management in the Ministry of Tourism. In 2015, she was appointed Undersecretary in charge of the Presidential Agenda and, later, Secretary General of the Presidential Office. That same year, González also held the position of Consul General of Ecuador in Madrid.

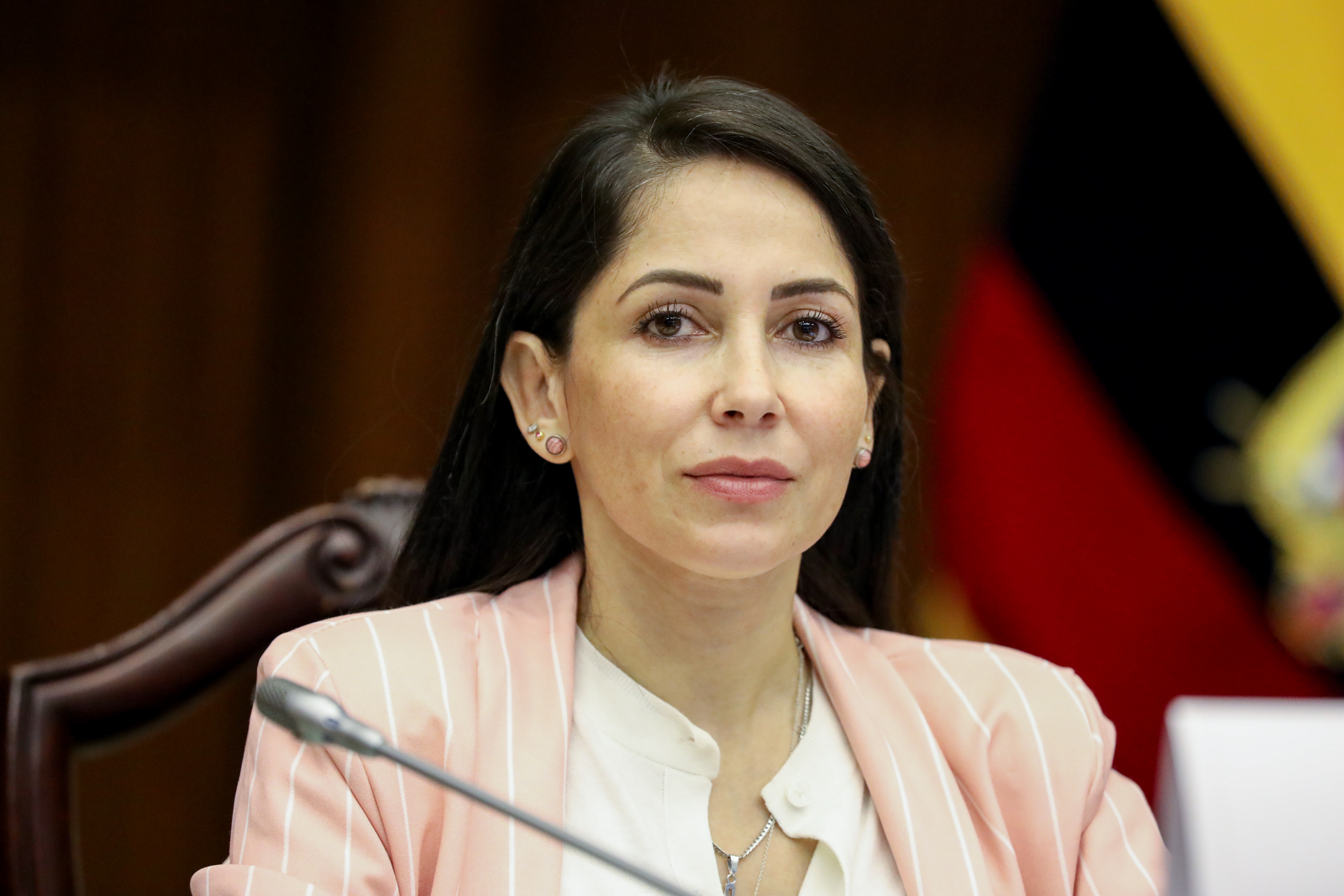
González in May 2022

In 2016, she assumed the role of Deputy Secretary General of Public Administration. In 2017, she held different positions, such as advisor in the company Correos del Ecuador, National Secretary of Public Administration, Minister of Labor in charge, Secretary General of the Quito Companies Intendancy in the Superintendence of Companies, and Consul General of Ecuador in Alicante. In 2018, she became the national secretary for the Andean Parliament and in 2019, became the parliamentary advisor.

In 2019, an examination showed González used presidential aircraft to travel to various countries when she was a member of the government, without making a request to the President of the Republic. The Comptroller's Office found her liable for a total of $880,473 for the irregular use of the presidential plane to travel to tax havens.

== National Assembly (2021–2023) ==
González was elected as member of the National Assembly in the 2021 legislative elections, representing the Manabí Province for the first district, for the Union for Hope alliance. In February 2022, during a debate in the National Assembly on the decriminalization of abortion in cases of rape, she controversially denied abortion as a right. González also objected to the Menstrual Health and Hygiene bill that, among various things, proposed the free distribution of menstrual pads. On 17 May 2023, when President Guillermo Lasso dissolved the National Assembly through the decree muerte cruzada, González's tenure as an assemblywoman ended.

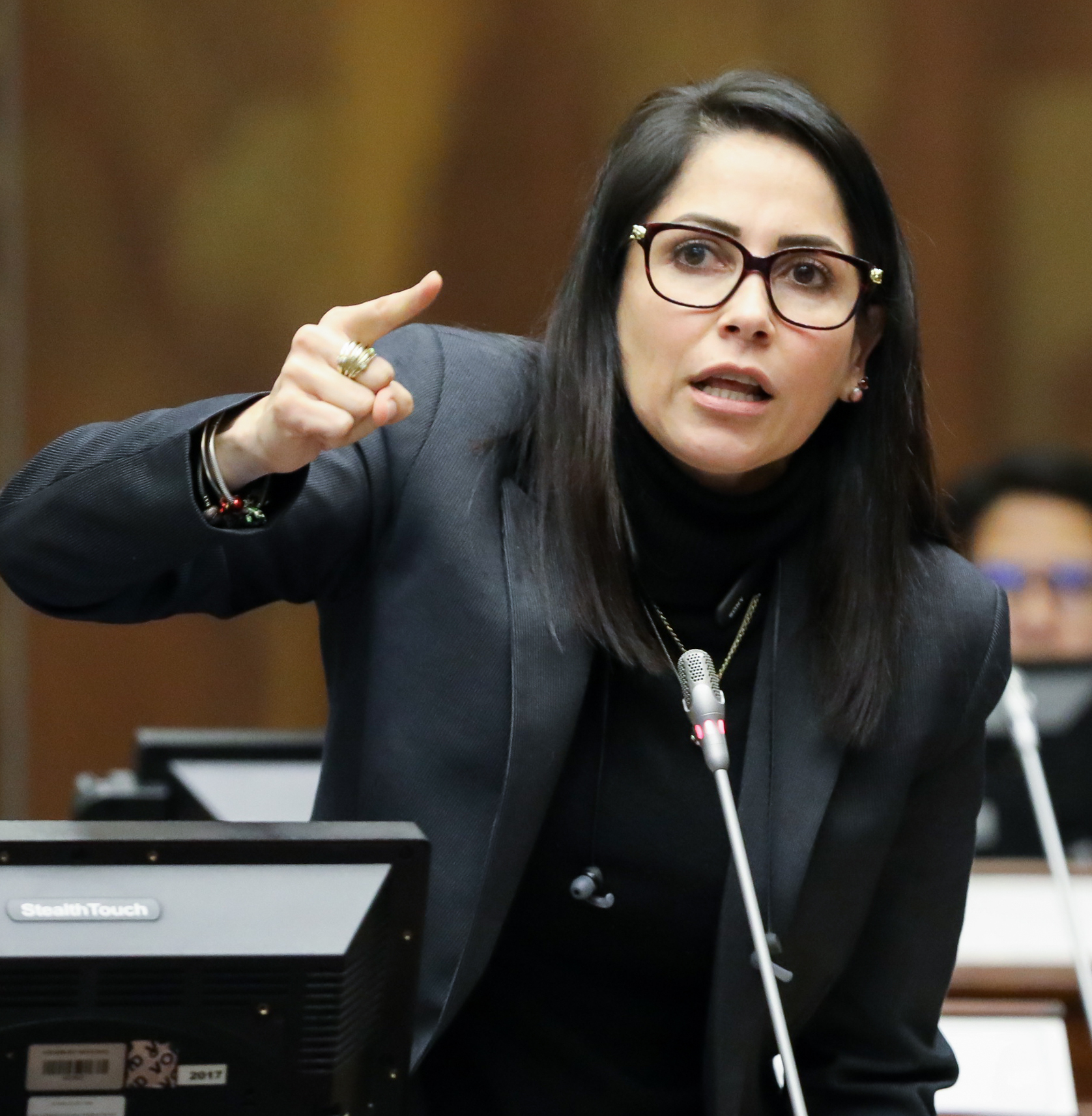
González in March 2023

== Presidential campaigns ==
=== 2023 presidential election ===
On 10 June 2023, González was designated as the presidential candidate for the Citizen Revolution Movement to participate in the 2023 general election, after former Vice President Jorge Glas declined the nomination. 2021 presidential candidate Andrés Arauz was nominated as her running mate. Had González been elected president, she would have been the first female elected president in the country's history. (Note: While considered to be the 39th President of Ecuador, Rosalía Arteaga assumed the presidency as acting president following the resignation of Abdalá Bucaram, serving for two days.)

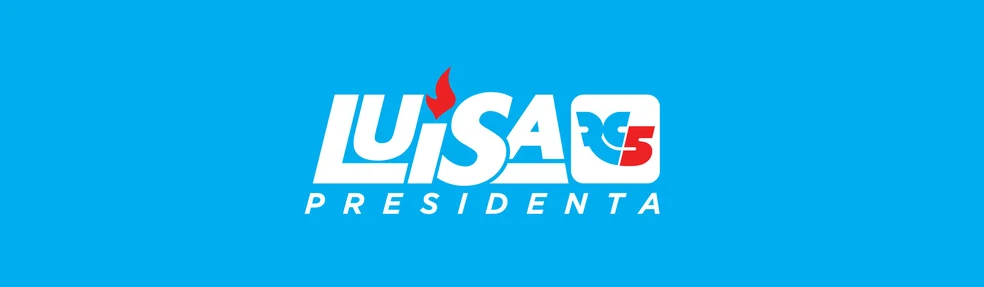
González's 2023 campaign logo

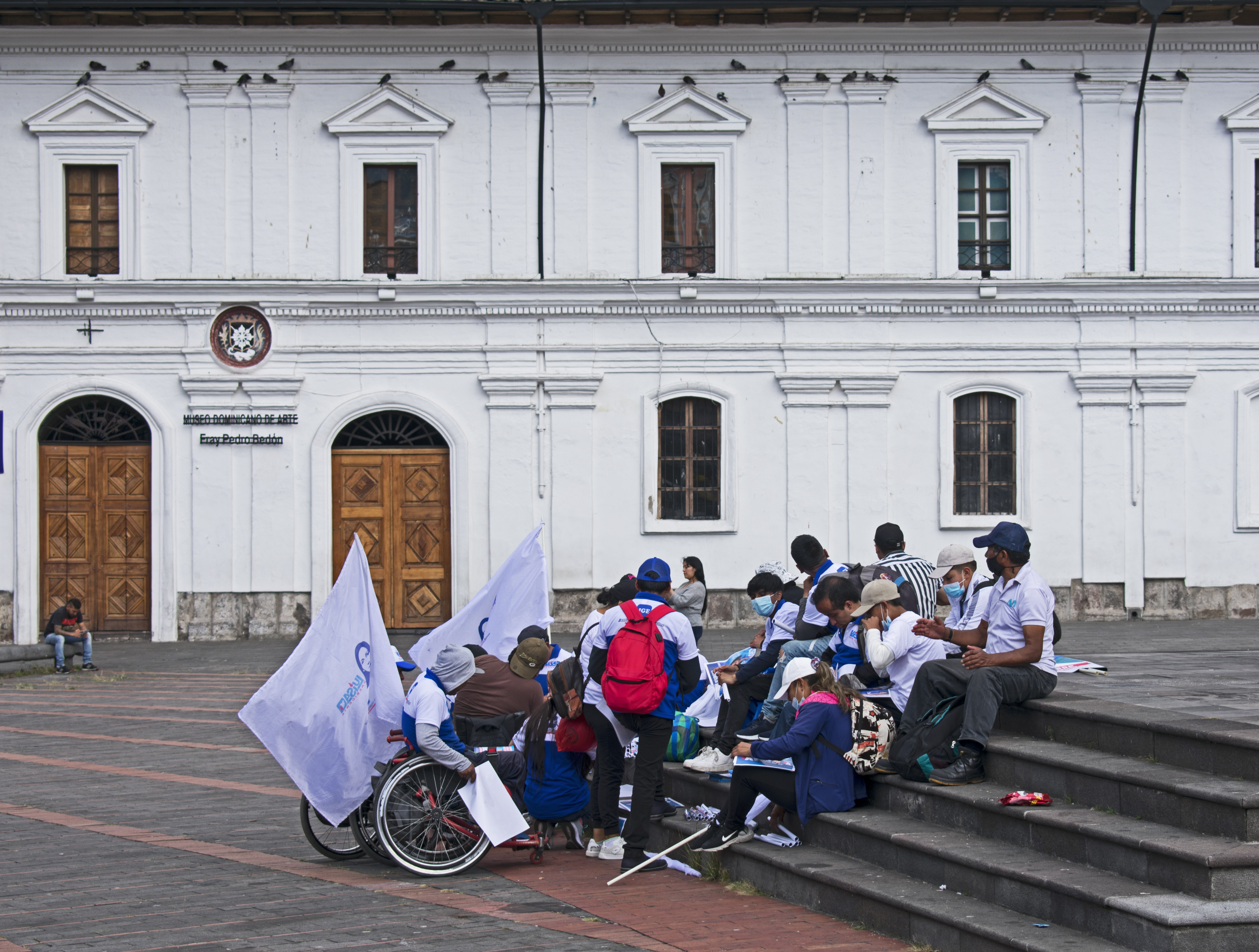
González supporters in the center of Quito four days before the first round vote of the 2023 elections

On 13 June, while González was about to register her presidential candidacy with the National Electoral Council (CNE) with her supporters and the president of the Citizen Revolution movement, Marcela Aguiñaga, they were attacked with pepper spray and tear gas by the National Police. González was treated at a Quito medical center after flushing the pepper spray from her eyes. The National Police claimed to have used chemical agents to protect security and public order because of the hostile behavior of González's supporters. González was able to register her candidacy at the end of the day.

On 16 June, the National Electoral Council denied González's candidacy because the party had not presented the corresponding documents. The CNE provided a period of 48 hours for González to correct the issue for her to participate in the elections. However, the next day, the Citizen Revolution Movement stated that the missing requirement was being corrected, and on 20 June the registration was accepted.

During her campaign, González had vowed to make former President Rafael Correa a central figure in her administration such as a "principal advisor". A poll conducted on 9 July, showed González as the front-runner with nearly 34% and former Vice President Otto Sonnenholzner in second place with 17.5%. Two polls conducted on 9 August, the day of Fernando Villavicencio's assassination, found González in first place at 35.4% and 24% with Villavicencio in second place at 18.4% and 12.5% respectively. On 12 August, a poll found her narrowly ahead of right-wing businessman Jan Topić for first place with 24.9% to Topić's 21.7%.

In the first round of the election, González advanced to the run-off election set for 15 October, after winning 33% of the vote. She faced businessman and former Assembly member Daniel Noboa of the National Democratic Action. She lost the run-off election to Noboa on 15 October, after winning 47% of the vote. Had she been elected, she could have been the first woman elected to the presidency in Ecuador's history, and the second female president after Rosalía Arteaga, who briefly served as president for two days in February 1997.

Following her presidential defeat, González was elected President of the Citizen Revolution Movement on 18 November 2023, succeeding Francisco Hidalgo. Alejandro Tonello was designated as the party's vice president and her former running mate Andrés Arauz was designated as party secretary.

=== 2025 presidential election ===
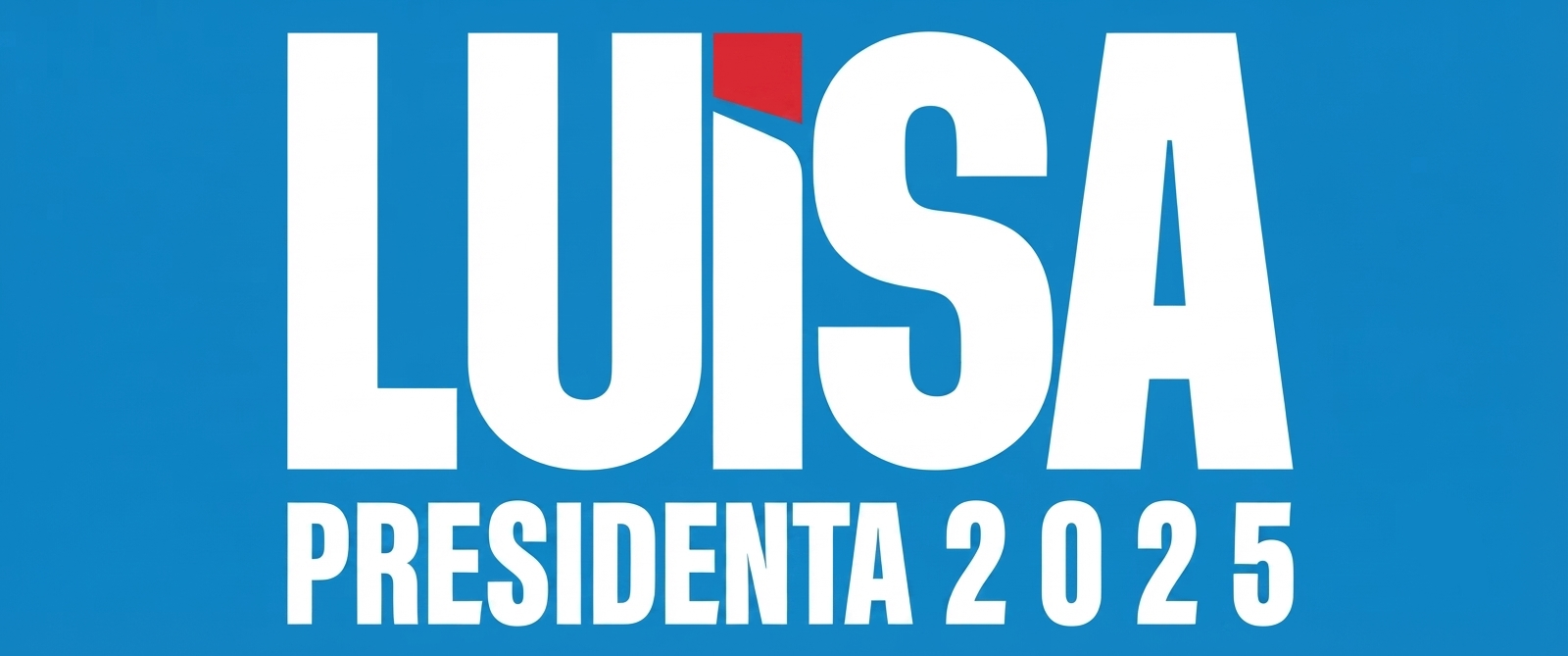
González's 2025 campaign logo

In February 2024, González registered a pre-candidate for a second presidential campaign for the 2025 general election. She is running for the Citizen Revolution Movement (RC) nomination. In June 2024, Pichincha Province Prefect Paola Pabón announced she would also be running for the RC nomination, challenging González. The following month, a poll was conducted with González in the lead with 40.1% against President Daniel Noboa's 34.6%. In August 2024, Pabón ended her campaign, making González the sole presidential candidate for the RC nomination. On 10 August 2024, González became the official nominee of the Citizen Revolution Movement for the Presidency for the 2025 election. The party also named former Economy and Finance Minister Diego Borja as González's running mate.

González secured the endorsement of the Pachakutik party after agreeing to 25 demands listed by the party. In the general election in February 2025, she advanced to the run-off against President Daniel Noboa, coming in second place after winning 43.97% of the vote. Two months later, González was defeated after winning 44% of the vote against Noboa's 55.7%. She refused to concede, alleging fraud without providing evidence.

=== 2029 presidential election ===
On 27 June 2026, González stated that she does not rule out yet another presidential campaign for the 2029 election.

== 2026 prefectural campaign ==
On 23 January 2026, González was replaced by former Assemblywoman Gabriela Rivadeneira as President of the Citizen Revolution Movement during a party convention in Manta. She was subsequently assumed the role as Secretary of International Affairs of the party. After returning from a tour trip in Mexico on 26 April, González denied accusations that she is seeking political asylum there and announced her intentions to vie for the position of Prefect of Manabí for the 2026 local elections. On 27 June, she officially announced her pre-candidacy for the election with the AMIGO Movement selecting her as their nominee, she is running with Assemblyman Guido Mendoza as her Vice Prefect.

== Political positions ==
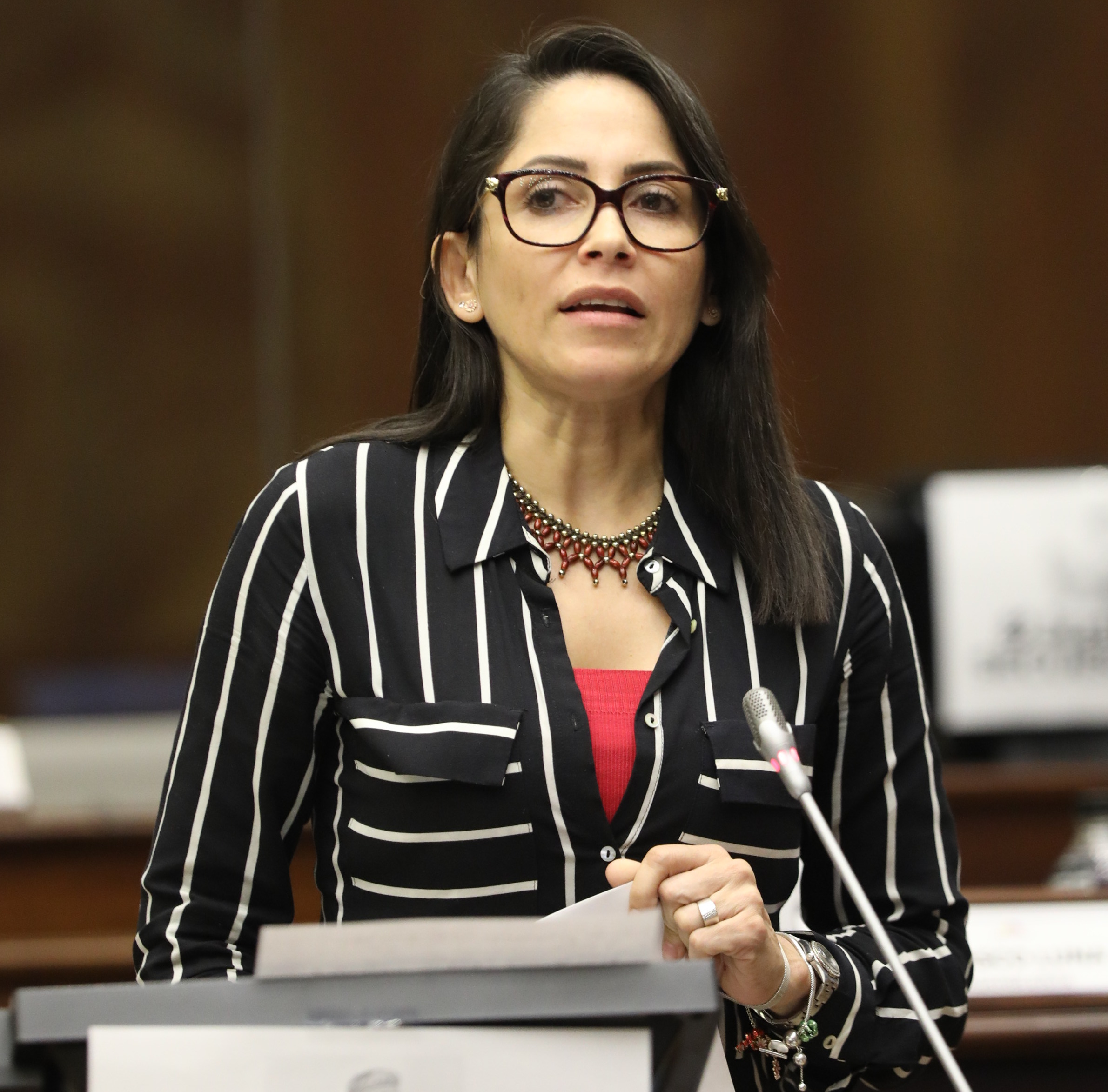
González in September 2022

González has been widely described as a protégé of former President Rafael Correa. She has been critical of President Guillermo Lasso and vowed to review all presidential decrees and executive actions done by Lasso in the aftermath of muerte cruzada. Her political ideology has been seen as left-wing and supportive of socialist ideas. She is set to represent socialism of the 21st century and a bearer of correism.

González said that she would treat the United States equally as she would other countries. She also insisted that the United States should respect the country's "self-determination". She has described herself as an "animal rights defender" and has repeatedly invoked Correa's political positions and administration on the campaign trail. She has promised to reintroduce social and welfare programs that Correa had implemented during his presidency. González has also vowed to use $2.5 billion from international reserves to address the economy and invest in public infrastructure. González has denied that she would pardon Correa's corruption conviction, should she be elected.

In 2023, as a presidential candidate, González argued that "Venezuela has better living conditions than Ecuador". During the 2023 referendum, González supported the measure that would have allowed oil exploitation in the Yasuní National Park, citing that it would benefit financial budgets aimed at education and the economy.

=== Abortion ===
When she was a member of the National Assembly, González took an anti-abortion stance, rejecting the idea of abortion being a right. Prior to working in the Correa administration, González was a member of the Social Christian Party.

== Personal life ==
González married at the age of 15 and divorced when she was 22 years old. She has one son from the marriage. González said that she is an evangelical.

== Notes ==
Government offices
Preceded by Pedro Solines Chacón	Secretary of Public Administration; 2017	Succeeded by Juan Sebastián Roldán
Party political offices
Preceded by Andrés Arauz	RC nominee for President of Ecuador; 2023, 2025	Most recent
