= Pascual del Cioppo =

Ecuadorian politician

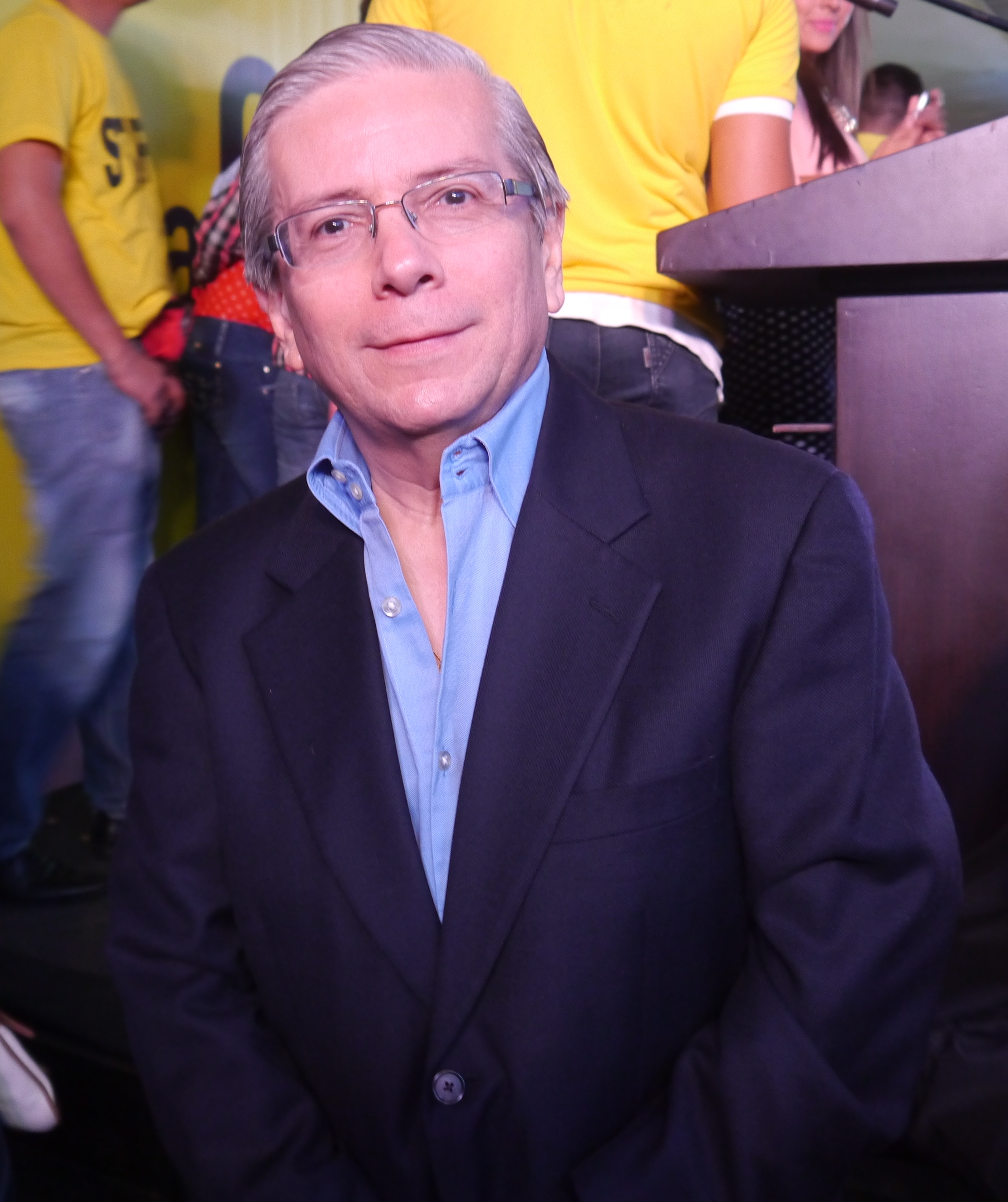
Image of Pascual del Cioppo

Pascual del Cioppo is an Ecuadorian politician and businessman, president of the Christian Social Party from 1999 to 2021 and member of the National Assembly from 1992 to 1996 and again from 1998 to 2007. He was appointed ambassador to Spain in 2021 by Guillermo Lasso but resigned after a few months following a controversy. He was appointed ambassador to Qatar in 2023 by Daniel Noboa.

He is also executive chairman, president and chief executive officer of CoreLite.

He is a member of Opus Dei and is known for his vehement opposition to all forms of contraception.
