= Henry Kronfle =

Ecuadorian businessman and politician

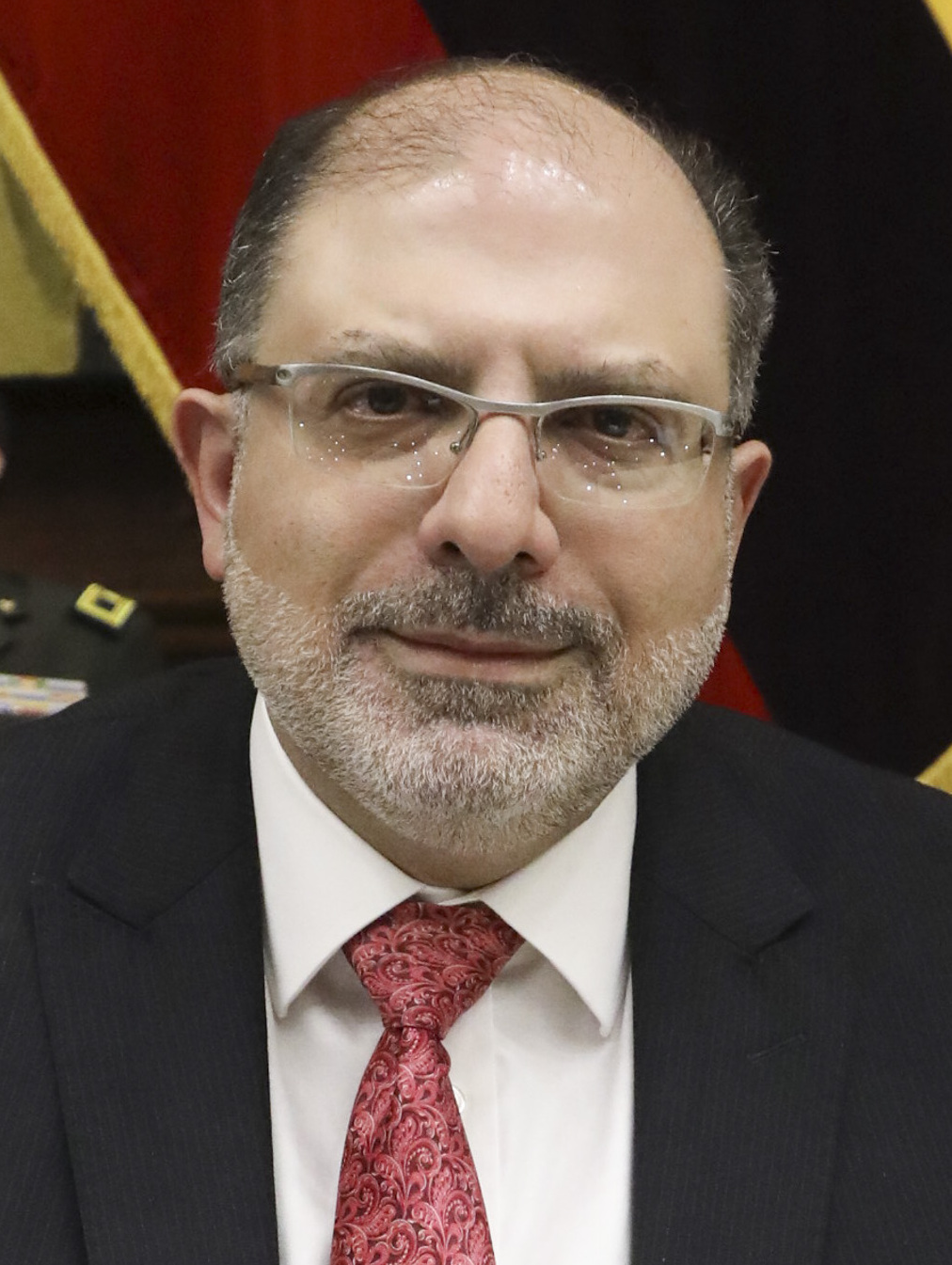
- Kronfle in 2024

President of the National Assembly
- In office 18 November 2023 – 2 October 2024
- Preceded by: Virgilio Saquicela
- Succeeded by: Viviana Veloz

Personal details
- Born: 1972 (age 53–54) Guayaquil, Ecuador
- Party: Social Christian Party
- Occupation: Politician; businessman

Henry Fabián Kronfle Kozhaya (born 1972) is an Ecuadorian businessman and politician, serving as the President of the National Assembly from November 2023 to October 2024. He ran for President of Ecuador in the 2025 general election.

== Life ==
Kronfle was born in Guayaquil. Before entering politics, he served as president of the Chamber of Industries of Ecuador and Guayaquil, as well as a university professor. He also manages and is a shareholder in several companies such as Maupaz S.A., Inmobiliaria Krokoz S.A., Rioariesa S.A., Promo Marketing S.A. and Inmobiliaria Krovi S.A.

== Political career ==
In 2017, when Lenín Moreno was elected president, he entered politics as a candidate for assembly for the Social Christian Party. Politically described as a conservative, for the 2021 presidential elections, he was emerging as one of the presidential candidates for the Social Christian Party. Hever, after the election of Cristina Reyes as a candidate, and the subsequent alliance with another movement to jointly present the candidacy of Guillermo Lasso, he was nominated as first by the Social Christian Party on the list of national candidates for the National Assembly of Ecuador.

He remained part of the Social Christian Party and was re-elected in 2021 and, as a result of early elections due to the Muerte cruzada political mechanism, was re-elected in 2023. According to the website of the State Comptroller General, he has the third highest assets in the new Legislature, with a fortune that exceeds four million dollars. Likewise, he is the assembly member who pays the most taxes, according to his 2022 declaration

He was elected President of the National Assembly on 18 November 2023 with 128 votes from the legislature's 137 members, while the rest abstained. It was part of a deal between the leftist Citizens' Revolution movement, the conservative Social Christian Party, and incoming president Daniel Noboa's centrist National Democratic Action. Along with other minor parties, they agreed to form a legislative majority, bringing it to at least 85 seats.

In August 2024, Kronfle registered to run for President of Ecuador in the 2025 general election under the Christian Social Party ticket. His running mate is assembly member Dallyana Passailaigue. In October 2024 Viviana Veloz took over the Presidency of the National Assembly.
