= Cristina Reyes =

Ecuadorian poet, lawyer, and politician

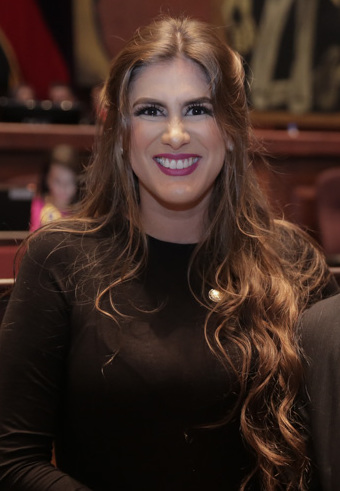
- Reyes in 2017

Member of the National Assembly
- Incumbent
- Assumed office May 14, 2017
- Constituency: Guayas

Municipal Councilor of Guayaquil
- In office July 31, 2009 – November 10, 2012

Member of the Constituent Assembly
- In office November 30, 2007 – October 25, 2008
- Constituency: Guayas

President of the Andean Parliament
- Incumbent
- Assumed office July 14, 2023

Personal details
- Born: Cristina Eugenia Reyes Hidalgo; August 26, 1981 (age 45) Guayaquil, Ecuador
- Party: Madera de Guerrero; Social Christian
- Domestic partner: Patrick Mitaz (Divorced)
- Children: 0
- Education: Francisco de Vitoria University
- Occupation: Former Miss World-Ecuador,Poet, lawyer, politician

Cristina Eugenia Reyes Hidalgo (born August 26, 1981) is a Former Miss World - Ecuador, an Ecuadorian poet, lawyer, and politician who has served as President of the Andean Parliament since 2023. She is a member of the National Assembly for the Social Christian Party and part of the Legislative Administration Council.

== Biography ==
Cristina Reyes was born on August 26, 1981 into a Catholic family, the daughter of doctors Xavier Reyes Feijoo and Cristina Hidalgo de Reyes. She has two younger brothers, Xavier and Belisario Reyes Hidalgo. She studied at Las Mercedarias Catholic school, and was named queen of the city of Guayaquil in 2001. She studied law at the Catholic University of Santiago de Guayaquil and earned a master's degree in Political Action from Francisco de Vitoria University in Spain.

She competed at Miss Ecuador 2004 where she placed 1st Runner-up and gained the right to represent her country at Miss World 2004 in Sanya, China. Although she did not make the first cut at Miss World 2004, Reyes placed in the top 10's Beauty Beach and top 20's Talent competitions. In 2005, Cristina was selected to compete at Miss Earth 2005 in Quezon City, Philippines; she placed in the top 16 at the final night. It was the first Ecuadorian classification in this beauty contest.

She was a program host at TC Televisión, Telesistema (now RTS), Telerama, and Ecuavisa.

Her first appearance as a reporter on television was on the program Ventana a la Calle, hosted by Kenneth Carrera, who was later replaced by Reyes when he became involved in politics.

== Political career ==
In November 2007, Reyes was a member of the Constituent Assembly for the Social Christian Party, where she joined the panel on Sovereignty and Latin American integration. For the 2009 Guayaquil municipal election, she was nominated as city councilor for the alliance between the Social Christian Party and the Madera de Guerrero Civic Movement, obtaining the second highest vote among the councilors, behind only Polo Baquerizo.

In November 2012 she resigned as councilor to participate in the 2013 legislative elections, in which she was elected as a National Assembly member representing Guayas Province. During her term she was part of the Workers' and Social Security Commission.

In the 2017 legislative election she retained her seat in the Assembly.

In August 2017, she accused the Legislative Administration of inefficiency in an interview, which caused her to be sanctioned in January 2018 with a 10-day suspension without pay. In response, on January 16, she filed a protective action with the Judicial Branch to counteract the measure. A week later, Judge Lucila Gómez dismissed the sanction, accepting the protective action in her favor.

On January 8, 2019, Reyes was retained as the third member of the Legislative Council (CAL) with 79 votes in favor, 27 against, and 11 abstentions, following the resignation of Luis Fernando Torres.

Before the elections in February 2021, she requested unpaid leave from the assembly so that she could take part in the elections. 42 other members also made the same request including Wilma Andrade, Esther Cuesta Santana, Mónica Alemán, Dallyana Passailaigue and Verónica Arias. During her absence her job would be carried out by her substitute.

In the elections to renew the Andean Parliament, held on July 14, 2023, she was elected President of the Andean Parliament for one year.

In March 2024, Reyes announced her intentions to register as an Independent pre-candidate for President of Ecuador in the upcoming 2025 general election.

== Personal life ==
She is Divorced from Quito businessman Patrick Mitaz.

== Publications ==
- Travesía (2000), collection of 62 poems, most with a romantic theme
- Tierna Furia (2007), poetry collection
- @Yo Libertadora (2012), poetry collection
- Mis plenos poderes (2018), poetry collection

Awards and achievements
Preceded by Mayra Rentería	Miss World Ecuador; 2004	Succeeded by Marielisa Márquez
Preceded by María Luisa Barrios	Miss Earth Ecuador; 2005	Succeeded by Magdalena Stahl
