= Olón =

- Town
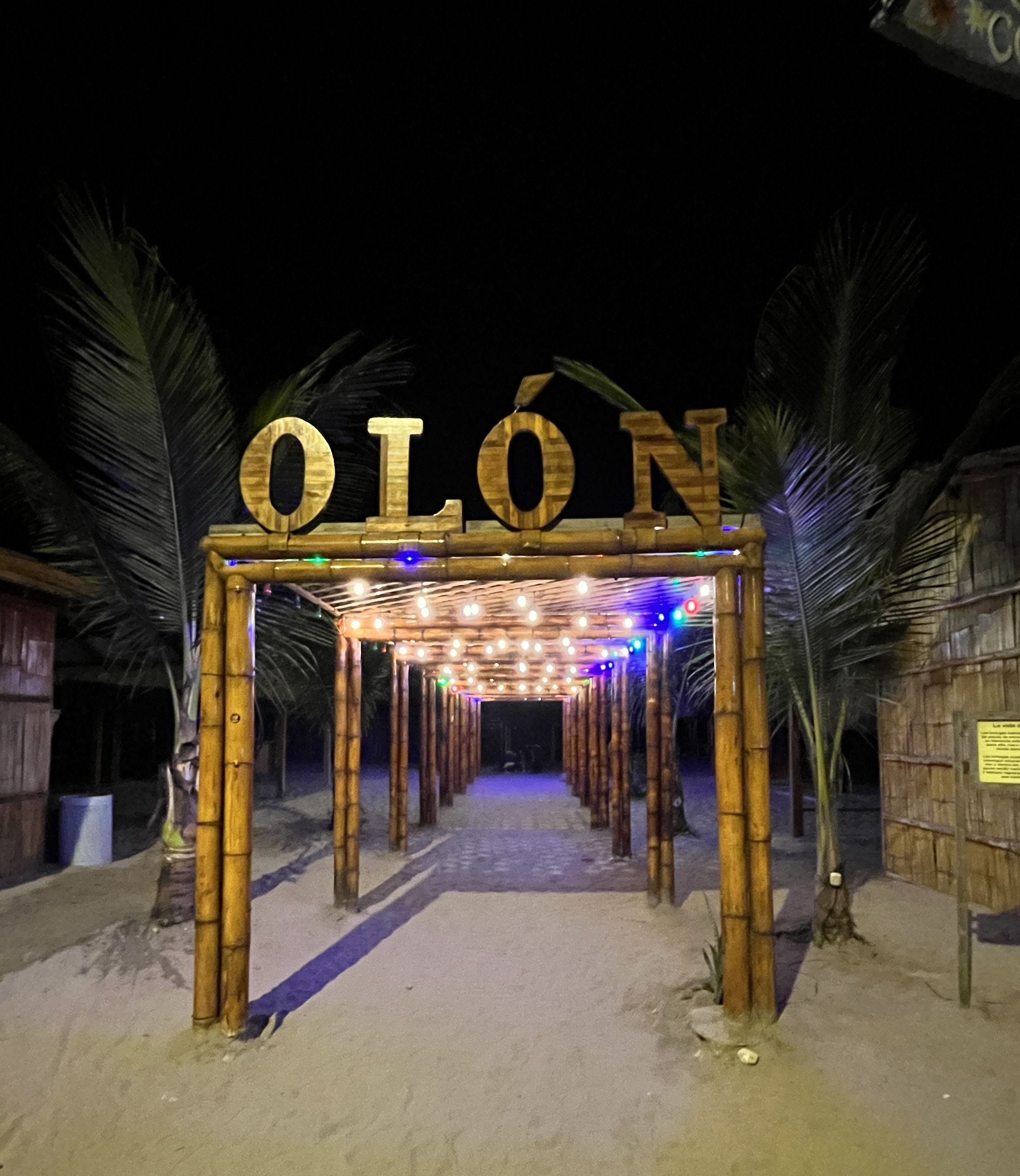
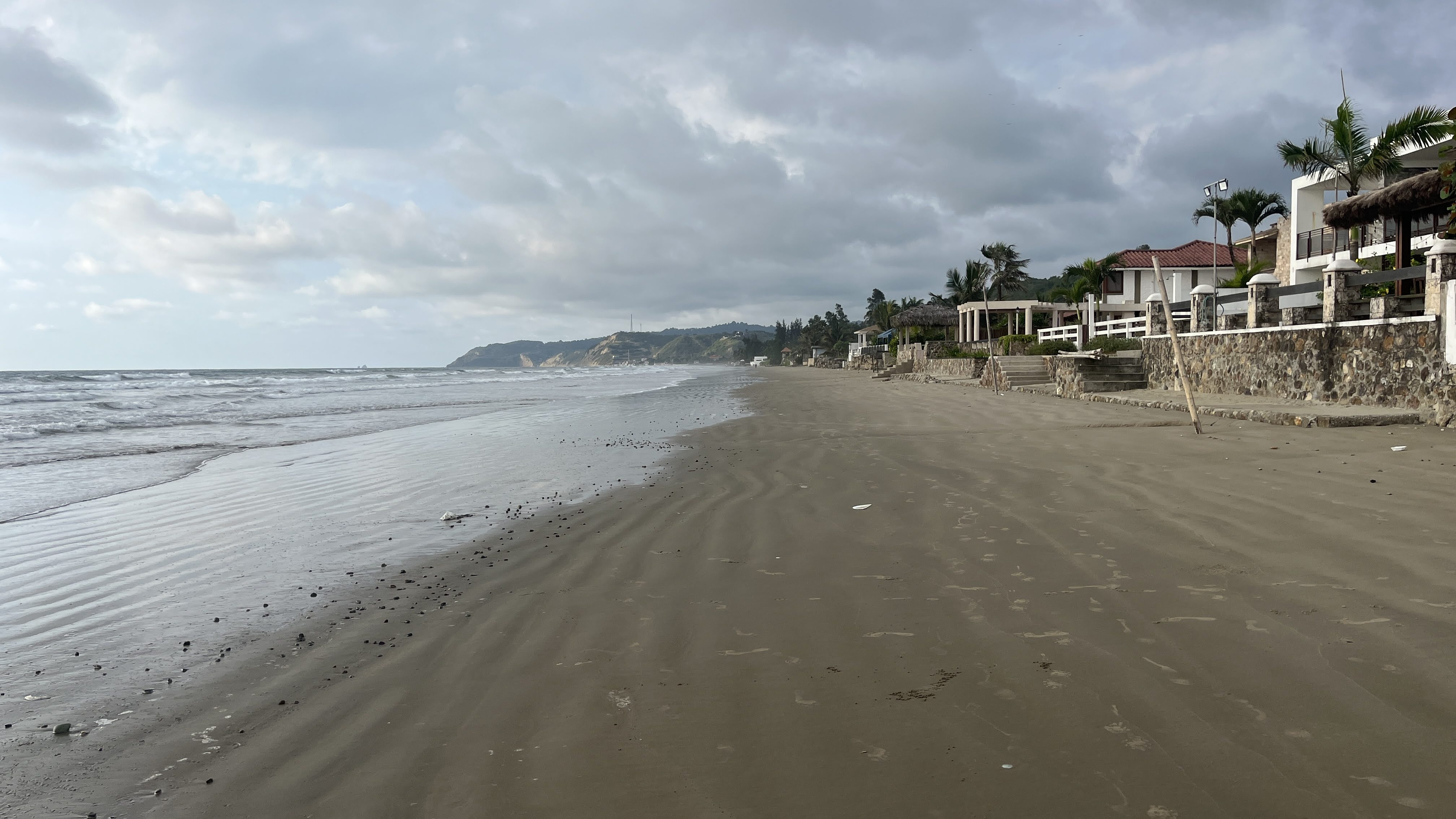
- A tourist sign on the beach Olón Beach
- Interactive map of Olón
- Country: Ecuador
- Province: Santa Elena
- Canton: Santa Elena
- Time zone: UTC-5 (ECT)

Olón is a small coastal town in Ecuador located in the province of Santa Elena, about 180 kilometers northwest of Guayaquil.

Previously a small fishing village for years, the town now has a small downtown with hotels and restaurants as a result of the tourist boom in nearby Montañita, about four kilometers to the south on Ecuador Highway 15.
