= Jorge Escala =

Ecuadorian politician

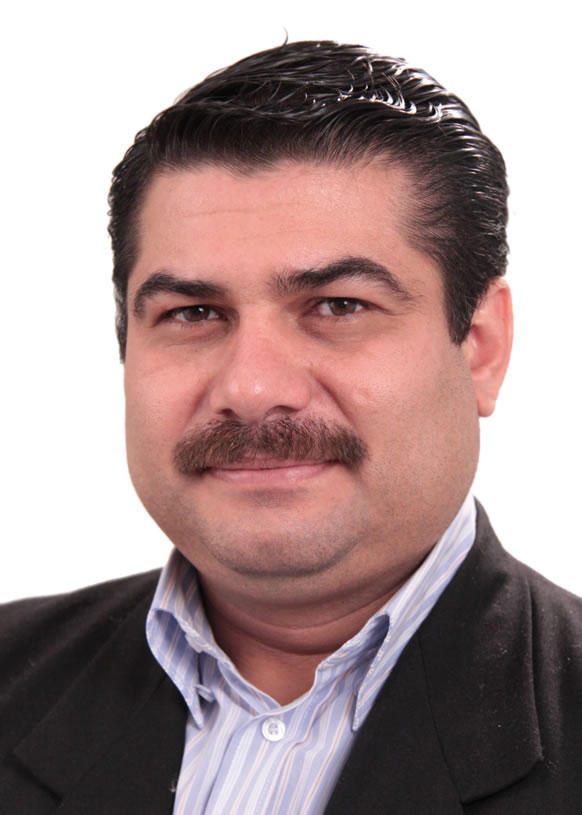
Escala in 2012

Jorge Elías Escala Zambrano (born 8 January 1970) is an Ecuadorian academic and politician who ran for President of Ecuador in the 2025 general election. Escala is a member of the Popular Unity Party. He served as a member of the National Assembly from 2009 to 2013. During his time in the assembly, he gained national prominence for accusing the United Nations Convention on the Law of the Sea of "attacking Ecuadorian sovereignty".

Escala was born in Ventanas, Ecuador in January 1970. He moved to Guayaquil to study at Colegio Nacional Vicente Rocafuerte.

In May 2024, Escala registered as a pre-candidate for the Popular Unity Party nomination for President of Ecuador in the 2025 general election.
