= Jimmy Jairala =

Ecuadorian politician

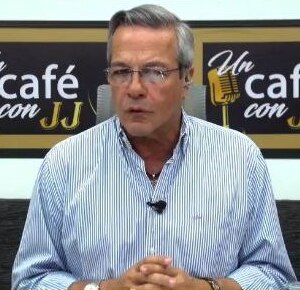
Jimmy Jairala in 2022.

Jaime Antonio Jairala Vallazza, more commonly known as Jimmy Jairala (born 26 September 1957) is an Ecuadorian politician who is leader of the Democratic Center Movement.

== Early life ==
Jimmy Jairala Vallazza was born on September 26, 1957 in Guayaquil. He is the first son of Eduardo Jairala and Norma Vallazza. He comes from a family of Lebanese migrants.

He has six children.

== Political career ==
In 2012 he founded the Democratic Center.

He was Prefect of Guayas from 2008 to 2018. He was a candidate in the 2019 and 2023 municipal elections in Guayaquil but was not elected.

In July 2024, Jairala registered as a pre-candidate for the Democratic Center nomination for President of Ecuador in the upcoming 2025 general election. However the following month, he withdrew from the election.
