= Dallyana Passailaigue =

Ecuadorian media personality, athlete, and politician

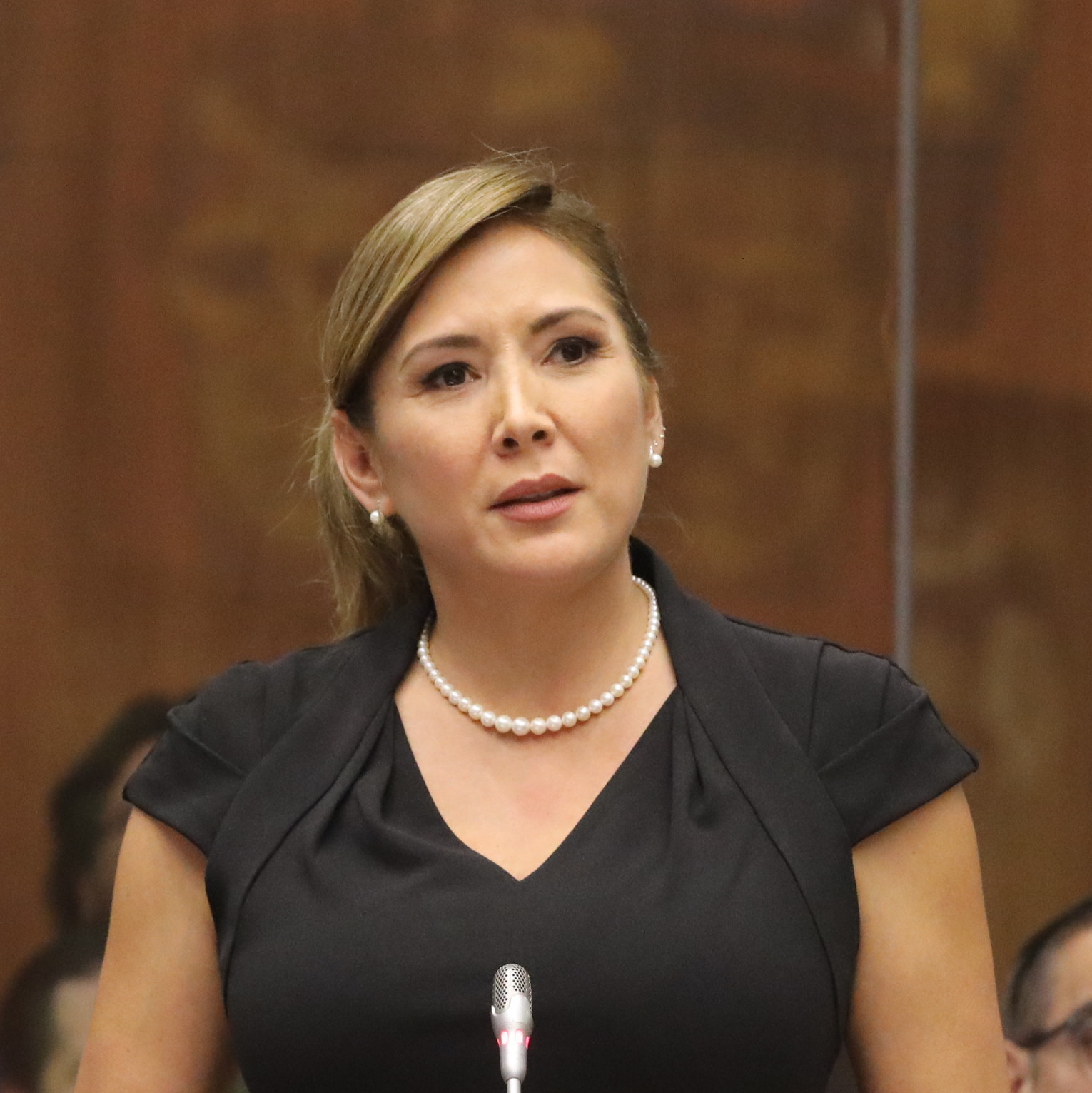
- in 2023 at the National Assembly

Member of the National Assembly of Ecuador
- Incumbent
- Assumed office May 14, 2017
- Constituency: Guayas Province District 3

Personal details
- Born: Dallyana Marianela Passailaigue Manosalvas; October 27, 1980 (age 44); Guayaquil, Ecuador
- Political party: Social Christian Party
- Spouse: Alberto Jalil (2018–present)
- Parent: Roberto Passailaigue (father)
- Occupation: Presenter, actress, athlete, politician

Dallyana Marianela Passailaigue Manosalvas (born October 27, 1980) is an Ecuadorian media personality, athlete, and politician. She is currently a member of the National Assembly representing Guayas Province District 3. She ran for Vice President of Ecuador in the 2025 general election.

== Early life ==
Dallyana Passailaigue was born in Guayaquil on October 27, 1980, the daughter of former Education Minister Roberto Passailaigue. She has a degree in commercial engineering.

She was director of tourism for the Prefecture of Guayas in 2005.

She appeared on the RedTeleSistema sports program Copa.

On Ecuavisa, she was a presenter on the show Así somos. She left this position to study acting in Madrid, at the Jorge Elines Interpretation School, and then in Italy where she studied commedia dell'arte. Afterward, she returned to the network to be part of the Televistazo newscast, where she presented the sports news segment.

== Artistic and sports career ==
Passailaigue has appeared in several Ecuadorian television and film productions. Her first acting role was on the TC Televisión comedy series JSI – Jonathan Sangrera. Under the direction of Peky Andino, she appeared in the film series Secretos, with some episodes broadcast by Ecuavisa.

In 2004 she entered the Ironman Triathlon in Austria, representing Ecuador and placing seventh. She was the first Ecuadorian woman to participate in the competition, and obtained the best rating for a Latin American woman. Passailaigue is also a motorcycle racer. She participated in the 2015 Copa Loxa competition at the Yahuarcocha race track in Imbabura Province, finishing in third place.

== Political life ==
In the 2017 legislative election, Passailaigue won a seat in the National Assembly representing Guayas Province for the Social Christian Party.

Before the elections in February 2021, she requested unpaid leave from the assembly so that she could take part in the elections. 42 other members also made the same request including Mónica Alemán, Wilma Andrade, Esther Cuesta Santana and Verónica Arias. During her absence her job would be carried out by her substitute.

In May 2023, the President of Ecuador Guillermo Lasso brought in an unusual constitution clause (number 148) known as Mutual death when he knew that he was about to be impeached. This required all of the National Assembly members to stand for re-election. Following her restoration to the assembly Passailaigue was voted in as a member of the Assembly's Commission into Education, Culture, Science, Technology, Innovation and Ancestral Knowledge. The other members were Mauricio Zambrano, Jahiren Noriega, Ana María Raffo, Nathaly Morillo, Zolanda Pluas, Cecilia Baltazar, Hernán Zapata and Juan Carlos Camacho.

In August 2024, Passailaigue registered to run for Vice President of Ecuador in the 2025 general election under the Christian Social Party ticket alongside Assembly President Henry Kronfle.
