= Carlos Rabascall =

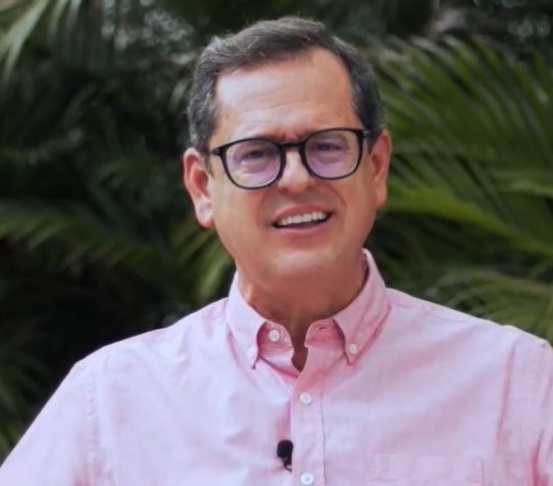
- Rabascall in 2021
- Born: September 3, 1960 (age 65); Guayaquil, Ecuador
- Occupations: Journalist, commercial engineer
- Political party: Democratic Left (since 2024)

Carlos Xavier Rabascall Salazar (born September 3, 1960) is an Ecuadorian journalist, commercial engineer, businessman, and political consultant who is running for President of Ecuador in the 2025 general election. He previously ran for vice president in the 2021 general election.

== Early life ==
Rabascall was born in Guayaquil on September 3, 1960 into a middle-class family. Because of the effects of the drug called Thalidomide, which affected the formation of the newborn, he was born without a leg, a situation that generated a "hard childhood because of discrimination" he explained later.

Rabascall completed his basic training at Colegio La Salle and later graduated as a commercial engineer at the Universidad Católica de Santiago de Guayaquil. He has also taken courses in Finance at IDE and participated in the Governance and Political Management Program of the Catholic University of Guayaquil under the auspices of George Washington University.

== Political career ==
In 2017, he was a member of the Front for Transparency and the Fight Against Corruption, a body in charge of proposing policies to prevent corruption in the public and private sectors. In December 2020, it was confirmed that he was part of the Union for Hope coalition together with Andrés Arauz, in the Ecuadorian presidential elections.

In July 2024, Rabascall registered as a pre-candidate for President of Ecuador in the upcoming 2025 general election.
