= AMIGO Movement =

Political party in Ecuador

AMIGO Movement Movimiento AMIGO
- President: Jouber Antonio Azúa Alvia
- Registered: 2019
- Headquarters: Quito
- Membership: 225,822 (2019)
- Ideology: Big tent Social liberalism
- Slogan: "A Friend for Our People"
- National Assembly: 1 / 137
- Provincial Prefects: 0 / 23
- Mayors: 2 / 221

Website
- https://movimientoamigo.com

The AMIGO Movement (Spanish: Movimiento AMIGO; acronym for Acción Movilizadora Independiente Generando Oportunidades, AMIGO) is an Ecuadorian political party. It was founded in the province of Manabí by former National Assembly member Daniel Mendoza under the name MEJOR (Emprendimiento, Justicia, Oportunidades Reales; Entrepreneurship, Justice, Real Opportunities). In 2019, it was renamed MEJOR EC and obtained official registration as a nationwide political organization. For the 2021 general elections, it adopted its current name, Movimiento AMIGO, and was assigned electoral list number 16.

In December 2025, Daniel Mendoza permanently left the organization and stepped down as president of the movement. His departure followed the judicial proceedings he faced and came amid requests from members and supporters for him to sever his ties with the organization in order to make way for a new institutional phase. The movement subsequently began a process of renewing its national leadership, appointing Jouber Antonio Azúa Alvia as its president.
