= Christian Social Party (Ecuador) =

Political party in Ecuador

Christian Social Party Partido Social Cristiano
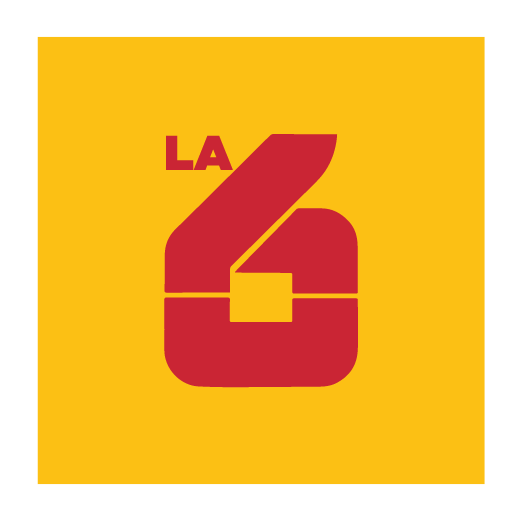
- Abbreviation: PSC
- Leader: Jaime Nebot
- President: Alfredo Serrano Valladares
- Founders: Camilo Ponce Enríquez; Sixto Durán Ballén
- Founded: 13 November 1951; 73 years ago
- Headquarters: Quito, Ecuador
- Youth wing: La Cantera de la 6
- Membership (2022): 161,669
- Ideology: Christian humanism; Christian democracy; Social conservatism
- Political position: Centre-right
- Regional affiliation: Union of Latin American Parties
- Colors: Gold; Red
- Seats in the National Assembly: 4 / 151
- Provincial Prefects: 2 / 23
- Mayors: 73 / 221

Website
- http://la6.org/

The Christian Social Party (Spanish: Partido Social Cristiano, PSC) is a centre-right political party in Ecuador.

The party was founded in 1951 under the name of Christian Social Movement (Movimiento Social Cristiano) by Camilo Ponce Enríquez, who was Ecuador's president from 1956 to 1960, and Sixto Durán Ballén. It was initially focused on Quito. Since the 1980s, however, the party's popularity is more present on the coastal areas, particularly around Ecuador's economic center and most populous city, Guayaquil, and in coastal provinces, such as Guayas, El Oro, Los Rios, and Manabi, which constitute about half of the country's population. However, as a sign of deep regional divide on politics, the party has little power in the Andean region. Thus, while holding all major positions in Guayas and Guayaquil, the PSC has not held the presidential office since the presidency of León Febres Cordero (1984–88).

In 1978, the party's centrist and leftist wing split-off to form the centre Popular Democracy party under Osvaldo Hurtado, who was the country's president from 1981 to 1984. After Febres Cordero's faction inside the PSC succeeded in appointing Jaime Nebot as the party's presidential candidate, Sixto Durán Ballén and his supporters left the party to form the more right-wing Republican Union. Eventually, Durán was elected president for the period 1992–1996. Nebot was the party's presidential candidate again in 1996. He won first place in the first round with 28% of the vote, but lost in the runoff with 46% of the vote to Abdalá Bucaram.

The PSC candidate, Xavier Neira, won 12.2 percent of the vote in the 2002 presidential election. Its candidate in the 2006 presidential election was Cynthia Viteri. She garnered 9.91 percent of the overall votes cast and failed to enter into the second round of runoff voting. Neira and Viteri both came in 5th place. At the 2006 legislative elections, the party won 13 of the 100 seats, much less than last period.

After León Febres Cordero's death, Jaime Nebot took over the leadership of the party, and split it into a coalition with his provincial brother party called "Madera de Guerrero", an allusion to a song of the folklore of Guayaquil with the same name. This coalition is the third force in the National Assembly (parliament). For the 2021 general elections, the party teamed up with Creating Opportunities with Guillermo Lasso and Lasso was ultimately elected in the run-off against Andrés Arauz.

For the 2023 Ecuadorian general election, the PSC supported the candidacy of Jan Topić. For the second round, the party announced they will support the candidacy of Daniel Noboa, because the party "has never supported Correism". The party obtained less than 1% of the vote in the 2025 presidential elections. This failure is due to the electoral competition of Daniel Noboa and corruption cases.

== Election results ==
=== National Assembly elections ===
Election	Leader	Votes	%	Seats	+/–
1979	Sixto Durán-Ballén	123,411	8.58	3 / 69	New
1984	Sixto Durán-Ballén	361,755	17.85	9 / 70	▲6
1988	León Febres Cordero	310,950	11.25	8 / 72	▼1
1992	León Febres Cordero	753,452	23.39	21 / 77	▲13
1996	León Febres Cordero	1,069,977	30.40	27 / 82	▲6
1998	León Febres Cordero	839,567	23.80	28 / 121	▲1
2002	León Febres Cordero	823,442	21.49	24 / 100	▼4
2006	León Febres Cordero	477,804	15.29	13 / 100	▼11
2009	Jaime Nebot	8,559,831	13.28	11 / 124	▼2
2013	Jaime Nebot	7,901,315	8.99	6 / 137	▼5
2017	Jaime Nebot	1,295,768	15.90	15 / 137	▲9
2021	Jaime Nebot	780,541	9.73	18 / 137	▲3
2023	Jaime Nebot	996,206	11.90	14 / 137	▼4
2025	Jaime Nebot	288,545	3.17	4 / 151	▼10

=== Constituent Assembly elections ===
Election	Votes	%	Party leader	Seats	+/–
2007	León Febres Cordero	156,840	3.88	5 / 130	New
