= Advance (Ecuador) =

Advance Avanza
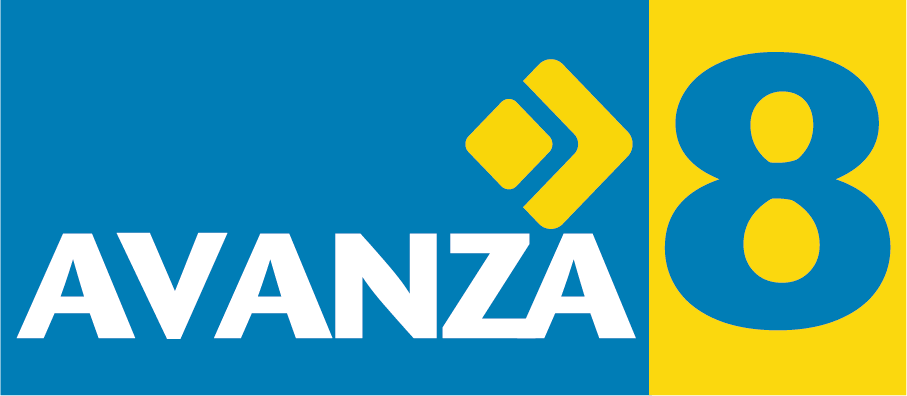
- President: Javier Orti
- Secretary-General: Antonio Orbe
- Founder: Ramiro González Jaramillo
- Founded: 8 March 2012
- Registered: 22 March 2012
- Split from: Democratic Left
- Headquarters: Quito
- Membership (2016): 180,191
- Ideology: Neoliberalism
- Political position: Right-wing (since 2017); Big tent (2012–2017)
- National affiliation: Frente UNIDOS (2014–2015); La Unidad (2016); Actuemos (2023)
- Colours: Blue; Yellow
- Slogan: "Advance a new face" (Spanish: "Avanza un nuevo rostro")
- National Assembly: 0 / 151
- Prefects: 0 / 23
- Mayors: 15 / 221

Website
- Facebook page

The Advance Political Party (Spanish: Partido Político Avanza), also known simply as Avanza, is an Ecuadorian political party, founded in 2012 as a personal political platform of Ramiro González Jaramillo, as a personal political platform. After González fled the country in 2017 amid corruption scandals, the party was restructured to the right-wing under new leadership.

== History ==
=== Party under Ramiro González ===
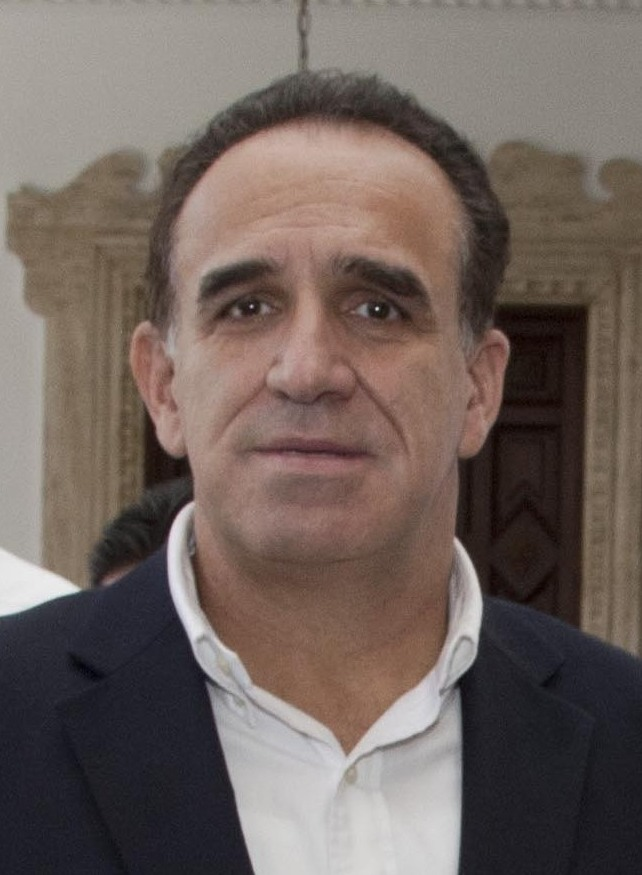
Ramiro González Jaramillo, founder, leader, and president of Avanza from 2012 until his flight from the country in 2017.

Following the decline of the Democratic Left, a faction of the party, led by Ramiro González Jaramillo, founded a new party, called Advance, with the goal of updating the doctrinal principles of the ID's social democracy to the current context, although in practice, the nascent party served as González's personal political platform. As Ramiro González was at that time an ally of Rafael Correa's government, the party supported Correa's re-election in the 2013 presidential election, while in the legislative election it participated with its own candidates, winning 5 seats in the National Assembly.

In November 2013, the party suffered its first crisis, which led to hundreds of disaffiliations due to disputes over candidates for the 2014 local elections. In those elections, Avanza won 36 mayoralties and the prefecture of Imbabura, making it the second-largest political force in the country in terms of the number of elected mayors. It subsequently formed the ruling coalition Frente UNIDOS (United Front), until González's departure from the Correa administration, after which Avanza left the coalition in April 2015.

Ramiro González and the party went into opposition, with González participating in a January 2016 political meeting of opposition politicians led by Christian Social Party leader Jaime Nebot. Following that meeting, Avanza joined La Unidad, a political coalition headed by Nebot; however, in October 2016, the party abandoned that alliance, withdrawing from the 2017 presidential election. Avanza did participate in the parallel legislative election, with Ramiro González heading the national list; however, in this election, the party obtained only 2.2% of the vote, failing to gain any seats in parliament. In the second round of the presidential election, González and Avanza supported Guillermo Lasso, which led to a new internal split within the party.

=== Post-González restructuring ===
In August 2017, several corruption scandals involving Ramiro González erupted. On 5 August 2017, his collaborator was arrested for alleged illicit enrichment, and on August 18, the Prosecutor's Office carried out an operation to capture González, accused of tax evasion. A pretrial detention order was issued against him, and his properties and Avanza headquarters were raided. González fled the country and has since been a fugitive from Ecuadorian justice. Following the escape of its main figure, several provincial leaders and former candidates left the party, and there were mass disaffiliations of members in several provinces across the country. As for the leadership, Javier Pincay took over as interim president.

In order to recover its image, the party held a national assembly in November 2017, electing Álvaro Castillo, then mayor of Ibarra, as national director. By June 2018, the party announced the expulsion of González, pointing to a restructuring ahead of the 2019 local elections. In these elections, the party achieved the re-election of the prefect of Imbabura, but won only eight mayoralties, the vast majority of the elected candidates were only part of electoral alliances, and did not belong to Avanza. In the 2021 presidential election, the party backed the candidacy of Isidro Romero, while in the legislative election, the list was headed by Javier Orti. Romero obtained sixth place, with 1.86% of the vote, while in the parliamentary election, Avanza obtained two seats.

Although the party stated that it did not support any candidate in the runoff of 2021 presidential election, after the election of Guillermo Lasso, Avanza became an ally of the ruling party. Thus, the party's representatives in the National Assembly became part of the governing bloc. In September 2021, Javier Orti was elected as National President of the party, consolidating his leadership within Avanza, which had been forged from the void left by the flight of Ramiro González. Despite its limited political representation, the party was one of the closest allies of Guillermo Lasso's government, supporting the constitutional referendum promoted by the ruling party. In the 2023 local elections, held alongside the consultation, Avanza won 18 mayoralties, but did not win any prefectures. In parliament, through Assembly member Pedro Velasco, Avanza ratified its support for the government, defending it in the impeachment trial of Guillermo Lasso.

Facing his impending impeachment, Lasso dissolved parliament and called for special elections. In snap presidential election, the party decided to support Otto Sonnenholzner's candidacy, along with the SUMA Party, in a coalition called "Actuemos". Sonnenholzner won 7.06% of the vote, placing him in fifth place. In the legislative election, the coalition won eight seats. In the presidential runoff, Sonnenholzner and Avanza supported Daniel Noboa, who was elected.

=== History since 2023 ===
Shortly after the 2023 elections, the Actuemos alliance with SUMA collapsed, leaving Avanza with two representatives in the National Assembly. Ahead of the 2024 constitutional referendum, called by the Noboa administration, the party decided to support the ruling party, registering to campaign for the Yes vote.

For the 2025 presidential election, Avanza supported the candidacy of Luis Felipe Tillería, while a dissident faction of Avanza led by several provincial leaders decided to support the SUMA candidacy of Jan Topić, who was however disqualified before the election. In the election, Luis Felipe Tillería won 0.32% of the votes, while Avanza did not win a single seat in the National Assembly.

== Election results ==
=== Presidential elections ===
Election	Party candidate	Votes	%	Votes	%	Result
Election	Party candidate	First round		Second round		Result
2013	Supported Rafael Correa (PAIS)	4,918,482	57.17%			Elected ✓
2017	Did not participate					
2021	Isidro Romero	172,714	1.86%			Lost ✗
2023	Supported Daniel Noboa (ADN)	2,315,296	23.47%	5,251,695	51.83%	Elected ✓
2025	Luis Felipe Tillería	33,239	0.32%	TBD	TBD	Lost ✗

=== National Assembly elections ===
Election	National list leader	Votes	%	Seats	+/–
2013	Jhon Argudo	214,909	2.92%	5 / 116	New
2017	Ramiro González	175,213	2.15%	0 / 137	▼5
2021	Javier Orti	154,529	1.93%	2 / 137	▲2
2023	Karina Subía (Actuemos)	377,953	4.51%	2 / 137	0
2025	No national list	–	–	0 / 151	▼2
