= 2023 Ecuadorian Yasuní National Park oil exploitation referendum =

Yasuní popular consultation
- 20 August 2023
- Do you agree with the Ecuadorian government keeping the ITT crude, known as block 43, underground indefinitely?

Results
Choice	Votes	%
Yes	5,541,585	54.11%
No	3,859,507	37.68%
Blank votes	841,185	8.21%
Valid votes	10,242,277	94.69%
Invalid votes	574,471	5.31%
Total votes	10,816,748	100.00%
Registered voters/turnout	13,045,553	82.92%
- Yes: 50–60% 60–70% No: 50–60%

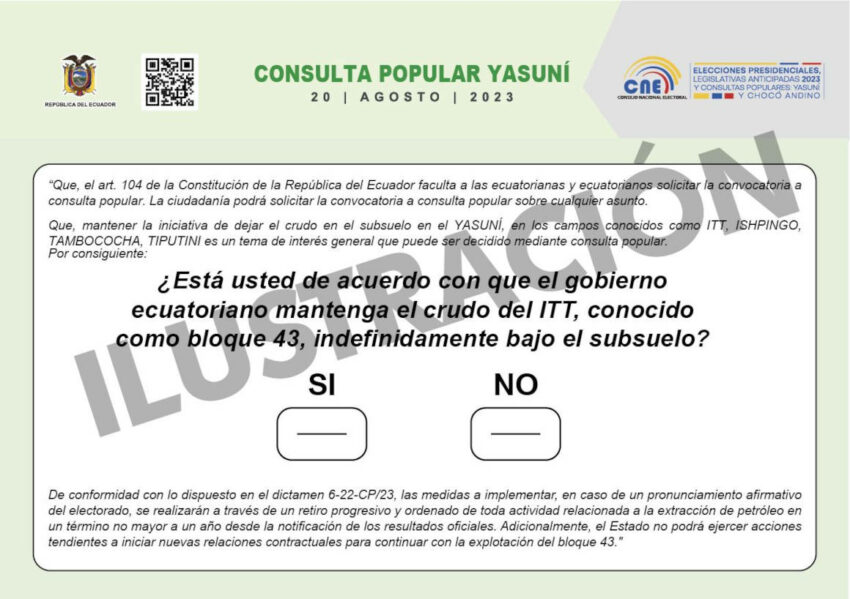
Ballot used in the referendum

Yasuní National Park (green) on a map of Ecuador

A referendum on banning oil exploitation in the Yasuní National Park was held in Ecuador on 20 August 2023 alongside general elections. If the proposal was accepted, a progressive withdrawal of all activities related to oil extraction would occur within one year from the announcement of the official results, and the state would not be able to take action intending to initiate new contracts to continue oil exploration in the block. The referendum was a popular initiative demanded by indigenous communities for more than ten years before being finally validated by the Constitutional Court in May 2023.

The proposal was approved. The choice was seen as a blow to President Guillermo Lasso, who had advocated for drilling. State oil company Petroecuador will have to dismantle its drilling operations in the area in the coming months.

== Political campaign ==
The positions presented by the various political and social organizations are as follows:

=== Support Yes vote ===
- Popular Unity
- Socialist Party – Broad Front of Ecuador
- Democracia Sí
- National Union of Educators
- General Union of Ecuadorian Workers
- Confederation of Indigenous Nationalities of Ecuador

=== Support No vote ===
- AMIGO Movement
- Confederación Intercultural de Pueblos y Nacionalidades del Ecuador Amaru

== Position of presidential candidates ==
The campaigns of Jan Topić, Yaku Pérez, Daniel Noboa Azín, Christian Zurita and Otto Sonnenholzner have indicated they support a yes vote in the referendum, while the campaigns of Bolívar Armijos, Xavier Hervas and Luisa González have indicated support for a no vote.

== Opinion polls ==
Date	Source	Sample	Yes	No
06/07/2023	Comunicaliza	3,314	31%	21%
02/07/2023	Informe Confidencial	-	52%	37%
26/06/2023	Negocios & Estrategias	3,524	40%	33%

== Results ==
Choice	Votes	%
For	5,541,585	58.95
Against	3,859,507	41.05
Total	9,401,092	100.00
Valid votes	9,401,092	86.91
Invalid votes	574,471	5.31
Blank votes	841,185	7.78
Total votes	10,816,748	100.00
Registered voters/turnout	13,045,553	82.92
Source: CNE, DD

== See also ==
- Yasuní-ITT Initiative
