= Pedro José Freile =

Ecuadorian lawyer (born 1972)

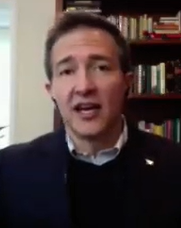
Freile in 2020

Pedro José Freile Vallejo (born 18 January 1972) is an Ecuadorian lawyer and politician who is running for President of Ecuador in the 2025 general election. He previously ran for president in the 2021 general election. Freile was born in Quito, Ecuador.

== Early career ==
Freile served as Director of the Inter-American Development Bank part of the Ecuador Division from 2004 to 2005.

Freile was a member of the board of directors of the Society for the Fight Against Cancer (SOLCA) from 2013 to 2015. Prior to entering politics, he was a member of the Quinto Poder group, which were actively protesting the presidency of Rafael Correa.

== 2021 presidential campaign ==
In 2020, he became leader of the AMIGO Movement political party prior to launching his presidential campaign. During his campaign, commentators positively noted his debate performances and gained support despite running a small campaign. However, he came in fifth place in the first round of the 2021 election. He subsequently endorsed Guillermo Lasso in the run-off election.

In 2022, he left the AMIGO Movement after reports that the party had pushed back against Freile.

== Post-presidential campaign ==
In 2022, he unsuccessfully ran for Mayor of Quito under the PSE-SUMA alliance.

Prior to President Guillermo Lasso's dissolution of the National Assembly in May 2023, Freile expressed interest in running for the presidency again in 2025, however he opted to run for Jan Topić's running mate in the 2023 election until the National Electoral Council disqualified him due to a mandate ruling gender parity in candidacies. He later became an advisor to Topic's campaign instead.

== 2025 presidential campaign ==
In July 2024, Freile registered as a pre-candidate for the SUMA Party presidential nomination in the 2025 general election.
