= 2023 Ecuadorian general election =

- 20 August 2023; 15 October 2023 (runoff)
- Presidential election
- Turnout: 82.92% (first round); 82.36% (second round)
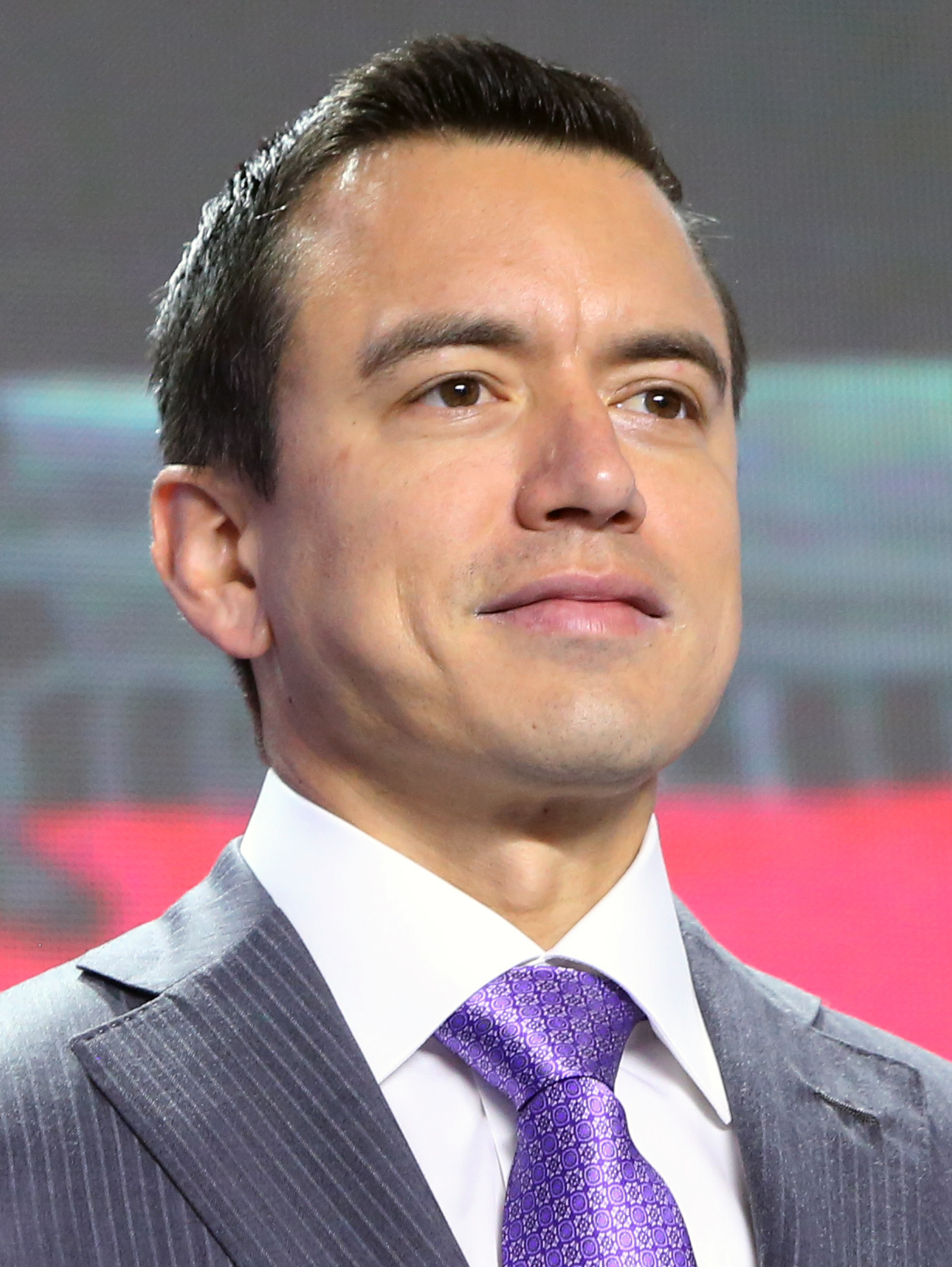

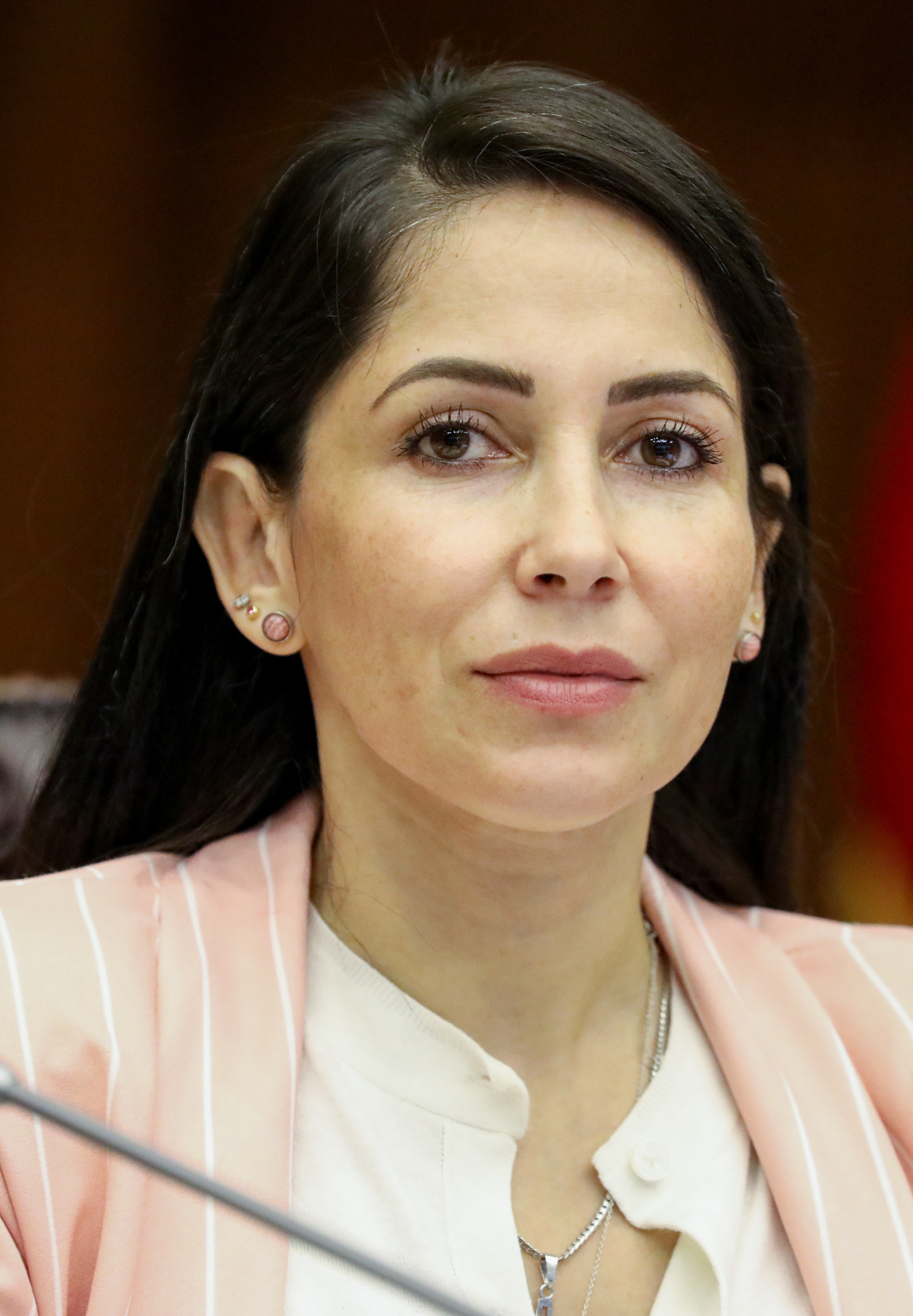
Candidate	Daniel Noboa	Luisa González
Party	ADN	RC
Running mate	Verónica Abad	Andrés Arauz
Votes	5,251,695	4,880,525
Percentage	51.83%	48.17%
President before election
Guillermo Lasso
CREO
Elected President
Daniel Noboa
ADN
- Parliamentary election
- All 137 seats in the National Assembly; 69 seats needed for a majority
Party	Leader	Vote %	Seats	+/–
RC	Pierina Correa	39.88	52	+10
Construye	Patricio Carrillo	20.21	29	+28
ADN	Valentina Centeno	14.77	14	New
PSC	Henry Kronfle	11.81	14	−4
Actuemos	Karina Subía	4.46	8	New
PSP	Lucio Gutiérrez	3.13	3	+2
CQSP	Bruno Segovia	2.85	3	New
RETO	Raúl Chavez	1.68	2	+2
AMIGO	Raúl Chavez	1.20	1	New
Pachakutik	Marlon Santi	–	4	−23
CD	Jimmy Jairala	–	1	−6
Local lists	–	–	6	+3
This lists parties that won seats. See the complete results below.
National Assembly President before	National Assembly President after
Virgilio Saquicela (until dissolution); CREO	Henry Kronfle; PSC

Special general elections were held in Ecuador on 20 August 2023 to elect the President of Ecuador, members of the National Assembly, and to decide on two referendums. The elections were triggered by the invocation of muerte cruzada, which dissolved the National Assembly on 17 May 2023. A run-off election was held on 15 October 2023 to elect the President after no candidate secured the required threshold to win in the first round. Incumbent president Guillermo Lasso was eligible for a second term, but he announced on 18 May that he would not seek re-election in response to his impeachment.

The officials elected—to both the executive and legislative branches—served the remainder of the current presidential and legislative terms (2021–2025), beginning on 25 November 2023. A regular election for a full four-year term happened in early 2025. A national referendum on oil exploitation in the Yasuní National Park and a local referendum on metallic mining in the Chocó Andino area were held on the same day. The assassination of presidential candidate Fernando Villavicencio—11 days before the first round—made international headlines.

Advancing to the 15 October run-off, Luisa González of the Citizen Revolution Movement secured first place with 33% of the vote, while Daniel Noboa of the National Democratic Action came in second with 24%. Noboa's second-place finish was considered surprising and an upset, with his debate performance seen as a key factor in his rise in popularity. Noboa ultimately defeated González in the runoff election, securing 52% of the vote, a result similar to Guillermo Lasso's victory in 2021. At 35 years old, he became the youngest president in Ecuador's history.

== Background ==
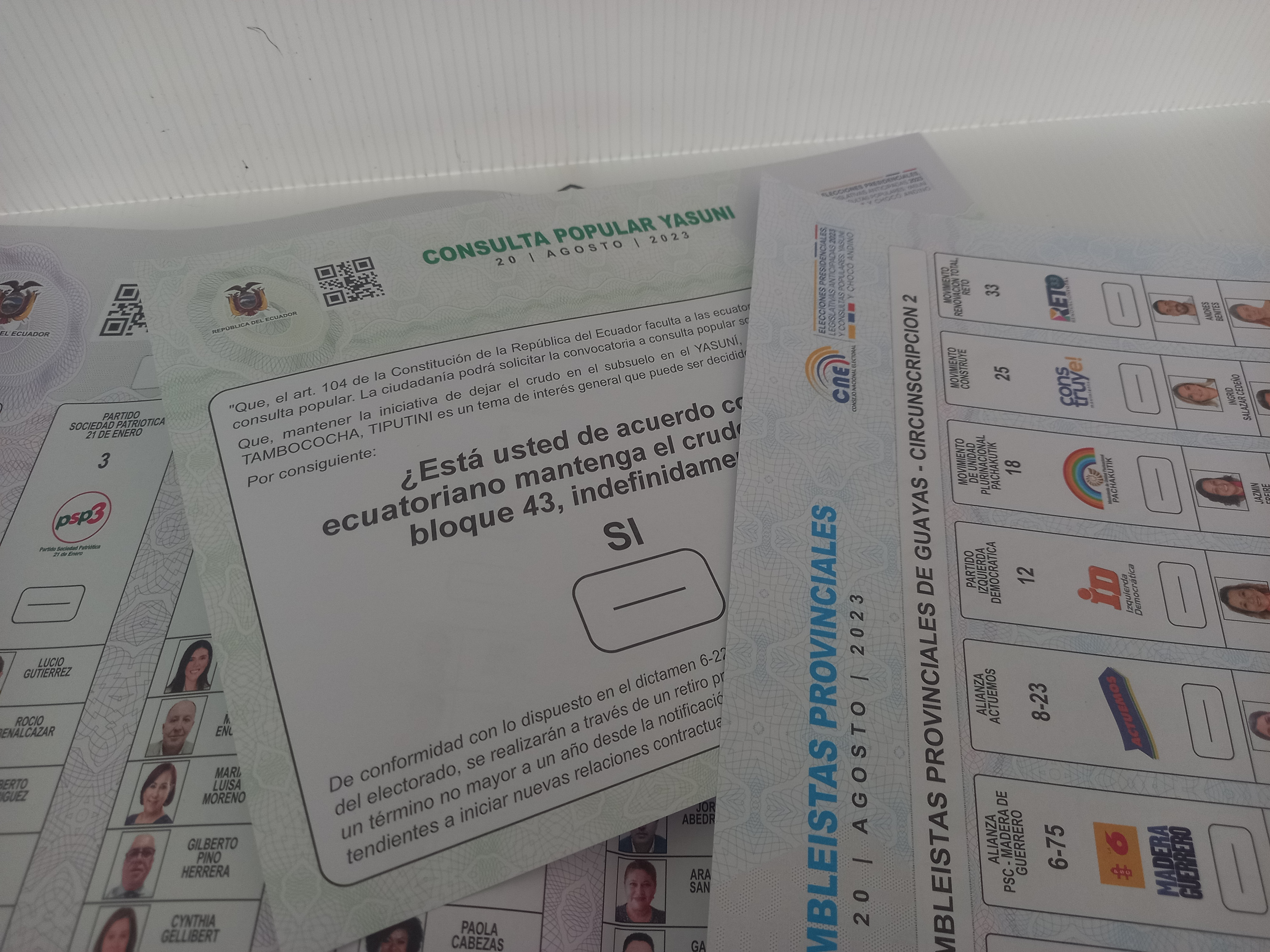
Voting sheets used for the general elections.

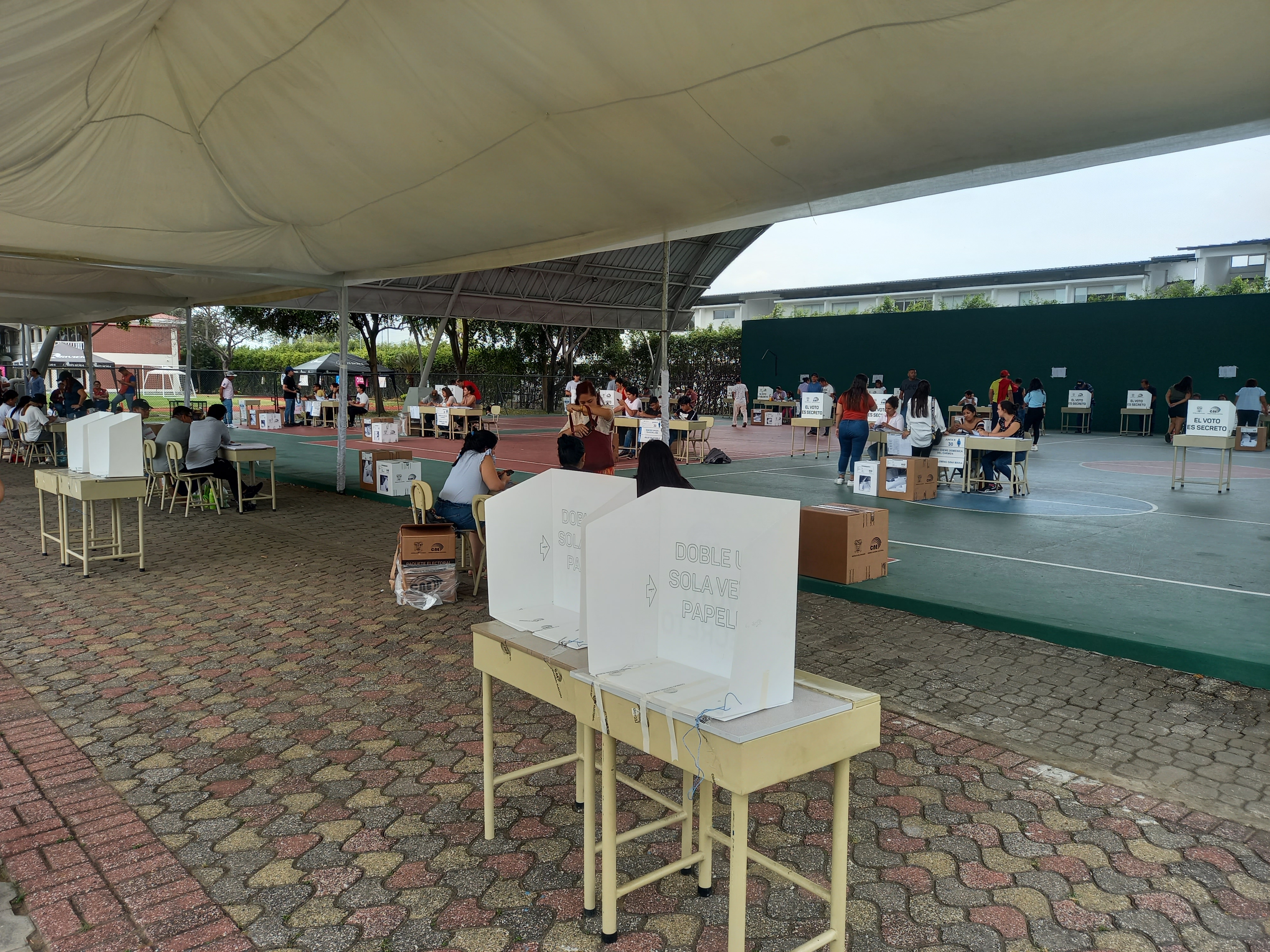
Voting stations used for the elections.

On 17 May 2023, a day after he presented his defense in an impeachment process against him, President Lasso invoked the muerte cruzada mechanism provided for in Article 148 of the 2008 Constitution to dissolve the National Assembly, bringing forward legislative and presidential elections.

On 18 May, Diana Atamaint, the president of the National Electoral Council (CNE), announced 20 August 2023 as the tentative date for the legislative election and the first round of the presidential vote. The CNE had until 24 May to finalize the electoral calendar.

On 13 June, Luisa González was en route to register her presidential candidacy with the National Electoral Council with her supporters and president of the Citizen Revolution movement, Marcela Aguiñaga, when they were attacked with pepper spray and tear gas by the National Police. She was treated at a Quito medical center after flushing her eyes from the pepper spray. The National Police claimed to have used chemical agents to protect security and public order because of the hostile behavior of González's supporters.

Less than two weeks before the election, on 9 August 2023, candidate Fernando Villavicencio was assassinated after a campaign rally in Quito at the age of 59. He is the first presidential candidate to have been assassinated in the country since Abdon Calderon Muñoz's assassination in 1978. The assassination of Villavicencio made international news, prompting condemnation of the attack and condolences by foreign countries as well as the Organization of American States, who called for an investigation. He was replaced on the ballot by a fellow journalist, Christian Zurita, keeping Villavicencio's running mate Andrea González.

The general election has been perceived to be largely overshadowed by narco politics and violent crime.

== Electoral system ==
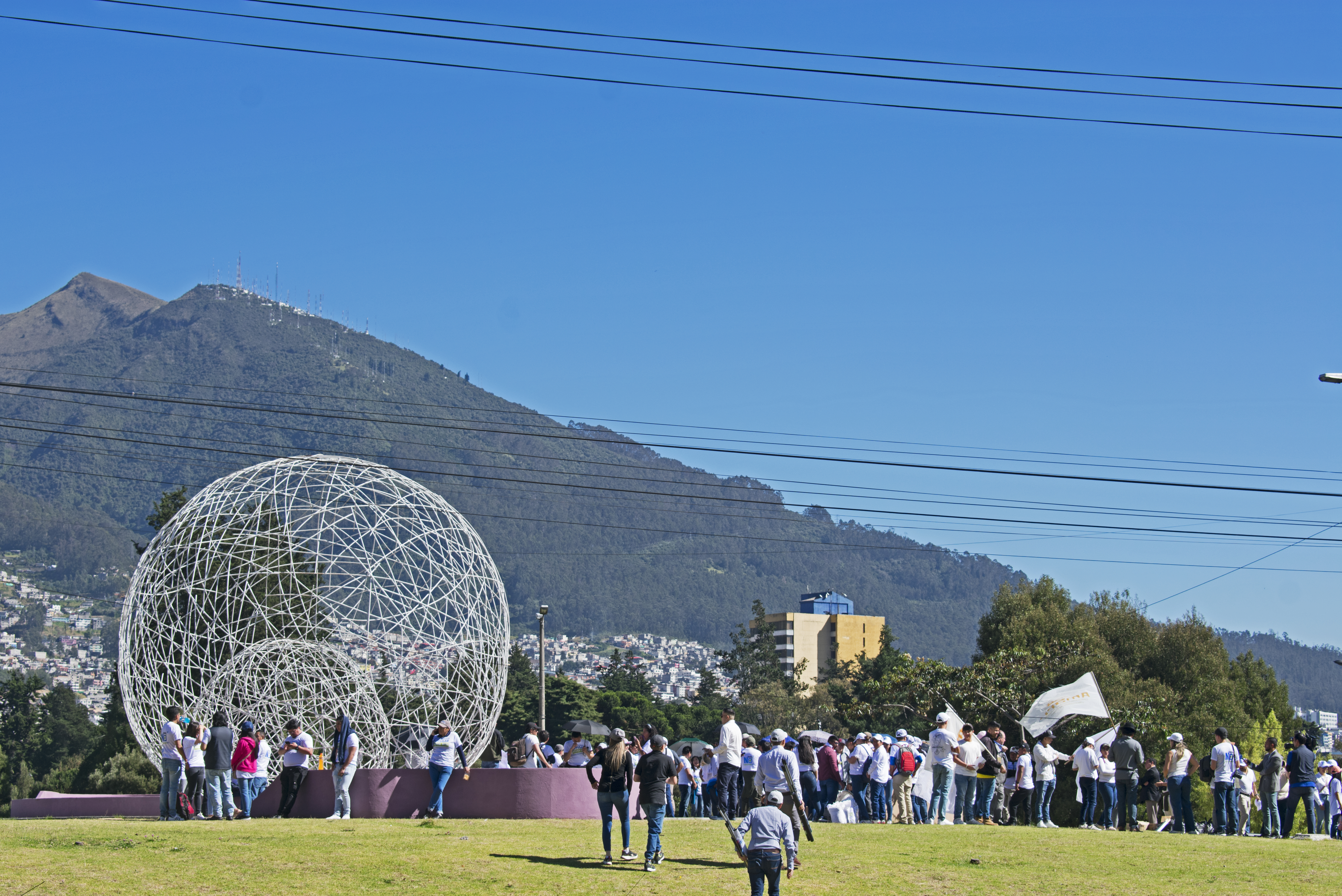
Demonstration in Quito supporting blank voting ("Vota no")

The president is elected using a modified two-round system, with a candidate required to get over 50% of the vote, or get over 40% of the vote and be 10 points ahead of their nearest rival, to be elected in the first round. The president is limited to two consecutive four-year terms.

Members of the National Assembly are elected by three methods. Fifteen are elected by closed list proportional representation in a nationwide constituency. Six are elected by overseas voters (two each from Canada/United States, Latin America/Caribbean/Africa and Asia/Europe/Oceania). The remaining 116 members are elected from multi-member constituencies by closed list proportional representation, with all seats allocated using the Webster method. Members of the National Assembly are limited to two four-year terms, regardless if they are consecutive or not. There are gender quotas for the party lists, meaning there is alternation between men and women. There are no quotas for minority representation.

== Presidential candidates ==
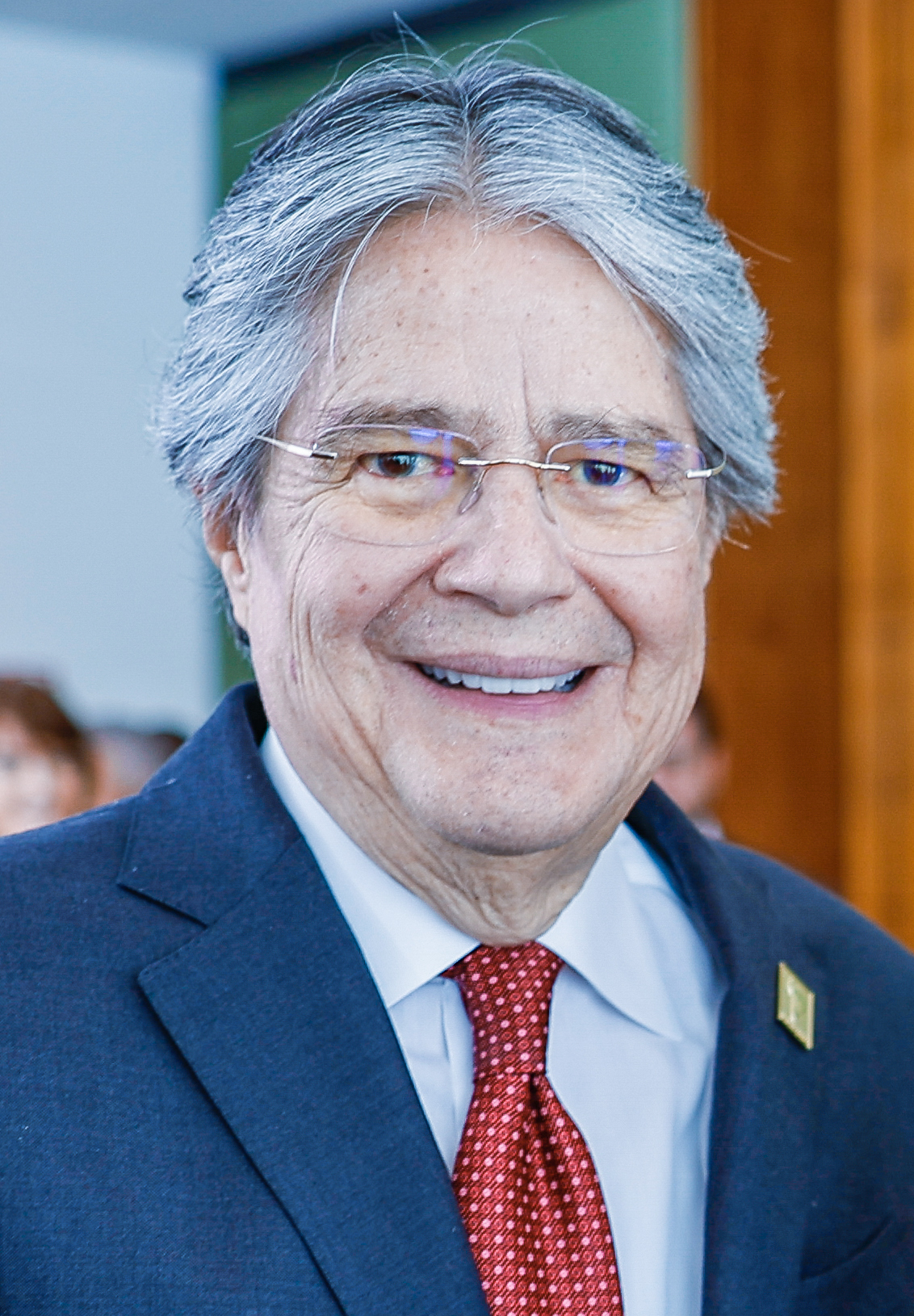
President Guillermo Lasso declined to run on 19 May 2023

A day after the dissolution of the National Assembly on 17 May 2023, former Vice President Otto Sonnenholzner announced his candidacy for the presidency, with his campaign being endorsed by Actuemos Alliance and the Democratic Left Party. That same day, former National Assembly member and journalist Fernando Villavicencio announced his campaign with the support of the Movimiento Construye Party. On 19 May, President Lasso announced in an interview with The Washington Post that he would not run in the 2023 election. Former Mayor of Guayaquil and 1992 and 1996 presidential candidate Jaime Nebot expressed interest in running under the Social Christian Party; however, the party declined to nominate a candidate and instead endorsed businessman Jan Topić's candidacy on 21 May.

On 24 May, former National Assembly member Daniel Noboa, son of businessman and former presidential candidate Álvaro Noboa, announced his candidacy and was endorsed by the Democrática Nacional Alliance. The next day, former Azuay Provincial Prefect and 2021 presidential candidate Yaku Pérez Guartambel announced his candidacy and was endorsed by the Claro Que Se Puede Alliance and Pachakutik. On 29 May, activist Bolívar Armijos Velasco announced his campaign along with the endorsement of the AMIGO Movement.

On 6 June, President Lasso's party Creating Opportunities announced that they would not endorse a presidential candidate. On 8 June, Quito-based businessman and 2021 presidential candidate Xavier Hervas announced his candidacy and was endorsed by the RETO Movement. On 10 June, the Rafael Correa-funded Citizen Revolution Movement party sought to nominate former Vice President Jorge Glas as their nominee; Glas declined the nomination, however. 2021 presidential runner-up Andrés Arauz also declined to run and instead sought the vice presidential candidacy. The party instead nominated former Assemblywoman Luisa González as its presidential nominee and Arauz as her running mate.

On 13 July 2023, the National Electoral Council (CNE) officially confirmed the eight candidacies of Armijos, González, Hervas, Noboa Azín, Pérez Guartambel, Sonnenholzner, Topić and Villavicencio. The CNE also said that the official campaign period would run from 13 July until 20 August.

On 13 August, journalist Christian Zurita was named as Villavicencio's replacement following his assassination.

=== Advanced to runoff ===
Name	Born	Experience	Home province	Running mate	Campaign	Ref
Luisa González	22 November 1977 (age 45); Quito, Pichincha	Member of the National Assembly (2021–2023); Secretary of Public Administration (2017)	Manabí	Andrés Arauz Galarza	Endorsed by: RC Announced: 10 June 2023	
Daniel Noboa	30 November 1987 (age 35); Miami, Florida, U.S.	Member of the National Assembly (2021–2023); Founder of DNA Entertainment Group	Santa Elena	Verónica Abad Rojas	Endorsed by: ADN (Note: Alliance is composed of People, Equality and Democracy and Mover) Announced: 24 May 2023	

=== Eliminated in first round ===
Name	Born	Experience	Home province	Running mate	Campaign	Ref
Bolívar Armijos	9 January 1976 (age 47); San Lorenzo, Esmeraldas	President of CONAGOPARE (2014–2019)	Esmeraldas	Linda Romero Espinoza	Endorsed by: AMIGO Announced: 29 May 2023	
Xavier Hervas	7 October 1972 (age 50); Guayaquil, Guayas	President of NovaAlimentos S.A. Candidate for president (2021)	Pichincha	Luz Marina Vega Conejo	Endorsed by: RETO Announced: 8 June 2023	
Yaku Pérez Guartambel	26 February 1969 (age 54); Cuenca, Azuay	Provincial Prefect of Azuay Province (2019–2020); President of ECUARUNARI (2013–2019); Candidate for president (2021)	Azuay	Nory Pinela Morán	Endorsed by: Claro Que Se; Puede (Note: Alliance is composed of Popular Unity, Socialist Party – Broad Front of Ecuador and Democracia Sí); Pachakutik Announced: 25 May 2023	
Otto Sonnenholzner	19 March 1983 (age 40); Guayaquil, Guayas	Vice President of Ecuador (2018–2020)	Guayas	Erika Paredes Sánchez	Endorsed by: Actuemos (Note: Alliance is composed of Avanza and SUMA); Democratic Left Announced: 18 May 2023	
Jan Topić	23 April 1983 (age 40); Guayaquil, Guayas	President of Telconet (2010–present)	Guayas	Diana Jácome Silva	Endorsed by: Por Un País; Sin Miedo (Note: Alliance is composed of Christian Social Party (logo pictured), Patriotic Society Party and Democratic Center) Announced: 21 May 2023	
Christian Zurita	4 April 1970 (age 53); Quito, Pichincha	Investigative journalist	Pichincha	Andrea González Náder	Endorsed by: MC25 (Note: Replacement candidate following assassination of Fernando Villavicencio) Announced: 13 August 2023	

==== Assassinated prior to election ====
Name	Personal	Experience	Home province	Running mate	Campaign	Ref
Fernando Villavicencio	11 October 1963 – 9 August 2023 (aged 59)	Member of the National Assembly (2021–2023)	Pichincha	Andrea González Náder	Endorsed by: MC25 Announced: 17 May 2023 Assassinated: 9 August 2023	

=== Declined ===
- Andrés Arauz, President of the Citizen Revolution Movement (2020–2021) and 2021 presidential candidate (running for vice president).
- Dalton Bacigalupo Buenaventura, member of the National Assembly (2021–2023).
- Jorge Glas, Vice President of Ecuador (2013–2018) (endorsed González).
- Leonidas Iza, President of the Confederation of Indigenous Nationalities of Ecuador (since 2021).
- Pedro José Freile, Director of the Inter-American Development Bank Ecuador Division (2004–2005), leader of the AMIGO Movement (2020–2022) and 2021 presidential candidate (endorsed Topić).
- Guillermo Lasso, Incumbent president of Ecuador (since 2021) and founder of CREO.
- Eduardo Maruri, businessman, member of the Ecuadorian Constituent Assembly (2007) and president of Barcelona S.C. (2007–2010) (endorsed Sonnenholzner).
- Jaime Nebot, Mayor of Guayaquil (2000–2019), member of the National Congress (1990–1992, 1998–2000), Governor of Guayas Province (1984–1988) and 1992 and 1996 presidential candidate (party endorsed Topić).
- Salvador Quishpe, member of the National Assembly (2021–2023), Provincial Prefect of Zamora-Chinchipe Province (2009–2019), member of the National Congress (2003–2008).
- Carlos Rabascall, journalist and 2021 vice presidential candidate.

== Opinion polls ==
=== Run-off ===
Date	Participants	Pollster	Margin of error	Daniel Noboa	Luisa González	Blank	Null	Undecided
14 October	16,486	Omar Maluk	3%	50.9%	49.1%	---		
14 October	16,486	Omar Maluk	3%	47.8%	46.1%	6.1%		--
15 October [projection]	1,200	CIT Peru	2.8%	49.14%	50.86%	---		
12 October	1,200	CIT Peru	2.8%	50.42%	49.52%	---		
12 October	1,200	CIT Peru	2.8%	45.00%	44.02%	10.8%		--
10 October	1,485	Dado Duro EC	2.8%	38.6%	39.6%	12.4%		9.3%
9 October	1,000	Negocios & Estratégias	3.1%	49.94%	50.06%	---		
9 October	1,000	Negocios & Estratégias	3.1%	43.9%	44%	12.1%		
8 October	5,420	Comunicaliza	1.33%	41.4%	36.2%	9.2%		13.2%
6 October	Six suspects in the assassination of Fernando Villavicencio are killed in Guayaquil Penitentiary							
5 October	11,235	Omar Maluk	3%	48.9%	51.1%	---		
4 October	3,750	NEO Consulta	1.6%	48.9%	51.1%	---		
4 October	3,000	Negocios & Estratégias	1.8%	44%	42.8%	5.3%		7.8%
1 October		Official second round presidential debate is held in Quito						
15 September	5,032	Comunicaliza	1.38%	43.1%	35.1%	9.5%		12.3%
15 September	8,000	Omar Maluk	2%	52.3%	47.7%	---		
10 September	5,381	Comunicaliza	1.3%	39.7%	34.0%	11.8%		14.4%
6 September	3,040	Click Report	3%	55.2%	44.8%	–-		
6 September	3,040	Click Report	3%	45.8%	37.2%	12.5%	4.5%	–
5 September	2,100	NEO Consulta	2.1%	49.6%	50.4%	–-		
5 September	2,100	NEO Consulta	2.1%	42.0%	42.7%	8.6%	6.7%	–
2 September	6,002	Comunicaliza	1.3%	43.1%	35.4%	8.6%		12.9%

=== First round ===
Date	Pollster	Participants	Margin of error	Noboa	González	Sonnenholzner	Pérez	Villavicencio	Zurita	Hervas	Topić	Armijos	Blank	Null	Undecided
20 August	Election	—N/a	—N/a	23.47%	33.61%	7.06%	3.97%	—N/a	16.37%	0.49%	14.67%	0.36%	2.04	6.77	—N/a
11–12 August	Comunicaliza	3,641	1.62%	3.3%	24.9%	8.2%	5.8%	—N/a	14.5%	1.6%	21.7%	0.3%	9.5%		10.2%
9 August	Fernando Villavicencio is assassinated at a campaign rally in Quito and replaced by Zurita														
9 August	Cedatos	1,803	3.1%	3.7%	35.4%	7.5%	11.9%	18.4%	–	4.1%	18%	0.9%	–	–	–
9 August	Cedatos	1,803	3.1%	2.5%	24%	5.1%	8.1%	12.5%	–	2.8%	12.2%	0.6%	11.9%	2.8%	17.5%
6 August	Click Report	3,040	3%	6.8%	29.3%	9.2%	14.4%	7.5%	–	6.8%	9.6%	6.8%	16.9%	3.2%	–
5 August	Telcodata	6,600	1.2%	2.0%	30.5%	6.5%	7.7%	6.8%	–	1.6%	13.1%	0.2%	7.6%		23.8%
2 August	IPSOS	2,490	1.96%	4%	29%	16%	10%	12%	–	5%	9%	1%	11%		5%
2 August	Telcodata	6,631	1.2%	2.1%	29.8%	7.7%	8.8%	7.4%	–	2.2%	10.1%	0.3%	7.5%		23.9%
27 July	Tracking	1,250	5%	3.2%	23.2%	19.4%	10.1%	9.2%	–	4.5%	3.8%	0.7%	14.1%	2.6%	9.2%
26 July	Comunicaliza	3,539	1.7%	4.2%	28.6%	12.6%	8.1%	9.2%	–	4.4%	4.4%	0.5%	13.6%		14.5%
23 July	Agustín Intriago, Mayor of Manta, is assassinated.														
20 July	Estrategas Infinity	1,549	2.5%	3.1%	30.9%	11.9%	10.0%	7.8%	–	5.0%	5.2%	0.3%	11.9%	3.0%	11.0%
18 July	Cedatos	1,300	3.1%	4.4%	26.6%	7.5%	12.5%	13.2%	–	6.0%	3.2%	0.5%	2.6%	16.1%	7.6%
9 July	Numma	1,604	2.7%	6.4%	33.8%	17.5%	15.1%	10.2%	–	6.9%	8.5%	1.6%	–	–	–
3–9 July	Tracking	1,250	5%	4.6%	24.2%	15.2%	11.5%	8.0%	–	5.4%	4.5%	0.6%	10.3%		15.3%
20 June–8 July	Omar Maluk	7,106	3%	4.4%	40.1%	14.7%	13.6%	9.1%	–	10.3%	7.1%	0.6%	–	–	–
20 June–8 July	Omar Maluk	7,106	3%	3.7%	33.8%	12.4%	11.5%	7.7%	–	8.7%	6.0%	0.5%	5.9%	9.8%	
5–6 July	Comunicaliza	3,314	1.7%	4.5%	26.8%	12.8%	10.3%	9.3%	–	6.5%	3.0%	0.1%	12.1%		14.1%
26 June–3 July	Metria	1,200	2.8%	3.1%	37.8%	18.2%	11.0%	7.5%	–	1.7%	6.5%	›1%	10.1%	–	4.0%
22–26 June	Negocios & Estrategias	3,524	1.7%	4%	52%	14%	13%	4%	–	9%	5%	0%	–	–	–
22–26 June	Negocios & Estrategias	3,524	1.7%	3%	41%	11%	10%	7%	–	3%	4%	0%	21%		–
22–26 June	Negocios & Estrategias	3,524	1.7%	1%	30%	8%	8%	5%	–	2%	2%	0%	6%		38%
23–26 June	Mercanalis	4,000	3%	7%	38%	9%	12%	10%	–	8%	14%	2%	–	–	–
23–26 June	Mercanalis	4,000	3%	5%	27%	6%	9%	7%	–	5%	10%	1%	12%	18%	–
20–24 June	Data Encuesta	4,200	3.4%	5.2%	28.1%	9.6%	16.6%	9.3%	–	7.3%	14.8%	–	–	–	9.1%
19–20 June	Estrategas Infinity	3,645	1.62%	4.3%	28.0%	9.9%	8.8%	8.3%	–	6.1%	2.5%	0.5%	3.9%	15.9%	11.8%
16–18 June	Comunicaliza	3,656	1.62%	3.8%	25.9%	11.2%	10.3%	8.0%	–	6.2%	2.6%	0.4%	13.2%		18.4%
5–9 June	Data Encuesta	4,800	3.4%	4.2%	27.8%	7.6%	14.8%	7.1%	–	6.2%	14.2%	–	–	–	17.9%

Precandidates polling

Date	Pollster	Participants	Margin of error	Guillermo Lasso (CREO)	Andrés Arauz (RC)	Rafael Correa (RC)	Luisa González (RC)	Carlos Rabascall (RC)	Leonidas Iza (MUPP)	Jaime Nebot (PSC)	Jan Topić (PSC–PSP–CD)	Yaku Pérez (UP–PSE–DSÍ)	Fernando Villavicencio (MC25)	Otto Sonnenholzner (Avanza–SUMA)	Xavier Hervas (RETO)	Daniel Noboa (PID–MOVER)	Others	Null	Blank	Undecided
6/2	Estrategas Infinity	1,518	3.4%	5.8%	27.2%	–	–	–	9.2%	–	3.2%	14.1%	9.3%	9.9%	–	5.3%	4.6%	11.4%		–
5/29	Cedatos	2.400	1.3%	–	–	–	2.6%	–	9.1%	–	4.0%	13.2%	6.5%	7.2%	–	4.9%	1.1%	34.2%	4.7%	12.5%
5/29	Cedatos	2.400	1.3%	–	–	–	–	2.7%	6.3%	–	4.5%	12.6%	6.8%	7.2%	–	5.2%	1.2%	34.2%	4.6%	14.8%
5/29	Cedatos	2.400	1.3%	4.3%	18.6%	–	–	–	6.7%	–	3.8%	11.4%	5.9%	5.7%	–	4.8%	–	23.7%	4.4%	10.9%
5/17	President Guillermo Lasso decrees "muerte cruzada", dissolving the National Assembly and calling snap elections.																			
4/21	IMASEN	1,500	2.5%	2.0%	–	32.3%	–	–	–	–	–	–	–	–	2.0%	–	8.1%	19.3%	–	36.3%
3/19	Clima Social	5.600	1.3%	1.8%	16.5%	–	–	–	8.4%	1.7%	–	7.4%	2.5%	2.0%	6.0%	–	18.1%	25.6%	–	10.1%
3/19	Clima Social	5.600	1.3%	2.3%	–	40.4%	–	–	4.4%	0.62%	–	4.0%	2.2%	1.4%	5.0%	–	13.1%	19.7%	–	6.9%

== Results ==
=== President ===
Candidate	Running mate	Party	First round		Second round	
Candidate	Running mate	Party	Votes	%	Votes	%
Luisa González	Andrés Arauz	Citizen Revolution Movement	3,315,663	33.61	4,880,525	48.17
Daniel Noboa	Verónica Abad Rojas	National Democratic Action	2,315,296	23.47	5,251,695	51.83
Christian Zurita	Andrea González Náder	Movimiento Construye	1,614,434	16.37		
Jan Topić	Diana Jácome Silva	Por Un País Sin Miedo	1,446,812	14.67		
Otto Sonnenholzner	Erika Paredes Sánchez	Actuemos	696,548	7.06		
Yaku Pérez	Nory Pinela Morán	Claro Que Se Puede	391,674	3.97		
Xavier Hervas	Luz Marina Vega Conejo	RETO Movement	48,428	0.49		
Bolívar Armijos	Linda Romero Espinoza	AMIGO Movement	35,785	0.36		
Total			9,864,640	100.00	10,132,220	100.00
Valid votes			9,864,640	91.19	10,132,220	91.49
Invalid votes			732,478	6.77	858,394	7.75
Blank votes			220,717	2.04	84,178	0.76
Total votes			10,817,835	100.00	11,074,792	100.00
Registered voters/turnout			13,045,553	82.92	13,446,682	82.36
Source: CNE, CNE

González

Noboa

Zurita

Topić

=== National Assembly ===
Party	National			Provincial			Overseas			Total seats	+/–
Party	Votes	%	Seats	Votes	%	Seats	Votes	%	Seats	Total seats	+/–
Citizen Revolution Movement (Note: Supported by MAR70 and PLAN77 in El Oro and by Sumak Yuyay in Napo. 41 provincial seats won by RC, one won by PLAN77.)	3,326,110	39.72	6	3,059,898	35.65	42	59,615	56.17	4	52	+3
Movimiento Construye	1,707,682	20.39	3	1,428,869	16.65	24	13,934	13.13	1	28	+16
National Democratic Action	1,219,254	14.56	2	884,747	10.31	11	9,597	9.04	1	14	New
Social Christian Party (Note: Supported by MDG in Guayas and by Caminantes in Manabi.)	996,206	11.90	2	948,333	11.05	12	2,252	2.12	0	14	–4
Actuemos (Avanza–SUMA)	377,953	4.51	1	577,384	6.73	7	3,488	3.29	0	8	+8
Patriotic Society Party	264,701	3.16	1	118,972	1.39	0				1	0
Claro Que Se Puede (UP–PSE–DSì) (Note: Supported by AFE in El Oro. One provincial seat won by UP, one by PSE, one by AFE.)	240,015	2.87	0	360,066	4.20	3	5,209	4.91	0	3	+3
RETO Movement	141,577	1.69	0	128,174	1.49	0				0	0
AMIGO Movement	100,995	1.21	0	69,265	0.81	1	288	0.27	0	1	+1
Pachakutik				349,450	4.07	4	4,302	4.05	0	4	–23
Democratic Center				137,747	1.60	1				1	+1
PSP–PSC (Note: Alliance running only in Chimborazo, Napo and Sucumbíos. Two provincial seats won by PSP.)				52,119	0.61	2				2	+2
RETO–MUPP (Note: Alliance running only in Chimborazo. One provincial seat won by RETO.)				47,017	0.55	1				1	+1
MC–AMIGO (Note: Alliance running only in Cotopaxi. One provincial seat won by MC.)				43,935	0.51	1				1	+1
Democratic Left (Note: Supported by MINGA in Bolivar.)				40,743	0.47	0				0	–18
RETO–CD–MP (Note: Alliance running only in Orellana. One provincial seat won by RETO.)				29,771	0.35	1				1	+1
Ecuadorian Socialist Party (Note: Run disjointly from the Claro Que Se Puede alliance only in Cañar)				14,100	0.16	0				0	0
PSP–PSC–CD (Note: Alliance running only in Bolivar.)				10,860	0.13	0				0	0
CD–AMIGO (Note: Alliance running only in Azuay.)				5,009	0.06	0				0	0
Provincial movements (Note: MSC/MPUP/Semilla/MPCG/Unete/MAS)				276,398	3.22	6				6	+3
PSC–CD							7,455	7.02	0	0	–3
Total	8,374,493	100.00	15	8,582,857	100.00	116	106,140	100.00	6	137	–
Valid votes	8,374,493	77.41		8,582,857	79.41		106,140	81.35			
Invalid/blank votes	2,443,773	22.59		2,225,585	20.59		24,333	18.65			
Total votes	10,818,266	100.00		10,808,442	100.00		130,473	100.00			
Registered voters/turnout	13,045,553	82.93		12,419,632	87.03		409,250	31.88			
Source: CNE, CNE

==== Parliamentary results by province ====
	MRC	MC25	ADN	PSC	Actuemos	PSP	CQSP	RETO	AMIGO
Azuay Province	32.82%	24.09%	16.28%	8.43%	5.1%	2.15%	8.08%	1.83%	1.22%
Bolivar Province	28.98%	24.12%	8.25%	12.33%	4.21%	11.82%	4.95%	3.58%	1.76%
Cañar Province	36.49%	24.32%	11.59%	8.78%	4.47%	4.43%	6.63%	1.39%	1.91%
Carchi Province	31.99%	18.56%	17.26%	7.55%	5.56%	3.81%	4%	9.9%	1.37%
Cotopaxi Province	32.16%	23.31%	14.14%	9.72%	3.84%	6.02%	5.16%	2.76%	2.88%
Chimborazo Province	28.78%	29.03%	15.6%	8.63%	3.09%	6.11%	4.31%	2.61%	1.84%
El Oro Province	40.95%	19.65%	14.26%	13.42%	2.97%	2.01%	2.99%	2.16%	1.59%
Esmeraldas Province	51.16%	15.64%	6.8%	17.29%	3.4%	1.49%	2.14%	0.87%	1.21%
Guayas Province	42.59%	16.97%	16.06%	15.03%	5.38%	1.16%	1.3%	0.93%	0.58%
Imbabura Province	42.4%	20.69%	13.94%	8.81%	5.48%	2.44%	3.4%	1.48%	1.36%
Loja Province	27.11%	27.14%	20.49%	9.55%	4.49%	3.27%	3.65%	2.32%	1.98%
Los Rios Province	51.04%	11.74%	9.45%	17.64%	2.59%	2.68%	2.97%	1.12%	0.77%
Manabi Province	56.47%	12.48%	11.89%	10.99%	3.12%	1.68%	1.7%	0.86%	0.83%
Morona Santiago Province	29.4%	23.23%	10.28%	8.4%	6.16%	11.15%	7.43%	1.93%	2.01%
Napo Province	20.76%	22.9%	8.33%	7.12%	2.17%	27.78%	3.16%	6.63%	1.14%
Pastaza Province	21.35%	31.56%	13.33%	9.88%	3.8%	10.97%	4%	2.81%	2.3%
Pichincha Province	33.24%	28.33%	15%	9.53%	5.82%	2.84%	2.76%	1.32%	1.16%
Tungurahua Province	20.75%	26.88%	18.92%	11.13%	4.39%	6.66%	3.79%	5.91%	1.58%
Zamora Chinchipe Province	25.25%	24.38%	17.8%	7.57%	4.07%	8.59%	5.92%	4.45%	1.97%
Galápagos Province	30.19%	25.73%	9.6%	20.57%	6.46%	3.18%	2.07%	1.47%	0.73%
Sucumbíos Province	50.58%	12.94%	8.48%	5.76%	2.31%	14.41%	2.35%	1.88%	1.28%
Orellana Province	40.93%	15.84%	11.08%	7.37%	3.41%	9.85%	7.81%	1.97%	1.73%
Santo Domingo de los Tsáchilas Province	41.9%	19.54%	14.58%	12.59%	2.83%	2.36%	1.99%	1.15%	3.08%
Santa Elena Province	45.3%	12.78%	22.08%	9.8%	3.11%	1.58%	1.92%	1.73%	1.69%
Europe, Oceania and Asia	-	-	-	-	-	-	-	-	-
Canada and the United States	-	-	-	-	-	-	-	-	-
Latin America, The Caribbean and Africa	-	-	-	-	-	-	-	-	-
Source: CNE

== Aftermath ==
=== First round ===
On 20 August, Luisa González advanced to the run-off election after finishing in first place, winning 33% of the vote. Her first-place finish was predicted. She was noted by commentators as a protege to former President Rafael Correa. Also advancing to the run-off was businessman Daniel Noboa, whose second-place finish was seen as a surprise as his polling numbers were low in the days before the election. His debate performance days before the election was seen as a key factor in his second-place finish. Violence, political stability and the assassination of Fernando Villavicencio were heavily noted a key factors for voters. If González would have been elected, she would have been the first woman to be elected president. In contrast, if Noboa was elected, he would be the youngest president in Ecuador's history, at 35 years old when he took office.

In the National Assembly, the Citizen Revolution Movement won the most votes, coming in the first place at nearly 40% of the popular vote. In second place, Villavicencio's Movimiento Construye won 20% of the popular vote. Also on the ballot were votes on a referendum on oil exploitation in the Yasuní National Park and a local one on metallic mining in the Chocó Andino. Voters voted to approve both measures, banning both oil exploitation in the Yasuní National Park, and metallic mining in the Chocó Andino.

During the first round of the election, the overseas votes had several complications and a final count could not be established. Several citizens criticized the delay in counting overseas ballots with the Organization of American States vowing to assist in addressing the problem. CNE President Diana Atamaint said that the delay in counting the oversea ballots were attributed to "cyber attacks" and that new security measures were being implemented to deter further attacks. Demonstrations were held both outside the CNE headquarters in Quito and in several cities abroad, demanding a repeat vote. As a result, on 25 August, the CNE decided to annul the results of the oversea ballots, ordering a repeat of the legislative votes on the day of the runoff.

=== Second round ===
González, the runner-up in the second round of the presidential election, conceded to Noboa, saying "the candidate they [Noboa's voters] chose has won and as Ecuadoreans we also embrace them". At age 35, Noboa became the youngest person elected to the presidency. Following his victory, Noboa thanked voters for believing in "a new political project, a young political project, an improbable political project". He vowed "to return peace to the country, to give education to the youth again, to be able to provide employment to the many people who are looking for it".
