= Salvador Quishpe =

Ecuadorian politician (born 1971)

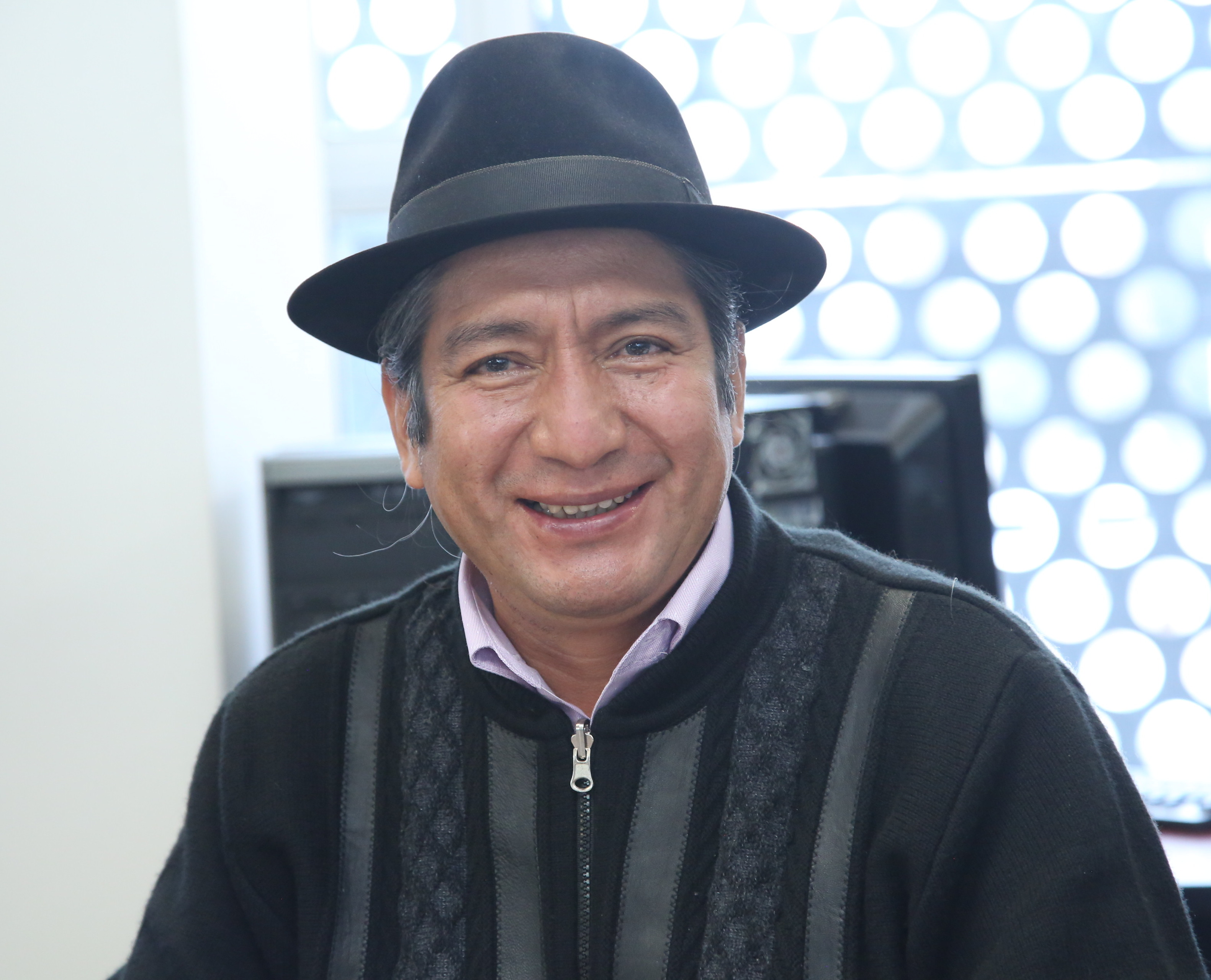
Quishpe in 2022

Salvador Quishpe Lozano (born 15 March 1971) is an Ecuadorian politician who was a member of the Pachakutik Party. Quishpe was born in Zamora, Ecuador.

Quishpe served as a member of the National Assembly from 2021 until the dissolution of the assembly in 2023. Prior, he served as Prefect of the Zamora-Chinchipe Province from 2009 to 2019. He was succeeded by Cléver Jiménez.

Quishpe was seen as a potential presidential candidate in the 2023 election, however he declined to run.
