= Danilo Carrera Drouet =

Ecuadorian businessman

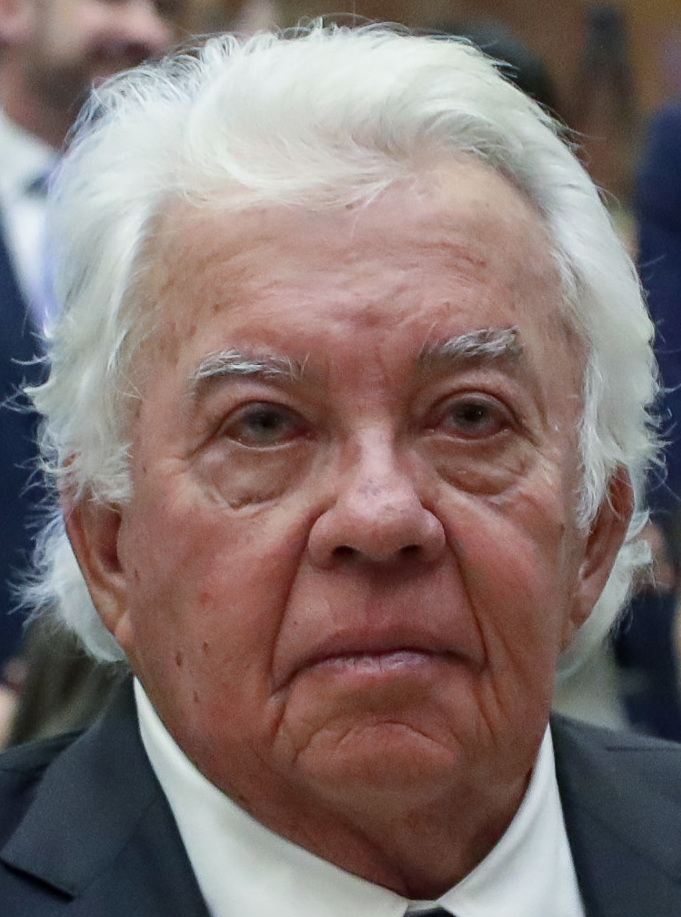
Carrera Drouet in 2022

Danilo Carrera Drouet (born 13 October 1938) is an Ecuadorian businessman and banker who served as the President of Banco Guayaquil from 1983 to 1984. He is the brother-in-law of President Guillermo Lasso, who also served as president of Banco Guayaquil. He was general manager of Central Bank of Ecuador from January 1976 to November 1976. Carrera Drouet was born in Guayaquil, Ecuador.

Carrera Drouet was listed on the Paradise Papers for serving as vice president of an investment firm in the Cayman Islands.

On 9 January 2023, La Posta published a report titled El Gran Padrino ("The Great Godfather"), in which it detailed an alleged corruption plot within public companies centered around Carrera Drouet. The report eventually led to an impeachment inquiry against Lasso and his invocation muerte cruzada which led to the dissolution of the National Assembly.
