= German Ecuadorians =

Total population
- 45,000

Regions with significant populations
- Manabí, Guayas, Pichincha, El Oro.

Languages
- Spanish, German

Religion
- Roman Catholicism, Lutheranism, Eastern Orthodoxy

Related ethnic groups
- German people, German Americans, German Argentines, German Brazilians, German Canadians, German Chileans, German Mexicans, German Paraguayans, German Peruvians, German Puerto Ricans, German Uruguayans, German Venezuelans

German immigration to Ecuador developed massively, especially in the mid-19th century, when hundreds or thousands of Germans, from different cultural, political, and social levels, migrated to Ecuador.

== History ==
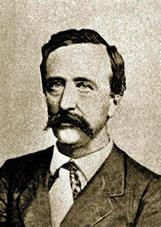
Antonio Neumane, creator of the music of the National Anthem of Ecuador.

German visits to Ecuador included botanists, Petrographers, geologists, mountaineers (who came to climb the summits of the volcanoes Chimborazo, Cotopaxi and Tungurahua), orchidologists, chemists, geographers and cartographers such as the German Carl Troll. The traveler Friedrich Gerstäcker wrote the first novel about the Ecuadorian revolutions: General Franco: An Ecuadorian Life (1860).

German immigration to Ecuador was concentrated mainly in the provinces of Manabí and Guayas, settling in the cities of Manta, Chone, Santa Ana, Portoviejo, Bahía de Caráquez, Jama, Jipijapa, and Guayaquil. Also had German communities in the Ecuadorian highlands, in the cities of Quito, Loja, and Cuenca, Ecuador. A large number of Germans also settled in the towns of Zaruma, Piñas, Portovelo, and Arenillas in El Oro Province. Many of them arrived during the cacao boom at the beginning of the 19th century and in the mid-20th century. Most worked in the country's industrial and fishing sectors. The German architect and Catholic priest, Juan Bautista Stiehle, arrived in Ecuador to design numerous religious architectural works in Cuenca, among which the Cathedral of the Immaculate Conception (Cuenca) stands out.
