= Arenillas =

- Municipality
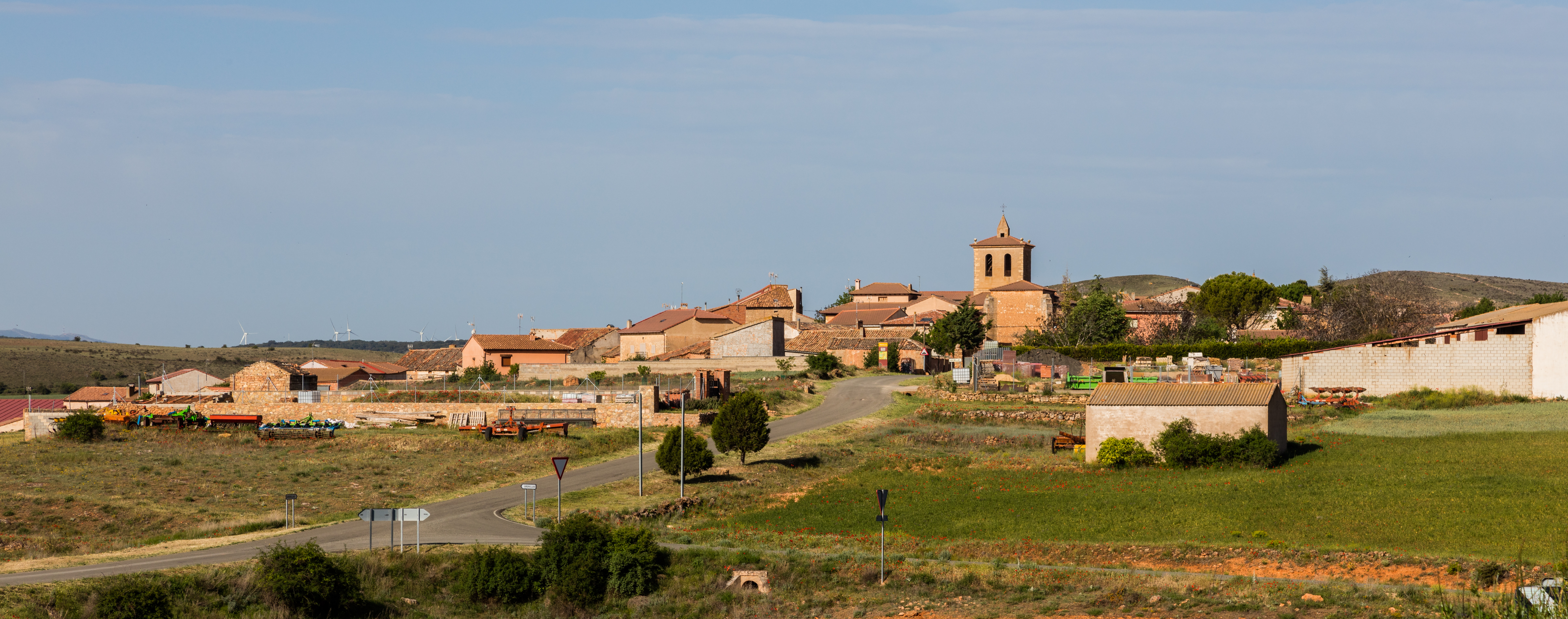

- Arenillas, on a map of the municipalities of the Soria province, on its southern border.

- Location in Spain. Arenillas (Spain)
- Country: Spain
- Autonomous community: Castile and León
- Province: Soria
- Comarca: Tierras de Berlanga

Area
  - Total: 30 km^{2} (12 sq mi)
- Elevation: 1,100 m (3,600 ft)

Population (2025-01-01)
  - Total: 29
  - Density: 0.97/km^{2} (2.5/sq mi)
- Time zone: UTC+1 (CET)
  - Summer (DST): UTC+2 (CEST)
- Website: Official website

Arenillas is a municipality in the province of Soria, in the autonomous community of Castile and León in north-central Spain, near the province's southern border with Guadalajara. It lies in the comarca (district) of Tierras de Berlanga, between the villages of Lumías and La Riba de Escalote, about 72 kilometres (45 mi) from the city of Soria. Like much of rural Soria, the village lost most of its population to migration to Spanish cities from the 1960s onward; a community association founded in the 1980s led local revitalisation efforts that won Arenillas a national community-development award in 1991, and in 2026 the municipality drew international press coverage for offering free housing and a job to attract a resident craftsperson and their family.

== Geography ==
Arenillas covers 30 square kilometres (12 mi^{2}) at an elevation of about 1,100 metres (3,600 ft), and the Escalote and Parado rivers run through its territory. The surrounding countryside is noted for extensive fields of lavender and other aromatic plants, which are harvested and distilled locally for use in perfumery, alongside honey produced from the same plants.

The village lies about 7 kilometres (4.3 mi) from the depopulated village of Cabreriza, near the centre of what has been described as the epicentre of rural depopulation in Spain, an area of roughly 2,025 square kilometres (782 mi^{2}) with a population density of about two people per square kilometre.

== History and depopulation response ==
Arenillas grew to a peak population in the early 20th century before a long decline, driven above all by migration to Spanish cities in the 1960s, that has continued with fluctuations ever since:

Population of Arenillas, 1900–2021
| 1900 | 1910 | 1920 | 1930 | 1940 | 1950 | 1960 | 1970 | 1981 | 1991 | 2001 | 2011 | 2021 |
|---|---|---|---|---|---|---|---|---|---|---|---|---|
| 431 | 441 | 426 | 420 | 394 | 326 | 303 | 110 | 59 | 51 | 42 | 34 | 47 |

In the 1980s, residents and summer visitors founded the Asociación Socio-Cultural de Arenillas, which organized volunteer labour to pave the village's streets; the group's efforts led Arenillas to receive Spain's Premio Nacional de Desarrollo Comunitario (National Community Development Award) in 1991. During the 1990s the village revived the traditional harvesting and distillation of lavender and other aromatic plants, and from 2000 it opened a tourist hostel, La Casa del Curato (a converted rectory house), and began hosting cultural events, including the music festival "Boina Fest" — held annually each August since 2015 with the explicit aim of combating rural depopulation — and "Violas y Luz de Luna", along with a mountain-biking route and a provincial small-game hunting championship.

According to Instituto Nacional de Estadística (INE) data, the municipality had 53 registered residents (29 men and 24 women) as of 1 January 2022. Spanish and international press coverage in April 2026 put the population at between 40 and 47, and reported that local authorities had launched a "Home & Job" programme offering rent-free municipal housing and a position at a local construction company, including management of the village's bar, to attract a resident craftsperson and their family. The initiative was part of a broader response to what has been termed España vaciada ("emptied Spain"), the sustained population decline affecting much of rural inland Spain.

== Landmarks ==
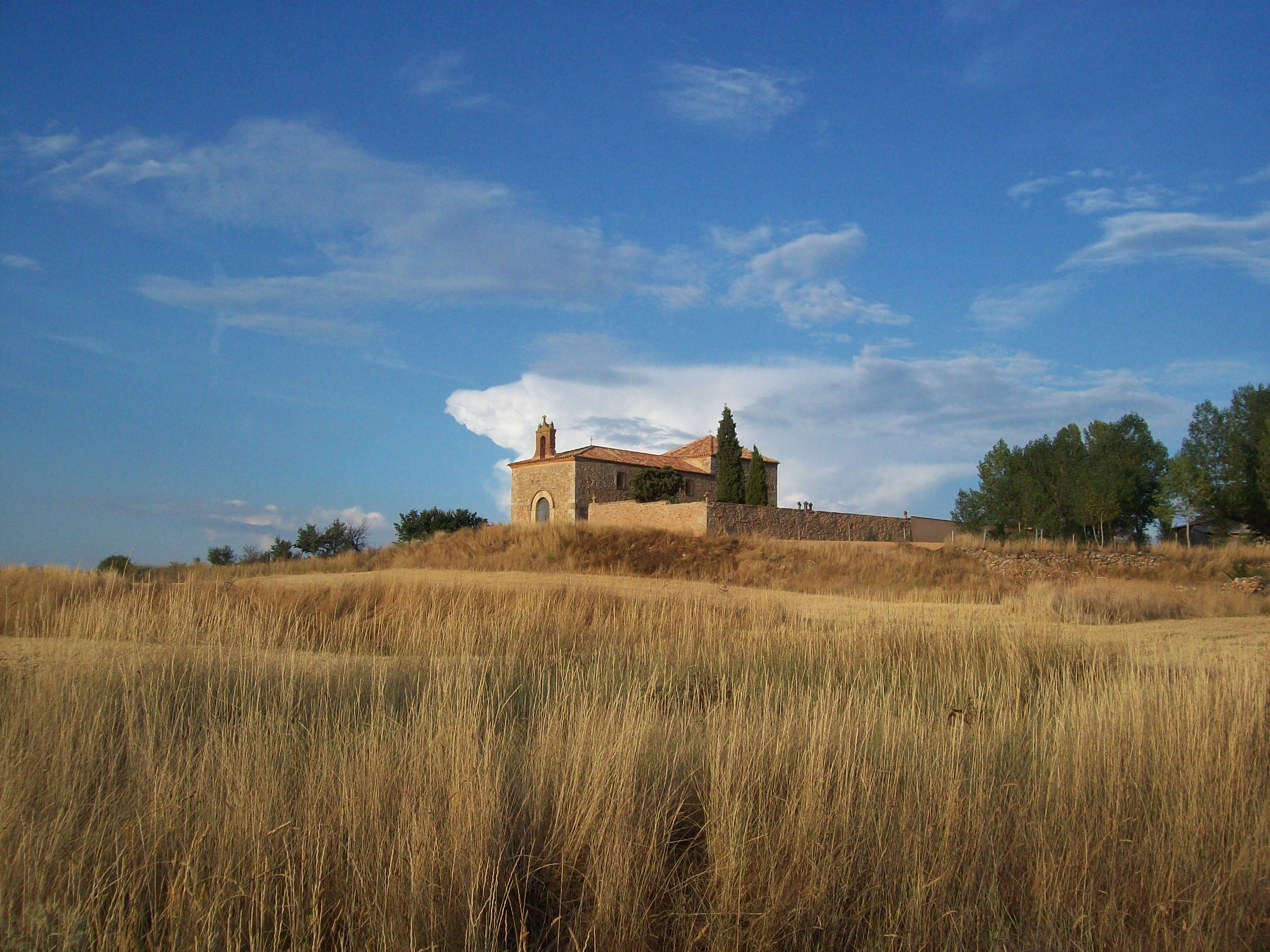
Hermitage of San Martín

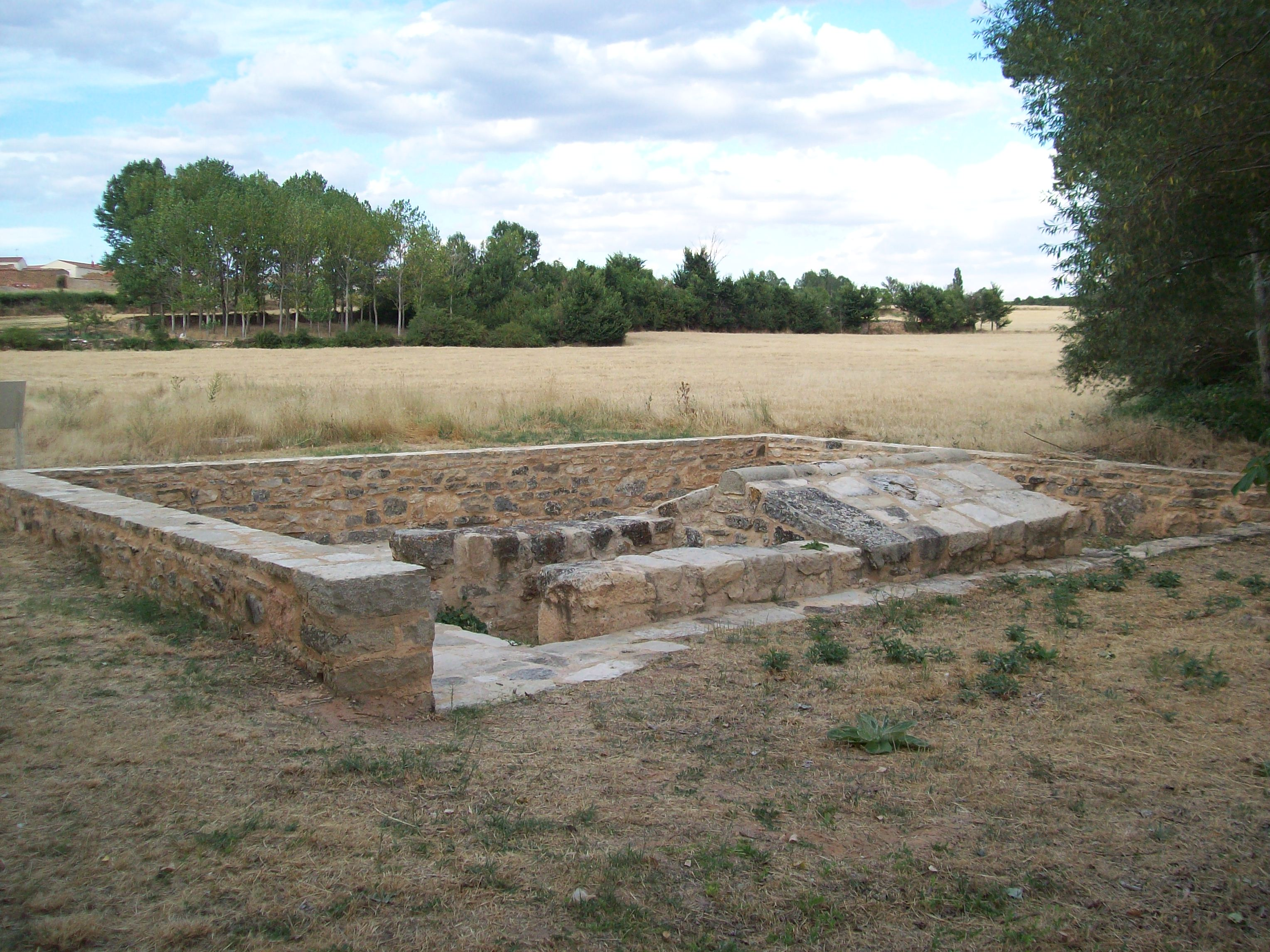
The Roman fountain

The parish church of San Cipriano y Santa Justina has a Gothic apse with star-ribbed vaulting, Baroque altarpieces and a Neoclassical organ; a carved figure of Christ known locally as Rompetejas is carried in Holy Week processions. Other landmarks include a Roman fountain, the hermitage of San Martín, a traditional still used for lavender distillation, and a small ethnographic museum.
