= Bolívar Armijos Velasco =

Ecuadorian politician (born 1976)

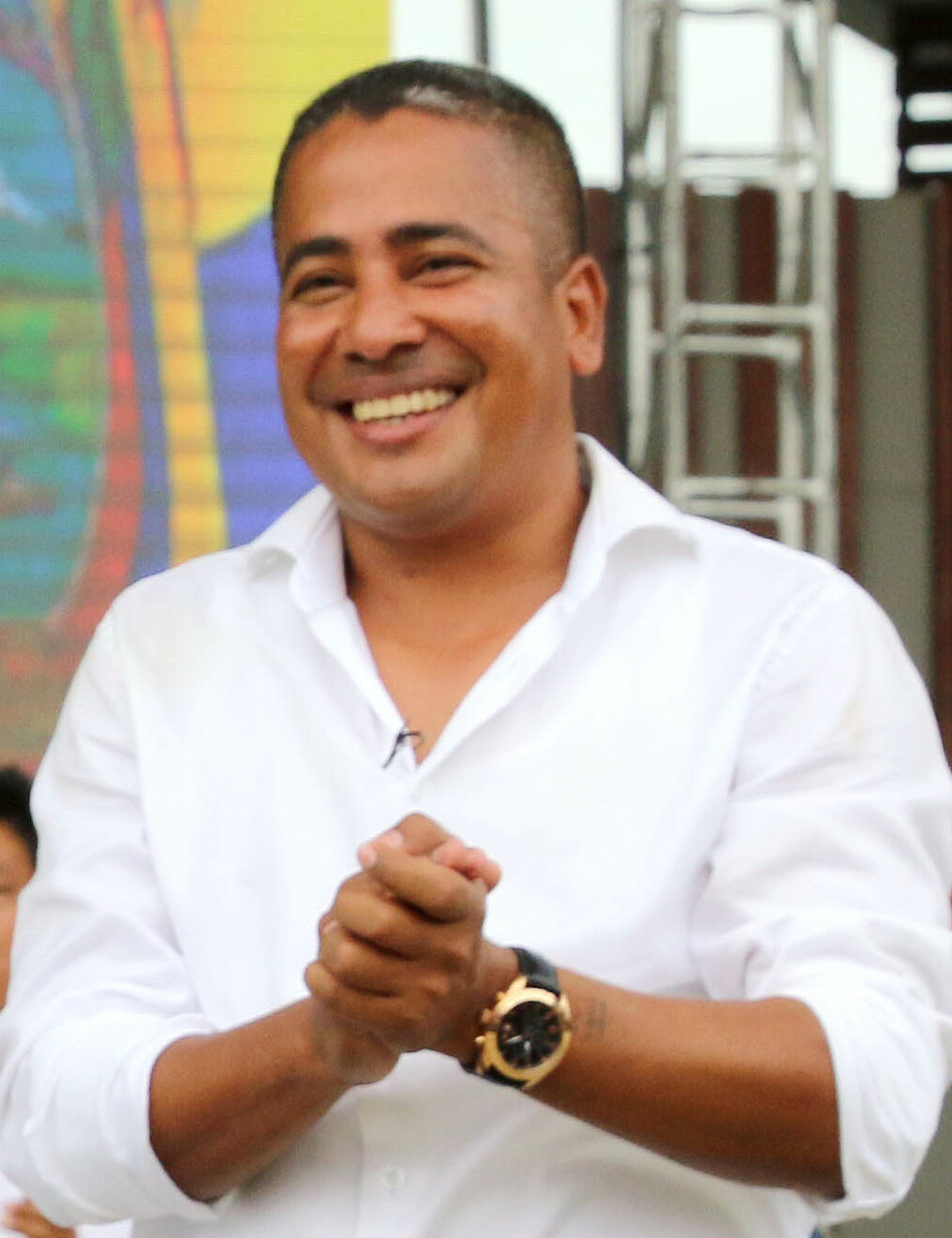
- Armijos Velasco in March 2017

President of the National Council of Rural Parochial Governments of Ecuador
- In office 2014–2019

Personal details
- Born: Bolívar Abdón Armijos Velasco; 9 January 1976 (age 50) San Lorenzo, Ecuador
- Other political affiliations: AMIGO Movement
- Education: Luis Vargas Torres Technical University
- Occupation: Lawyer and politician

Bolívar Abdón Armijos Velasco (born 9 January 1976) is an Ecuadorian lawyer and politician who served as president of the National Council of Rural Parochial Governments of Ecuador (CONAGOPARE). He was a candidate for the presidency of Ecuador for the AMIGO Movement in the Ecuador presidential elections of 2023.

== Early life ==
Bolívar Abdón Armijos Velasco was born in the Calderón parish of the San Lorenzo canton, in the province of Esmeraldas on 9 January 1976. After studying at the Luis Vargas Torres Technical University, he graduated as a lawyer.

== Political career ==
He began his political career as a student leader. In 2010, he became the president of the parish board of Calderón in the San Lorenzo canton. He founded the Association of Parish Boards of San Lorenzo and the Association of Parish Boards of Esmeraldas.

In 2014, he was elected president of the National Council of Rural Parish Governments of Ecuador (CONAGOPARE). In June 2018, as the president of that organization, he represented Ecuador at the South American Summit of Successful Governments held in Lima, Peru, where he presented on his management and that of the Council in the country.

However, Armijos' presence as the president of CONAGOPARE was subject to controversy due to serious irregularities detected by the General Comptroller's Office in his administrative and financial management from January 2014 to June 2019. A report presented revealed multiple anomalies in the management of the council's resources, including the suspicious handling of millions of dollars in salaries for personnel with irregular contracts, consultancies, acquisitions and unjustified contracts, illegal transfers, unauthorized property purchases, and handling of donations without proper records.

It was also discovered that Armijos had used CONAGOPARE as a political platform, taking advantage of his position to launch his political party, Fuerza Rural y Productiva, in 2018, to run for the presidency of Ecuador in the 2021 presidential elections. However, he failed to register his political party with the National Electoral Council (CNE). Furthermore, Armijos tried to include a question in the 2018 popular consultation under the government of former President Lenín Moreno, which sought to eliminate prefectures and grant greater powers to parish governments.

In September 2019, he presented himself as a presidential pre-candidate for the Union for Hope (UNES) alliance, forming a ticket with Rafael Correa to participate in the 2021 presidential elections, but he was replaced by Andrés Arauz. However, he did participate as a candidate for assembly member for UNES in the legislative elections but did not win any seats.

Subsequently, he led the AMIGO movement, a political merger that aimed to represent peasants and social organizations. In 2020, he became involved in controversies related to his alleged involvement in the Balda case and his supposed connection with Raúl Chicaiza, who was implicated in the kidnapping of journalist Fernando Balda and mentioned Armijos in certain recorded dialogues that implicated him in money exchanges. However, no conclusive evidence was presented to prove Armijos' direct involvement in this case.

On May 17, 2023, the President of Ecuador, Guillermo Lasso, signed Executive Decree 741, activating Article 148 of the National Constitution, known as the "cross-death," arguing in his decree the "grave political crisis and internal commotion," thus calling for new elections.

Armijos registered his candidacy with the National Electoral Council (CNE) to run for the presidency of Ecuador under the AMIGO Political Movement in the anticipated presidential elections, with Linda Romero as his vice president. His candidacy was accepted on June 20, 2023.

In the elections, Armijos obtained 0.36%, finishing in eighth place.

== Controversies ==
In 2018, Armijos declared a net worth of $412,232 to the Internal Revenue Service of Ecuador (SRI). However, a year later, the General Comptroller's Office reported that his assets had increased to $2,080,200, representing a growth of 404%. Additionally, there were observations regarding contractual processes, institutional assets, agreements, and remuneration during his leadership in the National Council of Parish Governments of Ecuador. It was also revealed that he received in-kind donations worth $213,589 that were not reported in the accounting records.

According to the SRI, in 2018 he paid only $2,701 in taxes, but in the following years, this amount decreased significantly. In 2019, he paid $3.68, and between 2020 and 2021, he did not pay any taxes.

== See also ==
- 2023 Ecuadorian general election
