= Karina Subía =

Ecuadorian politician

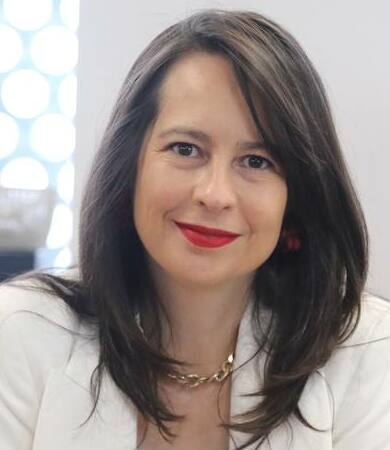
- in 2023
- Occupations: Lawyer; politician
- Known for: member of the National Assembly

Karina del Carmen Subía Dávalos is an Ecuadorian politician who became a member of the National Assembly in 2023.

== Life ==
Karina Subía studied law at the Pontifical Catholic University of Ecuador.

From 2013 to 2018 she was a lawyer in an independent law firm. In 2014 she worked for the Metropolitan District of Quito, in Mauricio Rodas's administration and was in charge of regulating illegal neighbourhood. She was then part of the judiciary council of Ecuador.

In 2023, she was a candidate for the alliance Avanza and Suma, led by Otto Sonnenholzner the former Ecuadorian vice-president and was elected to the National Assembly after the 2023 Ecuadorian general elections. She represents Actuemos and is a member of the Permanent Commission for Economic, Productive and Microenterprise Development after intense negotiations.
