= La Riba de Escalote =

- Municipality
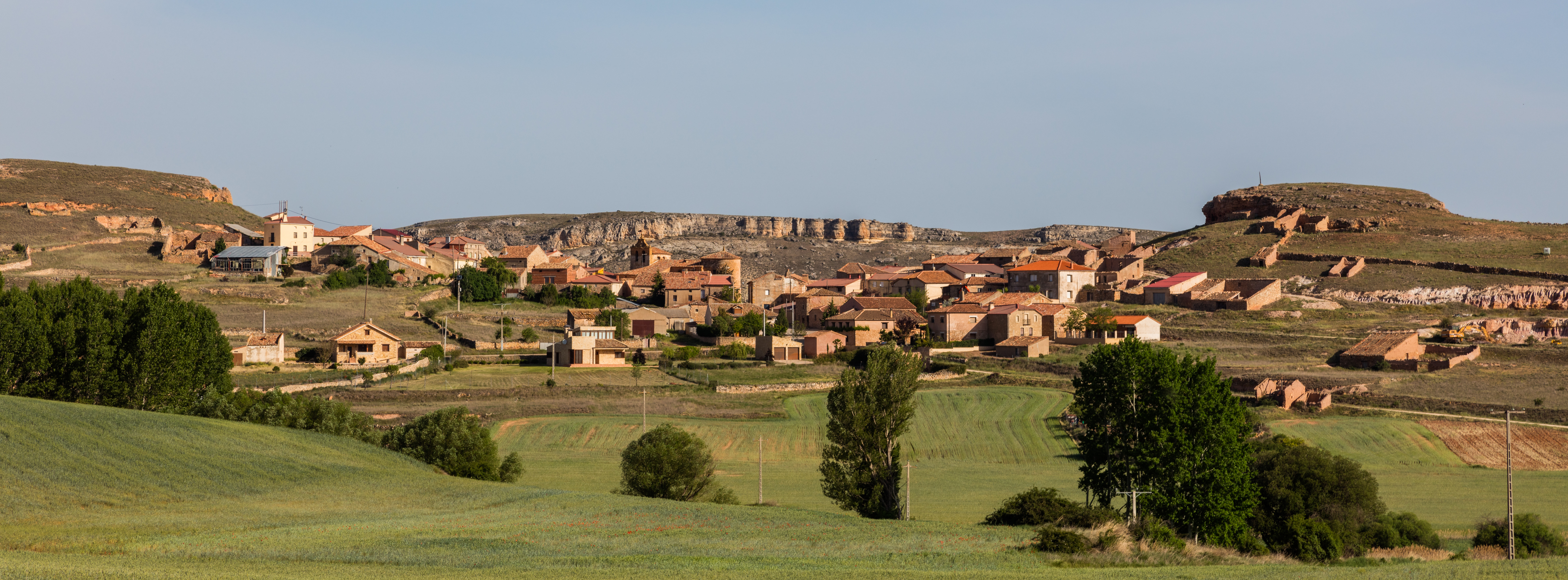

- La Riba de Escalote within Soria

- Location in Spain. La Riba de Escalote (Spain)
- Coordinates: 41°21′06″N 2°47′49″W
- Country: Spain
- Autonomous community: Castile and León
- Province: Soria
- Municipality: La Riba de Escalote

Area
  - Total: 23.44 km^{2} (9.05 sq mi)
- Elevation: 1,030 m (3,380 ft)

Population (2025-01-01)
  - Total: 9
  - Density: 0.38/km^{2} (0.99/sq mi)
- Time zone: UTC+1 (CET)
  - Summer (DST): UTC+2 (CEST)

La Riba de Escalote is a municipality located in the province of Soria, Castile and León, Spain. According to the 2004 census (INE), the municipality had a population of 25 inhabitants.
