= Jan Topić =

Ecuadorian businessman and presidential candidate

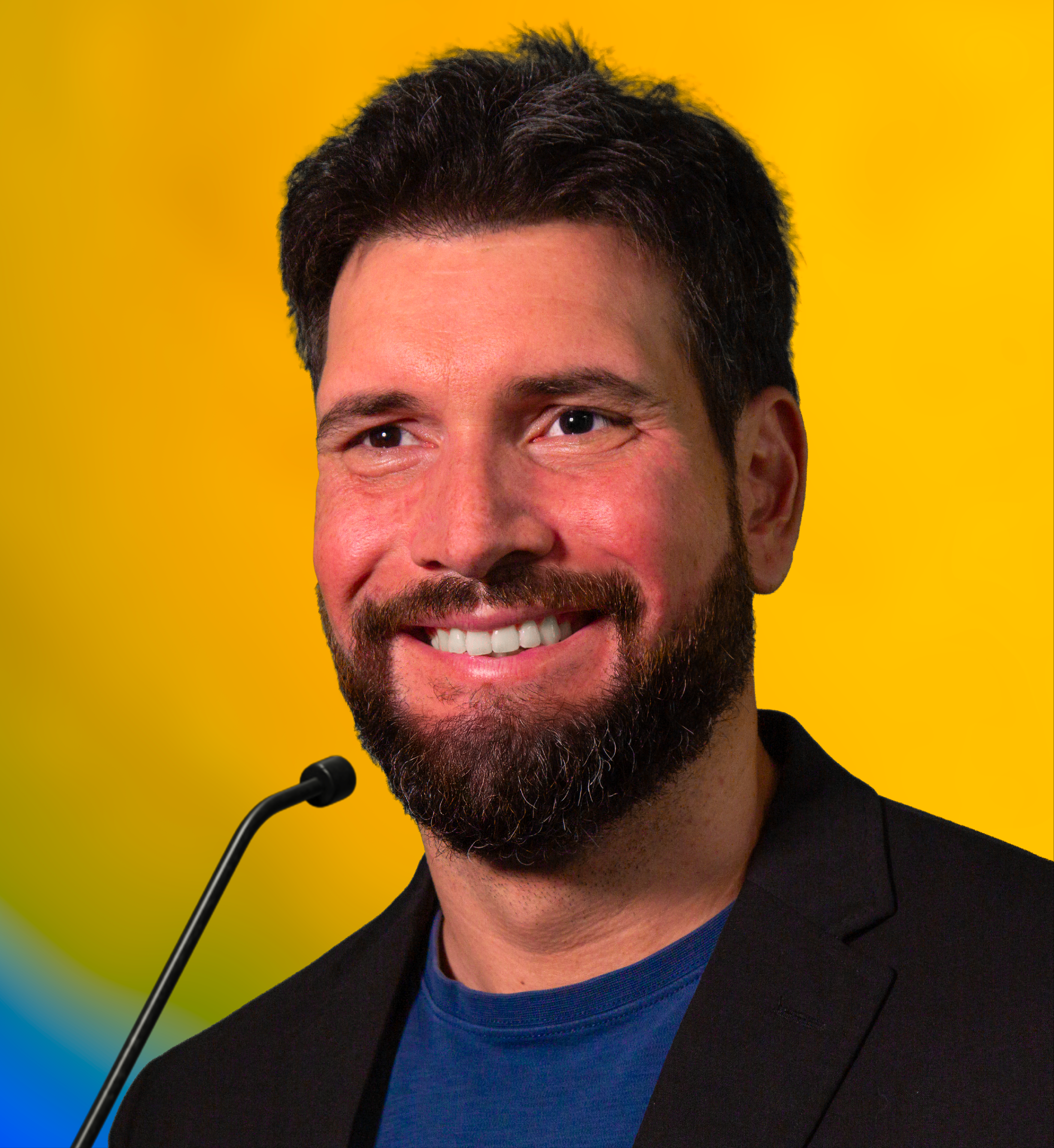
- Topić in 2025
- Born: Jan Tomislav Topić Feraud; 23 April 1983 (age 43); Guayaquil, Ecuador
- Education: University of Pennsylvania; London School of Economics
- Occupations: Businessman, economist, politician
- Political party: SUMA Party
- Relatives: Mara Topić (half-sister)

Jan Tomislav Topić Feraud (born 23 April 1983) is an Ecuadorian businessman, economist, and politician who ran for President of Ecuador in the 2023 Ecuadorian general election. He was eliminated in the first round held on 20 August 2023, coming fourth with 14.66% of the vote. He has served as president of Telconet since 2010. His alleged activities for the French Foreign Legion have raised concerns of Topić being a mercenary, a label that he denied. Prior to the 2023 Ecuadorian political crisis, he was briefly nominated to serve as Minister of Security by Guillermo Lasso.

== Early life ==
Topić was born in Guayaquil, Ecuador in 1983 to businessman Tomislav Topić. He is of Croatian heritage on his father's side. In 2005, he graduated from the University of Pennsylvania with a bachelor's degree in economics and business. He obtained his master's degree in economics in 2012 from the London School of Economics, his half-sister is the Miss Universe Ecuador 2024 Mara Topić.

== Military activities ==
He received military training in the French Foreign Legion and claimed to have fought in Ukraine during the Russian invasion and parts of Africa and Syria. For this fact he has been accused of being a mercenary; however, he claimed to be an "elite professional soldier" and to have fought for France because he had dual Ecuadorian-French nationality, between 2006 and 2012.

== Business career ==
He serves as president of Telconet, a company founded by his father; since 2010. He is an administrator in eight companies, among which are Academseg, Transcorpecuador, Inmobiliaria Leonortres and is a shareholder in seven companies.

In 2019, he was investigated for money laundering during the Odebrecht Case.

== Political career ==
In April 2023, he had been selected by President Guillermo Lasso to replace Minister of Security Diego Ordóñez. His nomination caused controversy because of the accusations made against Topić of being a mercenary. Although he accepted the position, Lasso ultimately decided not to appoint him and appointed Wagner Bravo instead.

=== 2023 presidential candidacy ===
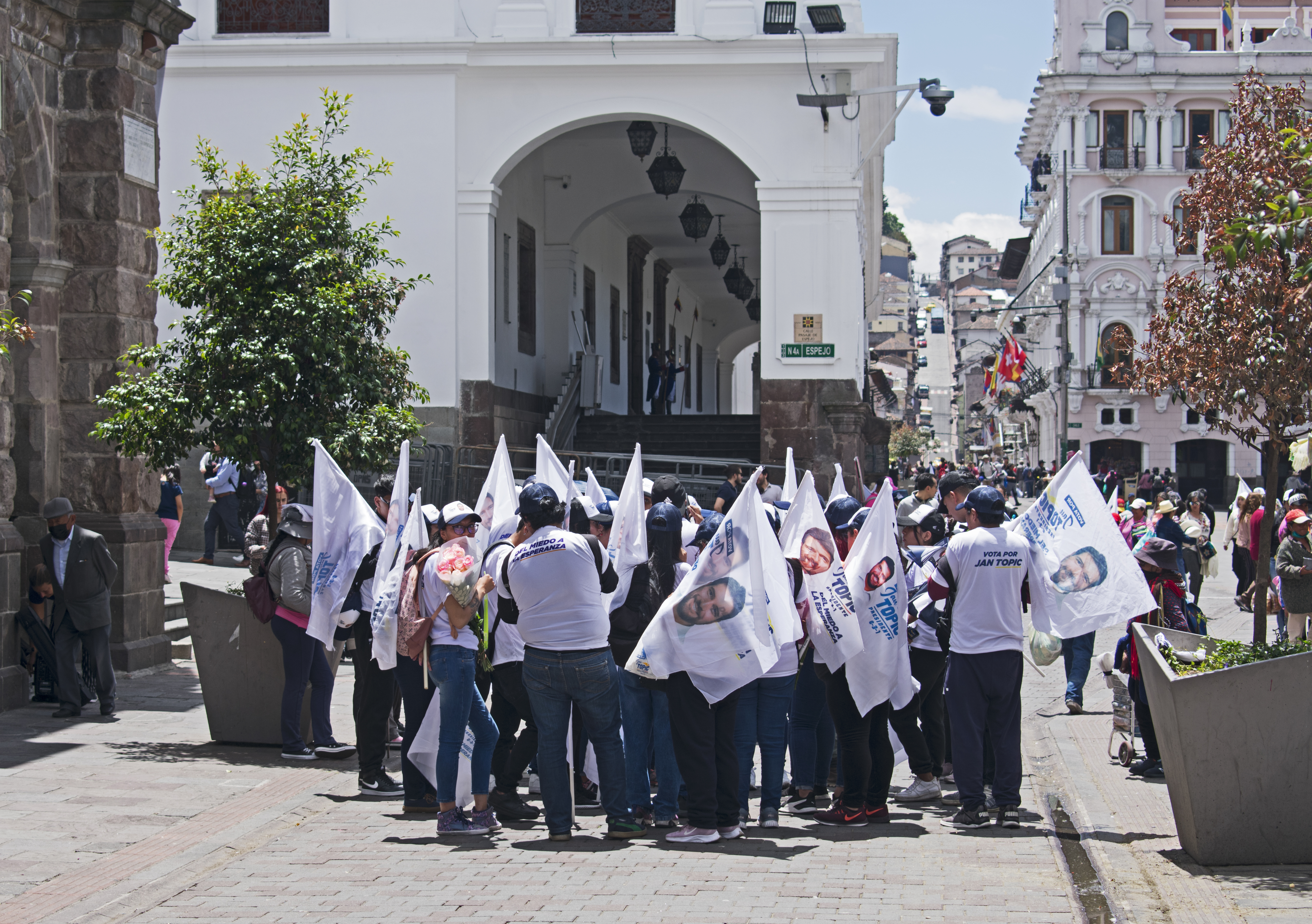
Topić supporters in the center of Quito four days before the vote

In May 2023, following the dissolution of the National Assembly, he announced his candidacy for president of Ecuador in the upcoming general election. His candidacy was supported by the Social Christian Party. Lawyer and 2021 candidate Pedro José Freile was briefly announced as his running mate, until the National Electoral Council ruled the 2023 election must have parity in candidacies between men and women. Journalist and lawyer Diana Jácome was later confirmed as Topic's running mate.

Two polls conducted on 9 August, the day of Fernando Villavicencio's assassination, found Topić in third place narrowly behind Villavicencio for second place with Luisa Gonzalez in first place. Following Villavicencio's assassination in a video released on social media, a criminal group known as Los Lobos claimed responsibility for the attack and threatened to assassinate Topić.

On 12 August, a poll found Topić narrowly behind Gonzalez for first place with 21.7% to Gonzalez's 24.9%. At the election, he came in fourth with 14.66% of the votes.

=== 2025 presidential candidacy ===
He was not allowed to run in the presidential elections of 2025 by the Electoral Contentious Tribunal. The tribunal ruled that Topic’s candidacy violated constitutional prohibitions. They found he had not properly divested from state contracts and remained a beneficiary of involved companies. He supported Luisa González against incumbent president Daniel Noboa.
