= Xavier Hervas =

Ecuadorian businessman and politician

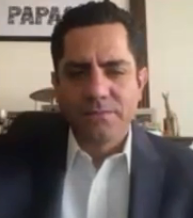
Hervas in 2021

Marcelo Xavier Hervas Mora (born 7 October 1972) is an Ecuadorian businessman and politician who unsuccessfully ran for President of Ecuador in the 2023 election. He previously ran for president in the 2021 election as the Democratic Left nominee, being eliminated in the first round. Hervas was born in Guayaquil, Ecuador. He is president of the company NovaAlimentos SA.

Hervas was also president of the engineering faculty at the University of La Sabana in Colombia. He is also a shareholder of the Metropolitan Hospital in Quito, one of the country's largest hospitals.

His 2021 presidential campaign was popular on social media such as TikTok for his progressive stance on legalizing abortion, marijuana and LGBTQ+ related issues. After being eliminated in the first round, he endorsed Guillermo Lasso in the run-off. After Lasso assumed the presidency, he became one of his strongest critics.

In March 2022, President Lasso accused Hervas of blackmailing him in exchange for tax favors, a claim that Hervas denounced.

In June 2023, Hervas officially became a presidential candidate for the 2023 election and was endorsed by the RETO Movement. He was eliminated in the first round of the presidential election, receiving 0.49% of the vote.
