= Otto Sonnenholzner =

Vice President of Ecuador from 2018 to 2020

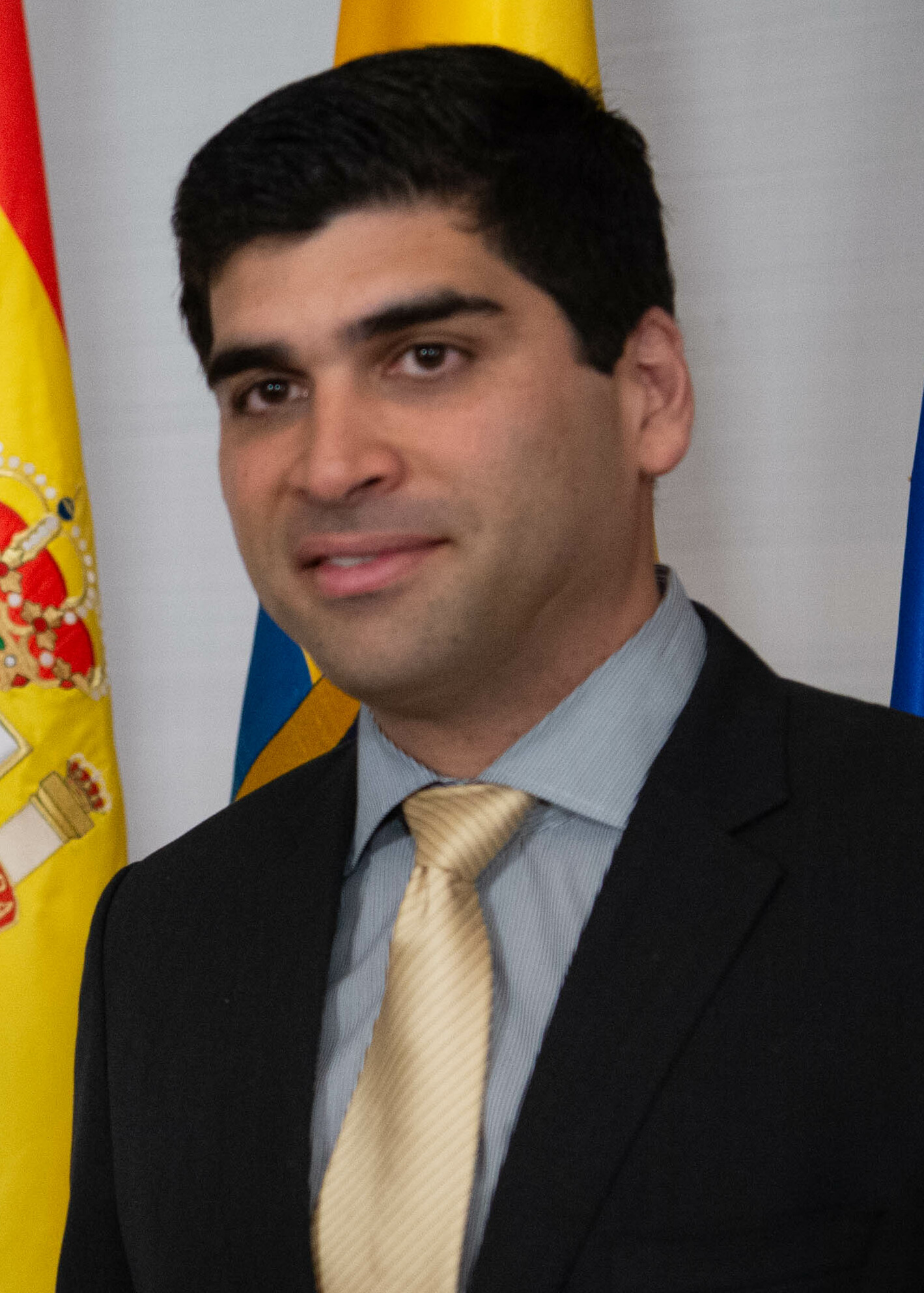

50th Vice President of Ecuador
- In office 11 December 2018 – 10 July 2020
- President: Lenín Moreno
- Preceded by: María Alejandra Vicuña
- Succeeded by: María Alejandra Muñoz

Personal details
- Born: Otto Ramón Sonnenholzner Sper; 19 March 1983 (age 43) Guayaquil, Ecuador
- Party: Independent
- Spouse: Claudia Salem Barakat
- Education: Schiller International University; German School of Guayaquil
- Occupation: Broadcaster, journalist, economist, politician

Otto Ramón Sonnenholzner Sper (Spanish pronunciation: [ˈoto raˈmon soneŋˈxol(t)sneɾ esˈpeɾ], German pronunciation: [ˈɔto ʁaˈmɔn ˈzɔnənˌhɔltsnɐ ˈspɛʁ]; born 19 March 1983) is an Ecuadorian radio broadcaster, politician, and economist who served as the 50th Vice President of Ecuador from December 2018 to July 2020. He was a candidate for President of Ecuador in the 2023 general election.

== Early life ==
Otto Sonnenholzner was born in Guayaquil on March 19, 1983, to German-Ecuadorian father Ramón Sonnenholzner and a Lebanese mother. After studying social sciences, communication and international economics in Ecuador, Germany, and Spain, he became speaker and general manager of Tropicana radio, then president of the Ecuadorian Association of broadcasting (AER). He teaches at the University of Guayaquil.

== Vice presidency ==
After the resignation of María Alejandra Vicuña in December 2018, and at the proposal of President Lenín Moreno, the National Assembly of Ecuador entrusted him with the office of vice-president.

On July 7, 2020, Otto resigned from his position as Vice President due to the 2019–20 coronavirus pandemic outbreak in Guayaquil. He left office in the middle of several corruption scandals affecting Moreno's administration.

== Post-political career ==
He signed the Madrid Charter, a document drafted by the far-right Spanish party Vox that describes Communist groups as enemies of Ibero-America involved in a "criminal project" that is "under the umbrella of the Cuban regime".

=== 2023 presidential campaign ===
Following the 2023 political crisis, Sonnenholzner announced his candidacy for President of Ecuador in the 2023 election. He received only 7.09% of the vote in the first round of the election.

== Personal life ==
He has three children with his wife, Claudia Salem Barakat.
