= San Lorenzo Canton =

- Canton
- Nickname: Sanloro
- Motto: "The land of rain and the sun."
- San Lorenzo Canton in Esmeraldas Province
- Coordinates: 1.2658°N 78.8414°W
- Country: Ecuador
- Province: Esmeraldas Province
- Established: 2019-2023

Government
  - Type: Local Government Council
  - Alcalde: Glenn Arroyo

Area
  - Total: 3,096 km^{2} (1,195 sq mi)

Population (2022 census)
  - Total: 48,391
  - Density: 15.63/km^{2} (40.48/sq mi)
- Time zone: UTC-5 (ECT)

San Lorenzo Canton is a canton of Ecuador, located in the Esmeraldas Province. Its capital is the town of San Lorenzo. Its population at the 2001 census was 28,180

== Demographics ==
Ethnic groups as of the Ecuadorian census of 2010:

- Afro-Ecuadorian 72.2%
- Mestizo 19.1%
- Indigenous 5.3%
- White 2.6%
- Montubio 0.6%
- Other 0.3%
