= Muerte cruzada =

Clause of the Constitution of Ecuador

In Ecuadorian politics, muerte cruzada (Spanish pronunciation: [ˈmweɾte kɾuˈsaða]; 'mutual death', lit. 'cross death') is the name commonly given to a mechanism governing the impeachment of the president of Ecuador and the dissolution of the National Assembly provided for in Articles 130 and 148 of the 2008 Constitution.

Article 148 grants the president the power to dissolve the National Assembly, but only at the price of giving the electorate the opportunity to vote the president out of office. The mechanism requires that a special election be held following dissolution, in which a new president and vice-president and a new National Assembly are elected. The candidates elected – to both the executive and legislative branches – then serve out the remainder of the current presidential and legislative terms. A regular election for a full four-year period of office then takes place, in keeping with the normal electoral calendar.

Article 130 provides similarly in the event of a successful impeachment of the president: a sitting president can be removed from office by two thirds of the members of the National Assembly (92 votes out of 137), but if a president is removed in this way, fresh elections must be held to elect a new president and a new National Assembly to serve out the remainder of the current term of office.

Thus, the "mutual death" aspect of the provisions arises from one key element: "in dissolving a branch of government, the other branch offers up its own continuity in office for the electorate to decide upon: in other words, elections are called with respect to both the dismissed branch of government and the branch that requested the dismissal."

The muerte cruzada provision was introduced as a means of avoiding the protracted periods of political paralysis that had characterised Ecuador under previous constitutions. It has been called both a nuclear option and a plebiscite on the president's mandate. A September 2010 judgement by the Constitutional Court described it as "a checks-and-balances tool that seeks to balance one branch of government against another".

== Constitutional text ==
Article 148 of the 2008 Constitution provides as follows:

The President of the Republic may dissolve the National Assembly when, in his or her judgement, it has assumed functions that are not within its constitutional competence, subject to the favourable opinion of the Constitutional Court; when it repeatedly and unjustifiably obstructs the execution of the National Development Plan, or because of a serious political crisis and domestic upheaval. This power may be exercised only once during the first three years of the President's term of office. Following a maximum of seven days after the publication of the decree of dissolution, the National Electoral Council shall call for legislative and presidential elections to be held, on the same date, for the remainder of the respective periods. Until the National Assembly is installed, the President of the Republic may, subject to the favourable opinion of the Constitutional Court, issue urgent economic decree-laws, which may be approved or overturned by the legislature.

Article 130 reads:

The National Assembly shall be able to remove the President of the Republic from office in the following cases: (1) for assuming functions that do not come under his/her competence, subject to the favourable ruling of the Constitutional Court; (2) because of a serious political crisis and domestic upheaval. Within 72 hours of the conclusion of the procedure provided for by law, the National Assembly shall issue a ruling, with a statement of its reasons, on the basis of the evidence for his/her defence submitted by the President of the Republic. To proceed with the removal from office, the favourable vote of two thirds of the members of the National Assembly shall be required. If the President's removal from office is adopted, the Vice-President shall assume the office of President of the Republic. This power may only be exercised once during the legislative period, during its first three years. Within a maximum of seven days after publication of the ruling removing the President from office, the National Electoral Council shall call for legislative and presidential elections to be held, on the same date, for the remainder of the respective periods of office.

== 2023 activation ==
Muerte cruzada was triggered for the first time on 17 May 2023 by President Guillermo Lasso after the opposition-led National Assembly had brought impeachment proceedings against him on charges of embezzlement. In the decree announcing the measure, Lasso said that his decision had been motivated by the existence of a "severe political crisis and domestic upheaval".

As a result, special presidential and legislative elections were held in 2023, ahead of their scheduled date in 2025, and the impeachment proceedings were voided. Both Lasso and the incumbent members of the National Assembly were eligible for re-election; on 18 May, however, Lasso announced that he would not be standing. Daniel Noboa won the 2023 Ecuadorian general election.

== See also ==
- Aut simul stabunt aut simul cadent
