= 2023 Ecuadorian political crisis =

Event in Ecuador

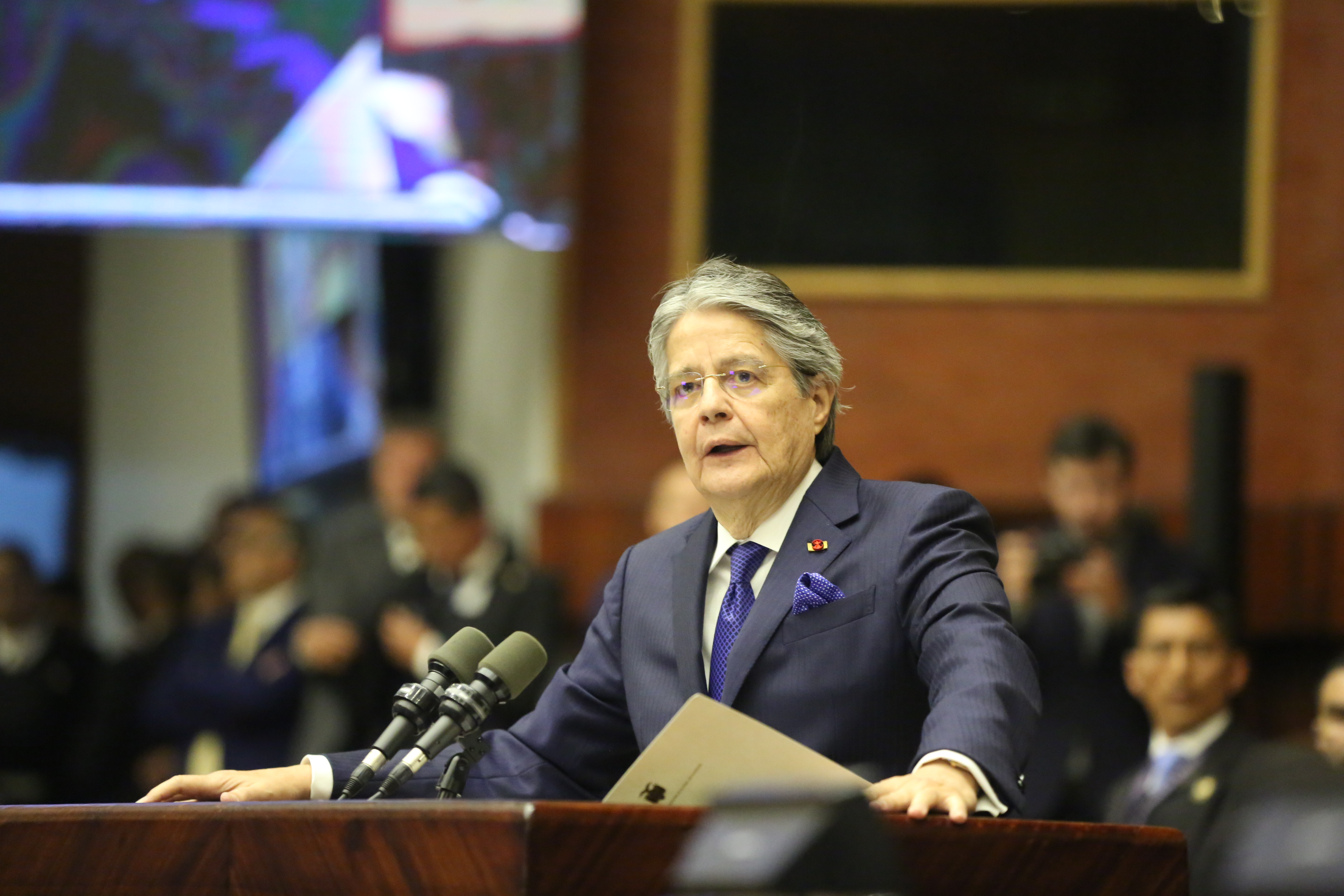
- Lasso appearing before the National Assembly during his impeachment inquiry on 16 May 2023, the day before he invoked muerte cruzada
- Date: 17 May 2023 – 24 May 2023
- Location: Ecuador
- Type: Parliamentary crisis
- Cause: President Guillermo Lasso invoked muerte cruzada ('mutual death')
- Outcome: Dissolution of the National Assembly; 2023 general election triggered

A political crisis began in Ecuador on 17 May 2023 as a result of the impeachment trial against President Guillermo Lasso. The impeachment inquiry began in the National Assembly on 9 May and lasted until 17 May when Lasso dissolved parliament through the constitutional provision known as muerte cruzada ('mutual death'). That triggered the end of the impeachment inquiry as it dissolved the National Assembly and caused an earlier general election. The mutual dissolution marks the first time this constitutional measure has been triggered by an Ecuadorian president.

== Background ==
=== Pandora Papers ===
President Guillermo Lasso faced various challenges regarding reported corruption during his tenure of two years. In the Pandora Papers leak by the International Consortium of Investigative Journalists (ICIJ), Lasso faced his first controversy in October 2021 when it was reported that he had foreign bank accounts in a tax haven created in an effort to prevent others from seeing his net worth; an act that is illegal for public officials in Ecuador. Lasso responded by saying he would be transparent with the ICIJ, stating that he had removed assets from his foreign accounts legally. A congressional committee attempted to begin a process to remove Lasso from office, though this was blocked by his government. The investigation of Lasso was filed by the Comptroller of Ecuador.

=== El Gran Padrino scandal ===
On 9 January 2023, La Posta published a report titled El Gran Padrino ("The Great Godfather"), in which it detailed an alleged corruption plot within public companies centered around Danilo Carrera Drouet, brother-in-law of President Guillermo Lasso. La Posta later presented audio recordings of Carrera's associate, Rubén Cherres, saying that he provided $1.5 million for the presidential campaign of Lasso during the 2021 Ecuadorian general election. Subsequent investigations reported links between Lasso and the Albanian mafia through Cherres, who was linked to Dritan Gjika, an Albanian individual who was reportedly using shell companies in Ecuador for drug trafficking. Ecuadorian authorities began to pursue Cherres on 16 January.

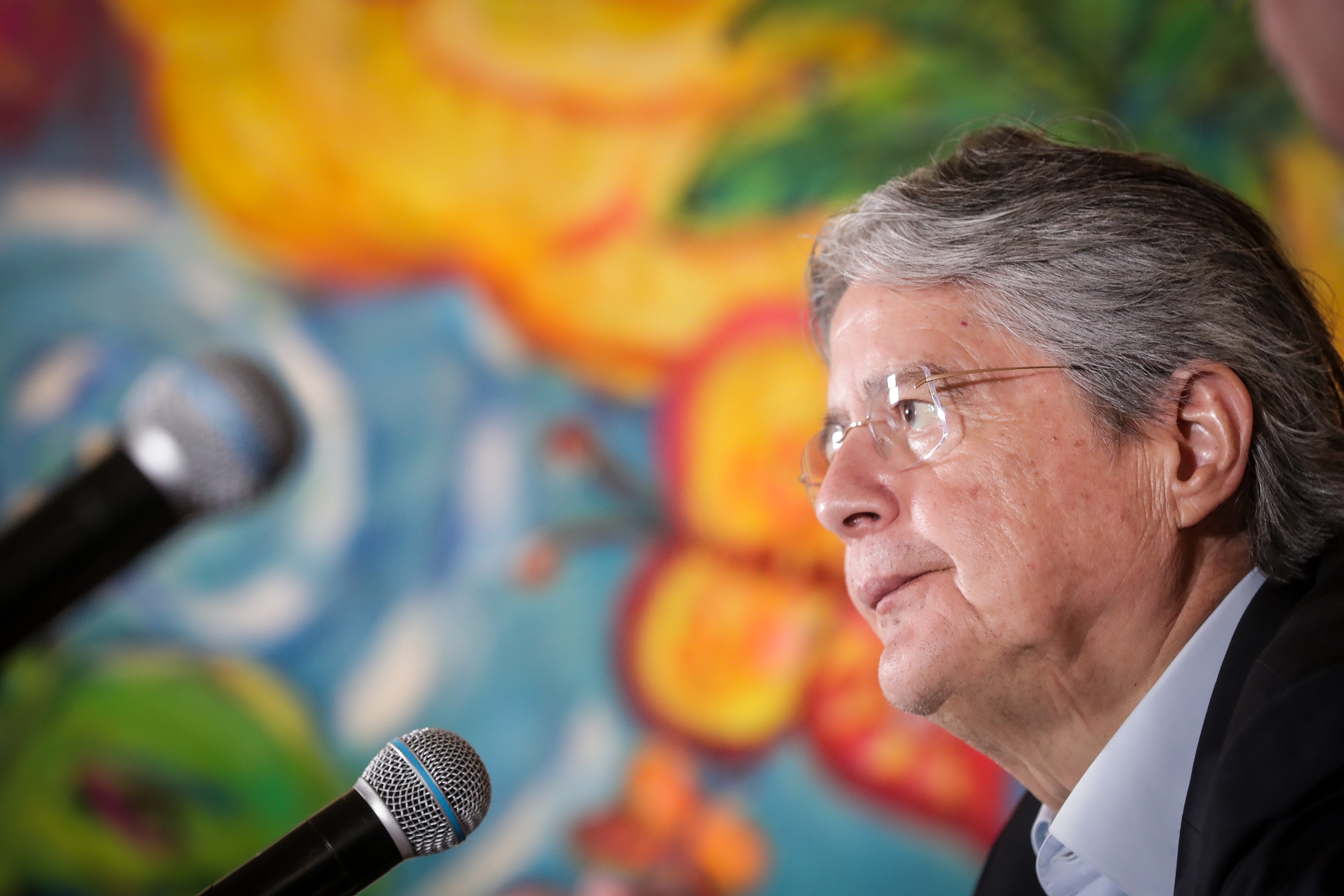
Lasso in March 2023

Following the publication, on 18 January 2023 the National Assembly created a commission for "truth, justice and the fight against corruption" in the alleged corruption case against Lasso. Although Carrera held no official position in the Lasso administration, several former officials claimed that he played an important advisory role to the president and was a powerful figure in the presidential palace. In particular, he accompanied Lasso on his trip to Washington, DC in December 2022.

La Posta presented before the legislative commission reports that Chérres and Carrera were tasked to control two government agencies; the Customs Office and the Ministry of Energy, with the first office reportedly helping with the trafficking of weapons and drugs while the latter allowed the laundering of drug trafficking funds. About 35,000 documents were provided by La Posta reporting illicit activities between Chérres and Carrera. On 24 February, the attorney general announced a new investigation into Lasso's dismissal of a police investigation into Cherres' ties to a drug trafficking ring. The charges alleged that Lasso pressured the state police commander and the drug chief to conceal the investigation report. After investigations were carried out, a non-binding report was presented that permitted the Assembly to initiate impeachment proceedings against the president on 4 March 2023.

The impeachment process began on 16 March, and on 29 March the Constitutional Court approved the charge of embezzlement against Lasso, but dismissed the two charges of bribery. The BBC noted that since 88 lawmakers had previously voted in favor of the impeachment trial, it meant that Lasso faced the possibility of being removed from power. Cherres, considered a key witness in the case, was found murdered beside four other individuals two days later on 31 March, with their bodies showing signs of torture.

On 16 May 2023, the National Assembly officially began impeachment proceedings against Lasso. During his testimony, Lasso called the impeachment proceedings politically motivated. However the following day, Lasso dissolved the National Assembly, invoking the constitutional measure known as muerte cruzada.

== Political crisis ==
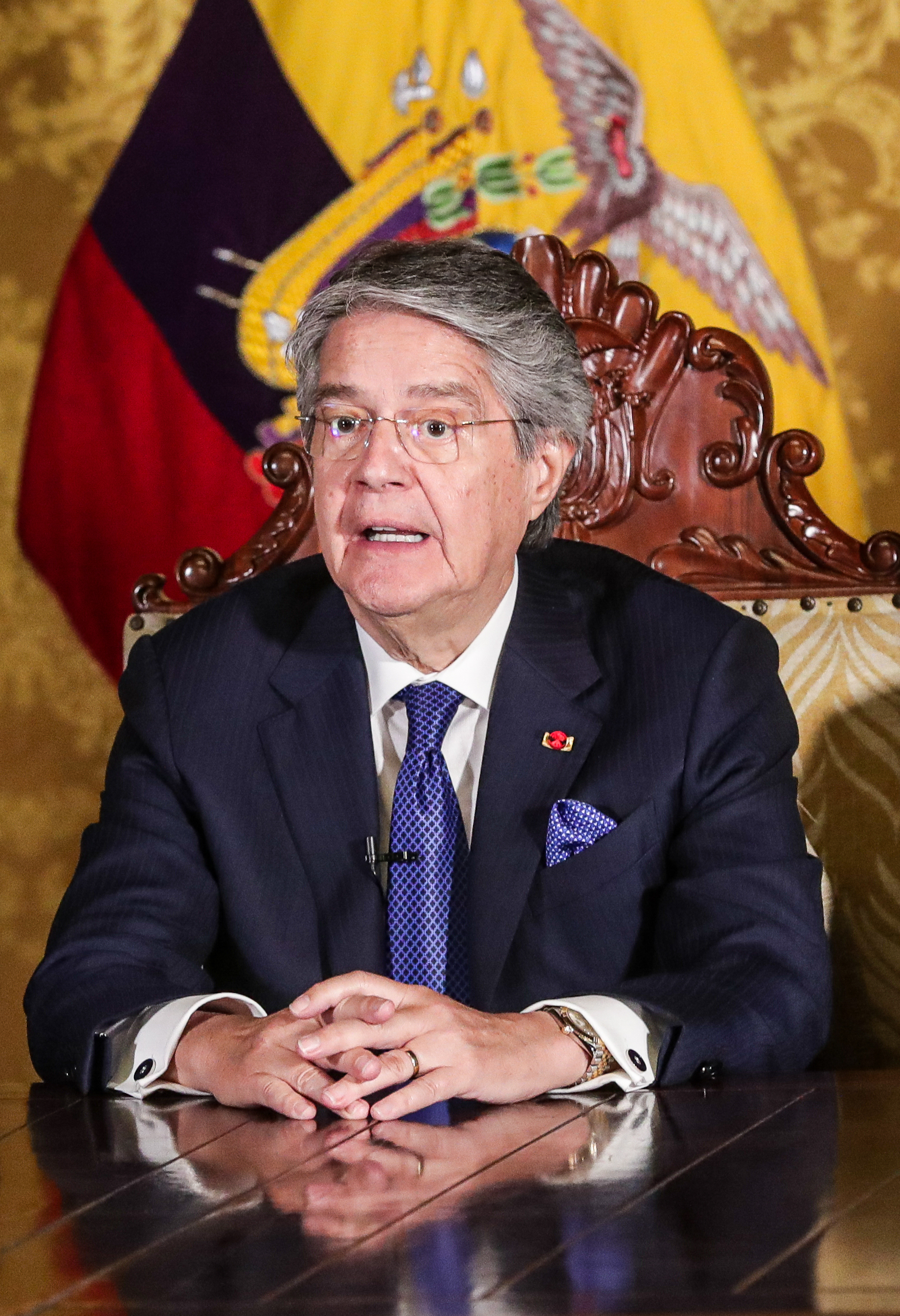
Guillermo Lasso announcing the muerte cruzada decree

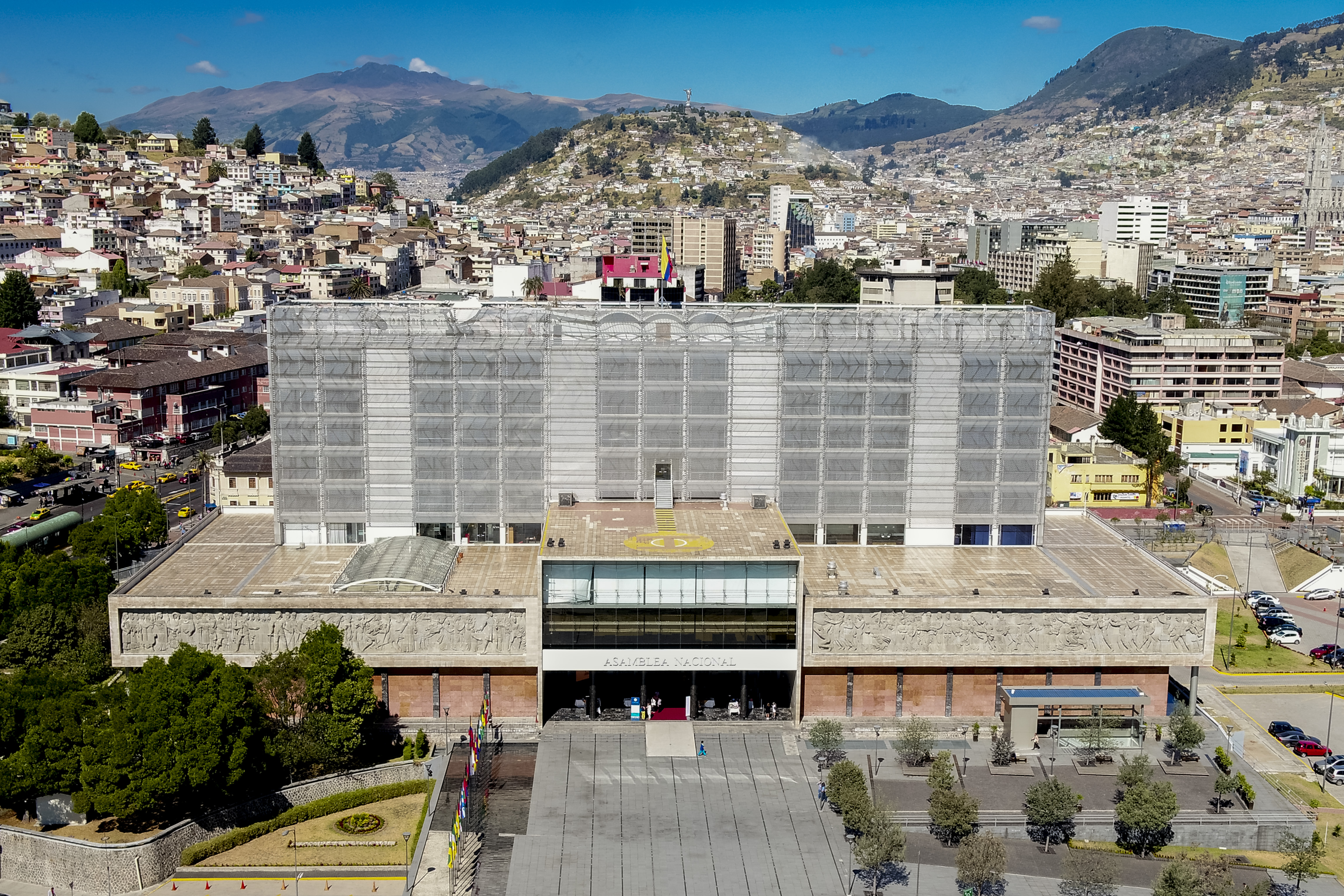
Following Lasso's muerte cruzada decree, he ordered the militarization of the Legislative Palace of the National Assembly on 17 May 2023

On 17 May 2023, Lasso invoked the muerte cruzada constitutional measure while accusing the lawmakers who pushed for his ousting of focusing "on destabilizing the government". This mechanism allows the president to dissolve the National Assembly, and call for earlier presidential and legislative elections. During the period leading up to the special election, Lasso would govern Ecuador under decree. That same day, Lasso ordered the militarization of the Legislative Palace in Quito, preventing access to the personnel working in the building and to the assembly members, who planned to continue with the session debating the president's impeachment. This was the first time in which an Ecuadorian president used this constitutional measure to avoid impeachment.

On the same day that he dissolved the parliament, Lasso issued a decree-law granting tax cuts for the middle class in the country; this was heavily criticized, however, and an appeal to stop him was filed within hours. He justified invoking the constitutional measure by calling it the best solution and said he wanted to give the Ecuadorian people the "power to decide" the country's future in the upcoming election. The Confederation of Indigenous Nationalities of Ecuador condemned Lasso's actions and threatened to protest, while a spokesperson for the Ministry of National Defence said they would "crack down" on any violent protests. Commentators have noted that much of the country's military and police forces supported Lasso's decree and defended it as constitutional.

After muerte cruzada was invoked, the former Assembly members of the Democratic Left and the Social Christian Party asked the Constitutional Court to rule on the unconstitutionality of the decree, arguing that the president's decision had no legal merit.

On 18 May, several members of the National Assembly who were ousted by Lasso's decree publicly denounced it and questioned its constitutional merit because the country was not facing an urgent crisis at the time it was invoked. Former Assembly President Virgilio Saquicela filed a lawsuit before the Constitutional Court against Lasso's decree calling it unconstitutional. The same day, Minister of Government Henry Cucalón defended Lasso's actions, saying that he had the constitutional authority to invoke the decree. On the night of 18 May, the Constitutional Court unanimously rejected the legislators' petition of unconstitutionality.

The National Electoral Council (CNE) met to prepare the new general election. In a press conference, the president of the CNE, Diana Atamaint, said that the first round of elections would be held on 20 August and if there was a runoff, it would be on 15 October, so tentatively, the new president would take office in November 2023. Following Lasso's decree, former Vice President Otto Sonnenholzner and former Assemblyman Fernando Villavicencio announced their presidential candidacies. In an interview with The Washington Post on 19 May, Lasso himself said he had no plans to stand for re-election.

Before the first round of the presidential election, one of the candidates, Fernando Villavicencio, was assassinated, and the state of emergency was introduced for two months in the whole country. None of the candidates got more than 50% votes, and the second round was held on 15 October between Luisa González and Daniel Noboa, which the latter won.

== Reactions ==
=== Domestic ===
- Former president Rafael Correa called Lasso's presidential decree "illegal" and affirmed that "obviously there is no internal upheaval", as the president argued. "In any case, it is a great opportunity to send Lasso, his government and his legislators out of office." Correa would also say to Lasso, "you should have been dismissed and imprisoned since the Pandora Papers scandal."
- Former president Lenín Moreno asked for calm within the country to prevent a repetition of the results of the February 2023 local elections, which had been a major victory for Correa's party. He also called for "unity, humility and detachment in the face of the uncertain political and social scenario that Ecuador is experiencing."
- Former mayor of Guayaquil Jaime Nebot said that Lasso's action in invoking muerte cruzada was "unconstitutional, without legal effect, problematic and a dictatorship in disguise."

=== International ===
- Bolivia: Former president Evo Morales criticized Lasso for invoking the decree to avoid "prosecution for corruption" and questioned why Lasso was able to remain in office, whereas former Peruvian president Pedro Castillo was prosecuted for "doing the same".
- Chile: The government expressed their hope that the crisis would be resolved through "democratic and institutional mechanisms (available) in its constitution, with strict adherence to and respect for the rule of law".
- Mexico: President Andrés Manuel López Obrador expressed doubts that Lasso's decree would bring instability to the nation and hoped that the upcoming general election would provide a resolution to the crisis.
- Peru: The Peruvian Ministry of Foreign Affairs indicated their support for Lasso and that President Dina Boluarte supports the "democratic process of the Republic of Ecuador".
- United States: The United States Department of State said that the country "supports the democratic institutions in Ecuador".

== See also ==
- 2022 Ecuadorian protests
