= 2021 Ecuadorian general election =

- 7 February 2021; 11 April 2021 (runoff)
- Presidential election
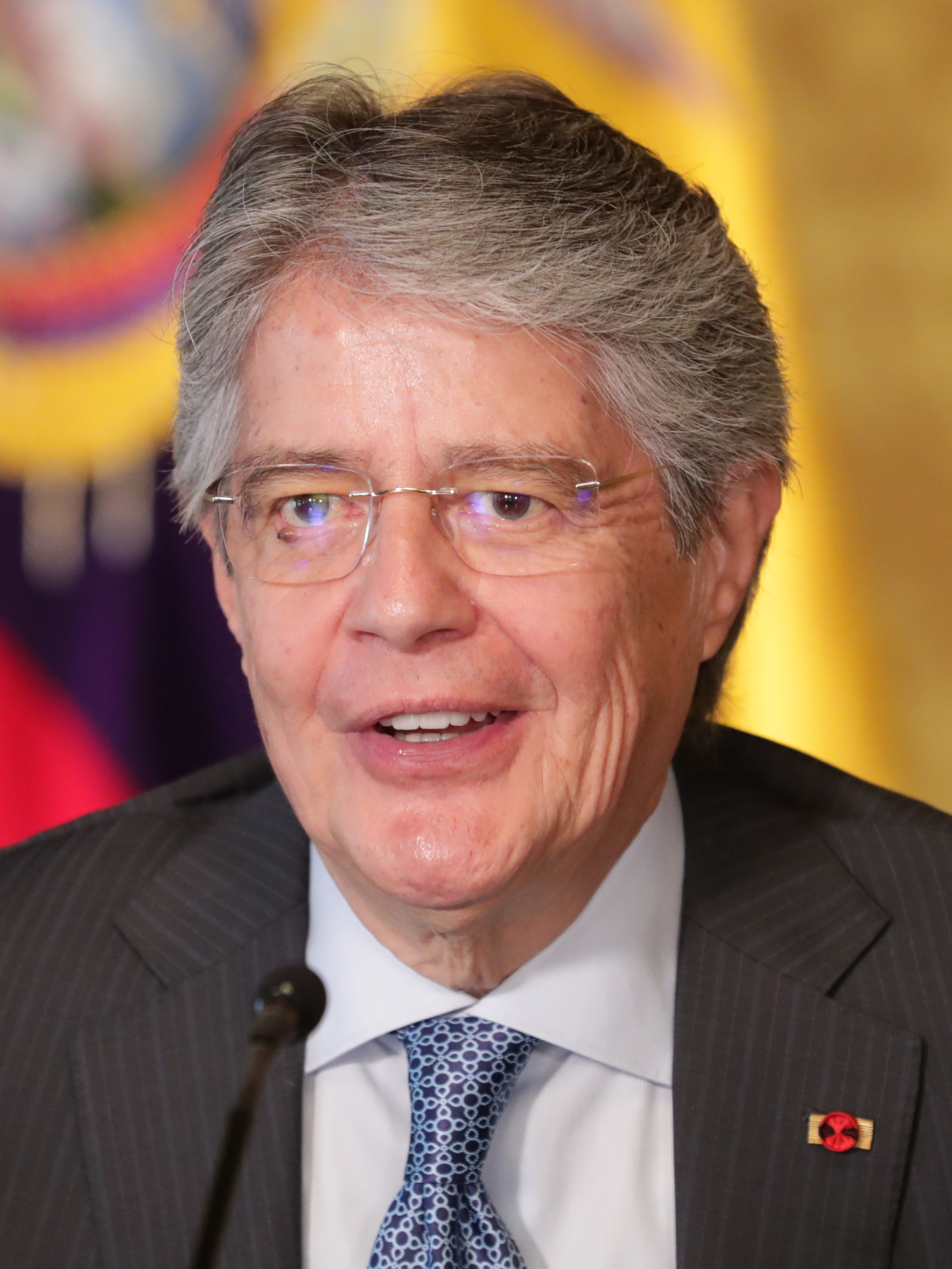

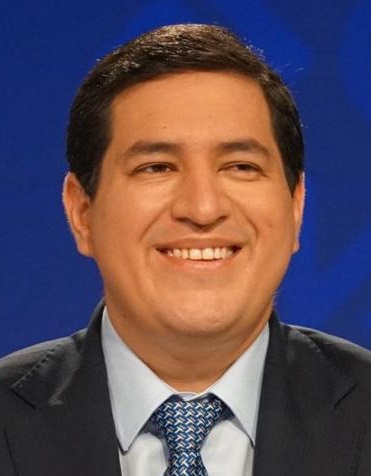
Candidate	Guillermo Lasso	Andrés Arauz
Party	CREO	RC
Alliance	CREO–PSC	UNES
Running mate	Alfredo Borrero	Carlos Rabascall
Votes	4,656,426	4,236,515
Percentage	52.36%	47.64%
President before election
Lenín Moreno
Independent
Elected President
Guillermo Lasso
CREO
- Parliamentary election
- All 137 seats in the National Assembly; 69 seats needed for a majority
Party	Leader	Vote %	Seats	+/–
UNES	Pierina Correa	32.21	49	New
Pachakutik	Salvador Quishpe	16.81	27	+23
ID	Wilma Andrade	11.98	18	+14
PSC	Henry Kronfle	9.73	18	+2
CREO	César Monge	9.65	12	−22
MC–PSE	Fernando Villavicencio	3.76	2	+2
EU	Rocío Juca	2.08	2	New
Avanza	Javier Orti	1.93	2	+2
PSP	Ximena Bohórquez	1.81	1	−1
DSí	Xavier Zavala	1.05	1	New
UE	César Rodríguez	0.74	1	+1
Construye	Andrés Briones	0.72	1	New
Local lists	–	–	3	0
This lists parties that won seats. See the complete results below.
National Assembly President before	National Assembly President after
César Litardo; PAIS Alliance	Guadalupe Llori; Pachakutik

General elections were held in Ecuador on 7 February 2021, established by the National Electoral Council (CNE) as the date for the first round of the presidential election and a vote on mining in Cuenca. Incumbent president Lenín Moreno, who had held the office since his victory over Guillermo Lasso in 2017, did not seek reelection. Although delaying the election due to the COVID-19 pandemic was discussed, the CNE announced on 15 December 2020 that the electoral calendar would not shift and confirmed elections would take place in February 2021.

In first round results, Andrés Arauz had a significant but not large enough lead to avoid a runoff with Lasso, who had narrowly beaten third-place finisher Yaku Pérez. Final results were delayed due to a requested recount of votes in some provinces. On 19 February, the CNE confirmed Lasso would be Arauz's rival in the second round. On 11 April, Lasso defeated Arauz, which some news outlets called an upset victory. Lasso was inaugurated on 24 May.

== Background ==
The previous Ecuadorian general election, on 19 February 2017 (alongside a referendum on tax havens) saw voters elect a new president and National Assembly. Incumbent President Rafael Correa, of the PAIS Alliance, had already served two terms and was ineligible for reelection. In the first round of presidential elections, PAIS Alliance candidate Lenín Moreno received 39% of the vote. Although he was more than 10% ahead of his nearest rival, Guillermo Lasso of the Creating Opportunities party, he was short of the 40% threshold required to avoid a run-off, and a second round was held on 2 April. In the second round Moreno was elected president with 51.16% of the vote; the National Electoral Council announced on 13 April that it would recount all ballots contested by both parties (accounting to about 10% of the total vote), after which Moreno was awarded an additional 1,594 votes and retained his majority.

Incumbent president Lenín Moreno's approval rating dropped drastically from 77% after his election in 2017 to only 7% of approval by end of 2019.

Francis Fukuyama described 2020 as having brought "mostly bad news regarding the state of global democracy" in a 15 December 2020 The Wall Street Journal article, specifically citing Ecuador as an example of "severe crises of authority" due to the economic recession triggered by the COVID-19 pandemic.

== Electoral system ==
The president is elected using a modified two-round system, with a candidate required to get over 50% of the vote, or get over 40% of the vote and be 10% ahead of their nearest rival to be elected in the first round. The president is limited to two consecutive four-year terms.

Members of the National Assembly are elected by three methods. Fifteen are elected by closed list proportional representation in a nationwide constituency. Six are elected by overseas voters (two each from Canada/United States, Latin America and Asia/Europe/Oceania). The remaining 116 members are elected from multi-member constituencies by closed list proportional representation, with all seats allocated using the Webster method. Members of the National Assembly are limited to two four-year terms, either consecutive or not. There are gender quotas for the party lists, meaning there is alternation between men and women. There are no quotas for minority representation.

Alongside the presidential and legislative elections, a referendum was held in the city of Cuenca, asking voters whether to prohibit mining near five different rivers to protect the ecosystem. The voters were asked to answer yes or no to prohibit mining in each area.

== Presidential candidates ==
=== Andrés Arauz ===
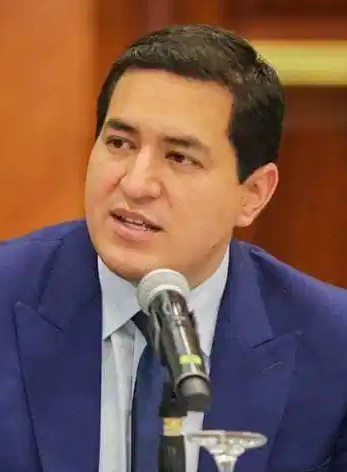
Andrés Arauz

As ex-president Rafael Correa's Citizen Revolution Movement party (a breakaway from the ruling PAIS Alliance) was unable to register as a party, on 18 August 2020 the political coalition Unión por la Esperanza (UNES), comprising the parties Centro Democrático (a Guayas-based centrist party led by Jimmy Jairala) and Fuerza Compromiso Social (a centre-left party that before 2018 had been opposed to Correa), announced that its presidential candidate would be former Correa minister Andrés Arauz with Correa as his running mate. Arauz is an economist, previously a banker (until 2015) and Minister of Knowledge and Human Talent from 2015 to 2017, and a "largely unknown" political figure. However, the vice presidential position on the ticket for Correa, president of Ecuador from 2007 to 2017, was rejected by Ecuador's National Electoral Council (CNE), as he had been convicted for corruption. Carlos Rabascall was then selected as Arauz's running mate.

Arauz has promised to scrap the current International Monetary Fund (IMF) austerity plan approved by the incumbent president, stating it will undermine Ecuadorian families and growth and that it has been overly favorable to creditors. He wants to continue making debts payments to bondholders but says that public spending would take priority. He wants to respect existing mining concessions, but would seek greater community participation and conduct reviews of compliance with environmental and investment plans. Arauz has also promised to give one million families a $1,000 payment in the first week of office. He has also proposed transforming the current extractivist model toward a model based on the knowledge economy and biodiversity. When asked about decriminalizing abortion, he has stated that he personally believes it should be allowed in certain circumstances, but that a debate about it should be promoted by society. Electoral authorities announced on 5 February that Arauz, who then led in the polls, would not be allowed to vote because his main residency is registered in Mexico where he completed his PhD.

=== Guillermo Lasso ===
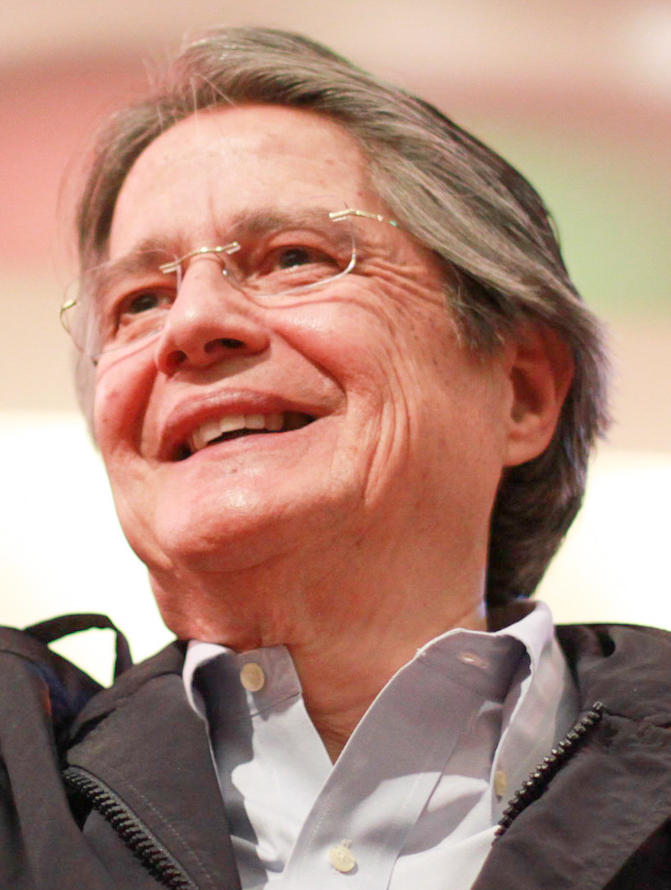
Guillermo Lasso

Alianza CREO-PSC, a coalition of the centre-right/conservative Movimiento CREO and Partido Social Cristiano parties, advanced businessman and candidate in the previous two elections Guillermo Lasso as its candidate, with Alfredo Borrero Vega as vice-presidential candidate. Lasso proposes a government plan focused on job creation, promising that through the opening of the market and relaxation of hiring, it will be possible to create 2 million new jobs in the country, promote foreign investment, economic liberalization, greater partnership between the public and private sectors, economic reactivation through the reduction of taxes, implementation of free zones, concession the management of public companies to the private sector, fight against corruption and guarantee a better public health service coordinated by its vice-presidential candidate Alfredo Borrero through the concession of these services to the private sector. He also adopted proposals from Social Christian leader Jaime Nebot like the implementation of 40,000 free internet points throughout the country, public telemedicine application and proposed 400,000 poor families in the country receive a free computer, in addition to focusing on public policies on promotion and training in technology and use of networks for study. He wants to reform and reduce taxation and provide credit for the agriculture sector. He has also said that he will not disavow the agreement with the IMF and respect the debt restructuring agreed to by the previous presidency, but will not raise the VAT tax. Days before the first round, Lasso proposed increasing the unified basic salary to $500.

Lasso is a staunch opponent of abortion in all cases and believes in support for human life from conception to death.

=== Yaku Pérez Guartambel ===
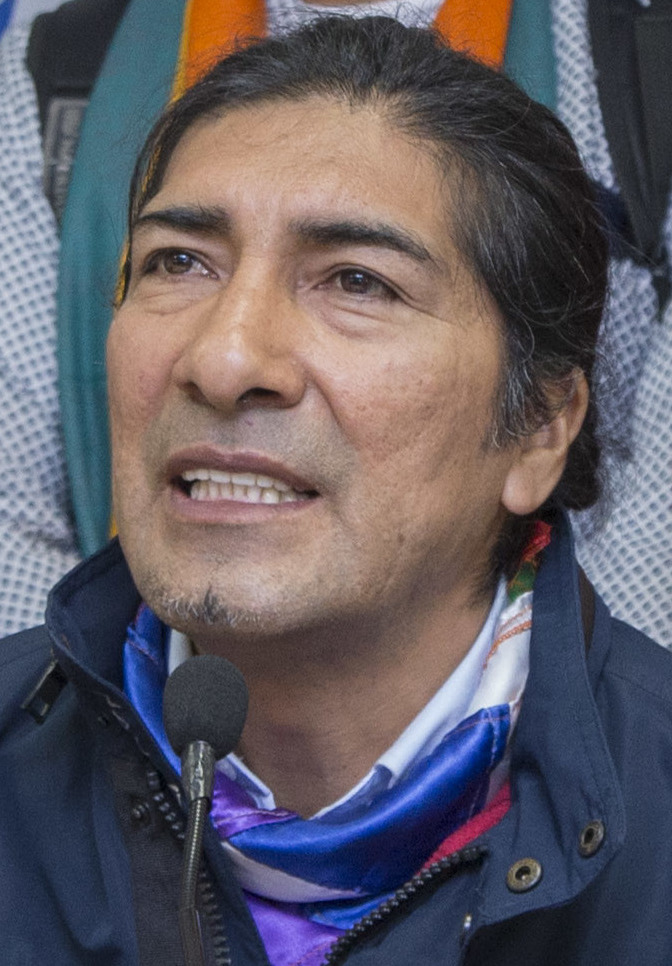
Yaku Pérez Guartambel

Indigenous activist and former prefect of Azuay Province, Yaku Pérez Guartambel is the candidate for the Pachakutik Plurinational Unity Movement – New Country (MUPP). Molecular biologist Virna Cedeño Escobar decided to accept the offer to be the party's candidate for vice president after first being reluctant. Pérez states that he is from "the ecological left that defends the rights of people and nature and understands indigenous communities", and positions himself as giving voters an alternative to the "authoritarian and corrupt left" of former president Correa. Pérez has proposed a ban on all mining activity and to limit oil extraction, and has been critical of China's policies around extractivism and human rights. He has promised to review the agreements with the IMF, and to not pay any "illegitimate debt", refusing to meet with IMF officials when they visited the country in Sep. In an interview, he has expressed openness to a trade deal with the United States under the right conditions. He has expressed support for allowing abortion in cases of rape or when there are serious risk to the health of the mother or fetus, suggesting a referendum on the issue. His economic plan included universal basic income.

=== Others ===
Other presidential candidates included the following:

- On 22 August, anti-abortion activist Martha Cecilia Villafuerte announced her candidacy as vice-president alongside presidential candidate Gerson Almeida, on the Ecuatoriano Unido ticket.
- Pedro José Freile was the candidate from the AMIGO Movement party, with vice president Byron Solís Figueroa, who accepted his nomination on 24 August.
- Isidro Romero announced his run as the Avanza party candidate in Sep.
- On 8 Oct, María Sara Jijón announced her candidacy as vice president, on the Izquierda Democrática ticket, with the independent presidential candidate, businessman and engineer Xavier Hervas Mora.
- On 16 Oct, Carlos Sagnay de la Bastida became the candidate for Partido Fuerza Ec.
- Lucio Gutiérrez Borbúa, the former president of Ecuador, was the candidate from the Sociedad Patriótica party.
- Alianza Honestidad, the coalition of the Partido Socialista Ecuatoriano and Concertación parties, nominated César Montúfar Mancheno, with vice presidential nominee Julio Villacreses Guillém.
- The Unión Ecuatoriana candidate was Giovanny Andrade Salvador, whose running mate was Katherine Mata.
- Democracia Sí announced Gustavo Larrea Cabrera as its presidential candidate, with Alexandra Peralta Marín as vice-presidential candidate.
- SUMA's candidate was Guillermo Celi Santos, with Verónica Sevilla Ledergerber as his running mate.
- Movimiento Construye's candidate was Juan Fernando Velasco Torres, with Ana María Pesántes Salazar as his running mate.
- Juntos Podemos nominated Paúl Carrasco Carpio, with vice presidential nominee Frank Vargas Anda.
- The party of incumbent president Moreno, Alianza PAIS, nominated Ximena Peña Pacheco, with Patricio Barriga Jaramillo as her running mate.

== Endorsements ==
After the confirmation from the electoral commission that the second round would be between Arauz and Lasso, both the Pachakutik movement and CONAIE announced they would promote a null vote in the second round, stating that they did not feel represented by either Lasso or Arauz. Meanwhile, Pérez' running mate Virna Cedeño stated that she would vote for Lasso.

President of CONAIE Jaime Vargas later came out in support of Arauz in the second round during an event with Arauz.

Fourth-place finisher Hervas announced he would support a vote for Lasso in the second round, stating that he did not want to support "the authoritarian model that ruled us" and that Lasso had incorporated some of his issues into his policy proposals. The party backing his run, ID, ruled out supporting either candidate.

Arauz also received support from first-round candidates Ximena Peña of the PAIS Alliance and Isidro Romero, but not from Avanza movement itself who were backing Romero's campaign which did not endorse anyone.

Lasso received the backing from first-round candidates Pedro Freile of the Amigo movement, Lucio Gutiérrez of Sociedad Patriótica, César Montúfar of Alianza Honestidad, Gustavo Larrea of Democracia Sí, Guillermo Celi of SUMA and Paúl Carrasco of Juntos Podemos.

== Opinion polls ==
=== First round ===
Polling firm	Fieldwork date	Sample size	Andrés Arauz	Guillermo Lasso	Yaku Pérez	César Montúfar	Isidro Romero	Lucio Gutiérrez	Xavier Hervas	Ximena Peña	Gustavo Larrea	Juan Fernando Velasco	Guillermo Celi	Pedro José Freile	Gerson Almeida	Carlos Sagnay	Paul Carrasco	Giovanny Andrade	None/ Don't Know	Others	Lead
Polling firm	Fieldwork date	Sample size	UNES	CREO-PSC	MUPP	HONESTIDAD	Avanza	PSP	ID	PAIS	MDS	MC25	SUMA	AMIGO	MEU	FE (Note: until 1 February 2020)	MNJP	UE (Note: until Dec 2020)	None/ Don't Know	Others	Lead
Market	28 Jan 2021	1,520	31.53	21.34	11.91	0.58	2.20	1.27	3.92	1.54	0.11	0.89	1.10	0.86	0.53	0.07	0.53	0.15	22.08	–	10.19
Informe Confidencial	26 Jan 2021	1,600	22.0	17.0	11.0	–	1.0	1.0	4.0	–	–	1.0	–	–	–	–	–	–	37.0	6	5.0
Eureknow	26 Jan 2021	1,400	22.4	18.6	10.2	4.2	4.6	3.0	8.1	0.8	1.1	2.4	3.5	4.5	2.2	1.1	–	0.9	12.3	0.1	3.8
CEDATOS	25 Jan 2021	10,500	21.9	21.2	14.5	–	–	–	–	–	–	–	–	–	–	–	–	–	26.1	16.3	0.7
La Historia	24 Jan 2021	2,990	30.0	21.9	13.4	1.7	3.4	2.1	1.6	1.3	0.5	1.0	–	0.9	1.0	0.1	0.4	0.3	18.5	1.9	8.1
Atlas Intel	22 Jan 2021	3.202	36.0	25.5	9.4	0.9	2.3	2.2	4.1	1.2	0.3	1.1	–	2.0	0.8	0.4	0.4	0.2	4.8	8.4	10.5
Atlas Intel	22 Jan 2021	3.202	36.5	26.7	10.8	1.5	1.5	2.4	4.5	1.5	0.2	1.1	1.5	2.0	1.0	0.3	0.4	0.1	5.2	2.8	9.8
Omar Maluk	21 Jan 2021	17.636	25.1	13.9	9.2	1.3	3.9	2.7	0.9	1.1	1.2	0.7	1.4	0.4	0.9	0.5	0.4	0.4	28.9	7.1	11.2
Comunicaliza	20 Jan 2021	2,057	37.4	18.5	19.2	1.4	2.4	3.8	4.5	1.3	0.3	1.1	2.7	1.3	1.3	0.5	0.0	0.2	–	4.1	18.2
Clima Social	18 Jan 2021	11,537	30.1	21.5	17.2	0.9	3.0	3.3	2.3	1.8	1.2	1.1	1.3	0.5	0.7	0.8	0.3	0.3	5.2	8.5	8.6
Market	10 Jan 2021	1,520	37.61	30.88	13.85	1.08	0.62	1.10	0.89	–	–	–	0.33	–	–	–	–	–	12.06	1.58	6.73
Pulso Ciudadano	9 Jan 2021	1,500	26.73	20.85	11.63	1.20	1.13	1.41	1.70	0.42	0.14	0.63	0.21	0.21	0.42	0.42	0.14	0.36	32.40	–	5.8
Atlas Intel	31 Dec 2020	3,175	34.4	26.7	8.2	1.0	0.8	0.9	3.1	1.6	0.4	0.1	0.3	0.0	0.2	0.3	0.0	0.0	10.5	11.5	7.7
ESTRATEGIA Consultores	29 Dec 2020	1,400	22.3	20.2	17.4	2.7	4.3	2.1	–	–	2.5	1.2	–	–	–	–	–	–	18.4	8.9	2.1
Perfiles de Opinión	27 Dec 2020	4,579	25.75	15.22	11.84	–	–	1.47	–	1.72	–	–	–	–	–	–	–	–	–	44.00	10.53
Eureknow	23 Dec 2020	1,400	20.8	20.0	9.1	4.1	4.4	–	–	–	–	3.2	–	–	–	–	–	–	8.2	30.2	0.8
Clima Social	20 Dec 2020	3,500	23.3	13.9	12.8	1.3	2.4	2.6	1.9	3.0	1.2	1.2	0.7	0.6	1.0	1.3	0.3	0.1	13.1	19.3	9.4
CELAG	13 Dec 2020	3,000	36.5	13.6	21.2	–	1.4	1.0	–	1.2	1.0	–	–	–	–	–	–	–	–	24.1	15.3
Informe Confidencial	26 Nov 2020	1,560	22.0	17.0	13.0	–	–	–	–	–	–	–	–	–	–	–	–	–	42.0	6.0	5.0
MKT Consulting Corp.	17 Nov 2020	3,298	16.10	23.68	18.47	–	5.49	–	–	–	–	–	–	–	–	–	–	–	16.25	20.01	5.21
Clima Social	15 Nov 2020	2,579	23.0	20.0	12.9	0.8	2.4	3.9	0.2	2.6	1.7	1.0	0.7	<1.0	0.3	0.5	–	0.6	14.7	14.7	3.0
CEDATOS	15 Nov 2020	1,670	11.1	18.1	6.2	0.4	0.5	0.3	–	0.2	0.1	0.1	0.2	–	0.1	–	–	–	11.3	51.4	7.0
CEDATOS	15 Nov 2020	1,800	13.0	23.0	10.7	0.9	1.3	0.9	0.1	0.4	0.3	1.5	0.8	0.1	0.4	0.1	0.6	0.2	36.6	9.1	10.0
Omar Maluk	27 Oct 2020	6,435	30.8	23.8	8.8	2.8	2.4	2.2	–	0.8	2.2	–	1.1	–	0.5	–	–	–	–	24.6	7.0
Omar Maluk	27 Oct 2020	6,435	40.1	30.9	11.5	3.6	3.1	2.8		1.0	2.9	–	1.5	–	0.6	–	–	–	–	2.0	9.2
CEDATOS	17 Oct 2020	1,800	19.7	26.1	13.1	1.0	0.7	1.4	0.3	0.5	0.5	1.3	1.0	0.1	0.1	0.1	0.1	0.1	33.9	–	6.4
CEDATOS	8 Oct 2020	1,670	12.2	15.0	4.7	1.3	0.1	0.8	–	0.8	0.5	0.5	–	–	–	–	0.3	–	11.3	52.5	2.8
Clima Social	8 Oct 2020	2,017	18.6	21.5	10.7	1.7	1.7	3.0	0.4	4.6	3.9	1.7	1.8	–	–	–	–	–	14.1	16.3	2.9
ESTRATEGIA Consultores	1 Oct 2020	1,400	19.6	20.3	16.8	4.1	3.4	2.0	–	–	–	1.5	–	–	–	–	–	–	–	32.3	0.7
Pulso Ciudadano	28 Sep 2020	1,400	21.05	19.12	6.17	6.02	4.32	1.88	1.39	1.8	4.06	–	0.97	1.18	1.25	–	0.34	–	–	30.45	1.93
Informe Confidencial	27 Sep 2020	1,000	16.0	17.0	12.0	1.5	2.0	–	0.5	–	1.0	1.0	1.0	–	–	–	–	–	11.0	37	1.0
MKT Consulting Corp.	18 Sep 2020	8,400	21.0	26.0	9.0	–	–	–	–	–	4.0	–	–	–	–	–	–	–	–	40.0	5.0
Atlas Intel	18 Sep 2020	3,772	45.9	32.0	4.3	1.1	0.9	0.3	0.4	0.2	0.3	0.2	0.9	0.2	0.2	–	0.4	–	6.1	6.6	13.9
SERVIDATOS	14 Sep 2020	4,800	16.72	18.67	16.23	11.98	–	–	–	–	–	–	–	–	–	–	–	–	32.29	4.11	1.95
CEDATOS	14 Sep 2020	2,100	12.3	16.3	5.5	0.6	0.5	0.7	0.1	0.8	0.0	0.5	0.5	–	0.3	–	–	–	27.8	34.1	4.0
Eureknow	10 Sep 2020	750	22.0	23.1	20.5	9.9	6.6	–	–	–	–	–	–	–	–	–	–	–	7.2	10.7	1.1

=== Second round ===
Polling firm	Fieldwork date	Sample size	Andrés Arauz	Guillermo Lasso	None	Blank/ Don't Know
Polling firm	Fieldwork date	Sample size	UNES	CREO-PSC	None	Blank/ Don't Know
Omar Maluk	1 Apr 2021	12,104	53.8	46.2	–	–
Omar Maluk	1 Apr 2021	12,104	33.3	28.7	22.2	15.9
Atlas Intel	1 Apr 2021	2,191	50.9	49.1	–	–
Atlas Intel	1 Apr 2021	2,191	40.8	39.4	19.8	
Eureknow	31 Mar 2021	1,400	50.1	49.9	–	–
Eureknow	31 Mar 2021	1,400	39.6	37.0	11.5	11.9
CEDATOS	31 Mar 2021	2,782	48.0	52.0	–	–
CEDATOS	31 Mar 2021	2,782	35.2	38.2	23.09	
Comunicaliza	30 Mar 2021	5,233	49.1	50.9	–	–
Comunicaliza	30 Mar 2021	5,233	32.7	33.9	16.2	
Click Report	29 Mar 2021	750	48.51	51.49	–	–
Click Report	29 Mar 2021	750	37.71	40.03	14.18	8.08
Estrategia Consultores	28 Mar 2021	1,448	51.7	48.3	–	–
Estrategia Consultores	28 Mar 2021	1,448	43.5	40.7	13.5	
Pulso Ciudadano	25 Mar 2021	1,975	39.3	36.7	10.1	13.9
Perfiles de Opinión	24 Mar 2021	4,056	37.87	30.19	25.01	6.93
Clima Social	23 Mar 2021	3,738	55.7	44.3	–	–
Clima Social	23 Mar 2021	3,738	34.1	27.1	19.8	2.4
Omar Maluk	21 Mar 2021	1,400	58.7	41.3	–	–
Omar Maluk	21 Mar 2021	1,400	36.9	26.0	21.6	3.8
Click Report	15 Mar 2021	750	37.11	37.37	13.29	
Eureknow	13 Mar 2021	1,400	53.7	46.3	–	–
Eureknow	13 Mar 2021	1,400	48.0	41.5	10.5	–
Perfiles de Opinión	24 Feb 2021	4,056	43.15	23.75	25.74	7.37

== Results ==
=== President ===
Preliminary results indicated that Andrés Arauz had a significant lead, but his vote total did not reach the 40% required to avoid a runoff, where he will face off against the second-place candidate. While early results had Yaku Pérez narrowly ahead of Lasso in second place, he eventually slipped to third place by about twenty thousand votes, prompting him to request a recount. The final results remained pending for a week due to Pérez's requested recount of 100% of the votes in Guayas Province and 50% of the votes in 16 other provinces, which was also agreed to by Lasso. Lasso later retracted his support for the recount. Later, fourth-place finisher Xavier Hervas also called for a total recount of the presidential votes.

In a press conference together with indigenous leaders on 17 February, Pérez stated that he would not support Lasso in the near future. Pérez insisted that fraud had been committed, especially in the provinces of Guayas, Manabí and Los Ríos. Pérez also claimed that the electoral authorities had colluded with other political actors. The leader of Pachakutik, Marlon Santi, also warned that if the recount request was not granted, indigenous bases would be mobilized. On 18 February, a group of indigenous people started Maring from Saraguro towards Quito. The group, including Yaku Pérez, arrived in the capital 23 February, delivering a large number of documents that they claimed indicated irregularities in the National Electoral Council (CNE in Spanish).

On 19 February, the CNE confirmed Lasso as Arauz's opponent in the second round scheduled for 11 April.

The second round took place on 11 April. Shortly after 21:00 local time and after the polls closed at 17:00, with 97% of the votes counted, Guillermo Lasso was proclaimed the winner of the elections with 52.21% of the votes obtained and winning in 17 of the 24 provinces. Arauz acknowledged the defeat and said he would call the winner Lasso the following day to do so personally and show him that "[his] democratic convictions of being able to continue contributing to the development of the country when it is about benefiting the majority of our people and to oppose constructively and responsibly when it seeks to simply attend to privileges."

Candidate	Running mate	Party	First round		Second round	
Candidate	Running mate	Party	Votes	%	Votes	%
Andrés Arauz	Carlos Rabascall	Union for Hope (CD–FCS)	3,033,791	32.72	4,236,515	47.64
Guillermo Lasso	Alfredo Borrero Vega	CREO Movement–Social Christian Party	1,830,172	19.74	4,656,426	52.36
Yaku Pérez	Virna Cedeño	Pachakutik	1,798,057	19.39		
Xavier Hervas	María Sara Jijón	Democratic Left	1,453,915	15.68		
Pedro José Freile	Byron Solís	AMIGO Movement	192,763	2.08		
Isidro Romero	Sofía Merino	Avanza	172,714	1.86		
Lucio Gutiérrez	David Norero	Patriotic Society Party	164,800	1.78		
Gerson Almeida	Martha Villafuerte	United Ecuadorian	160,572	1.73		
Ximena Peña	Patricio Barriga	PAIS Alliance	143,160	1.54		
Guillermo Celi	Verónica Sevilla	SUMA Party	84,640	0.91		
Juan Fernando Velasco	Ana María Pesantes	Build Movement	76,349	0.82		
César Montúfar	Julio Villacreses	Honesty Alliance (MC–PSE)	57,620	0.62		
Gustavo Larrea	Alexandra Peralta	Democracy Yes	36,903	0.40		
Carlos Sagnay	Narda Ortiz	Fuerza Ecuador	26,524	0.29		
Giovanny Andrade	Katherine Mata	Ecuadorian Union Movement	20,245	0.22		
Paúl Carrasco	Frank Vargas Anda	Together We Can National Movement	19,809	0.21		
Total			9,272,034	100.00	8,892,941	100.00
Valid votes			9,272,034	87.35	8,892,941	82.13
Invalid/blank votes			1,342,840	12.65	1,935,445	17.87
Total votes			10,614,874	100.00	10,828,386	100.00
Registered voters/turnout			13,099,150	81.03	12,843,192	84.31
Source: CNE, CNE

==== First round by province ====
Province	Arauz	Lasso	Pérez	Hervas	Freile	Romero	Gutiérrez	Almeida	Peña	Celi	Velasco	Montúfar	Larrea	Sagnay	Andrade	Carrasco
Province	%	%	%	%	%	%	%	%	%	%	%	%	%	%	%	%
Azuay	21.01	14.14	42.14	15.07	2.51	0.55	0.59	0.88	1.00	0.27	0.39	0.47	0.23	0.13	0.16	0.49
Bolívar	14.00	13.73	47.92	12.51	1.22	0.92	4.58	0.87	0.81	0.90	0.45	0.61	0.43	0.23	0.64	0.18
Cañar	23.23	12.02	44.05	13.41	1.36	0.55	1.25	0.77	0.94	0.28	0.36	0.50	0.67	0.14	0.33	0.14
Carchi	20.42	16.71	20.67	28.22	6.66	0.87	1.50	0.41	1.99	0.33	0.90	0.48	0.34	0.17	0.16	0.18
Chimborazo	16.90	14.95	41.55	15.74	2.17	0.98	2.30	1.18	1.10	0.47	0.55	0.90	0.34	0.29	0.29	0.28
Cotopaxi	18.58	11.25	43.75	14.98	2.70	0.78	2.55	0.82	1.17	0.69	0.73	0.73	0.51	0.21	0.28	0.28
El Oro	36.83	17.73	14.42	20.79	0.94	2.82	0.83	1.78	1.56	0.37	0.60	0.37	0.34	0.28	0.20	0.15
Esmeraldas	44.27	20.84	12.34	9.12	0.71	1.35	1.19	2.70	2.38	0.75	1.01	0.58	1.67	0.53	0.33	0.25
Galápagos	24.09	33.71	16.27	15.31	1.83	1.66	0.73	2.06	0.76	1.49	0.64	0.55	0.10	0.06	0.51	0.21
Guayas	41.82	25.27	8.73	9.94	0.97	3.08	2.00	3.19	1.69	0.70	1.04	0.42	0.37	0.38	0.22	0.18
Imbabura	29.38	17.16	22.39	18.54	4.87	0.94	1.26	0.63	1.53	0.39	0.98	0.87	0.37	0.26	0.22	0.20
Loja	19.04	17.24	30.48	26.33	1.25	0.69	1.33	0.80	0.74	0.38	0.35	0.55	0.24	0.21	0.18	0.19
Los Ríos	46.83	15.24	12.07	9.04	0.68	4.97	3.03	1.99	2.96	0.66	0.63	0.43	0.50	0.50	0.29	0.18
Manabí	52.22	14.74	6.05	12.57	0.70	1.88	1.12	1.24	2.44	4.41	0.94	0.40	0.45	0.37	0.25	0.23
Morona Santiago	16.32	9.61	52.00	15.30	0.59	0.24	2.32	0.50	0.64	0.94	0.46	0.47	0.23	0.12	0.16	0.10
Napo	13.59	17.18	43.90	12.86	0.97	0.46	8.00	0.65	0.45	0.46	0.41	0.53	0.19	0.11	0.12	0.12
Orellana	25.83	12.04	34.02	15.05	1.02	2.40	5.01	1.05	1.21	0.27	0.60	0.62	0.32	0.19	0.16	0.20
Pastaza	14.38	17.33	40.68	17.78	1.40	0.55	3.61	0.94	0.76	0.81	0.46	0.50	0.30	0.09	0.23	0.18
Pichincha	22.53	25.86	16.71	23.25	4.60	0.89	1.24	0.91	0.87	0.36	0.82	1.14	0.30	0.15	0.16	0.19
Santa Elena	42.77	13.96	14.86	12.36	1.11	2.37	0.75	4.82	3.10	0.62	1.48	0.43	0.45	0.42	0.29	0.24
Santo Domingo de los Tsáchilas	35.93	17.38	16.20	17.93	1.74	1.67	1.75	1.18	2.50	0.82	1.07	0.59	0.56	0.27	0.22	0.21
Sucumbíos	34.92	8.23	37.01	11.76	0.88	0.74	2.95	0.56	1.05	0.39	0.52	0.37	0.17	0.14	0.17	0.15
Tungurahua	12.06	18.40	32.28	23.53	3.99	1.03	3.03	1.53	0.86	0.71	0.92	0.72	0.26	0.23	0.21	0.24
Zamora Chinchipe	16.88	12.53	40.03	24.80	0.64	0.39	1.13	0.80	0.60	0.36	0.31	0.59	0.26	0.28	0.15	0.26
Europe, Asia & Oceania	47.97	12.06	18.32	10.09	1.89	2.59	0.90	1.74	1.42	0.58	0.54	0.69	0.28	0.42	0.29	0.24
Latin America & Africa	35.41	36.18	10.03	6.33	1.40	2.20	0.79	1.50	1.39	0.71	0.80	1.44	0.97	0.33	0.34	0.18
USA & Canada	36.09	27.23	24.05	5.93	1.06	0.96	0.65	0.71	1.03	0.69	0.31	0.51	0.32	0.20	0.09	0.16
Total	32.72	19.74	19.38	15.68	2.08	1.86	1.78	1.73	1.54	0.91	0.82	0.62	0.40	0.29	0.22	0.21
Sources: CNE

==== Second round by province ====
Province	Arauz	Lasso
Province	%	%
Azuay	43.84	56.16
Bolívar	30.57	69.43
Cañar	48.11	51.89
Carchi	36.39	63.61
Chimborazo	34.09	65.91
Cotopaxi	36.80	63.20
El Oro	51.64	48.36
Esmeraldas	55.75	44.25
Galápagos	34.66	65.34
Guayas	53.05	46.95
Imbabura	45.57	54.43
Loja	32.46	67.54
Los Ríos	62.35	37.65
Manabí	66.10	33.90
Morona Santiago	30.79	69.21
Napo	25.01	74.99
Orellana	44.50	55.50
Pastaza	26.63	73.37
Pichincha	35.35	64.65
Santa Elena	61.10	38.90
Santo Domingo de los Tsáchilas	49.19	50.81
Sucumbíos	56.31	43.69
Tungurahua	24.59	75.41
Zamora Chinchipe	30.73	69.27
Europe, Asia & Oceania	63.59	36.41
Latin America, Caribe & Africa	46.65	53.35
USA & Canada	46.73	53.27
Total	47.64	52.36
Sources: CNE

=== National Assembly ===
Party	National			Provincial			Overseas			Total seats	+/–
Party	Votes	%	Seats	Votes	%	Seats	Votes	%	Seats	Total seats	+/–
Union for Hope	2,584,595	32.21	5	2,432,925	30.37	40	43,421	43.76	4	49	New
Pachakutik Plurinational Unity Movement – New Country	1,348,679	16.81	3	1,140,257	14.24	23	14,515	14.63	1	27	+23
Democratic Left	961,513	11.98	2	846,745	10.57	16	9,452	9.53	0	18	+14
Social Christian Party	780,541	9.73	2	932,622	11.64	16	9,031	9.10	0	18	+3
Creating Opportunities	774,238	9.65	2	736,889	9.20	9	8,884	8.95	1	12	–22
Honesty Alliance (MC–PSE)	301,369	3.76	1	155,979	1.95	1	1,949	1.96	0	2	New
PAIS Alliance	222,092	2.77	0	181,408	2.26	0	2,423	2.44	0	0	–74
United Ecuadorian	166,888	2.08	0	193,840	2.42	2	1,407	1.42	0	2	New
Avanza	154,529	1.93	0	202,149	2.52	2	2,223	2.24	0	2	+2
Patriotic Society Party	145,398	1.81	0	157,424	1.97	1				1	–1
Popular Unity	139,969	1.74	0	163,103	2.04	0	1,512	1.52	0	0	0
SUMA Party	135,038	1.68	0	177,280	2.21	0	1,164	1.17	0	0	New
Democracy Yes	84,209	1.05	0	155,307	1.94	1	1,267	1.28	0	1	New
Fuerza Ecuador	70,854	0.88	0	27,645	0.35	0				0	–1
Ecuadorian Union	59,080	0.74	0	110,920	1.38	1	568	0.57	0	1	+1
Build Movement	57,711	0.72	0			1	693	0.70	0	1	+1
Together We Can National Movement	37,438	0.47	0	48,585	0.61	0	705	0.71	0	0	New
Social Justice Movement				25,970	0.32	0				0	New
Provincial movements (AP/Minga/AC)				321,037	4.01	3				3	0
Total	8,024,141	100.00	15	8,010,085	100.00	116	99,214	100.00	6	137	0
Valid votes	8,024,141	75.59		8,010,085	77.43		99,214	82.75			
Invalid/blank votes	2,591,041	24.41		2,335,229	22.57		20,679	17.25			
Total votes	10,615,182	100.00		10,345,314	100.00		119,893	100.00			
Registered voters/turnout	13,107,364	80.99		12,661,372	81.71		410,146	29.23			
Source: Mercosur Parliament, CNE

=== Andean Parliament ===
On 7 February 2021, Ecuadorian voters also elected five members of the Andean Parliament. Two of the successful candidates were current National Assembly members: Verónica Arias (CD) and Cristina Reyes (PSC).

Party	Votes	%	Seats
Union for Hope	2,588,499	32.96	2
Pachakutik	1,294,227	16.48	1
Democratic Left	1,001,581	12.75	1
Social Christian Party	962,474	12.26	1
CREO Movement	673,995	8.58	0
PAIS Alliance	238,237	3.03	0
United Ecuadorian Movement	172,590	2.20	0
Patriotic Society Party	157,956	2.01	0
Avanza	157,306	2.00	0
SUMA Party	148,508	1.89	0
Popular Unity	147,464	1.88	0
Honesty Alliance (MC–PSE)	114,310	1.46	0
Democracy Yes	99,986	1.27	0
Ecuadorian Union Movement	56,949	0.73	0
Together We Can National Movement	38,800	0.49	0
Total	7,852,882	100.00	5
Valid votes	7,852,882	74.78	
Invalid/blank votes	2,648,669	25.22	
Total votes	10,501,551	100.00	
Registered voters/turnout	13,099,150	80.17	
Source: CNE

=== Cuenca mining referendum ===
In the referendum held in Cuenca, preliminary results showed 80.9% of voters voting in favor of prohibiting mining activity in the area.
