= Sexuality in South America =

Sexuality in South America varies by region and time period. Before the arrival of Europeans in South America, the different Indigenous people living there had multiple types of sexualities: there was not a single norm, but several practices that were part of a more diverse sexuality than in the West. Homosexual practices were common, and sexuality, far from being a taboo, was represented in art and everyday objects (such as the Moches vases). The arrival of Europeans changed South American sexual practices and gender expressions, forcing them to adhere to the classical heteronormative model.

It was only with the global acceptance of diverse sexualities (in connection with the emancipation and visibility of the LGBT cause) that the European norm imposed during colonization could be challenged again by sexualities based on models other than heteronormativity and marital exclusivity.

== Pre-colonial history ==
Before the arrival of the colonists in South America in the 15th century, the sexualities of indigenous peoples were much more varied than the heteronormative Christian norm. And before the European invasion, sexuality was a vital element that was neither associated with sin, nor regulated, nor criminalised.

According to Manuela L. Picq and Josi Tikuna, “Sexual diversity has historically been the norm, not the exception, among Indigenous peoples”. For example, in the Amazon and Himalayan regions, non-monogamy is the norm.

Much of the evidence and sources of knowledge on the subject of sexuality in ancient South America and its various regions comes from sources such as ceramics, “human skeletal remains, representational imagery, the organization of space, and ethnohistoric documents”.

=== Ceramics ===
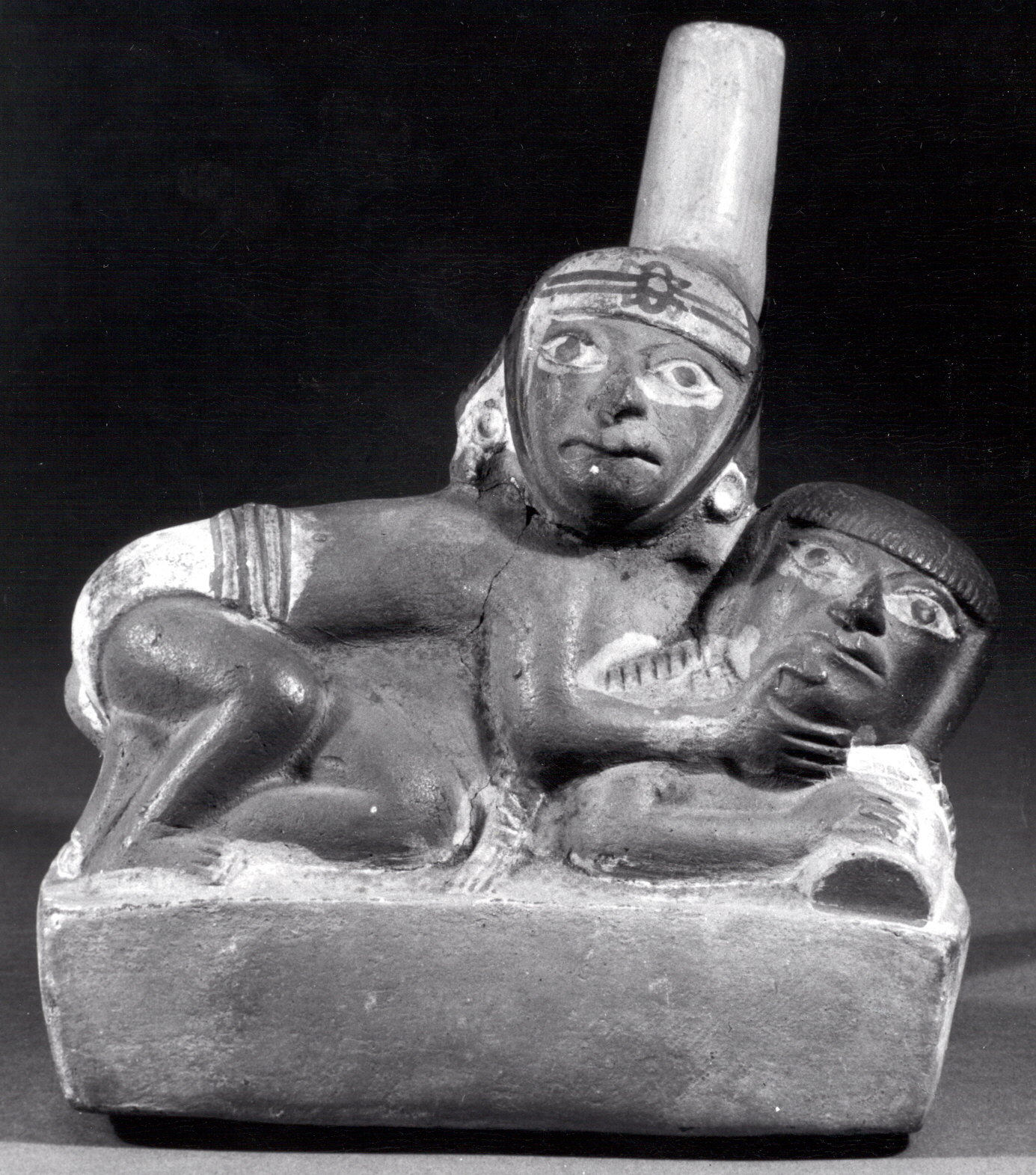
Moche ceramic depicting a sexual act between two people. Stirrup Spout bottle created around 2nd–5th century. This image was donated to Wikimedia Commons as part of a project by the Metropolitan Museum of Art.

Since sexuality was not seen as taboo or different from other social activities, it was often represented in art, as is the case with the famous Moches ceramics (AD 15-800), which celebrates sexuality as a life force.

These ceramics frequently depict various sex acts, many portraying acts of sodomy and fellatio and far more infrequently, vaginal intercourse.

Where there artifacts are largely without context, stripped of archaeological data, and absent any written records, their significance and purpose are frequently left up to interpretation.

=== Reproduction ===
Several South American tribes had a unique and different understanding of reproduction: for example, certain South American indigenous groups believed in the notion of “partible paternity”. This consists in the belief that multiple men can help contribute to the development of a fetus. More prevalent in the lowlands of South America, this deeply historically-rooted notion, sometimes “accompanied by ritualized sequential sex” could help to formalize male alliances as well as minimize the risk of death or abuse of the infant.

=== Same-sex practices ===
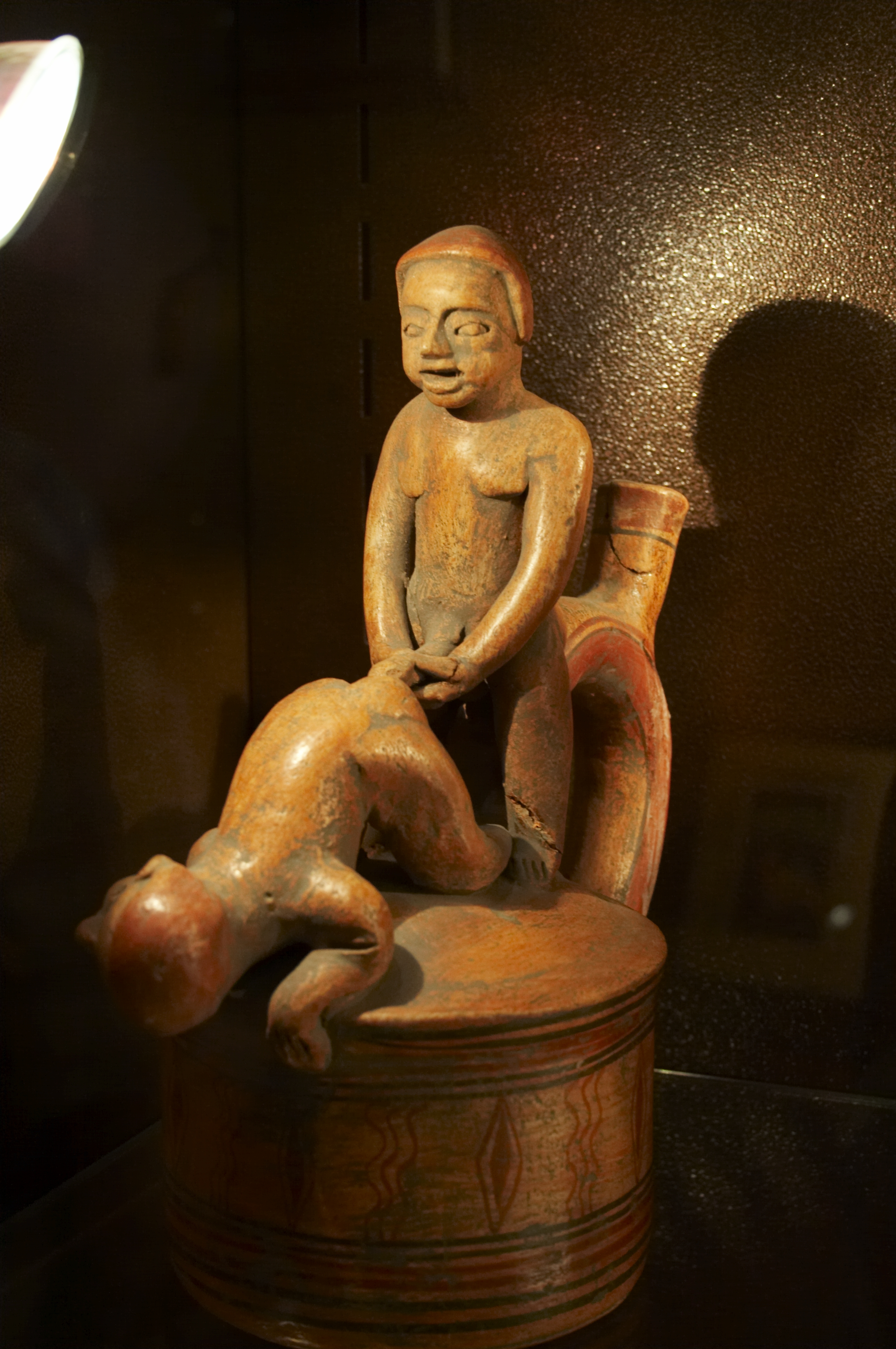
The Moches vases unashamedly depict acts of sodomy in the same way as any other scene from everyday life. Stirrup Spout bottle created around 2nd–5th century. This file was donated to Wikipedia Commons as part of a project by the Musée de l'érotisme.

After the arrival of the colonists in South America, the goal of conversion to Christianity was manifested in sexual practices: indeed, for many of the original peoples, homosexuality was not a taboo at all. However, the Church considered that the body should only be used for reproductive purposes. Same-sex practices were then prohibited and punished.

The researcher Patricia Carvalho Rosa explains the exclusion of homosexuals who did not submit to heterosexual norms in the post-colonial period in indigenous Tikuna communities in Brazil.

Until the insertion of the moral canons imposed by Christianity, the category of "morbidity" was not used to qualify non-heterosexual relations.

Since the Christian Church was totally opposed to homosexual practices, it did not hesitate to impose severe punishments on those continuing such practices. Christian missionaries sent to South America were violent towards the 'sodomites' they encountered in the indigenous communities. The chronicler Pietro Martire (1513) tells us that in the Isthmus of Panama, the Europeans trapped a group of native homosexuals and punished them by having them eaten by dogs.

Despite the harsh repression of homosexual practices throughout Latin America, the existence of erotic artworks has allowed a whole section of certain cultures to survive, such as the Moches or the Chimu.

=== Gender Identities ===
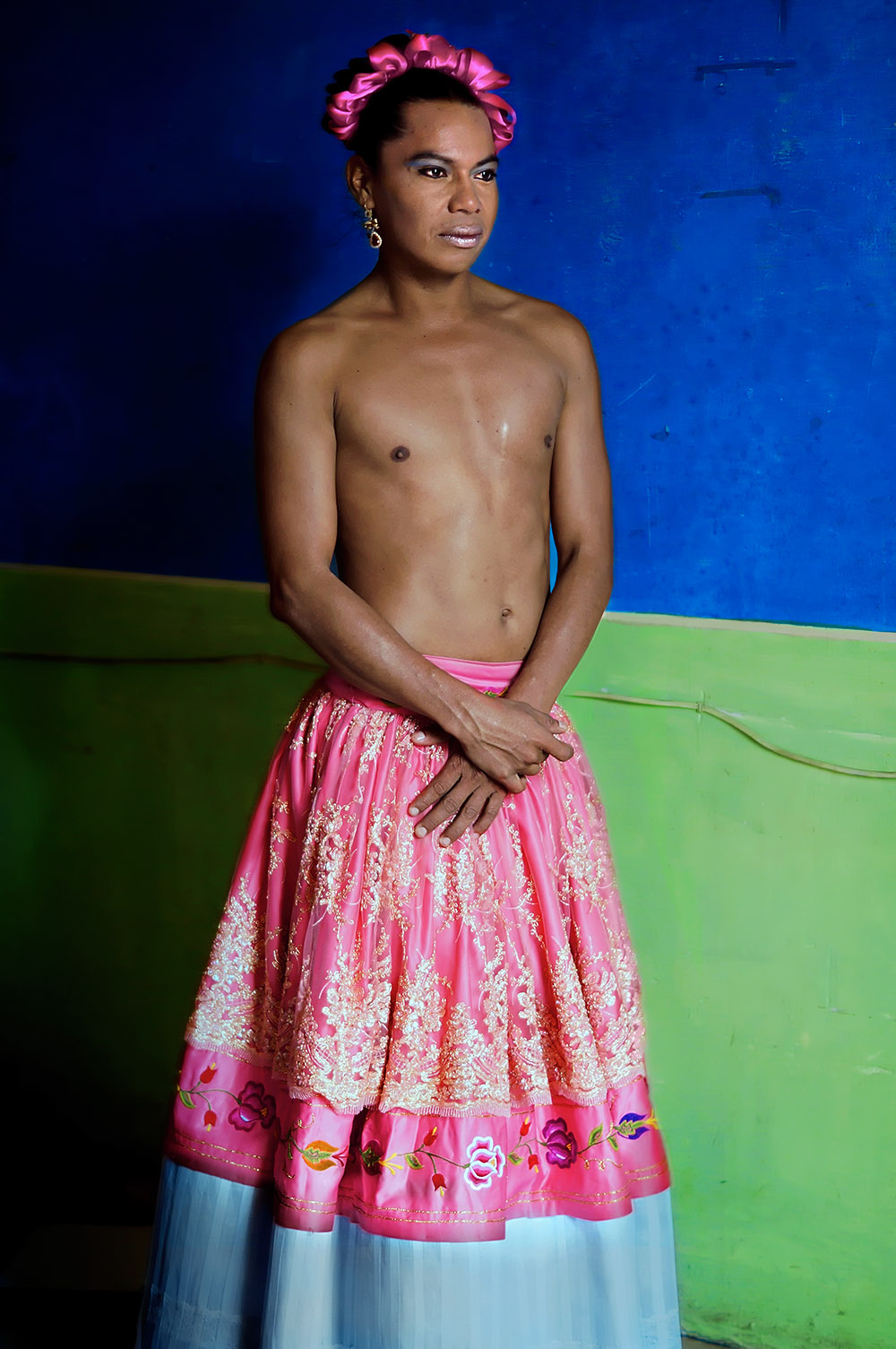
Muxe Lukas Avendano from Tehuantepec, Oaxaca Mexico. Contemporary Performance artist from Mexico, 30 April 2015.

Before the arrival of settlers, the different communities had more than two gender identities, and some identities can be understood with concepts defined by the LGBT community.

For the traditional Guna (Indigenous people of Panama and Colombia), the term “Omeguitt” (like a woman) serves to refer to “homosexual men who are educated by their mothers from a very early age in housework and away from the jobs that are socially assigned to heterosexual men.” Through this process, homosexual men acquire a female sexual and social identity, which in the Western culture is equivalent to a transgender person.

In the Mexican Zapotec culture, similarly, instead of only having two genders (male and female), they have a kind of “third gender” with the muxes (person assigned male at birth who is dressing with habitual female clothes).

== After the Arrival of Europeans ==
When the Spaniards arrived in the sixteenth century, they were horrified by the sexual practices of the natives americans. Viceroy Francisco de Toledo and the priests were dismayed to discover that homosexuality was accepted and that the indigenous population did not prohibit premarital sex or place any particular emphasis on female chastity.

With the arrival of the European settlers, the social and demographic order was considerably shaken. New racial and social categories were born out of the colonial hierarchy, totally disrupting cultures. In the Andes, for example, sexuality became synonymous with fear and sin.

It was impossible for the Europeans to understand the concepts behind what they interpreted as the simple non-reproductive sexuality of the natives. Indeed, the reality that the indigenous people experienced on a daily basis was not transcribed in terms that Europeans were able to understand:

“Las sexualidades indígenas son intraducibles en términos occidentales. No son las palabras las que son intraducibles, sino el tejido social, cultural y político que representan. Las taxonomías desarrolladas por la sociedad colonial no pudieron capturar las prácticas nahuas en el siglo XVI así como los marcos actuales de derechos sexuales no pueden capturar las relaciones tikunas.” (Manuela L. Picq, 2020, p.15)

Translation: “Indigenous sexualities are untranslatable in Western terms. It is not the words that are untranslatable, but the social, cultural and political fabric they represent. The taxonomies developed by colonial society could not capture Nahua practices in the 16th century just as today's sexual rights frameworks cannot capture Tikuna relationships.”

Sexual relations at that time were intrinsically linked to notions of power: thus, any white person is considered superior in every way to an "indigenous" or black person. Children born from the union of white and black people are considered "mestizos". During this period a large number of indigenous women were forced to have sexual relations with European settlers.

According to Irene Silverblatt (2011) sexuality was one of the most important topics for Counter-Reformation Spain, as it worked hand in hand in the colonial enterprise with the traditional family-values Church. The objective was to control every sexual activity in the Andes. To that extent, the catechism, confession manuals and sermons inspired by the Third Council of Lima served as privileged tools to justify a society intolerant to diversity. In Peru around late 16th -17th, sexual relations were strictly regulated through explicit texts.

The ideal was that of chastity, which was to take precedence over impulses that were then seen only as sins. These sexual sins were clearly categorised: “the abominable sin (sodomy), masturbation, homosexual relations and copulation with animals. For their part, licit sexual relations, duly blessed by the holy sacrament of marriage, were explicitly confined to the marriage bed”.

Following colonialism, when certain South American groups were seen to not fit into colonial normative gender roles, they would often be seen as gender deviants. Amazon cannibal women were frequently portrayed this way for not fitting the in feminine and masculine ideals of early modern Europe. More current trans and critical race perspectives interpret these women, rather, as transmasculine figures.

== Today's sexualities ==
To understand the current situations of violence, marginalisation, discrimination and concealment that exist in the indigenous peoples, societies, cultures and member states of Abya Yala regarding non-heterosexual, bisexual, transgender, transsexual and intersex persons, it is necessary to study and have an objective historical perspective of the processes of conquest.

This process has taken place since 1495 throughout the length and breadth of this continent, both by French, English, Portuguese, Spanish and other delegations.

It can be seen that homophobia, biphobia and transphobia have their roots deeply related to machismo and religious fundamentalism that was brought from Europe, English, Portuguese, Spanish and other delegations, that was brought from Europe to these lands and that considered other sexual and gender practices as disgusting, dirty, unnatural and sinful, leaving these ideas rooted in our cultures until today, with the same myths but with different rites.

=== Same-sex practices ===
South America has followed the global trend of normalisation of same-sex practices, homosexuality and legalisation of same-sex marriages.

For more information see the page of LGBT rights in the Americas.

=== Gender identities ===
South American countries that previously had special categories for people who did not identify as male or female in pre-Columbian times (with the Omeguitt and the Muxes) seem to be returning to this model. Indeed, several countries now recognise the existence of non-binary people.

Since 1 March, a decision of the Colombian Supreme Court recognises the right of a citizen to have the word "non-binary" on the national identity card. The decision also obliges the Colombian State to open this possibility to any person who requests it within six months.

Colombia is thus the third South American country to officially allow non-binary identification on a voluntary basis, after Argentina and Uruguay. Chile is another country where this possibility is reserved for intersex people "by birth".

Despite these legal advances, LGBTI+ people in South America still suffer from multiple discriminations, they remain the target of violence (verbal and physical) and experience more precarious living conditions than the rest of the population, this is particularly true for transgender and non-binary people.

=== Reproductive Rights ===
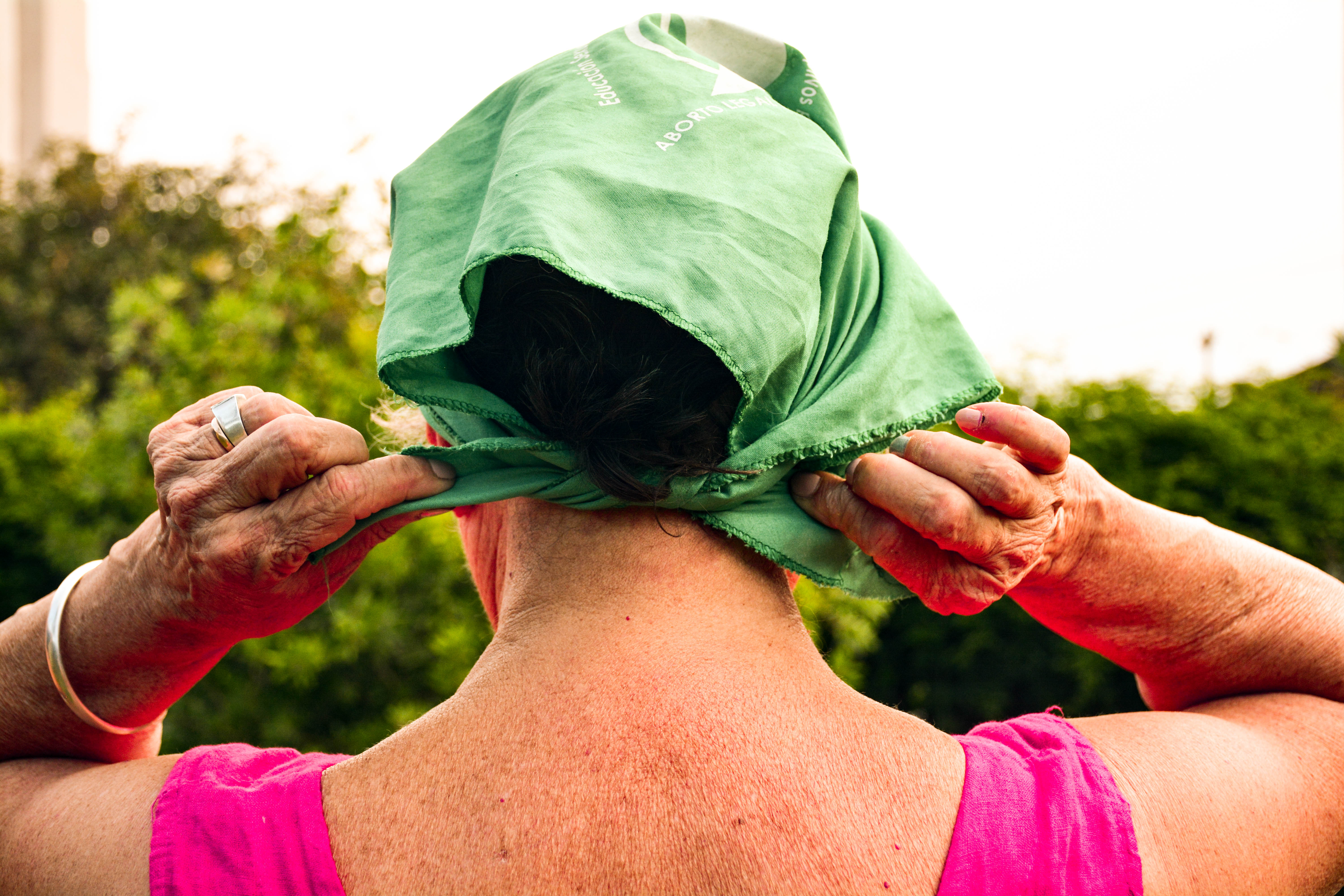
Woman wearing a Green Scarf, symbol for the legalisation of abortion. Río Cuarto, Córdoba. Argentina.

Sexuality and reproductive rights remain major issues in the politics of various South American countries. Indeed, the continent is deeply divided between the traditionalist Catholic religion (South America has the largest number of Catholic believers in the world) and the upheavals of the LGBT+ and feminist movements calling for more freedoms and rights.

Tensions arise in particular around the issue of reproductive rights, access to contraception and the right to abortion.

In March 2021, thousands of demonstrators took to the streets of their cities in Peru, El Salvador, Ecuador, Chile and Colombia to demand the legalisation of voluntary termination of pregnancy. The symbol of this struggle has become the Green scarf.

For more informations, see the page on Reproductive rights in Latin America.
