= Yaku Pérez Guartambel =

Ecuadorian politician

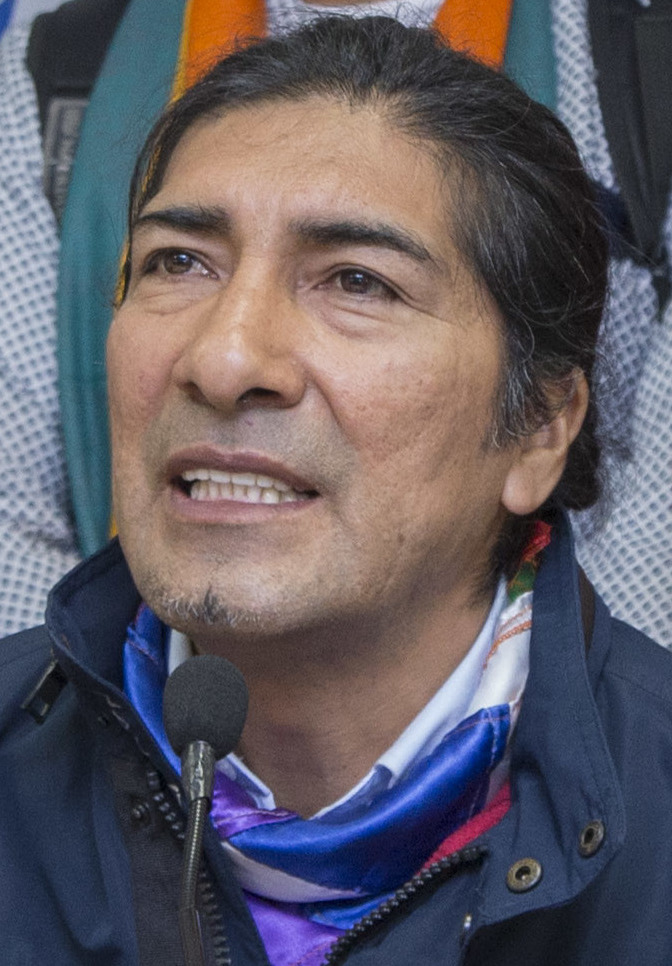

President and Coordinator-General of Andean Coordination of Indigenous Organizations
- Incumbent
- Assumed office 19 January 2017
- Preceded by: Gerardo Jumí Tapias

26th Provincial Prefect of Azuay Province
- In office 14 May 2019 – 5 October 2020
- Preceded by: Bolívar Saquipay
- Succeeded by: Cecilia Méndez Mora

President of ECUARUNARI
- In office 21 April 2013 – January 2019
- Preceded by: Delfín Tenesaca
- Succeeded by: Blanca Chancoso

Personal details
- Born: Carlos Ranulfo Pérez Guartambel; 26 February 1969 (age 57) Cuenca, Azuay, Ecuador
- Party: Pachakutik (until 2021)
- Spouse(s): Verónica Cevallos (m. 1998; died 2012) Manuela Picq (m. 2013)
- Children: 4
- Education: University of Cuenca (JD, Diploma in Watershed Management); Universidad Técnica Particular de Loja (Specialization in Environmental Law); University of Los Andes (Master in Criminal Law and Criminology)

Yaku Sacha Pérez Guartambel (born Carlos Ranulfo Pérez Guartambel, 26 February 1969), often simply known as Yaku Pérez, is an Ecuadorian politician and indigenous rights, human rights, and nature's rights activist, who ran for president of the country in the 2021 presidential elections and came third in the first round. He ran for president again in the 2023 elections.

Ethnically Cañari, Pérez is a former member of the eco-socialist Pachakutik Party. On 14 May 2019, he was elected as Provincial Prefect of the Azuay Province. As the former president of indigenous rights group ECUARUNARI, Pérez then rose to national prominence during the 2019 demonstrations against President Lenín Moreno's neoliberal economic policies. Described as an "anti-mining activist", Pérez has been involved in protests against water privatization efforts and the proposed Kimsacocha mining project, which led to him being charged with terrorism. Though a leftist, Pérez is noted for opposing the extractive measures championed by former socialist President Rafael Correa and his allies.

== Early life and education ==
Pérez was born in the Cuenca Canton of the Azuay Province on February 26, 1969. Pérez holds:

- a J.D. from the University of Cuenca, with specializations in indigenous justice, environmental law, criminal law and criminology;
- an advanced diploma in Watershed Management and Population from the Universidad de Cuenca.;
- a specialization in Penal Law and Indigenous Justice from UNIANDES;
- a specialization in Environmental Law from the Universidad Técnica Particular de Loja (UTPL);
- a master's degree in criminal law and criminology from UNIANDES

In 2017, he legally changed his name to Yaku Sacha, which translates to "Forest of Water" in the Quechua language. He stated that he consulted with both his mother and Pachamama before making his name change. He is of Quechua Cañari descent.

Pérez's first wife, Verónica Cevallos, died in 2012, following complications from cancer.

In 2013 he married Manuela Lavinas Picq, a French-Brazilian academic, through a Cañari ancestral rite.

== Early political career ==
After being involved in the Federation of Indigenous and Farming Organizations, Pérez became a city councilor in Cuenca, Ecuador in 1996.

In 2002, he participated in protests against Lucio Gutiérrez that sought to stop the privatisation of the water supply.

During the presidency of Rafael Correa, he was charged with "sabotage and terrorism" for blocking the roads in protest against the Quimsacocha mining project.

As an activist, Pérez announced his candidacy for the presidency of Ecuador in the 2017 Ecuadorian general election, but lost in the Pachakutik primary election to National Assembly member Lourdes Tibán. He later endorsed the center-right opposition candidate Guillermo Lasso in the run-off election, against Correa's deputy, the PAIS Alliance candidate Lenín Moreno, saying "A banker is preferable to a dictatorship that has deprived us of our territories, that has declared a state of exception, that has locked us in jail".

In 2017, he was elected to lead the Andean Coordination of Indigenous Organizations, ECUARUNARI.

== Rise to political prominence and presidential candidacy ==
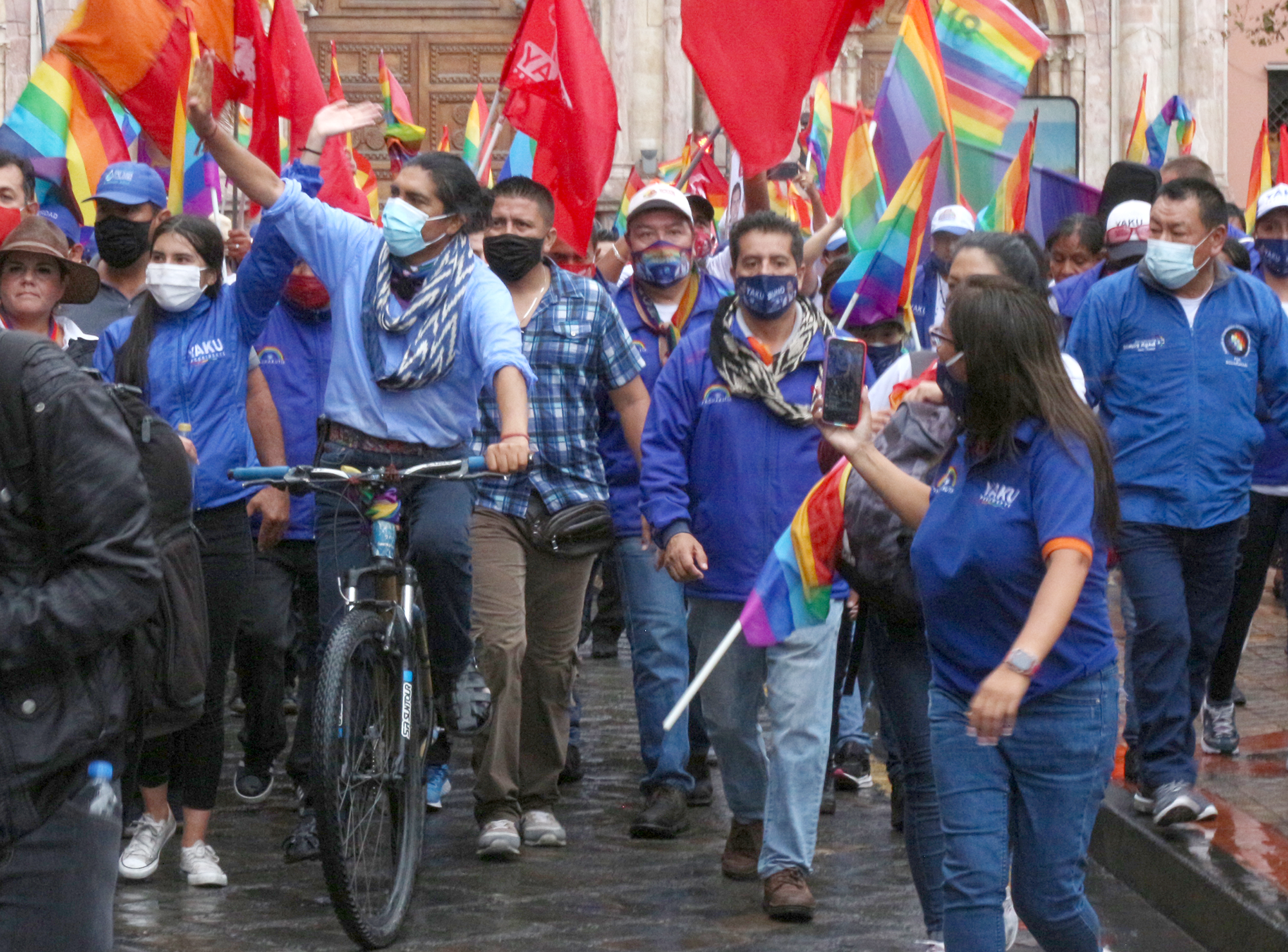
Pérez during his 2021 presidential campaign.

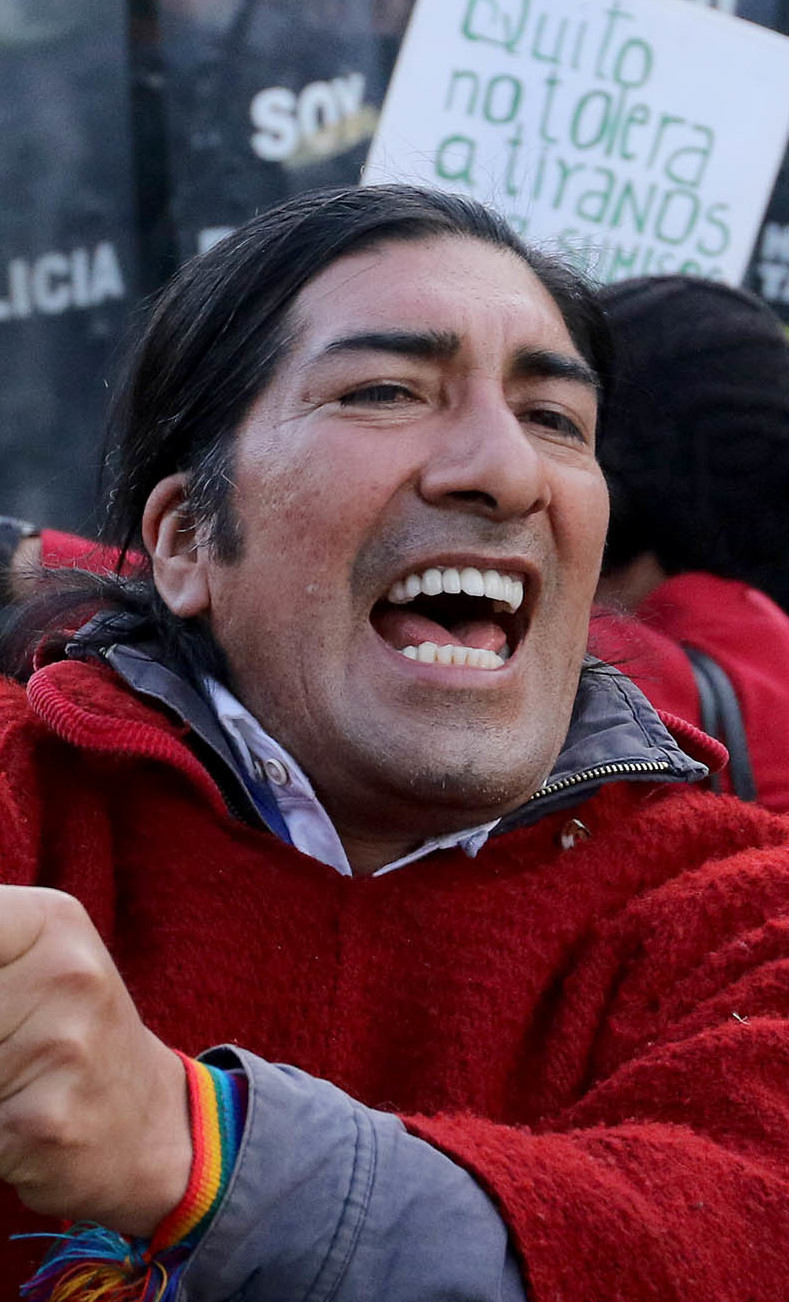
Pérez during a protest in 2015.

In May 2019, Pérez was elected to serve as the Prefect of the Azuay Province. During his tenure as Prefect, Pérez prioritized environmental and water policy, carrying out reforestation, promoting bicycle use in the province, and pushing to eliminate single-use plastic bags. Pérez rose to national prominence for his role in the 2019 demonstrations against the neoliberal economic policies of President Lenín Moreno. Pérez belonged to the indigenous political party, Pachakutik, and defended a "flexible and open left", hostile to the policies of Rafael Correa. He has said a free trade agreement with the United States is not an unreasonable proposal, depending on its details. He was a candidate in the 2021 Ecuadorian general election, coming in to a close third place, according to the controversial and partially revoked election commission. Initial exit polls put him at 20% in the first round of elections, making him the second-place candidate and therefore would participate in the run-off election against the former minister under Rafael Correa—Andrés Arauz. This was considered a surprising result, as unreliable and possibly biased pre-election polling had put Pérez in third place, behind Arauz and right-wing banker Guillermo Lasso.

In his first statement after the announcement of the partial results, Pérez welcomed a "victory for ecology and the defense of water".

On 19 May 2021, Pérez left Pachakutik in disagreement over the party's legislators working together with CREO to elect the new speaker of the National Assembly. He had earlier expressed his opposition to any legislative alliance with either of CREO or UNES.
