= Ximena Peña =

Ecuadorian politician

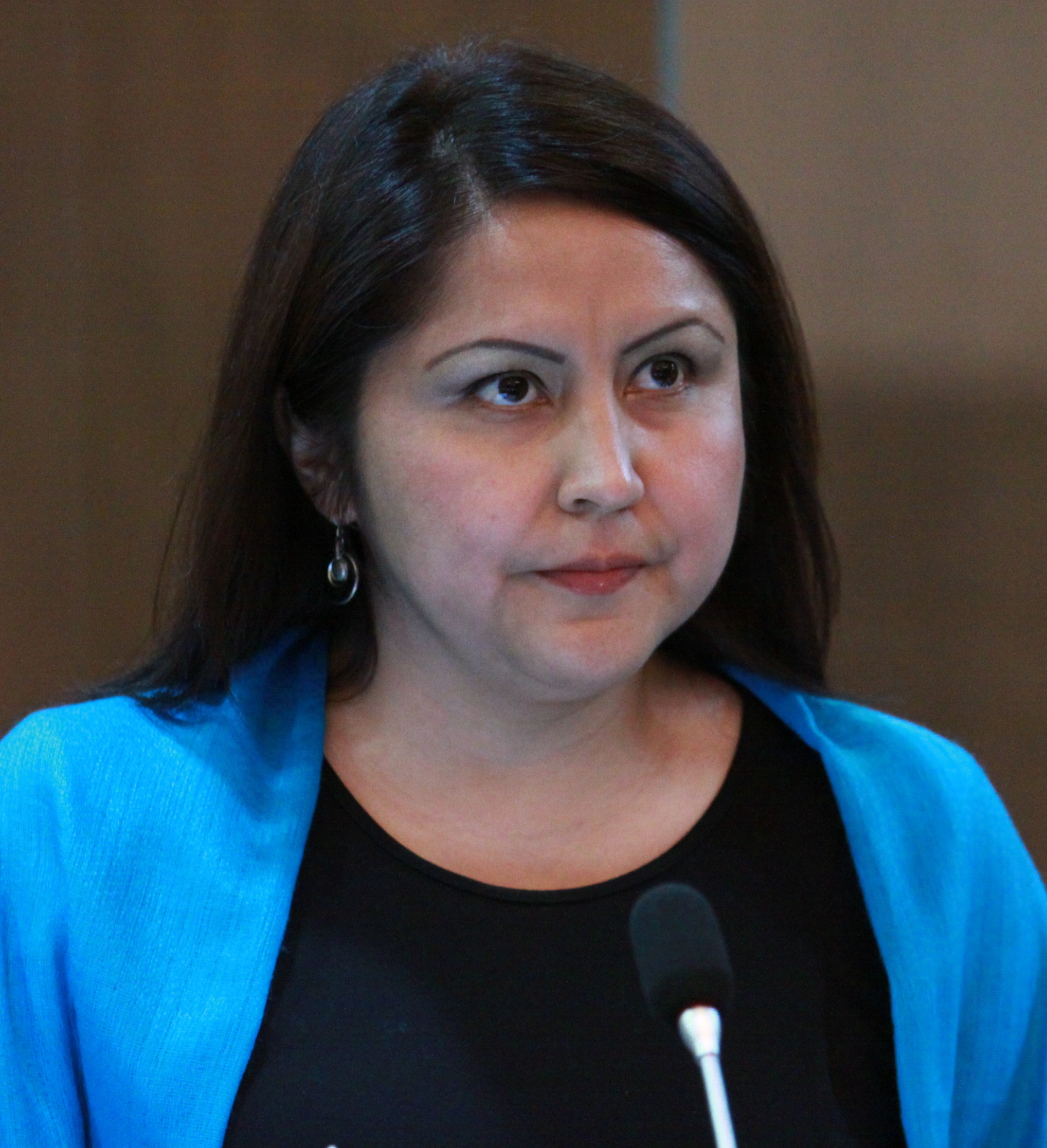
- Peña in 2013

National Assembly of Ecuador
- In office 24 May 2013 – 5 October 2020

Personal details
- Born: Ximena del Rocío Peña; 11 February 1976 (age 50) Cuenca, Ecuador

Ximena del Rocío Peña Pacheco (born 11 February 1976) is an Ecuadorian politician. She served as a member of the National Assembly from 2013 to 2020, and was the presidential candidate of the incumbent PAIS Alliance party in the 2021 election.

== Career ==
Ximena Peña was born in Cuenca, Ecuador, on 11 February 1976. She moved to New York City at the age of 19. She earned an associate degree from LaGuardia Community College, then entered Baruch College. At Baruch, she completed a Bachelor and Master of Business Administration. Peña returned to Ecuador in 2008 and joined the PAIS Alliance political party.

In the 2013 general elections, Peña was elected to the National Assembly for the United States and Canada overseas constituency. She was reelected in 2017. In May 2019, she became the president of the Justice and State Structure Commission in the National Assembly. She also led the parliamentary group for Human Rights and Mobility. In 2020, Peña was coordinator of her party's legislative bloc in the assembly during the third legislative period of the National Assembly, a position she resigned in July 2020.

In a national party convention, Peña was chosen as the presidential candidate of the PAIS Alliance for the 2021 election. Her vice-presidential candidate was Patricio Barriga, who had served as a Secretary of Communications under the Correa government. Peña was the only female presidential candidate in this election, although there were several female vice presidential candidates.
