= SUMA Party =

Right-wing Neoliberal political party in Ecuador

SUMA Party Partido Sociedad Unida Más Acción
- Leader: Guillermo Celi
- Secretary: Cristina López
- Founded: 1 November 2012
- Headquarters: Quito
- Youth wing: Youth SUMA 23
- Membership: 153,414 (2016)
- Ideology: Neoliberalism; Big tent
- Political position: Right-wing
- National affiliation: Democratic Convergence for Unity (2015-2016); Alliance for Change (2016-2023); Let's Act (2023-)
- Colors: Turquoise; White; Orange
- Seats in the National Assembly: 0 / 151 including alliances
- Prefects: 1 / 23 including alliances
- Mayors: 25 / 221 including alliances

Website
- https://www.suma.ec/

The United Society - More Action, or SUMA Party (Spanish: Partido Sociedad Unida Más Acción) is an Ecuadorian political party, founded by Mauricio Rodas and Guillermo Celi in 2012. The party was initially led by Rodas; it was under his leadership until his political retirement in 2019. The party currently is led by Celi.

== History ==
Mauricio Rodas and Guillermo Celi founded the party in 2012, and attempted to register the party on May 15 with the National Electoral Council (CNE). Due to signature verification issues, the CNE rejected the party's registration. Following this, the party appealed to the Electoral Contentious Tribunal, which ruled in favor of SUMA; registering the party on November 1, 2012, with the electoral number 23. SUMA participated in the 2013 Ecuadorian general election, coming in fourth place in the presidential election receiving 3.9% of the vote, and obtaining one seat in the general assembly.

Following the 2013 general election, Rodas launched his campaign for Metropolitan Mayor of Quito, winning the position in the 2014 local elections against then incumbent mayor Augusto Barrera, with 61% of the vote. At the national level, the party won 3 prefecture seats and 15 other mayorships. After taking office, Rodas began rapprochement with other parties and figures opposed to the government of Rafael Correa. On February 23, 2015, Rodas met with Jaime Nebot, the former mayor of Guayaquil, and Paúl Carrasco, the former prefect of Azuay, forming the coalition Democratic Convergence for Unity. SUMA participated in the coalition until October 7, 2016, in order to join the Alliance for Change coalition, formed and led by Guillermo Lasso and his CREO party. Following the 2017 Ecuadorian general election, SUMA received 8 seats.

Although Rodas began his period in the Metropolitan Mayor's Office of Quito with considerable popular acceptance, poor management, corruption scandals, among many other problems of his administration, eroded his political image; therefore, after finishing his term at the head of the capital municipality, he retired from national politics and went to reside in Mexico. Rodas' scandals tarnished SUMA's image, so the movement sought to participate in the 2019 local elections through multiple electoral alliances, mainly with right-wing and centrist political organizations, notably absent in the race for the mayoralty of Quito, after Mauricio Rodas' refusal to run for re-election. During the local elections, SUMA obtained two prefectures and 13 mayorships.

After Rodas' departure, the party's leadership was assumed by Guillermo Celi, who ran as SUMA's candidate in the 2021 Ecuadorian general election, obtaining tenth place, with only 0.91% of the vote. In the simultaneous legislative elections, the party did not win any seats. In the presidential runoff, Celi and SUMA once again supported Lasso, who was ultimately elected. Thus, after Guillermo Lasso took office, SUMA became part of government, with Sebastián Palacios Muñoz, a party member, being appointed as Minister of Sports as a political quota.

In the extraordinary 2023 Ecuadorian general election, SUMA, together with the Advance Party (Ecuador), formed the Let's Act alliance, nominating former Vice President Otto Sonnenholzner, who finished in fifth place.

== Election results ==
=== Presidential elections ===
chart

| Year | Candidates | | First Round | | Second Round | | Results | Notes |
| Year | President | Vice President | Votes | % | Votes | % | Results | Notes |
|---|---|---|---|---|---|---|---|---|
| 2013 | Mauricio Rodas | Ines Manzano | 335,532 | 3.90% | | | 4th place | |
| 2017 | Guillermo Lasso | Veronica Seville | 2,653,403 | 28.09% | 4,833,389 | 48.84% | 2nd place | In alliance with CREO |
| 2021 | Guillermo Celi | Andrés Páez | 84,737 | 0.91% | | | 10th place | |
| 2023 | Otto Sonnenholzner | Erika Paredes | 696,548 | 7.06% | | | 5th plac | Part of the Let's Act alliance |

=== Legislative elections ===
| Year | Votes | % | Seats | +/- | Notes |
|---|---|---|---|---|---|
| 2013 | 2,829,034 | 3.22% | 1 / 137 | | |
| 2017 | 20,589,460 | 20.06% | 34 / 137 | ▲33 | In alliance with CREO |
| 2021 | 135,022 | 1.68% | 0 / 137 | ▼34 | |
| 2023 | 377,953 | 4.51% | 7 / 137 | ▲7 | Part of the Let's Act alliance |
| 2025 | 149,404 | 1.64% | 0 / 151 | ▼7 | |

=== Local Elections ===
| Year | Prefects | | Mayors | |
| Year | % of votes | No. of Prefectures | % of votes | No. of Mayors |
|---|---|---|---|---|
| 2014 | 8.69% | 2 / 23 | 6.79% | 15 / 221 |
| 2019 | 8.69% | 2 / 23 | 5.88% | 13 / 221 |
| 2023 | 4.35% | 1 / 23 | 11.31% | 25 / 221 |
