= Manuela Picq =

Franco-Brazilian journalist (born 1977)

Manuela Lavinas Picq (born in 1977) is a Franco-Brazilian radical feminist academic, journalist, and political activist. She is married to Yaku Pérez Guartambel, a prominent Ecuadorian indigenous rights activist and politician.

== Biography ==
Picq is a Senior Lecturer in the Departments of Political Science and Sexuality, Women’s and Gender Studies at Amherst College. She is the author of scholarly books and articles, including Vernacular Sovereignties: Indigenous Women Challenging World Politics (University of Arizona Press 2018) and contributes to international media outlets. Her work at the intersection of scholarship, journalism, and activism led her to be detained and expelled from Ecuador in 2015. She was nominated a New Generation of Public Intellectuals (2018) and featured in the FemiList 100 (2021) of women working in law, policy, and peacebuilding across the Global South. In 2023, she coordinated the electoral campaign of presidential candidate Yaku Perez in Ecuador.

Picq received a master in History from the French University Pierre Mendes France and a PhD in International Studies from the University of Miami. Her doctoral research about human rights in Brazil focused on police violence, racism, and the AIDS health crisis.

In 2004, Picq moved to Ecuador to teach International Relations as a faculty member at Universidad San Francisco de Quito - where she taught until 2024. In 2018, Picq was nominated as part of a New Generation of Public Intellectuals in Latin America by the independent, non-partisan think tank Global Americans. In 2015, her violent and arbitrary detention in Ecuador was showcased by Frontline Defenders, an international human rights organization founded in Dublin in 2011 with the specific aim of protecting human rights defenders at risk.

Picq was a regular contributor to Al Jazeera English between 2011 and 2014, where she published revelations about corruption within the Rafael Correa government, including the Glas Viejó case, in which the father of Vice President Jorge Glas was involved. Glas Viejó, father of then vice-president Jorge Glas, repeatedly raped the 11-year-old daughter of his domestic worker; he threatened the child into silence, but one day, she passed out at school, and at the hospital, doctors found out she was pregnant by her rapist. The rapist recognized the child but was never detained; Manuela Picq, together with Martha Roldos and Pedra Granja, denounced the rape, and the rapist was eventually detained; all three suffered repression for their active voices in the Glas Viejó case.

On August 21, 2013, Picq married in an indigenous ceremony Yaku Pérez Guartambel, who was serving as president of the ECUARUNARI. Two years later, during the 2015 protests, she was arrested by police at a demonstration, and her visa was canceled the next day by Rafael Correa's Ecuadorian government. Picq fled the country on August 21 as a result of "legal limbo".

Picq’s case was discussed by the international network Scholars at Risk. After being forced out of Ecuador in 2015, Picq receive a short scholarship at the Desigualdades.Net institute of the Free University of Berlin; then in 2016 she joined Amherst College as a visiting professor. Picq returned to Ecuador on January 15, 2018, four days after the Ecuadorian government granted citizenship to Julian Assange and subsequently authorized her return.

In 2024, Picq won the International Studies Association's IPE Outstanding Activist Scholar Award -- formerly awarded to activist scholars such as Angela Davis, Naomi Klein, David Graeber and Walden Bello – for her blend of academic excellence and social activism.

== 2015 Ecuador Protests ==
In August 2015, Manuela covered a series of peaceful indigenous-led protests in Ecuador for Jazeera English. Citizens took to the streets to express their discontent over a series of issues ranging from extractive policies damaging the environment to government efforts to eliminate presidential term limits. The mobilizations were violently repressed, especially in Quito but also in rural communities such as Saraguro, as police forces beat and arbitrarily detained peaceful protesters, especially Indigenous peoples. A Human Rights Watch report indicates that "police or military personnel used unnecessary and unlawful force against unarmed people in at least 50 cases," including beatings and arbitrary detentions of dozens of people and unlawful entry into the homes of people who were not involved in the protests in any capacity.

Manuela was beaten and detained on the night of August 13 in the streets of the historic center of Quito, then spent the night under police escort at the hospital Eugenio Espejo. In the morning, her visa 12-VIII was revoked, and she was detained in a center for undocumented immigrants. Four days later, a judge ordered her release due to a lack of evidence of misbehavior, yet the government refused to reinstate her visa. The Ministry of the Interior ordered the courts to transfer the case to the executive branch, and Picq left for Brazil.

Following the illegal revocation of her visa in 2015, Manuela was repeatedly denied a Mercosur visa until 2018, when Foreign Minister Maria Fernanda Espinosa finally granted the visa under the administration of President Lenin Moreno. That same year, the investigative network Plan V listed Manuela among the survivors of repression by the Correa government.

== Ancestral marriage ==
In May 2022, Manuela and her partner Yaku Pérez Guartambel set an international legal precedent when the Committee for the Elimination of Racial Discrimination (CERD) at the Office of High Commissioner for Human Rights (OHCHR) of the United Nations issued an opinion requiring Ecuador to recognize the legal validity of their ancestral marriage.

It all started in 2015 after Manuela Picq was forcibly separated from her husband, the Kichwa-Kañari indigenous water defender Yaku Pérez Guartambel. Picq’s detention and expulsion from Ecuador prompted Pérez to seek legal recognition of their ancestral marriage to secure her return home on a family visa, which is legally guaranteed to foreign spouses of Ecuadorians. After being denied the visa multiple times by the Ecuadorian government on claims that their Indigenous marriage was folkloric and not valid legally, Yaku appealed to international human rights mechanisms. His legal journey started in local Ecuadorian courts and reached all the way to the Office of High Commissioner for Human Rights (OHCHR) in 2016.

After 8 years, CERD ruled that the refusal to recognize ancestral marriages and imposing indigenous persons to hold additional weddings at the state’s civil registry constituted discrimination, risking forced assimilation. In the Decision, CERD Committee member Michał Balcerzak stated that "Refusing to recognize the marriage of indigenous peoples and requesting them to hold another wedding before civil registry officials is discriminatory… It could contribute to jeopardizing cultural practices and amount to forced assimilation." CERD determined that Ecuador had discriminated against Pérez and required that Ecuador’s state register his ancestral marriage in Ecuador’s Civil Registry without additional requirements or procedures. It also mandated Ecuador to translate CERD's Opinion into Kichwa, formally adopt Indigenous marriage in Ecuadorian law, train civil servants to register future ancestral marriages at civil registries nationally and provide reparations to Pérez. In November 2022, Ecuador's Civil Registry formally registered Picq and Pérez's marriage certificate, permitting Picq to obtain a family visa in 2023. The state has yet to adopt a law recognizing indigenous ancestral marriage and to offer reparations.

CERD's decision on Perez and Picq’s ancestral marriage set an international legal precedent for Indigenous peoples worldwide, validating their authority to determine the civil status of their members from marriage to birth to death. This precedent demonstrates how indigenous communities utilize the international system to expand rights in local contexts and highlights how Picq and Pérez intertwined love and self-determination to defend territory. By recognizing ancestral marriages, the decision empowers Indigenous communities to uphold their cultural practices and strengthens their autonomy in defining personal and communal relations along ancestral lifeways.

== Books ==
- Savages and Citizens: How Indigeneity Shapes the State (2024)
- Soberanías Vernáculas: Las Mujeres Indígenas Desafían la Política Global (2023)
- Vernacular Sovereignties: Indigenous Women Challenging World Politics (2019)
- Sexuality and Translation in World Politics (2019)
- Queering Narratives of Modernity (2016)
- Sexualities in World Politics: How LGBTQ claims shape International Relations (2015)
