= Guillermo Celi =

Ecuadorian politician and lawyer (born 1976)

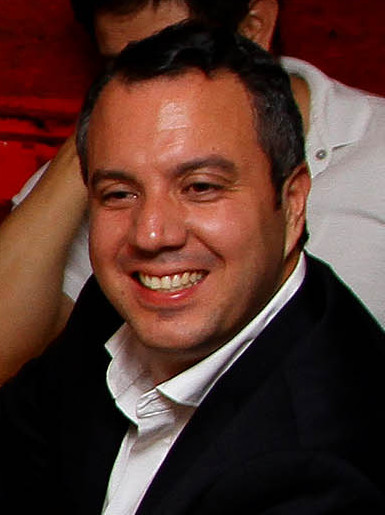
- Celi in 2015

Member of the National Assembly
- In office May 14, 2017 – September 29, 2020

National Director of the SUMA Party
- In office Since 2014

Personal details
- Party: SUMA Party
- Other political affiliations: Patriotic Society Party (before 2012)
- Education: Pontifical Catholic University of Ecuador

Guillermo Alejandro Celi Santos (born February 5, 1976) is a doctor of jurisprudence, lawyer, and Ecuadorian politician, known for being the national director of the SUMA Party. On May 17, 2017, he took office as a National Assembly Member after being elected in the 2017 Ecuadorian general election for the SUMA-CREO alliance.

== Biography ==
Celi was born on February 5, 1976, in the city of Portoviejo, province of Manabí. He completed his secondary studies at the Cristo Rey Educational Unit of Portoviejo and his higher education at the Pontifical Catholic University of Ecuador, where he obtained his doctorate in jurisprudence.

Before starting his political career, he practiced as a lawyer and university professor.

He was a trustee of the city of Portoviejo during the term of Mayor Humberto Guillem. He was one of the founders of the "Pragmatic Ecuador" collective, the predecessor organization to the SUMA Party. He began his political career in 2009, participating in the 2009 Ecuadorian local elections as a candidates for the prefecture of Manabí, with the Patriotic Society Party

During the 2013 Ecuadorian general election he ran as a candidate for the assembly of Manabí with the SUMA Party. He was made the national director of the SUMA Party a year later in 2014.

During the 2017 Ecuadorian general election he was elected as a National Assemblyman for the SUMA-CREO alliance. Near the end of his term, he resigned to run as the presidential candidate for the 2021 Ecuadorian presidential election. He obtained 10th place with 0.91% of the vote.
