= Gustavo Larrea =

Former Interior Minister of Ecuador

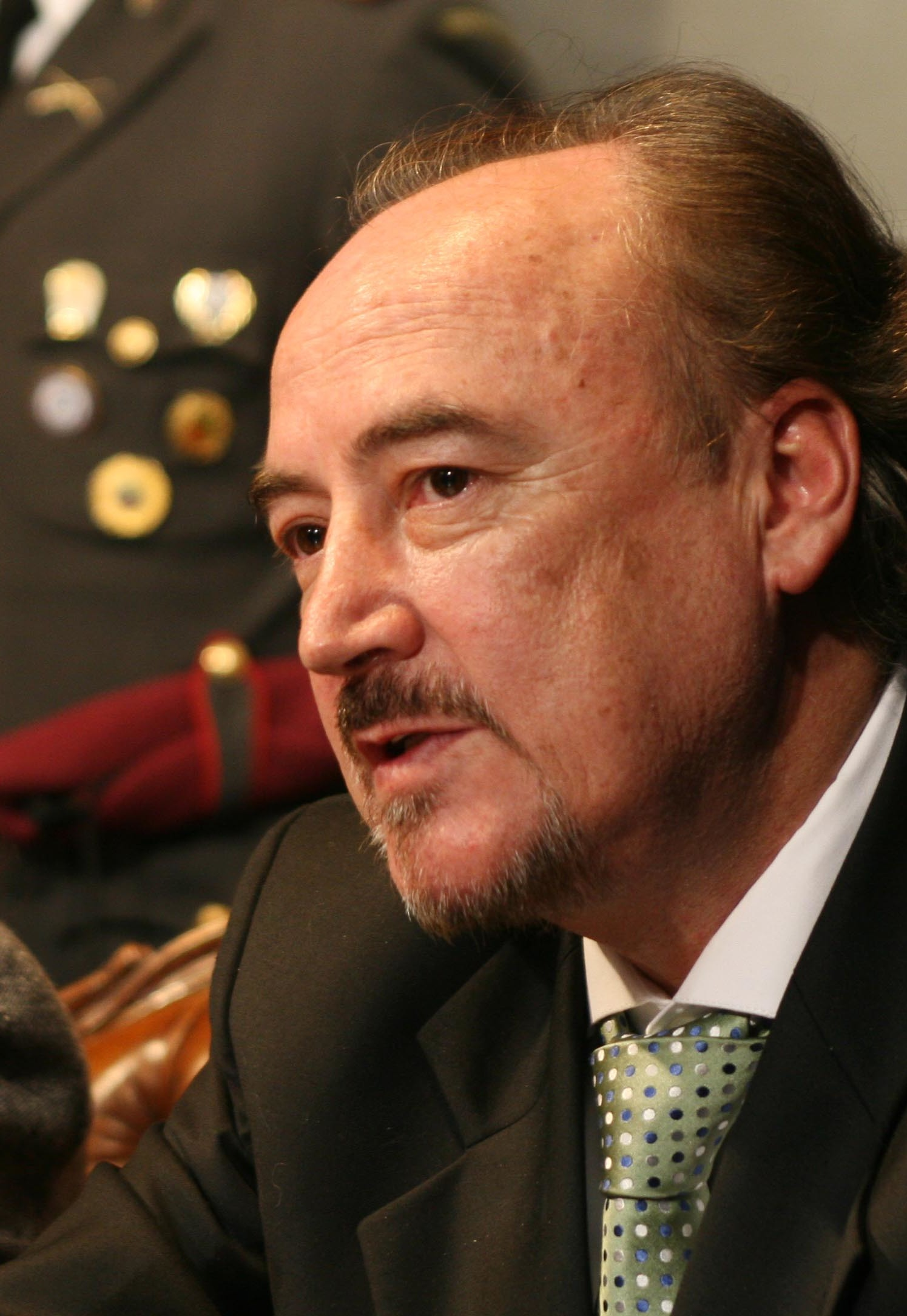
- Gustavo Larrea

Minister of Government of Ecuador
- In office 2006–2007
- President: Rafael Correa

Personal details
- Born: Quito, Ecuador
- Party: Democracia Sí (formerly Alianza PAIS)
- Profession: Lawyer, politician

Gustavo Larrea is a former Interior Minister of Ecuador who had been appointed in 2006. A commission set up by President Rafael Correa to investigate Operacion Fenix alleged that Larrea had direct links to FARC, which Larrea disputed. By 2011 Larrea had become a notable critic of President Correa, particularly in regard to an effort to "revamp" the judicial system. Larrea called this idea "an authoritarian project" and an attempt to "control the courts".

== Early life and education ==
Gustavo Larrea was born in Quito, Ecuador. He studied law at the Central University of Ecuador but became politically active at a young age, particularly in leftist student movements during the 1980s.His activism during his university years helped shape his future political ideology.

== Political career ==
Larrea began his political career in the 1990s, advocating for democratic reforms and greater transparency in government.He served as a congressman in Ecuador's National Congress before being appointed Minister of Government under President Rafael Correa in 2006.

=== Role in Rafael Correa's Government ===
As Minister of Government (equivalent to Interior Minister), Larrea played a pivotal role in the early years of Rafael Correa's presidency. He participated in the implementation of internal security policies and the restructuring of Ecuador's intelligence services.He was widely seen as one of Correa's closest advisors during the formation of the Alianza PAIS political movement.

=== Alleged Links to FARC ===
In 2008, Gustavo Larrea was accused by Colombian officials of having ties to the FARC guerrilla group after the raid on a FARC camp in Ecuadorian territory. Documents allegedly found in a computer belonging to FARC leader Raúl Reyes mentioned meetings with Ecuadorian officials, including Larrea. Larrea denied any wrongdoing, stating that any meetings were part of peace negotiations and authorized by the government.

Ecuador's own intelligence and legal institutions did not pursue criminal charges against Larrea.He publicly criticized the Colombian government's violation of Ecuadorian sovereignty during the raid, reinforcing his claim that Ecuador's government was committed to peace and territorial integrity.

=== Later Activities and Political Comeback ===
After leaving Correa's government, Larrea distanced himself from Alianza PAIS and founded his own political movement called “Democracia Sí” in 2017.The party aimed to provide an alternative to both Correa's populism and the traditional right-wing establishment in Ecuador. Larrea has since been active in promoting constitutional reforms and anti-corruption policies.

== Criticism and Controversies ==
Larrea has faced criticism from both sides of Ecuador's political spectrum. Correa loyalists accused him of betrayal for launching a rival political party, while others questioned his role in the FARC scandal. Despite this, no court has found Larrea guilty of any criminal misconduct, and he continues to be an influential voice in Ecuadorian politics.
