= Coalition Movement =

Political party in Ecuador

Coalition Movement Movimiento Concertación
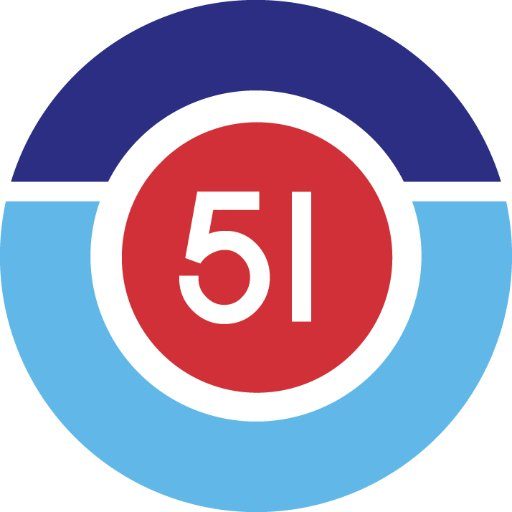
- Abbreviation: MC
- Leader: César Montúfar
- President: Alfredo Carrasco
- Founders: César Montúfar
- Founded: 2007; 18 years ago
- Registered: 29 May 2014; 10 years ago
- Dissolved: 27 November 2021; 3 years ago
- Headquarters: Quito
- Membership (2016): 161,676
- Ideology: Economic liberalism
- Political position: Centre-right
- Colors: Turquoise; Dark Blue
- Seats in the National Assembly: 0 / 137
- Provincial Prefects: 0 / 23
- Mayors: 2 / 221

The Coalition Movement (in Spanish: Movimiento Concertación) was a political party in Ecuador. Its leader was César Montúfar, who was an assemblyman for Pichincha in the 2009–2013 period.
