= ECUARUNARI =

ECUARUNARI (in Kichwa: Ecuador Runakunapak Rikcharimuy, "Movement of the indigenous people of Ecuador"), also known as Confederation of Peoples of Kichwa Nationality (Ecuador Kichwa Llaktakunapak Jatun Tantanakuy, in Spanish Confederación de Pueblos de la Nacionalidad Kichwa del Ecuador) is the organization of indigenous peoples of Kichwa nationality in the Ecuadorian central mountain region, founded in 1972.

Twelve ethnic groups of the region—Natabuela, Otavalos, Karanki (Caranqui), Kayampi (Cayambi), Kitu Kara (Quitu), Panzaleo, Salasaca, Chibuleo, Puruhá, Guranga, Kañari and Saraguros—are represented politically by the Confederation. ECUARUNARI is one of three major regional groupings that constitute the Confederation of Indigenous Nationalities of Ecuador (CONAIE). It is also member of the Andean indigenous organization, Coordination of Indigenous Organizations of the Andes (Coordinadora Andina de Organizaciones Indígenas, CAOI).

The current president of ECUARUNARI is Alberto Ainawano from Kichwa-chibuleo. A notable member is Carmen Tiupul who is a member of Ecuador's National Assembly.
