= Patricia Núñez =

Ecuadorian politician

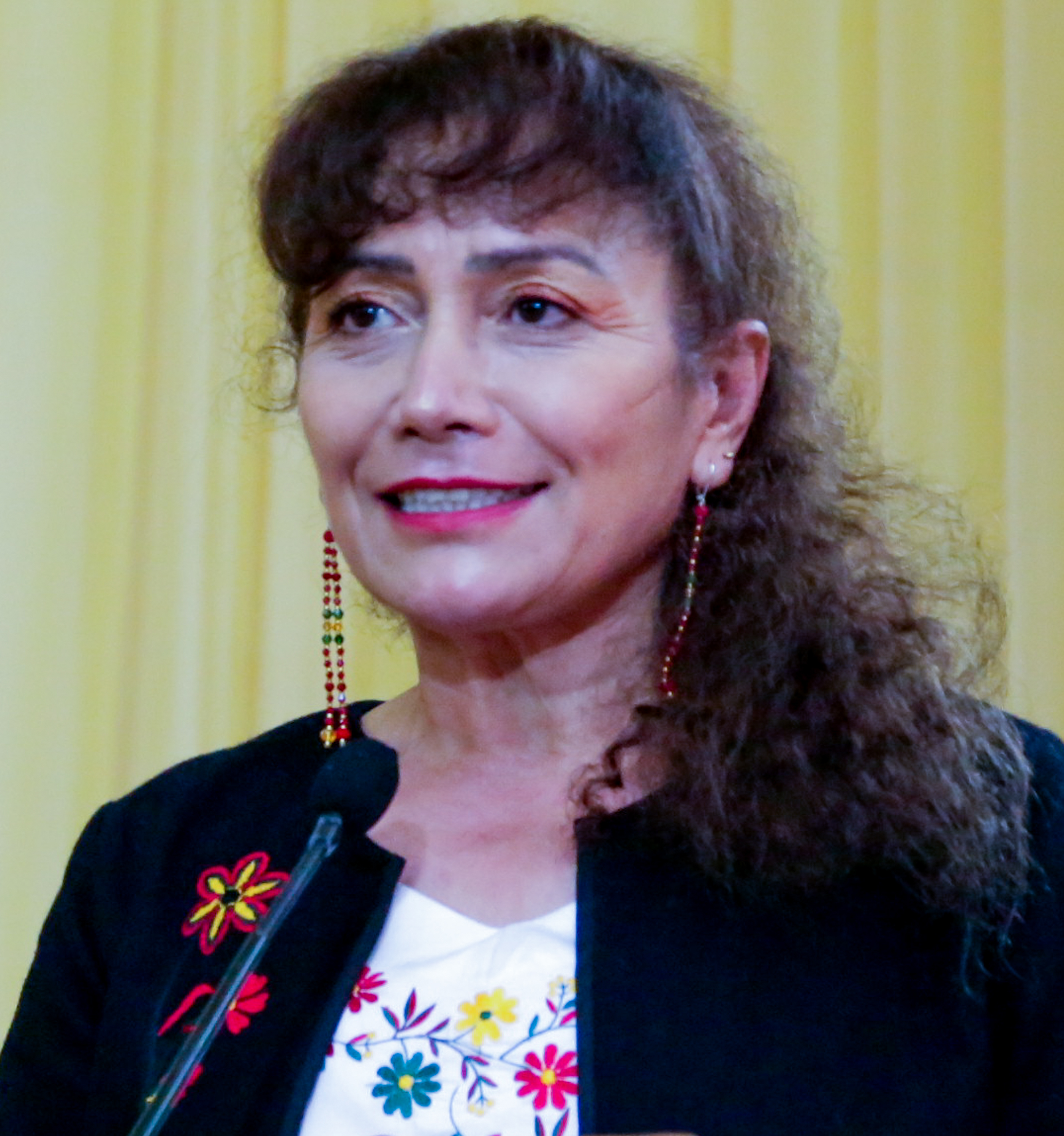
- at the National Assembly
- Education: Technical University of Ambato
- Occupation: politician
- Known for: member of the National Assembly
- Political party: Citizen Revolution Movement

Silvia Patricia Núñez Ramos is an Ecuadorian engineer turned politician in the Citizen Revolution Movement. She was elected to the National Assembly in 2021 and re-elected in 2023.

== Life ==
In 2004, she studied civil engineering at the Technical University of Ambato. In 2011, she earned her master's degree at the Universidad Nacional de Chimborazo in the management of social projects. The following year, she completed a one-year training program at the Higher School of Chimborazo Polytechnic.

In 2020, she taught at the Universidad Nacional de Chimborazo.

She was elected to represent Chimborazo at the National Assembly in 2021. The sitting President of the assembly, Guadalupe Llori, was voted out at the end of May. Núñez said she voted against Guadalupe Llori because that was the recommendation.

In September 2022 she filed charges with the Legislative Administration Council against fellow Assembly member and president of the Oversight Commission Fernando Villavicencio. She said that he had called her a pig and "Ugly Betty" on social media. Villavicencio, was suspended from the Assembly for 31 days after consideration by the President of the Assembly and two others.

She takes part in the recovery effort following the landslides in the Alausí canton in March 2023.

The President of Ecuador Guillermo Lasso brought in the constitution clause number 148 known as Mutual death in May 2023 when he knew that he was about to be impeached. This required all of the National Assembly members to stand for re-election. Herrara and 67 others stood for re-election and she was one of the 43 re-elected later that year. The others included Pierina Correa, Paola Cabezas, Sofía Sánchez, Gissella Molina and Patricia Mendoza.

She returned to the assembly for the Citizen Revolution party and in November 2023 she was elected to the Assembly's commission on Food Sovereignty and Development of the Agricultural and Fisheries Sector. It was led by Jaminton Intriago - and Marjorie Rosado as President and vice-president. The other members were Amy Gende, Andrea Rivadeneira, Eduardo Mendoza, Viviana Zambrano, Mónica Palacios and Roberto Cuero.

Núñez was elected as a member of a special commission set up by the National Assembly to investigate the death of Second Lieutenant Pamela Ati at an army barracks. The majority report by Eduardo Mariño, Alex Grefa, Rosa Mayorga and Núñez concluded that the state was at fault for not anticipating sexual assaults of this type. The report mentioned Defense Minister Gian Carlo Loffredo, Minister of Women Arianna Tanca, and Prosecutor Diana Salazar Méndez and recommended their impeachment. Ati died in July and the first autopsy indicated sexual assault and six soldiers were accused. A latter autopsy disagreed and the argument continued.

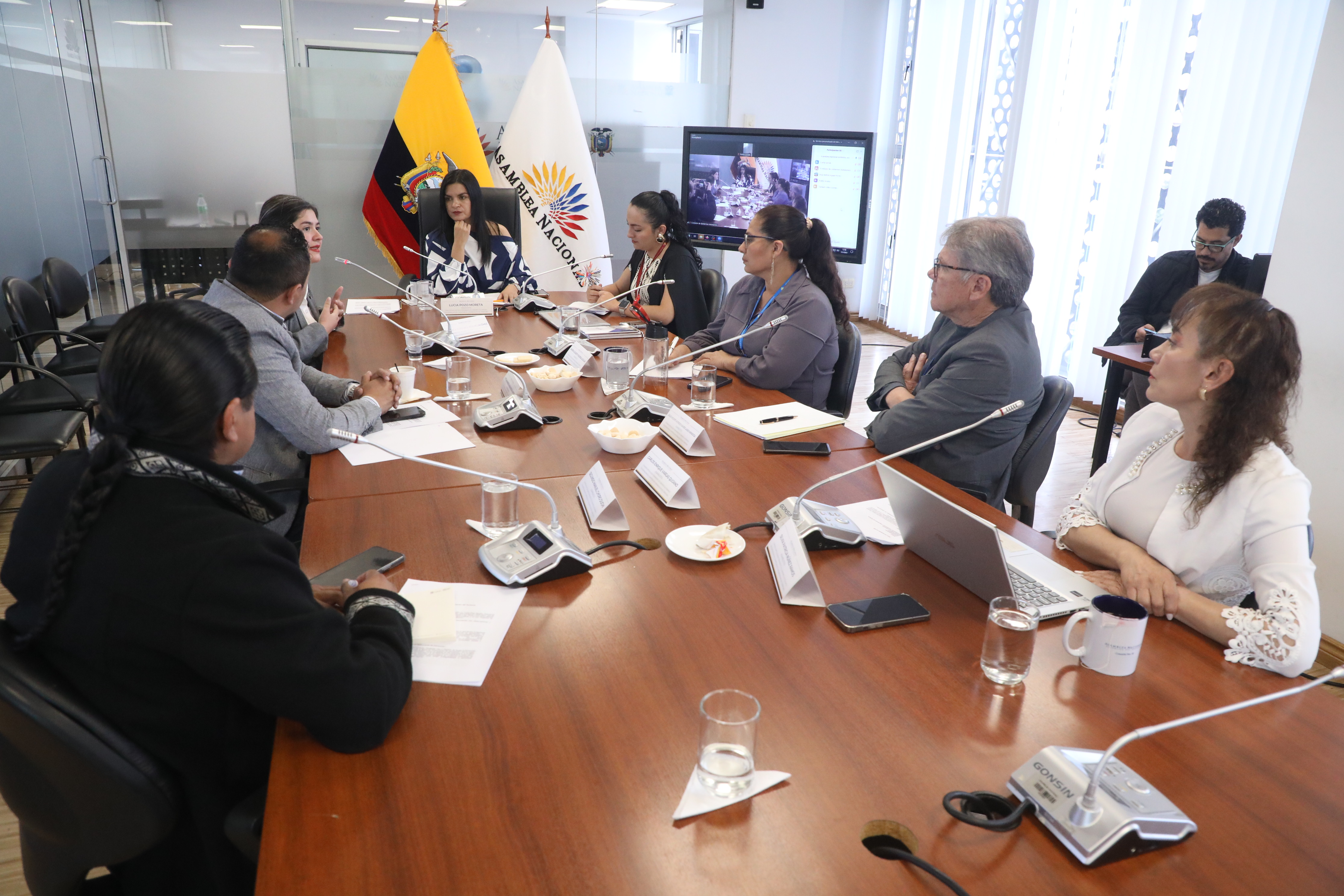
Lucía Pozo Moreta chairing the Commission of Autonomous Governments, Decentralization, Competencies and Territorial Organization in September 2025. Núñez is on the right

Núñez was elected again in 2025 and served on the Commission of Autonomous Governments, Decentralization, Competencies and Territorial Organizations led by Lucía Pozo Moreta. The other commissioners include Sandra Elizabeth Figueroa Aguilar.
