= Ana María Raffo =

Ecuadorian politician

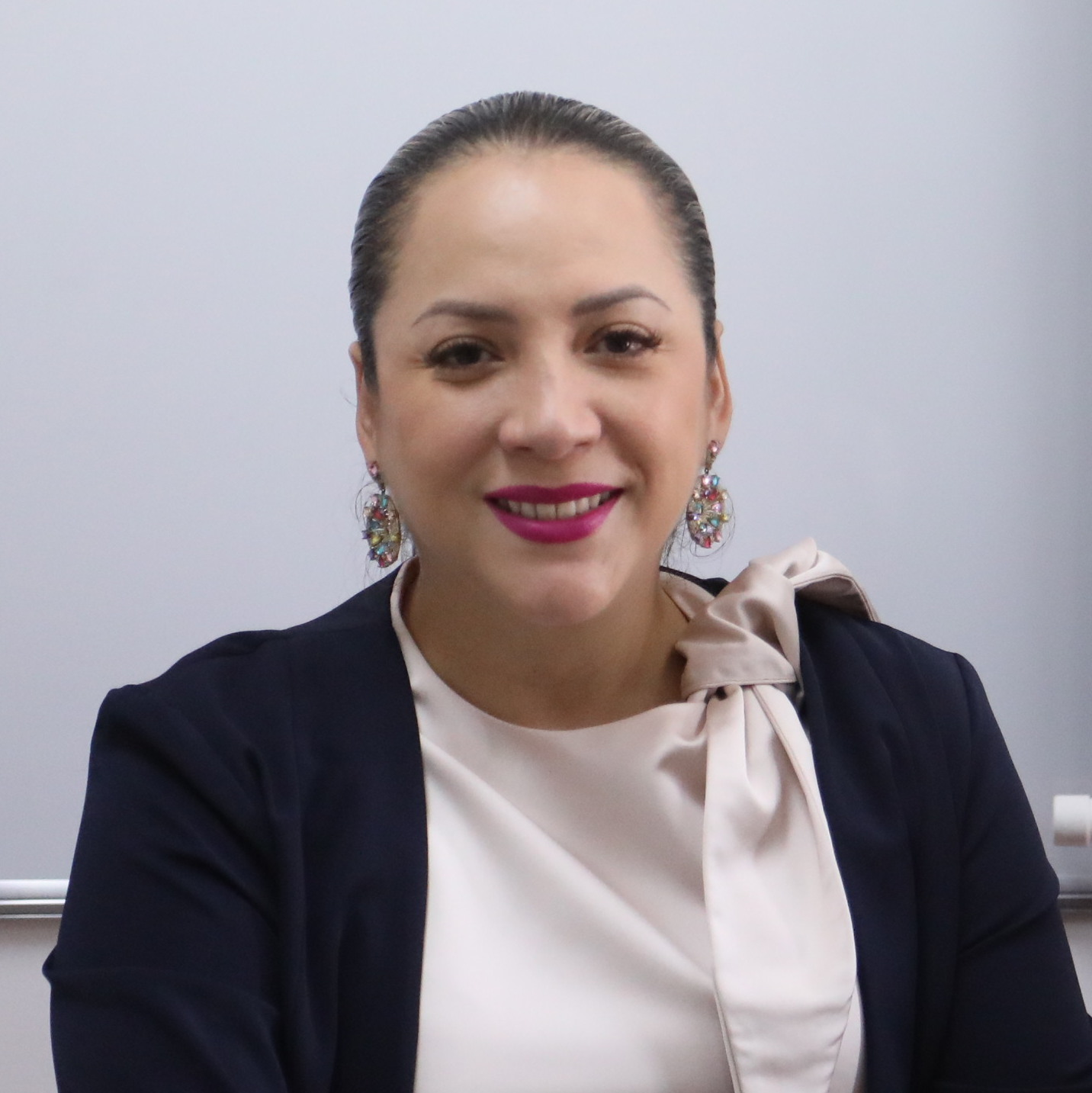
- in 2026
- Occupation: Politician
- Known for: represents the Guayas Province at the National Assembly
- Political party: Democratic Center

Ana Maria Raffo Guevara is an Ecuadorian politician who represents the Guayas Province at the National Assembly. She is a member of the Democratic Center. She was elected in 2021, 2023 and 2025.

== Life ==
In 2008 she was working as a government manager for the Republic's President. By 2014 she had been promoted to be one of his advisors. She left that employment in 2017 when she became an advisor to the National Assembly.

She joined the Democratic Center party and at the 2021 election she was elected to represent the Guayas Province at the National Assembly. Her substitute was Barahona Kelber Bermudez. She sits on the "Permanent Commission on Education, Culture, Science, Technology, Innovation and Ancestral Knowledge". Other members of that commission include Zolanda Pluas, Mariuxi Sanchez and Isabel Enriquez.

In June 2022 she was among the members who requested a debate concerning the replacement of President Guillermo Lasso because of his alleged mismanagement. Forty-six other members supported the proposal including Vanessa Álava, Jhajaira Urresta, Patricia Mendoza, Victoria Desintonio, Viviana Veloz and Rosa Mayorga. In February 2023 she was accusing Lasso's government of stealing democracy from the people.

The President of Ecuador Guillermo Lasso brought in an unusual constitution clause (number 148) known as Mutual death in May 2023 when he knew that he was about to be impeached. This required all of the National Assembly members to stand for re-election. Following her restoration to the assembly she was voted in as a member of the Assembly's Commission into Education, Culture, Science, Technology, Innovation and Ancestral Knowledge. The other members were Mauricio Zambrano, Jahiren Noriega, Zolanda Pluas, Nathaly Morillo, Dallyana Passailaigue, Cecilia Baltazar, Hernán Zapata and Juan Carlos Camacho.

Raffo was re-elected in 2025 to represent the Guayas Province for the Citizen Revolution party. She joined the National Assembly's Commission on Education, Culture, Science and Technology, Innovation and Ancestral Knowledge again. It was chaired by Cecilia Baltazar and other members included Monica Salazar Hidalgo and Ana Belén Yela Duarte.
