= Mónica Palacios (politician) =

Ecuadorian politician

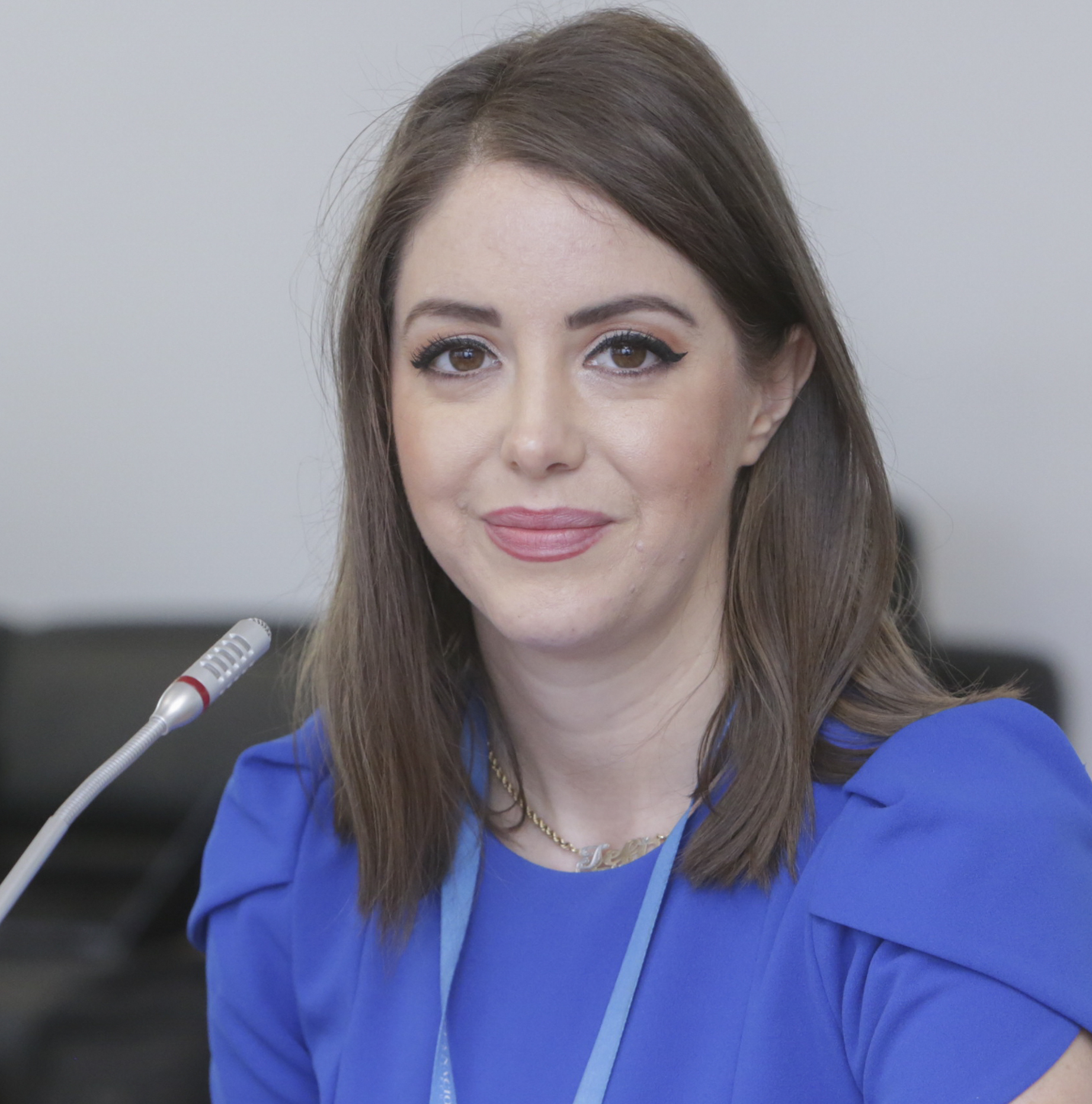
- Mónica Palacios in 2021.
- Born: September 6, 1987 (age 38)
- Other name: Mónica Estefanía Palacios Zambrano
- Education: Queens College, City University of New York
- Occupation: politician
- Political party: Democratic Center then Citizen Revolution Movement

Mónica Estefanía Palacios Zambrano is an Ecuadorian politician who was elected to Ecuador's National Assembly for the Citizen Revolution Movement in 2021. She was re-elected in 2023.

== Life ==
Mónica Palacios, is a woman that holds a bachelor of arts in economics, political science and history from Queens College, City University of New York.

In February 2021, she was a candidate for the Democratic Center and was elected to the National Assembly after the 2021 Ecuadorian general elections.

In November 2021, she was one of the eighty-one members of the Assembly who abstained during the vote for the Economic Reform Bill which would have brought in changes to the tax system.

In June 2022 she was among the members who requested a debate concerning the replacement of President Guillermo Lasso. Forty-six other members signed the request including Sofía Espín, Jhajaira Urresta, Patricia Mendoza, Victoria Desintonio, Viviana Veloz and Rosa Mayorga. Lasso brought in the constitution clause number 148 known as Mutual death in May 2023 when he knew that he was about to be impeached. This required all of the National Assembly members to stand for re-election. She stood for re-election and was re-elected to the National Assembly. She represents Ecuadorians living in the US and Canada. She is a member of the Permanent Commission on Food Sovereignty and Development of the Agricultural and Fishing Sector.

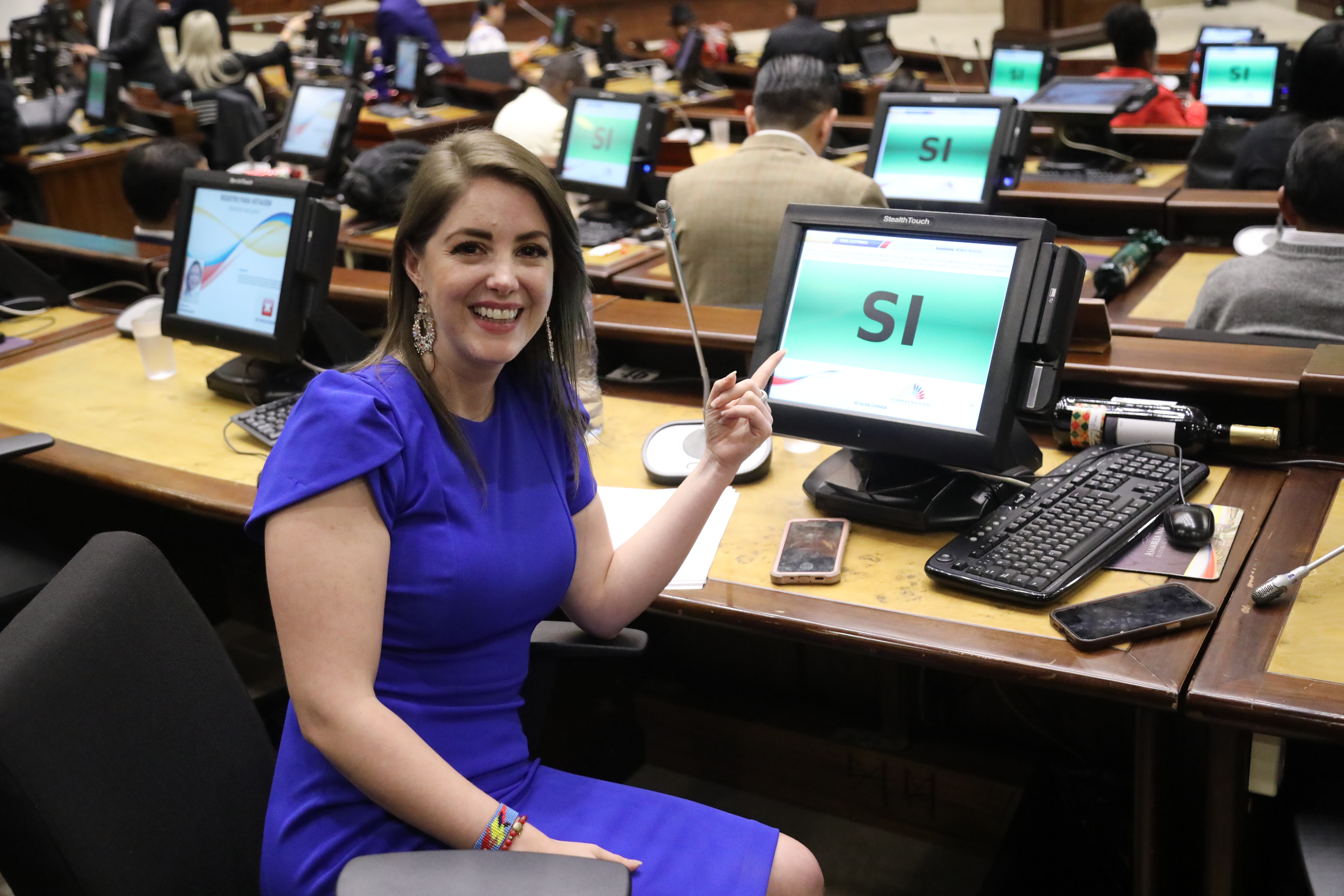
Mónica Palacios back in the assembly in 2023

In November 2022, she won a case for libel against Diego Ordoñez, security secretary.

Following her restoration to the assembly she was there when the ex-President returned to pass his presidential sash to his successor in November 2023. Palacios made the news when she shouted "Out Lasso Out" as he left. Lasso ignored the comment. Some felt that her comment was ill-timed but she defended her action as she saw him as a thief in a sash.

In October President Noboa made an allegation of slander concerning comments she had made four months before in Chone, Manabí where she mentioned that the rich of the country including Noboa were thieves. The judge, Mercedes Caicedo, however asked for advice from the National Assembly before continuing. President Noboa objected to what he said was an unnecessary step.

In November 2023 she was elected to assembly's commission on Sovereignty and Development of the Agricultural and Fisheries Sector. It was led by Jaminton Intriago and Marjorie Rosado as President and vice-president. The other members were Andrea Rivadeneira, Amy Gende, Patricia Núñez, Eduardo Mendoza, Viviana Zambrano and Roberto Cuero.

In May 2024, she is suspended for 60 days following a complaint for harassment of staff from another party. In September 2025, she is further suspended from her parliamentary office for 90 days for disrupting the parliamentary commission on biodiversity.
