= Sofía Espín =

Ecuadorian politician

Sofia Espín
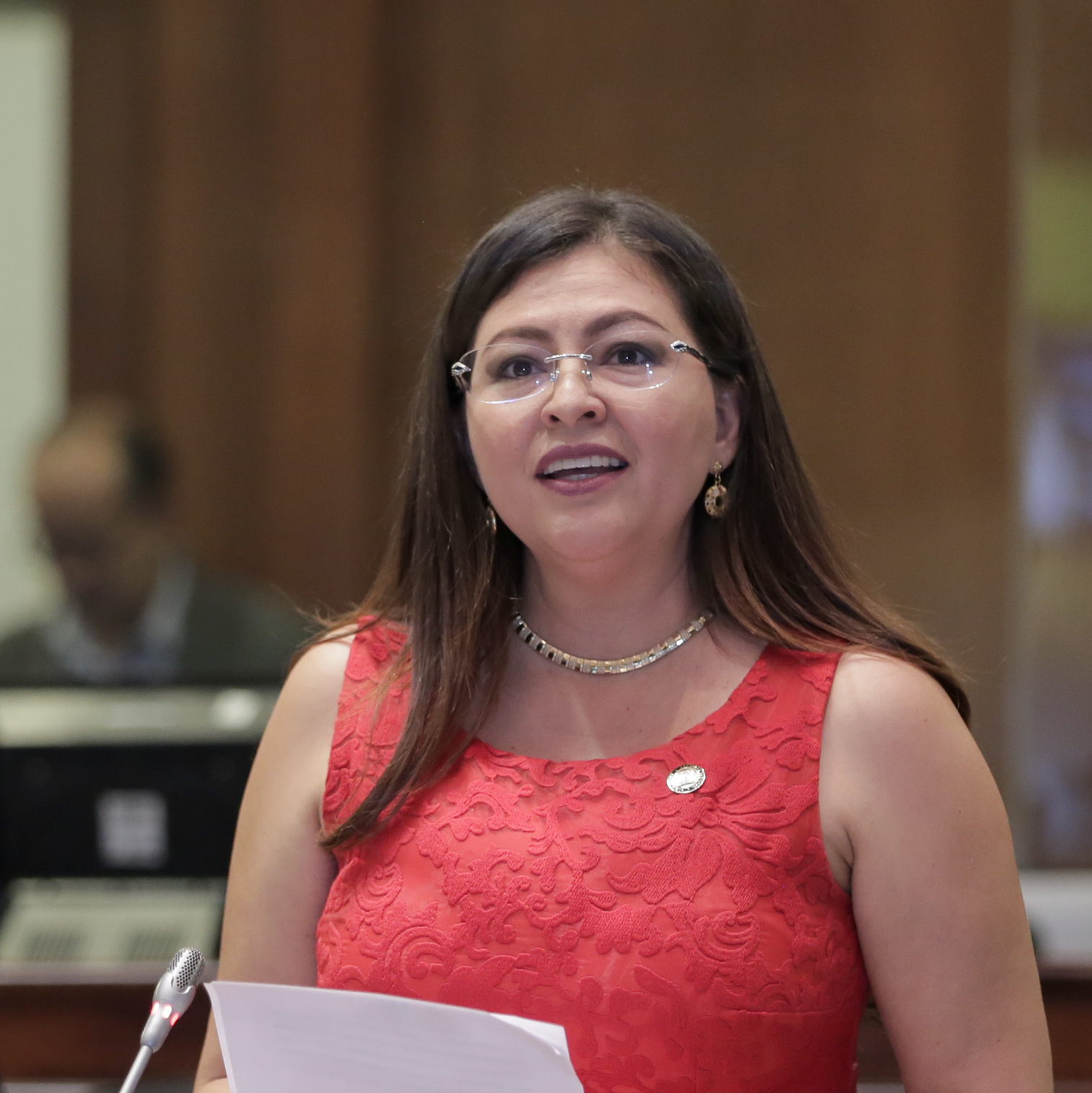
- in 2017
- Born: Sofía Eugenia Espín Reyes
- Occupation: Politician
- Known for: National Assembly member
- Political party: Citizen Revolution

Sofía Eugenia Espín Reyes is an Ecuadorian politician. After she was dismissed from the National Assembly she fled to Bolivia, where she applied for political asylum. Before this was resolved she was re-elected in May 2021. Espín was the president of the political coalition called Union for Hope.

== Life ==
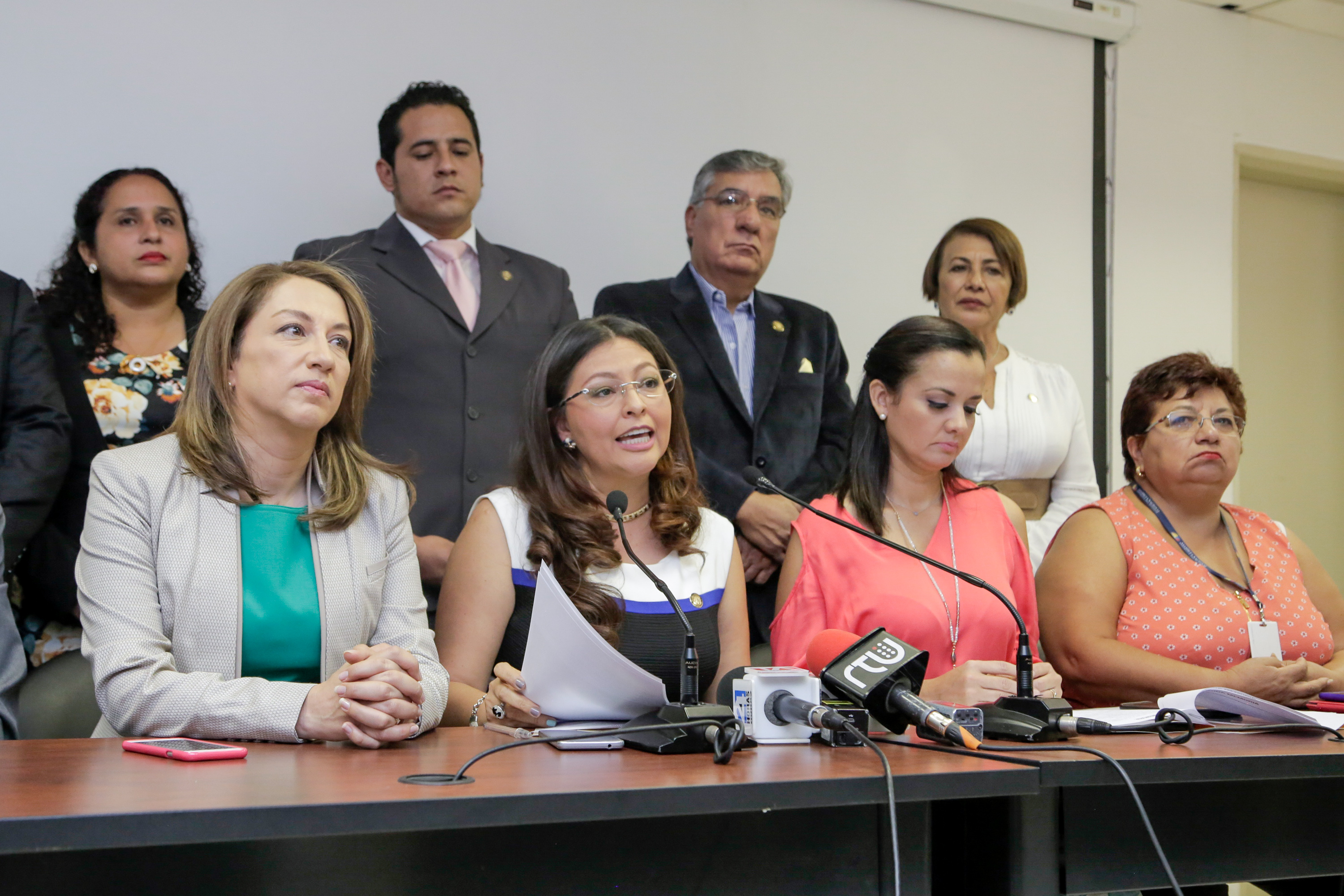
Press conference in September 2017

She was a delegate for the Citizen Revolution, but dismissed from the National Assembly in November 2018 with a majority of 94 votes. An investigation had noted that she visited Jessica Falcón, a person in prison who was involved with the kidnap of the politician Fernando Balda. This is an important case that involves the former President Rafael Correa. It was said that she and lawyer, Yadira Cadena, made an offer of legal assistance, money and political asylum, in Belgium, to Balda if she was willing to retract her evidence in the Balda case.

Former President Correa fled to Belgium where he applied for political asylum while resisting Ecuador's claims for his extradition.

Espín was required to present herself to the Provincial Court of Justice of Guayas every eight days, but before the end of 2018 she left the country for "health reasons".

In January 2019 she was in Bolivia with former head of communications Carlos Ochoa. They were described as "fugitives from justice" and they both applied for political asylum in February. They said that President Lenín Moreno's administration was persecuting the two of them, although the Ecuadorian government assured the Bolivians that they were common criminals and there was no political motivation. At the time the Bolivian government said that they would make a decision within four months, but a decision was never published.

In April 2020 she was said to be in exile with Correa in Mexico. She had travelled overland from Bolivia to Lima where she then caught a plane for Mexico in November.

Espín was re-elected to the National Assembly in 2021. She retook her seat on 14 May. She resigned from her position as president of Union for Hope (UNES) and was replaced by Paola Cabezas.

In November 2021 she was one of the politicians who abstained which allowed the Economic Development and Fiscal Sustainability Law to be passed. She also proposed, in the National Assembly, that 15 November should be set aside as a day to remember worker's struggle on the anniversary of the 1922 Guayaquil general strike and massacre.

In June 2022 she was among the members who requested a debate concerning the replacement of President Guillermo Lasso because of his alleged mismanagement. 46 other members signed the request including Vanessa Álava, Mónica Palacios, Jhajaira Urresta, Patricia Mendoza, Victoria Desintonio, Viviana Veloz and Rosa Mayorga.
