= Amy Gende =

Tsáchila Ecuadorian politician (born 1998)

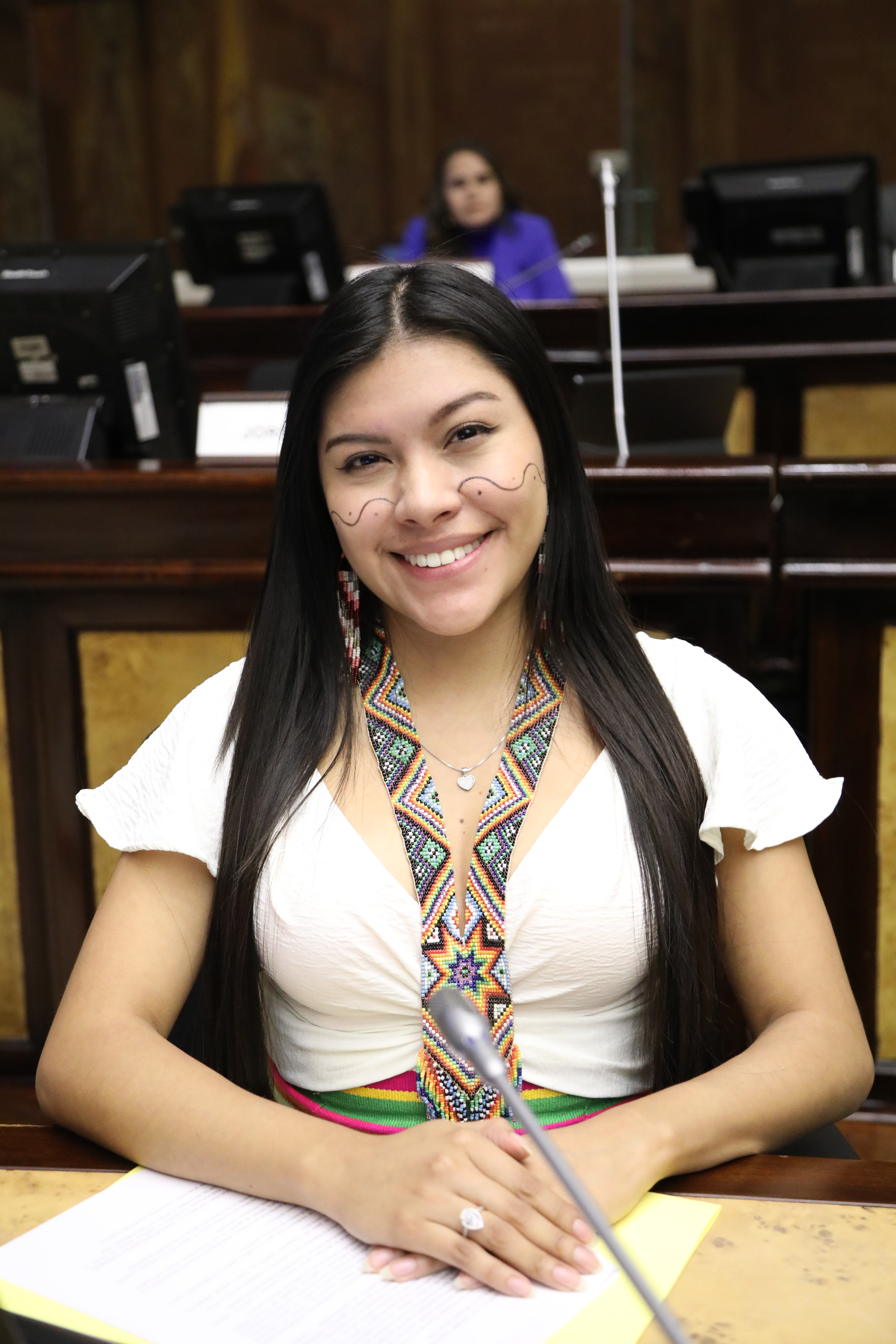
Amy Gende in National Assembly, 5 September 2024

Amy Gende Córdova (born 22 November 1998) is a Tsáchila Ecuadorian politician, member of the National Assembly between 2023 and 2025.

== Career ==
Gende was born on 22 November 1998 in Santo Domingo, Ecuador in a Tsáchila family.

She completed her primary and secondary education in 2017 at the Kasama Educational Unit in the province of Santo Domingo de los Tsáchilas. Thanks to a scholarship programme she was awarded, she obtained her Bachelor's Degree in International Relations from the Universidad San Francisco de Quito in 2022. She also studied for a Master's Degree in Political Philosophy and Economics at the University of the Americas (UDLA, Ecuador). She has been the president of the Tsáchila nationality in the Ethnic Diversity Programme at the University of San Francisco de Quito. Gende has been an intern at the Travel Documents and Legalisation Department of the Ministry of Foreign Affairs and Human Mobility.

Gende was elected member of the National Assembly in the 2023 general election on 20 August for Movimiento Construye representing Santo Domingo de los Tsáchilas Province. She was sworn in on 17 November 2023. In November 2023 she was elected to assembly's commission on Sovereignty and Development of the Agricultural and Fisheries Sector. It was led by Jaminton Intriago and Marjorie Rosado as President and vice-president. The other members were Andrea Rivadeneira, Mónica Palacios, Patricia Núñez, Eduardo Mendoza, Viviana Zambrano and Roberto Cuero. Gende was not re-elected in the 2025 general election.
