= Gissela Garzón =

Ecuadorian politician

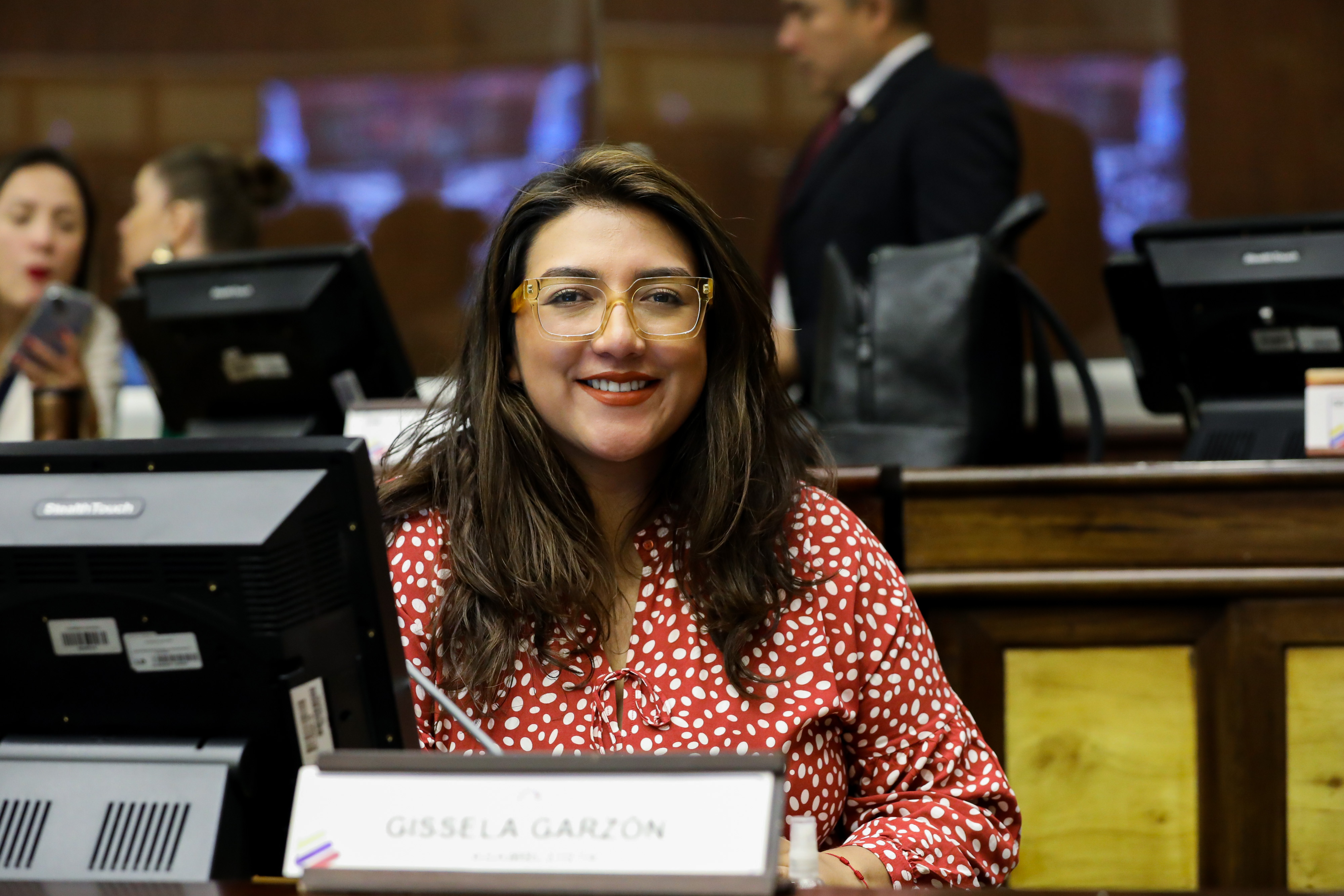
- in 2023
- Education: Latin American Faculty of Social Sciences
- Occupation: assembly member
- Political party: Citizen Revolution (RC)

Gissela Siomara Garzón Monteros is an Ecuadorian politician who is a National Assembly member in Ecuador.

== Life ==
Garzón's first degree is in Social Communication which she obtained at the Latin American Faculty of Social Sciences. She entered the National Assembly in 2015, but she was not elected, but working as an assistant having decided on a career in public service.

From 2021 to 2023 she was an Alternate Assemblywoman. She became an assembly member in July 2023.

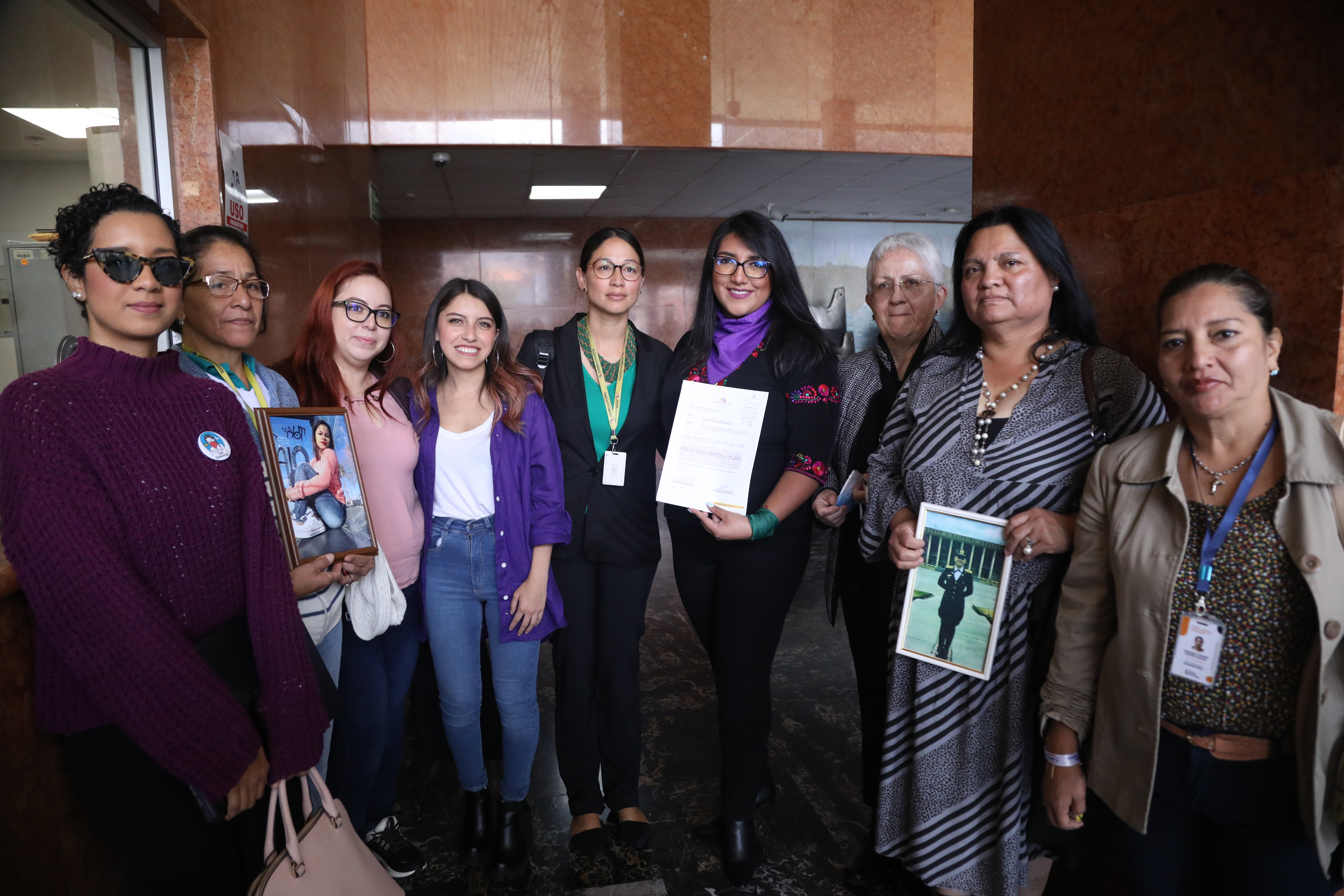
Jahiren Noriega and Garzón presenting draft legislation regarding femicide in October 2022

Garzón was the instigator of a case for the impeachment of Attorney General Diana Salazar in December 2023. The assembly later decided to put that case aside, in May 2024, because Salazar had a "high risk" pregnancy. However this was only a temporary delay and in July Garzón wrote to the National Assembly President Henry Kronfle to request that the impeachment proceedings should be re-scheduled for the Legislative Administration Council's next session. Also in July Salozar published her own accusations against Garzón. Salozar said that Garzón had broken confidentiality by sharing Salozar's medical details with the exiled ex-President Correa. Garzón said that she was not at the meeting where the details were discussed.

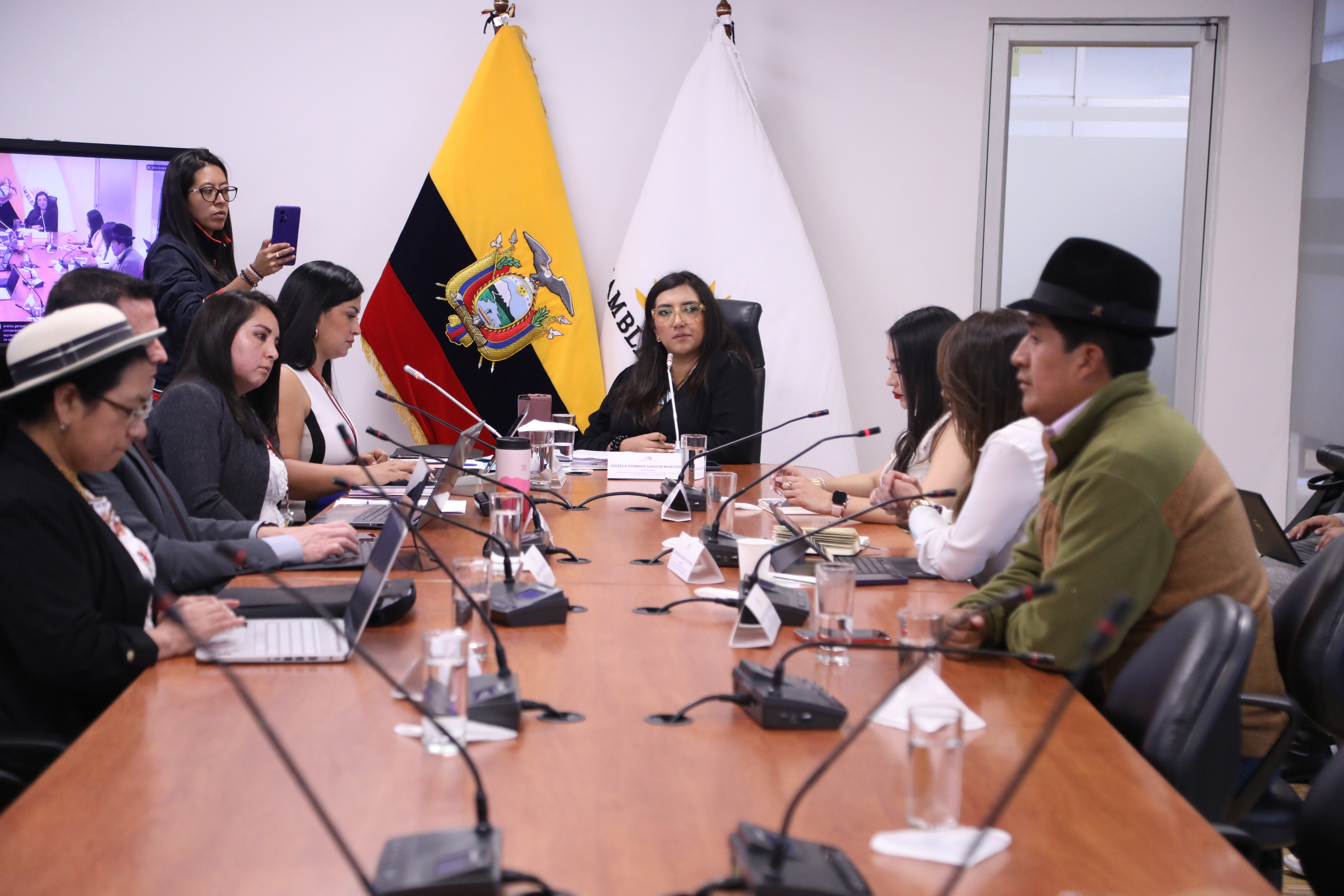
Gissela chairing a commission to look at constitutional change in December 2024

In 2024 Garzón spoke out against the proposed increase in VAT to 15% and she was broadly supportive of the President Daniel Noboa's "war on terrorism".

Garzón takes a lead role in looking at proposed changes to Ecuador's constitution after she was given the role by the Assembly President Viviana Veloz. One proposal was to change the constitution to allow more freedom in decisions that allow foreign military bases in Ecuador. She advised that there was insuffucuent time in November 2024 and that this matter would need to wait until the next assembly.
