= Mariuxi Sánchez =

Ecuadorian politician (1982–2025)

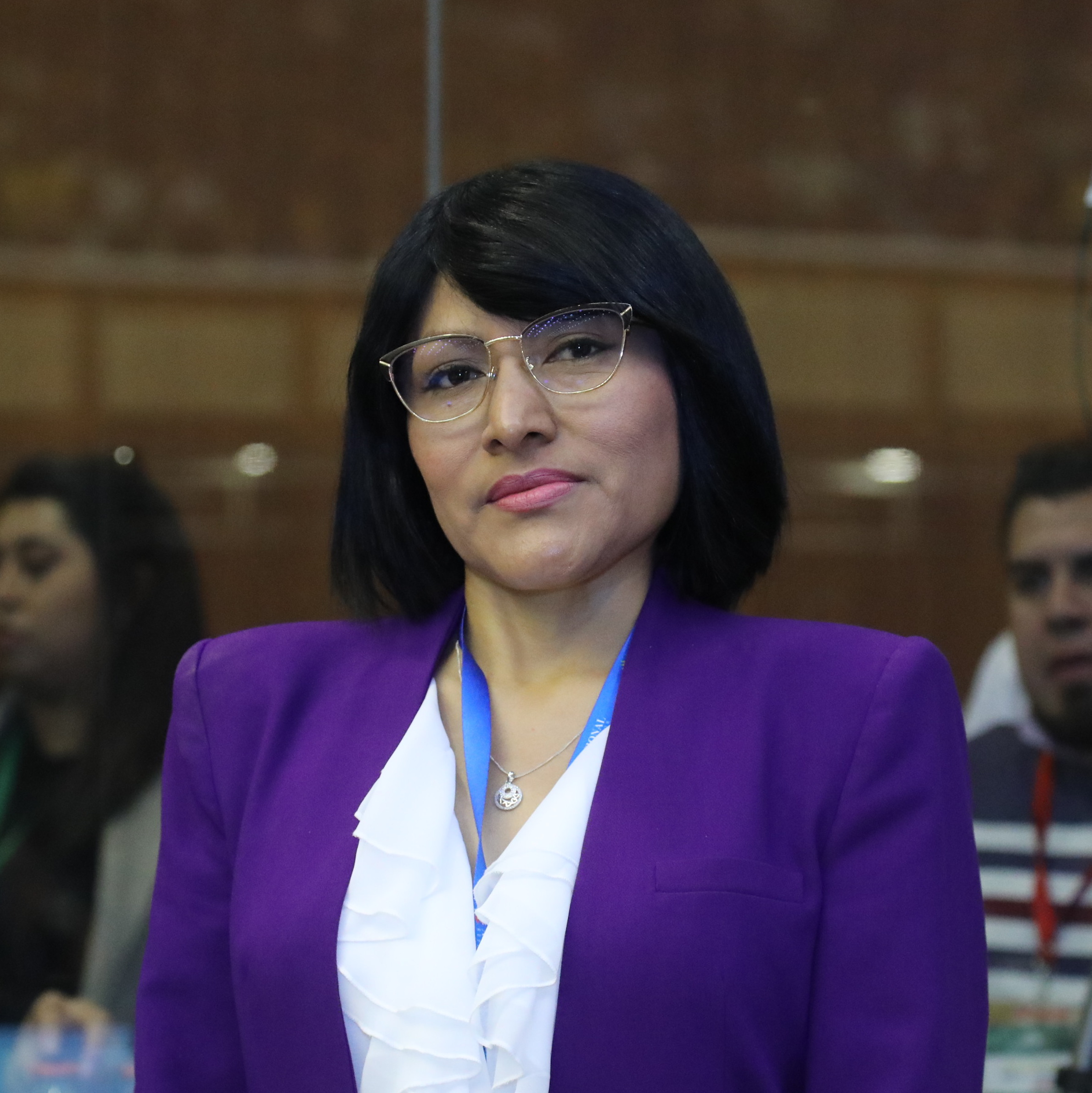
- Sánchez in 2023

Member of the National Assembly
- In office 14 May 2021 – 24 August 2025
- Constituency: Orellana

Personal details
- Born: 1981 or 1982
- Died: 24 August 2025 (aged 43) Quito, Ecuador
- Party: Citizen Revolution Movement
- Other political affiliations: Union for Hope
- Education: Amazon Polytechnic School; Pontifical Catholic University of Ecuador

Mariuxi Cleopatra Sánchez Sarango (1981 or 1982 – 24 August 2025) was an Ecuadorian politician who became a member of the National Assembly in 2021. During her tenure, she raised concerns about oil pollution in Ecuador, particularly regarding Texaco-Chevron.

== Life and career ==
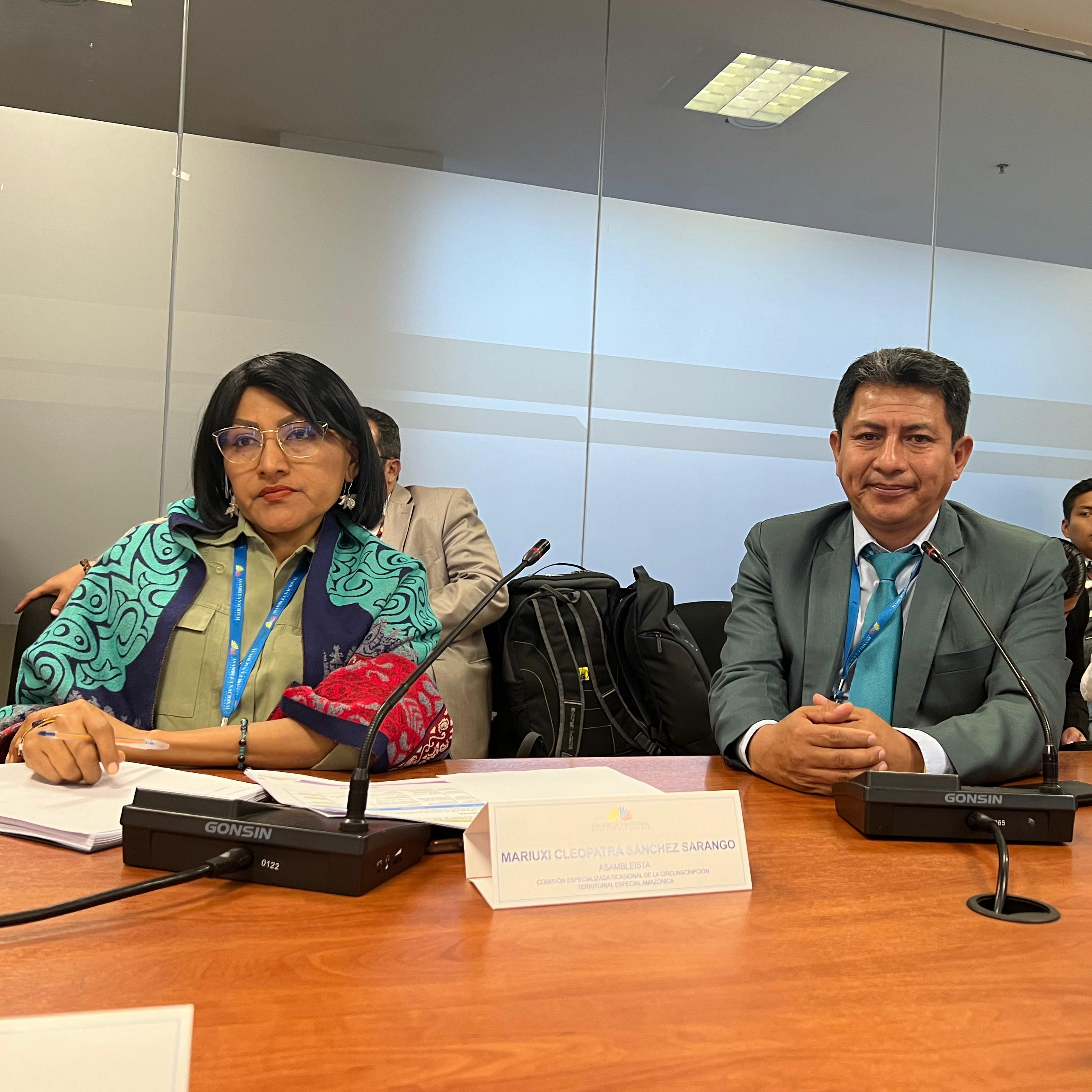
Mariuxi Sanchez and Roberto Cerda in 2024

Sánchez attended the Amazon Polytechnic School, where she received a degree in ecotourism business engineering. She later attended the Pontifical Catholic University of Ecuador, where she received a master's degree in community local development management.

Prior to her political career, Sánchez worked as the technical and logistics coordinator for the canton of Francisco de Orellana. She also worked for the Ministry of Energy and the Ministry of the Interior. She served on the Francisco de Orellana cantonal council from 2014 until 2019.

Sánchez was concerned about the damage caused by Texaco-Chevron in Ecuador. In 2012, she witnessed a waste pit nearly a kilometre long, where a local woman told her she had lost four relatives to cancer. She was elected to the National Assembly in May 2021 to represent Orellana Province during the fourth legislative period.

After her election, Sánchez became a member of the Permanent Commission of Education, Culture, Science, Technology, Innovation and Ancestral Knowledge, alongside Ana María Raffo, Isabel Enriquez and Zolanda Pluas.

Sánchez was a member of the Unión por la Esperanza (UNES) alliance. On 9 March 2022, a vote was held to remove Assembly president Guadalupe Llori; Sánchez was absent, and the motion failed. She was one of the 80 members of the assembly who voted to impeach Guillermo Lasso. As a result, Lasso resigned using a "cross-death" clause in the constitution which required all the members of the assembly to resign as well.

Sánchez later joined the Permanent Commission on Biodiversity and Natural Resources with Sofia Sanchez. She continued to express concern about oil pollution and the lack of political will to hold companies accountable. Texaco-Chevron had been fined nine billion dollars, but the judgment had not been paid. In 2024, she and Roberto Cerda became vice president and president, respectively, of the Occasional Specialized Commission of the Amazonian Constituency.

Sánchez died on 24 August 2025, at the age of 43, after a prolonged battle with cancer.
