= Zolanda Pluas =

Ecuadorian politician

Zolanda Plúas
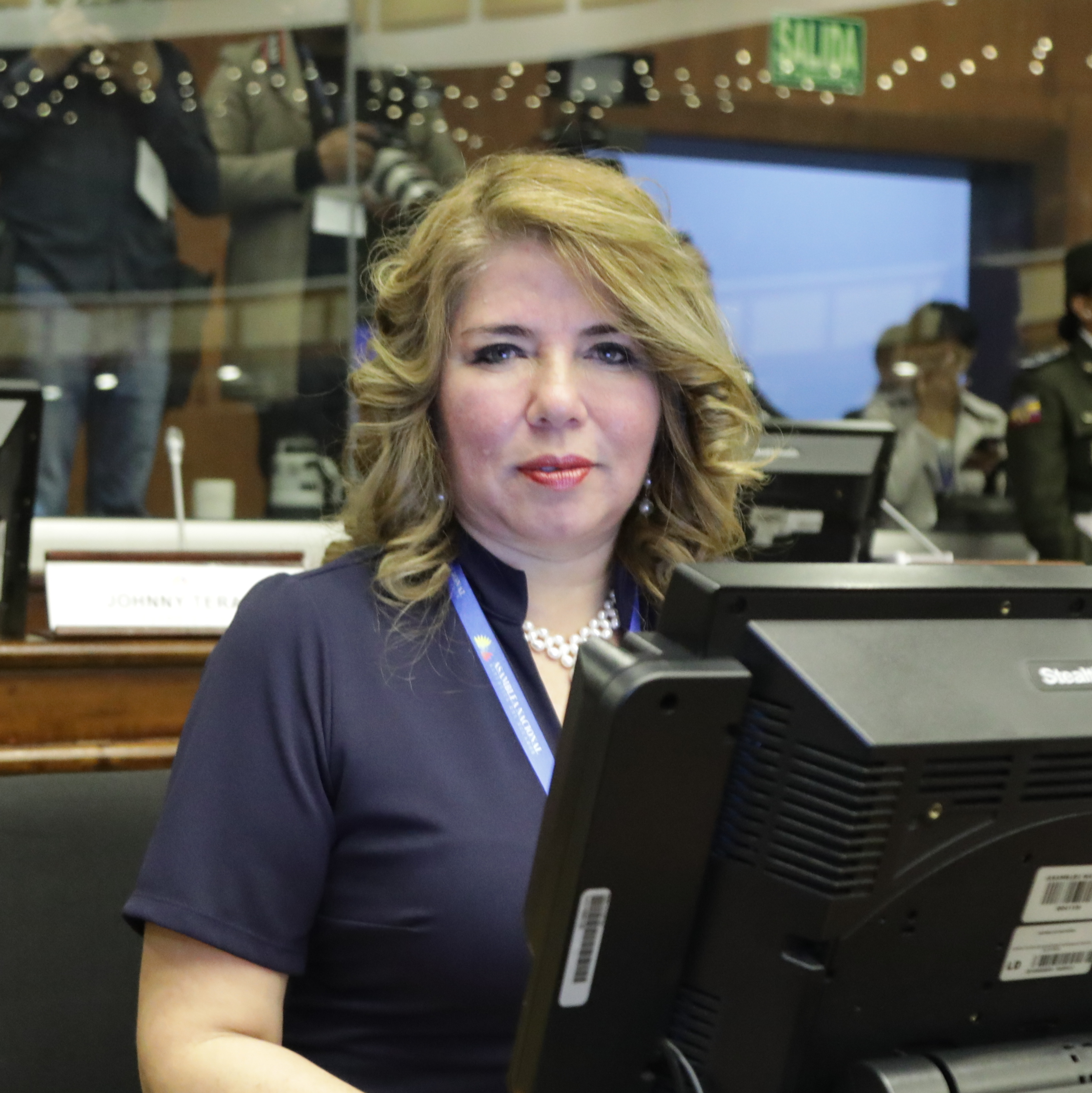
- in November 2023
- Occupation: politician
- Political party: PSC

Nelly Zolanda Plúas Arias is an Ecuadorian politician and a member of Ecuador's Social Christian Party (PSC) and from 2021 a member of the National Assembly.

== Life ==
Nelly Zolanda Plúas Arias has several university degrees including a doctorate and she was a professor in 2015 at the University of Guayaquil until she became a member of the National Assembly in 2021. Her substitute was Alvarado López Edson Cristobal. She represents the Province of Guayas District 4.

She is a member of the Permanent Commission of Education, Culture, Science, Technology, Innovation and Ancestral Knowledge after she was elected in May 2020. Other members of that commission include Ana Raffo, Mariuxi Sanchez and Isabel Enriquez.

In December 2022 she was backing the assembly's resolution to create a new area of national heritage around the archeological site and river island of La Tolita (La_Tolita_(Sitio_arqueológico)).

The President of Ecuador Guillermo Lasso brought in an unusual constitution clause (number 148) known as Mutual death in May 2023 when he knew that he was about to be impeached. This required all of the National Assembly members to stand for re-election. Following her restoration to the assembly she was voted in as the President of the Assembly's Commission into Education, Culture, Science, Technology, Innovation and Ancestral Knowledge. The other members were Mauricio Zambrano, Jahiren Noriega, Ana María Raffo, Nathaly Morillo, Dallyana Passailaigue, Cecilia Baltazar, Hernán Zapata and Juan Carlos Camacho.

In 2023, she and the Mayor of Daule, Wilson Cañizares, met with the Rector of the University of Guayaquil, Francisco Moran, to plan a Support Center in Daule.
