= Isabel Enríquez (politician) =

Ecuador academic and politician

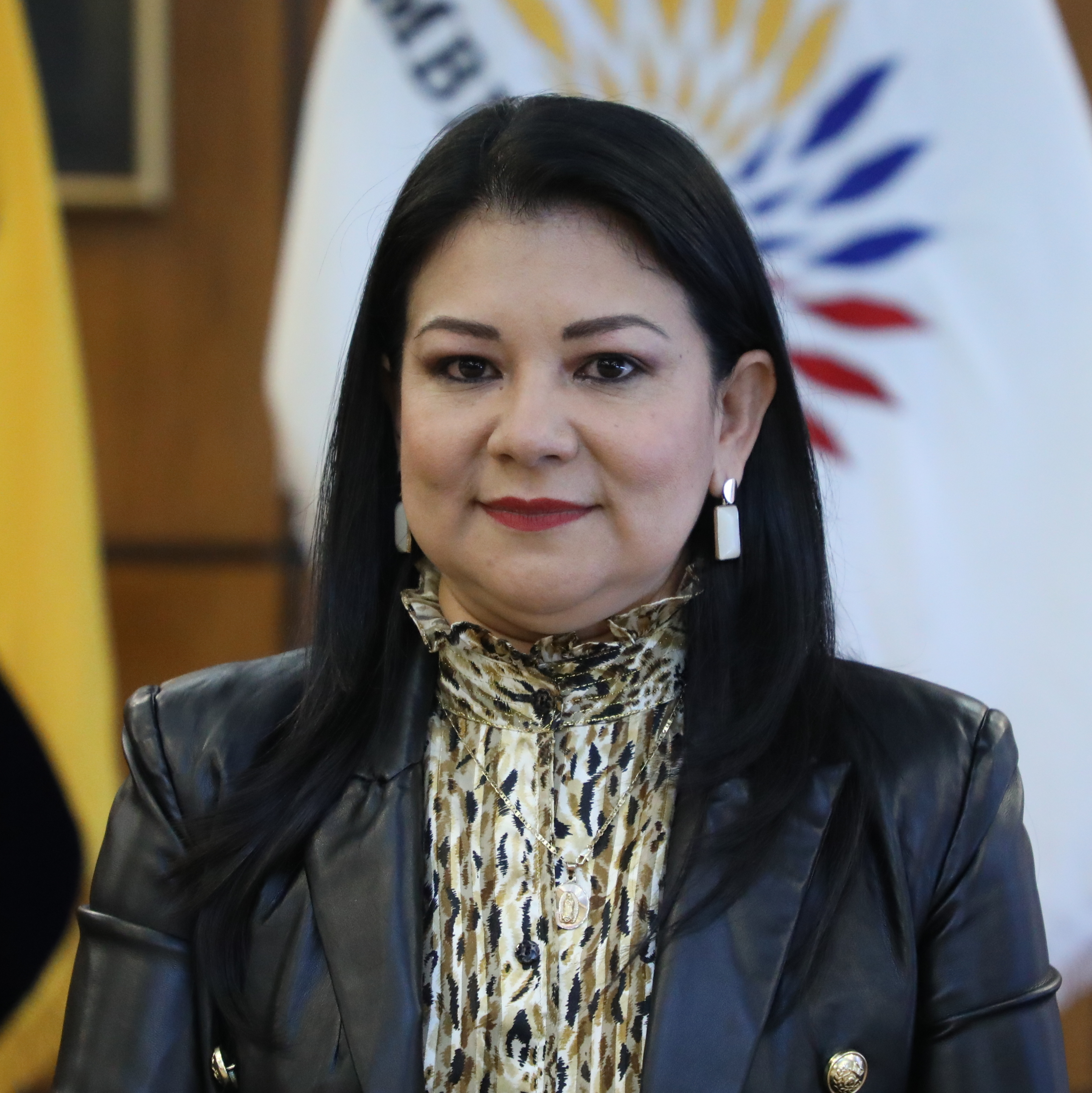
- Enriquez in 2022
- Political party: Pachakutik Plurinational Unity Movement – New Country

Isabel Maria Enriquez Jaya is an Ecuadorian academic and politician who was a member of National Assembly of Ecuador, representing the Zamora-Chinchipe Province, from 2021 to 2023. She is a member of the Pachakutik Plurinational Unity Movement – New Country.

== Life ==
Enriquez has a degree in Social Communication and she lectured at the National University of Loja in 2015/2016. She also worked at the National University of Education UNAE in Canar Province in 2019/2020 before she stood for election.

She was elected to be a member of the fourth legislative period of the National Assembly of Ecuador on 21 May 2021. She represents the province of Zamora Chinchipe as a member of the Pachakutik Plurinational Unity Movement – New Country.

Enriquez became a member of the Permanent Commission of Education, Culture, Science, Technology, Innovation and Ancestral Knowledge after she was elected in 2021. Other members of that commission include Ana Raffo, Mariuxi Sanchez and Zolanda Pluas.

In August 2022 Enriquez was elected to chair the Constitutional Amendments Commission succeeding Esteban Torres. The commission concerns itself with expediating constitutional amendments. For instance the constitution of Ecuador puts limits on the ways that the country's police can cooperate with the military. President Guillermo Lasso has proposed that these limits should be relaxed. The Constitutional Amendments Commission looked at how this might be achieved. Enriquez is keen to ensure that they do make these types of changes in a responsible and transparent way.

Enriquez lost her seat in the assembly when all the members were resigned as a result of a Presidential decree known as cross-death in 2023. In the following elections, Enríquez and Diego Esparza Aguirre were replaced by Andrea Rivadeneira and Héctor Valladarles to represent Zamora Chinchipe.
