= Diana Salazar (jurist) =

Ecuadorian jurist and lawyer

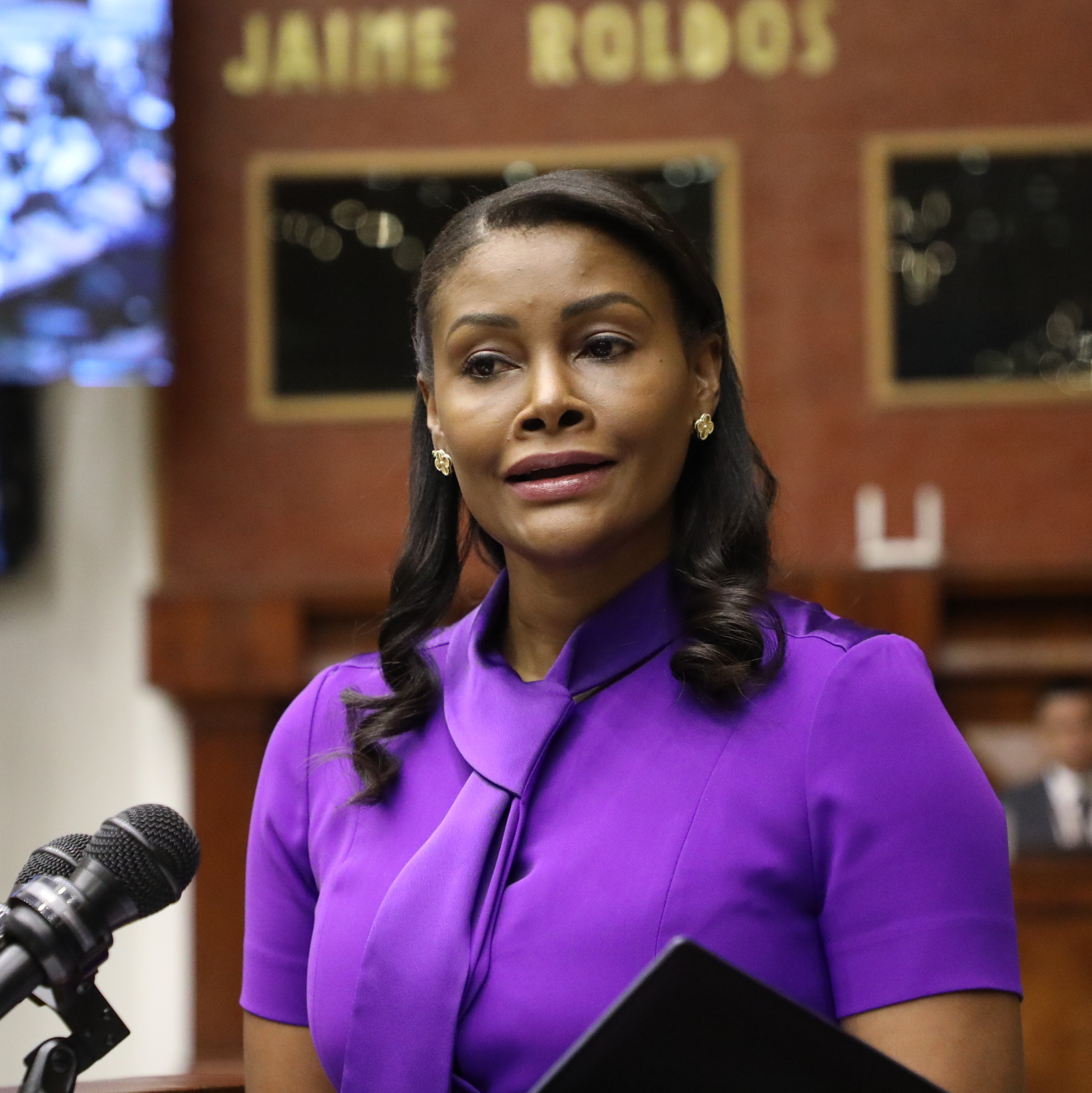
- Salazar in January 2024

Attorney General of Ecuador
- In office 8 April 2019 – 20 May 2024
- Preceded by: Ruth Palacios Brito

Personal details
- Born: June 5, 1981 (age 45) Ibarra, Ecuador
- Education: Central University of Ecuador; Simón Bolívar Andean University; University of Castilla–La Mancha; Universidad Tecnológica Indoamérica
- Occupation: Jurist, lawyer, prosecutor
- Website: Official website; Twitter

Diana Salazar Méndez (born 5 June 1981, Ibarra, Ecuador) is an Ecuadorian jurist and lawyer, and the former Attorney-General of Ecuador. She was said to be leading the country's fight against "narcopolitics" in January 2024, and was described as "Ecuador's iron lady" in February 2025.

== Early life and education ==
Salazar spent her childhood in her native Ibarra, moving to Quito at age 16 with family. She was raised solely by her mother Olivia Méndez, an educational psychologist, along with three siblings.

She is of Afro-Ecuadorian descent. Salazar has a degree in Political and Social Sciences from the Central University of Ecuador. She also has a master's degree in Procedural Law from the Indoamérica Technological University.

== Career ==
In 2001, at the age of 20, she began working in the Pichincha Prosecutor's Office as an assistant prosecutor, while still studying at the Central University Law School. In 2006 she was promoted as a secretary in the office, and in 2011 she became a prosecutor for the south of the capital.

As prosecutor, Salazar investigated the 2015 FIFA corruption case, in which the ex-president of the Ecuadorian Football Federation Luis Chiriboga was arrested. She later chaired the Financial and Economic Analysis Unit, and directed investigations into corruption, such as then Vice President Jorge Glas's involvement in the Odebrecht scandal.

Diana Salazar was appointed unanimously as the Attorney General of Ecuador by the transitionary Council for Citizen Participation and Social Control on 1 April 2019. She was the first black woman to hold the position.

In December 2023, she led operation Metastasis which led to the arrest of the president of the Judiciary and another police senior figure for organized crime and drug trafficking. There were 30 arrests and 75 raids. She was said to be leading the country's fight against "narcopolitics" in January 2024 because politicians and judges were collaborating with drug gangs. This was during events was when a national TV station's live programme was taken over at gun point and one of the country's most notorious criminals, José Adolfo Macías Villamar went missing from prison.

In 2024, Time magazine described her work as some of the most challenging and risky in the Western Hemisphere, naming her to their annual list of 100 most influential people.

There has been at least three attempts to impeach her. On 16 May 2024 she said that she was pregnant with her second child. The next day the Legislative Administrative Council resolved to suspend another attempt to have her impeached until February 2025. Salazar had argued that she had a right to have her pregnancy in peace. There are seven member of the Legislative Administrative Council. Five of them agreed with her and two, Esther Cuesta and Viviana Veloz, abstained.

In July 2024, Salazar published her own accusations against Gissela Garzón who had instigated a demand for impeachment. Salazar said that Garzón had broken confidentiality by sharing Salazar's medical details with the exiled ex-President Correa. Garzón said that she was not at the meeting where the details were discussed.

Salazar accused Priscila Schettini of racial and gender based insults and Scettini was prevented from taking her place in the National Assembly. After ten months, in May 2025, the ten-month long dispute and the resulting case against Schettini was referred to the full body of the Electoral Disputes Tribunal.

| Preceded by Ruth Palacios Brito | Attorney General of Ecuador; 8 April 2019 – present | Incumbent |
