= Jahiren Noriega =

Ecuadorian politician and sociologist

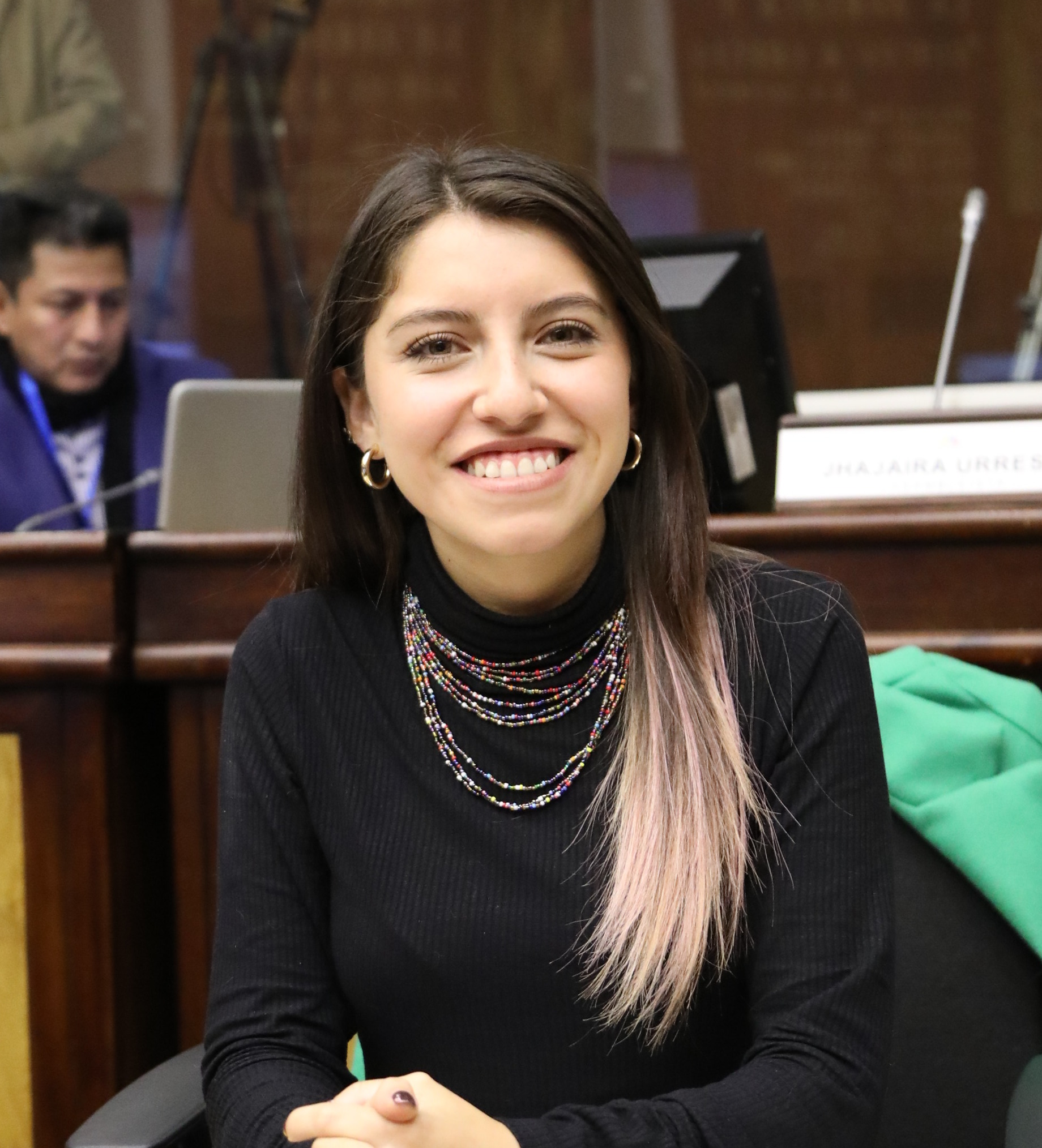
- Noriega in 2023

Personal details
- Born: 1997 (age 28–29)
- Party: Citizen Revolution Movement
- Education: Central University of Ecuador
- Occupation: Politician
- Known for: student leader, member of the National assembly

Jahiren Elizabeth Noriega Donoso (born 1997) is an Ecuadorian politician and sociologist. She was elected to the National Assembly in 2022 and re-elected in 2023, as a member of the Citizen Revolution Movement. In 2023, she was Ecuador's youngest legislator.

== Education ==
Noriega completed her secondary education at the Sebastián de Benalcazar Municipal School, where in November 2014, she was elected president of the student council. However, the campus authorities tried to prevent her from taking office because there had been no election regulations. Noriega filed a protection action against the school, which was ruled in her favor. Her case was supported by education minister Augusto Espinosa. Noriega was finally sworn in on February 3, 2015, and the Ministry of Education sanctioned the school's principal for her actions in the dispute.

She went on to study at the Central University of Ecuador, where she majored in sociology. There, she was politically active in arguing against cuts in the education budget made by Ecuadorian president Lenín Moreno.

== National political career ==
She was chosen to be a candidate for the National Assembly even though she was in her 20s. Noriega argued that this was the way to engage Ecuador's younger generation in politics.

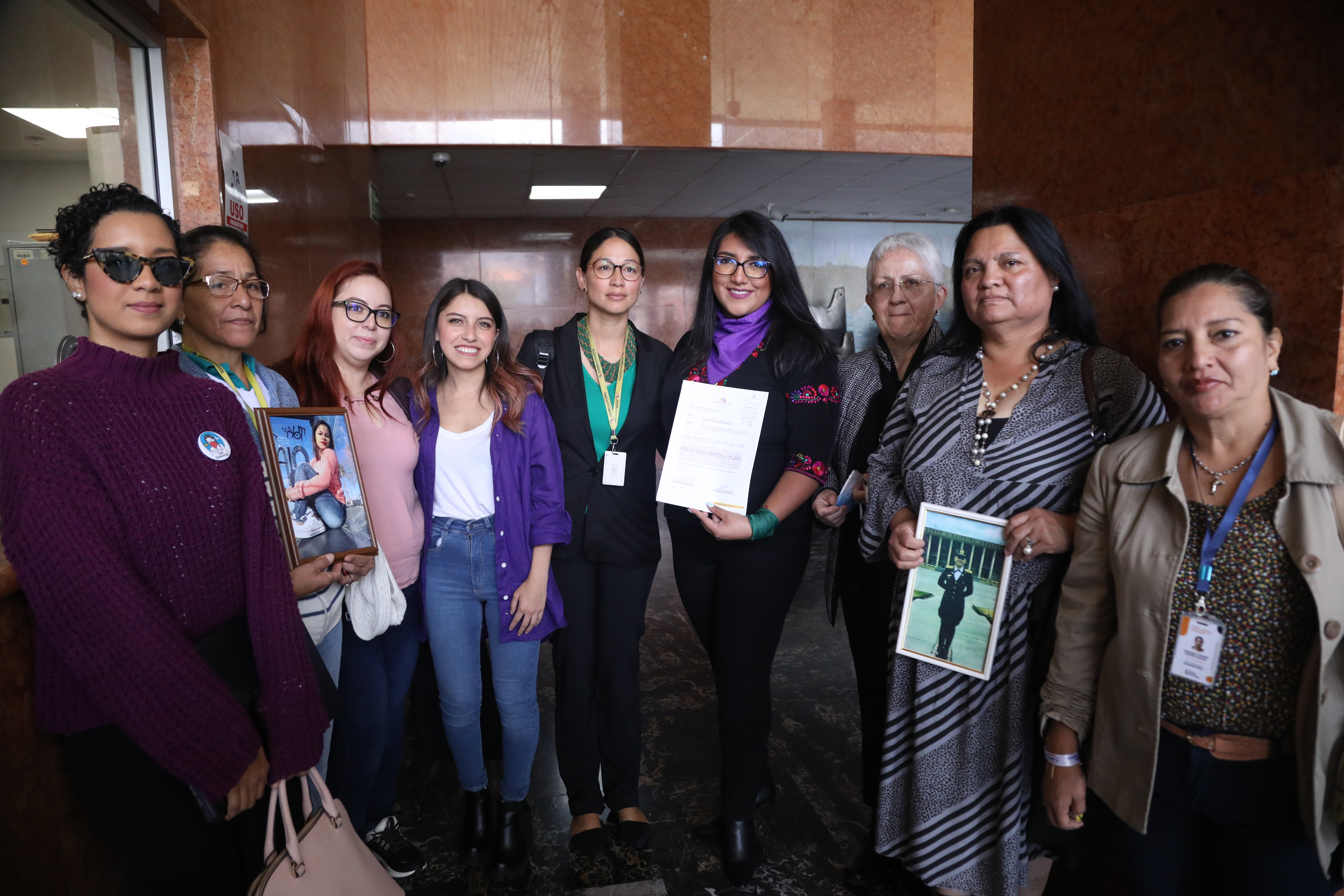
Jahiren Noriega and Gissela Garzon presenting draft legislation regarding femicide in October 2022

On 12 September 2022 she was one of two openly LGBT politicians (the other was Walter Gómez Ronquillo) to take office as National Assembly members after the resignation of Alexandra Arce and Pabel Muñoz. She represented the province of Pichincha for the Union for Hope and served on the Permanent Commission on the Economic and Tax Regime.

Noriega lost her seat, together with every other member of the assembly, following the actions of the President. She was re-elected to the National Assembly following the snap 2023 Ecuadorian general election, and was elected to be a member of the Permanent Commission of Education, Culture, Science, Technology, Innovation and Ancestral Knowledge. The other members were Mauricio Zambrano, Cecilia Baltazar, Zolanda Pluas, Nathaly Morillo, Dallyana Passailaigue, Ana María Raffo, Hernán Zapata and Juan Carlos Camacho.

While in office, Noriega has pushed for the decriminalization of abortion in cases of rape.

Noriega argued with Esteban Bernal for action about the cases of children whose mothers are killed by femicide. According to the law they are entitled to comprensation but only 13% of the eligible cases she identifies have received compensation.

Noriega was re-elected to the National Assembly and she was chosen in 2025 to join the National Assembly's Commission on Sovereignty, Integration and Comprehensive Security. It was led by Inés Alarcón and other members included Jhajaira Urresta, Mariana Yumbay, Camila Anahi Cueva Toro and Gema Karolina Dueñas Palma. They will serve until 2027.

== Personal life ==
Noriega is openly bisexual.
