= 1922 Guayaquil general strike =

Labor dispute in Ecuador

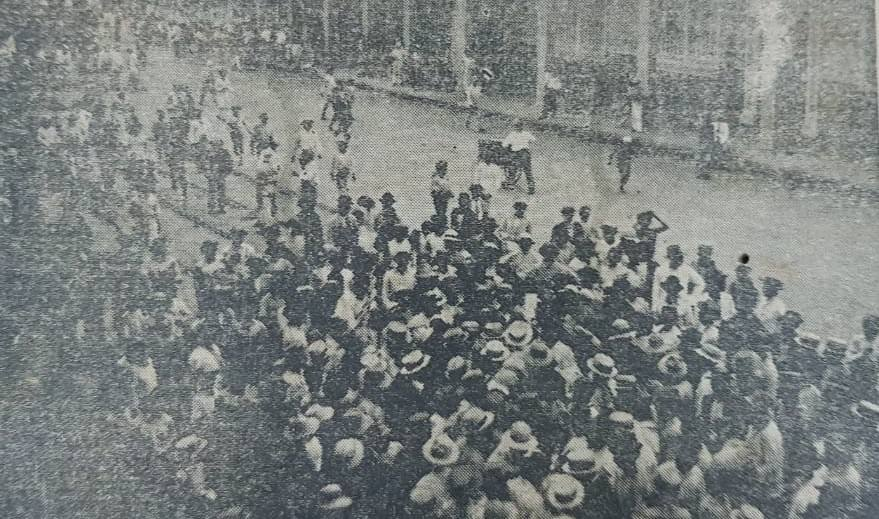
Workers marching in Guayaquil, 12 November 1922

The 1922 Guayaquil general strike was a three-day general work stoppage in the city of Guayaquil, Ecuador, which lasted from 13 to 15 November of that year. The strike began with trolley, electric company and other public utility workers who were inspired by a successful strike by railroad workers in nearby Durán. Workers made demands such as pay increases, shorter hours, safer working conditions, and government control of foreign currency exchange rates.

The government of Ecuador called on the military to suppress the strike. On 15 November 1922, police and military killed at least 300 strikers. Most workers returned to their jobs shortly afterwards. The trolley workers continued their strike until 21 November, when most of their demands were met.

== Background ==
In the early 1920s, Ecuador suffered an economic crisis due to a drop in the global price of the cocoa bean, which was the main export of the country. Guayaquil had experienced rapid economic growth in the late nineteenth and early twentieth century due to its location in the Guayas River basin—a region with near-ideal conditions for growing cocoa. At the beginning of the twentieth century, cocoa accounted for 75% of the country's total exports.

Following World War I, the price of the cocoa bean fell as countries such as Ghana, São Tomé, and Brazil began growing the crop. As cocoa sales declined, a lack of foreign currency in Ecuador led to severe inflation. In 1914, the Ecuadorian government passed the "Ley Moratoria," which froze exchange rates and allowed banks to issue currency not backed by gold or silver. This worsened the country's inflation, which was most felt by the working class. By 1922, the country had entered a state of public unrest.

== Strike ==
On 19 October 1922, Guayaquil and Quito Railway Company workers began a strike. The workers based in the town of Durán, across the river from Guayaquil made relatively modest demands such as the payment of wages on time, the establishment of medical auxiliary posts, payment in United States dollars or gold rather than the Sucre, fifteen days notice before lay-offs and the re-hiring of fired union organizers. The railroad company quickly negotiated an end to the strike, granting most of the workers' demands. The company planned to offset increased wages by raising fares on the trains, but rate hikes were cancelled by president José Luis Tamayo.

Workers in Guayaquil took note of the successes of the railway workers in Durán. Trolley, electric company and other public utility workers met in early November and came up with a list of demands including pay increases, an eight-hour workday, overtime pay, and compliance with safety regulations. When the demands were rejected, the workers struck.

The strike gained momentum as factories in the city were unable to operate due to lack of electricity. As negotiations neared completion, the strikers made new demands, such as artificial exchange rate controls by the government in order to prop up the value of the Sucre. By 13 November, the strike had grown into a citywide general strike.

=== Massacre ===
On 15 November, the government came to an agreement with union leaders on the exchange rate. That same day, a crowd of 20,000 people—the largest demonstration of the strike yet—assembled in downtown Guayaquil. Upon hearing that two labor leaders who had been jailed were to be released, the crowd marched to the police station. When the demonstrators arrived at the police station, soldiers began firing into the crowd.

The crowd began to flee, and were pursued by the troops. Many of the demonstrators were shot to death or stabbed by bayonets. Order was restored at around 6 pm. At least 300 people had been killed, although the precise number is unknown. No soldiers or police were killed, although several were injured.

== Aftermath ==
The general strike ended shortly after the massacre of 15 November. The following day, president Tamayo signaled that he would sign the exchange rate moratorium that had been demanded by the strikers. Most workers returned to their jobs, but the trolley workers continued their strike. On 21 November, the trolley worker strike was finally resolved, with the trolley workers receiving pay raises, shorter hours, and other demands. However, the trolley company would also increase fares. Sofia Espin proposed in 2021 in the National Assembly that 15 November should be set aside as a day to remember the massacre.
