= Lucía Pozo =

Ecaudorian National Assembly member

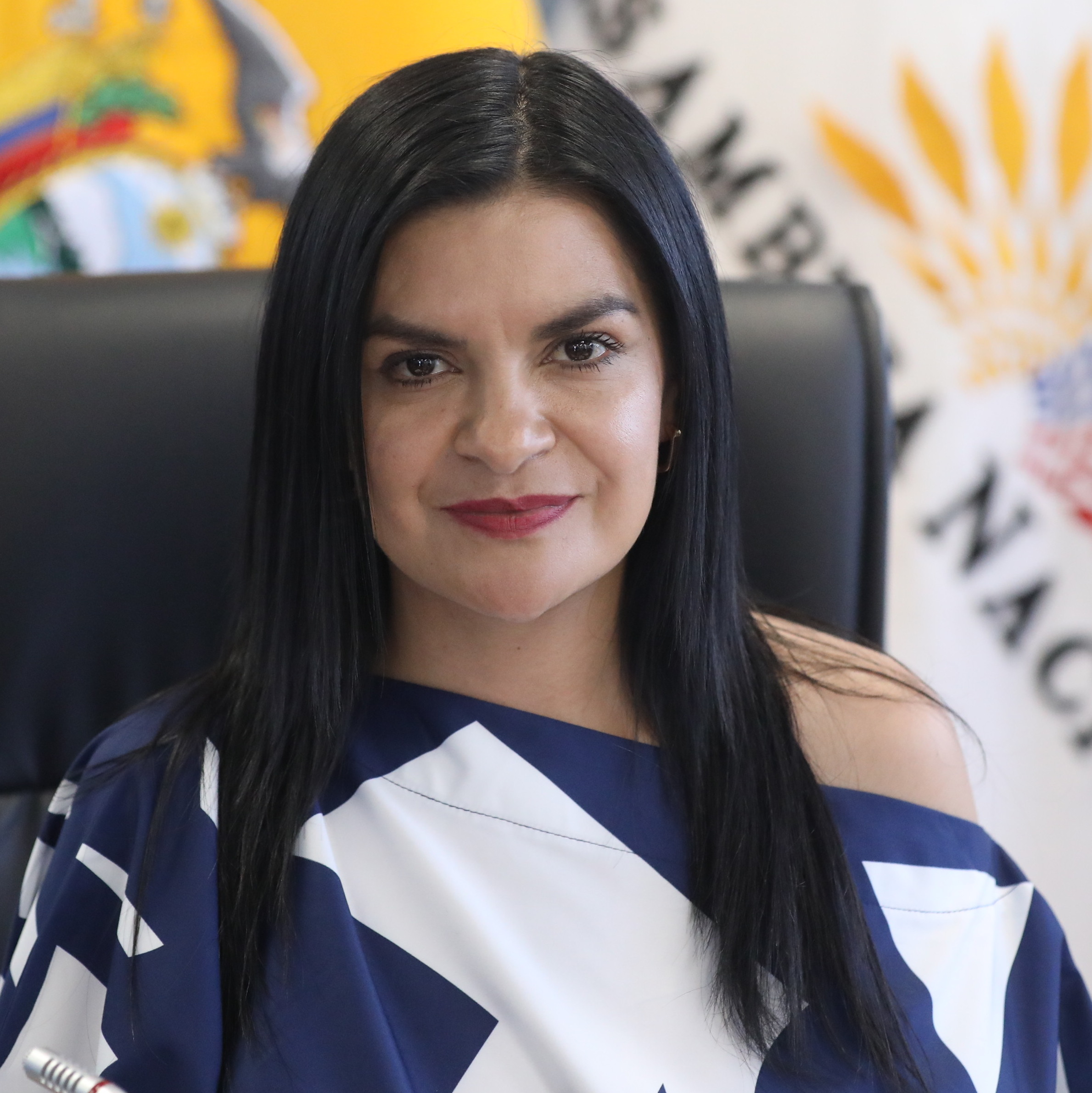
- in September 2025
- Known for: Governor and member of the National Assembly for the Carchi Province
- Political party: National Democratic Action

Brígida Lucía Pozo Moreta is an Ecuadorian politician who was elected to Ecuador's National Assembly for the governing party, National Democratic Action in February 2025 following the 2025 Ecuadorian general election. She is a member of the National Assembly for the Carchi Province.

== Life ==
Pozo was governor of the Carchi Province and the regional leader of the National Democratic Action.

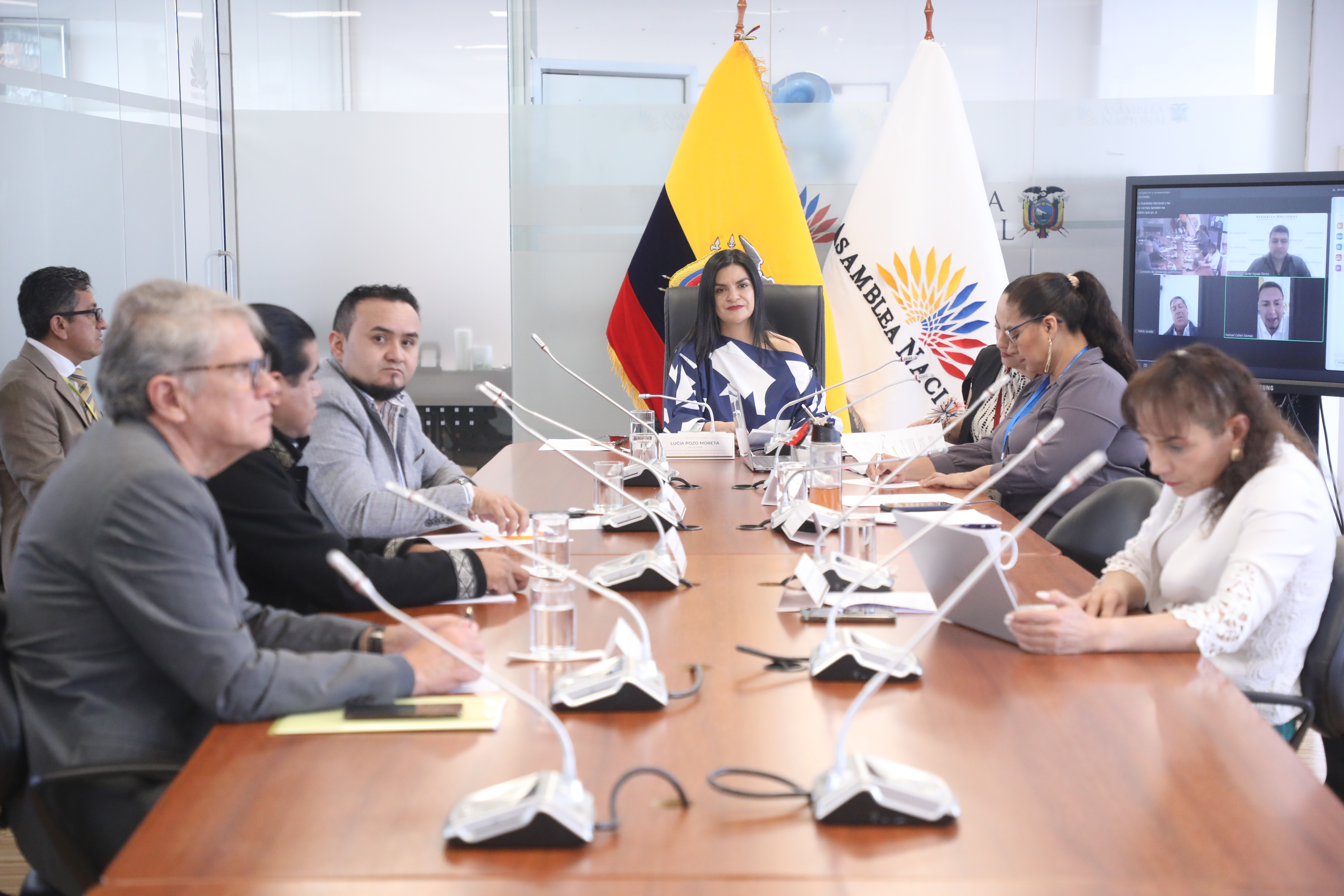
Pozo presiding a Committee's meeting, 5 September 2025

In June 2025, she was fined for not attending a plenary session.

In August 2025, she supports a reform to prevent political parties to be funded by the state.

She leads the Commission of Autonomous Governments, Decentralization, Competencies and Territorial Organizations. The other commissioners include Sandra Elizabeth Figueroa Aguilar and Silvia Patricia Nuñez Ramos. In November 2025, she led a reform to change the local authority structure.
