= Vanessa Álava =

Ecuadorian politician (born 1982)

María Vanessa Álava
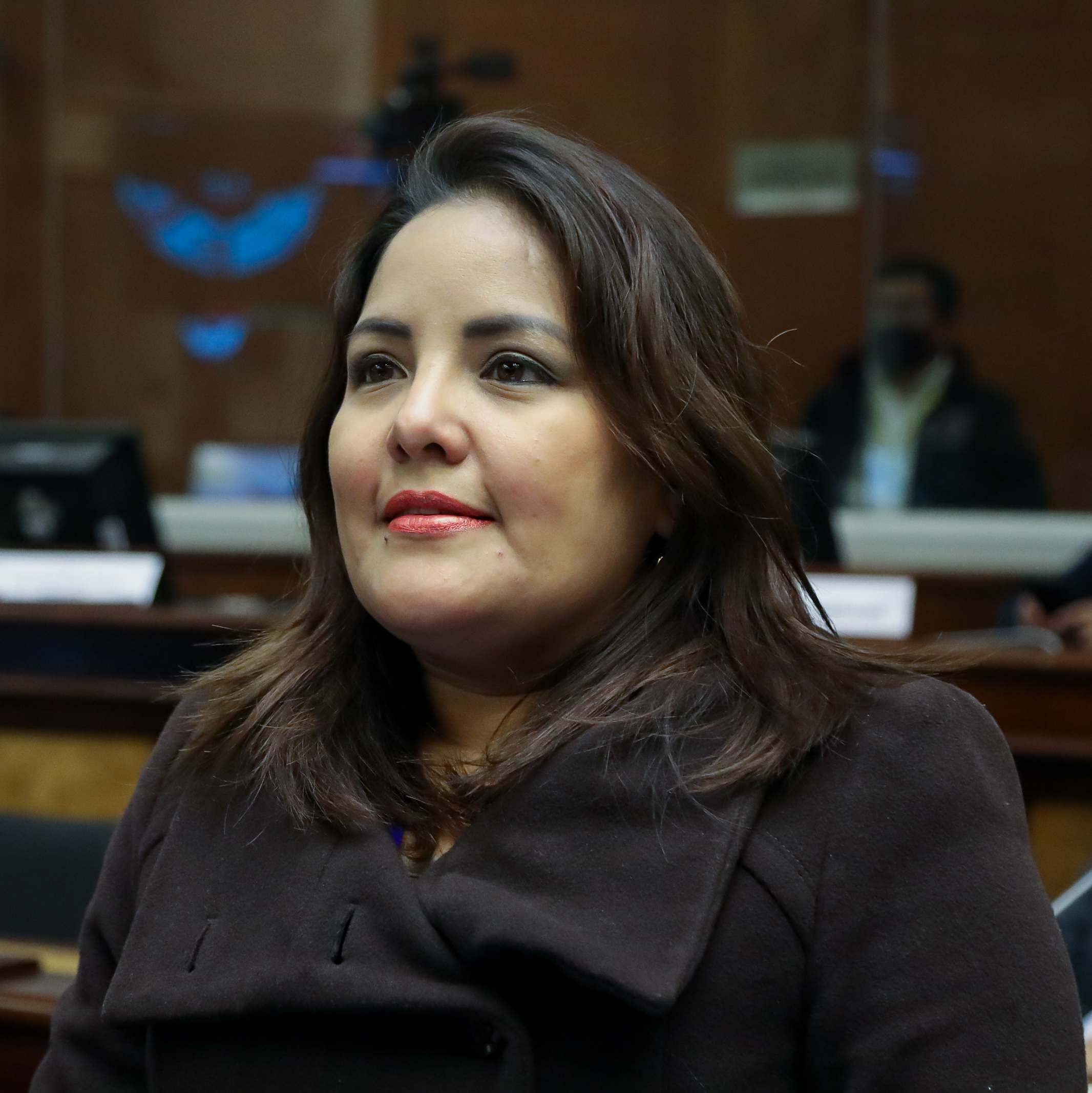
- in May 2022
- Born: 15 July 1982 (age 43)
- Other name: María Vanessa Álava Moreira
- Occupation: politician
- Political party: Movimiento Centro Democrático

María Vanessa Álava Moreira is an Ecuadorian politician who was elected to Ecuador's National Assembly for the Movimiento Centro Democrático. She was not re-elected in 2023.

== Life ==
Álava was born in 1982 and she was brought up in El Carmen Canton. She studied at the Technical University of Manabí and she gained a Master in Business Administration at the Agrarian University of Ecuador.

She worked as a bank clerk in 2010 and 2013 at the National Development Bank.

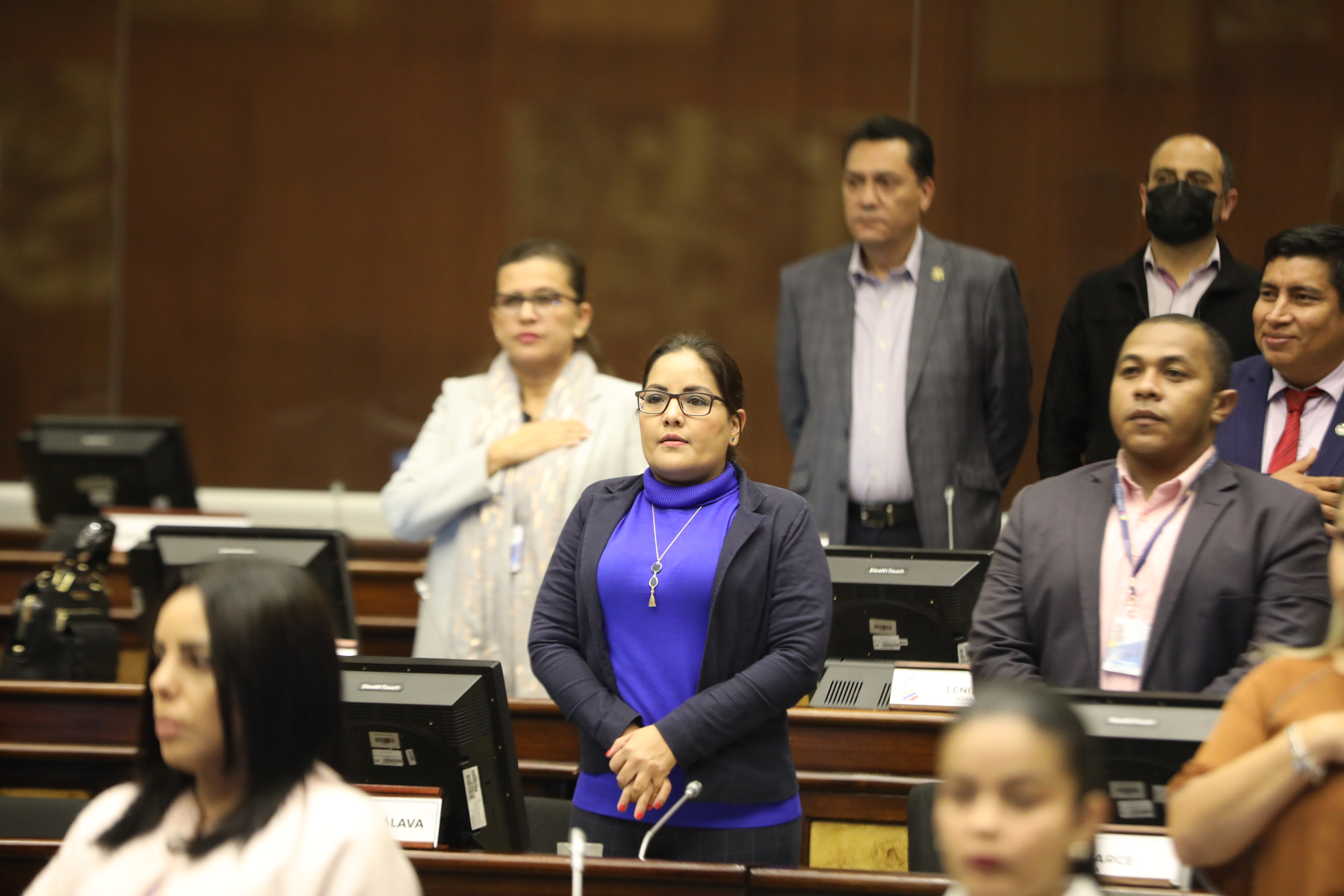
Álava at work in 2022

She was elected to the National Assembly to represent the province of Manabi in 2021. Her substitute is Coppiano Arguello Yalina Mishell. She is one of the Assembly's members who sit on the "Permanent Commission on Biodiversity and Natural Resources".

In November 2021, she was one of the eighty-one members of the Assembly who did not vote for the Economic Reform Bill which would have brought in changes to the tax system.

In April 2022 she proposed a law relating to personal finance. The change would require full disclosure of information and it would allow for refinancing.

In June 2022 she was among the members who requested a debate concerning the replacement of President Guillermo Lasso. Forty-six other members signed the request including Sofía Espín, Jhajaira Urresta, Patricia Mendoza, Victoria Desintonio, Viviana Veloz and Rosa Mayorga. Lasso brought in the constitution clause number 148 known as Mutual death in May 2023 when he knew that he was about to be impeached. This required all of the National Assembly members to stand for re-election. She and 67 others stood for re-election, but she was not one of the 43 re-elected later that year.
