= Rosa Mayorga =

Ecuadorian politician

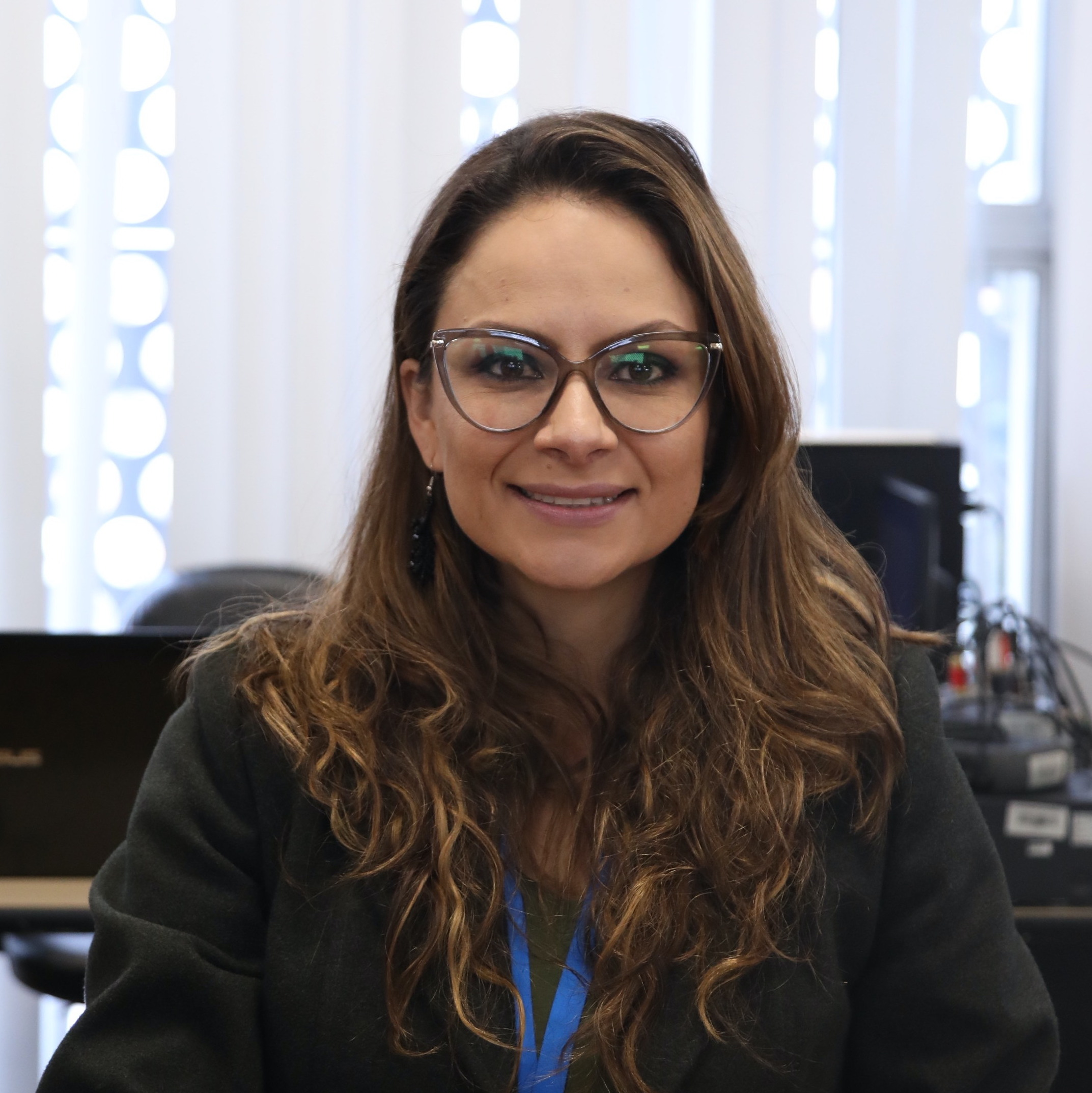
- in 2024
- Occupations: academic and politician
- Known for: member of the National Assembly
- Political party: Revolución Ciudadana

Rosa Belén Mayorga Tapia is an Ecuadorian politician who became a member of the National Assembly in 2021.

== Life ==
In 2012 she became a professor at the Universidad Técnica de Ambato and she worked there until 2015.

She was elected to the National Assembly in 2021. She represents the province of Tungurahua.

In June 2022 she was among the members who requested a debate concerning the replacement of President Guillermo Lasso because of his alleged mismanagement. 46 other members supported the request including Mónica Palacios, Vanessa Álava, Jhajaira Urresta, Patricia Mendoza, Victoria Desintonio, Ana María Raffo, Viviana Veloz and Sofía Espín.

She was re-elected in August 2023 to be one of the four Tungurahua National assembly members. She stood for the Revolución Ciudadana party. She, Ana Galarza, Ramiro Vela and Rosa Baltazar (in absentia) were acknowledged as successful in a ceremony on 15 October 2023 in the city hall by Lorena Ramos, director of the Provincial Electoral Delegation of Tungurahua. Her substitute was Cármen Selena Andagana Pacari.

In 2024 she was a member of the National Assemby's Permanent Commission on the Right to Health and Sports.
