= Flavio Alfaro Canton =

- Canton
- Location of Manabí Province in Ecuador.

- Flavio Alfaro Canton in Manabí Province
- Coordinates: 0.4054°S 79.9058°W
- Country: Ecuador
- Province: Manabí Province
- Time zone: UTC-5 (ECT)

Flavio Alfaro Canton is a canton of Ecuador, in the Manabí Province. Its capital is Flavio Alfaro. Its population at the 2001 census was 25,390.

== Demographics ==
Ethnic groups as of the Ecuadorian census of 2010:

- Mestizo 79.7%
- Montubio 13.7%
- Afro-Ecuadorian 3.9%
- White 2.6%
- Indigenous 0.1%
- Other 0.1%
