= Jaminton Intriago =

Ecuadorian politician

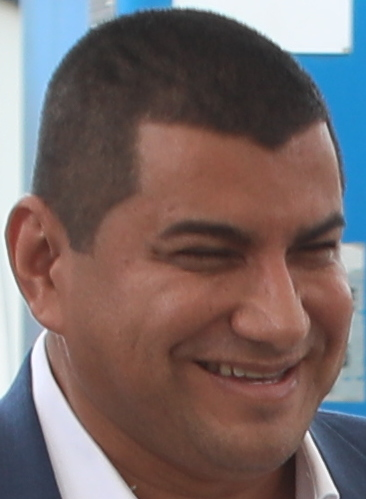

Member of the National Assembly of Ecuador
- Incumbent
- Assumed office November 17, 2023
- Constituency: Manabí District 1

Mayor of Flavio Alfaro
- In office 2019–2023
- Preceded by: Eduardo Cedeño
- Succeeded by: Humberto Barreiro

Mayor of Flavio Alfaro
- In office 2009–2014
- Succeeded by: Eduardo Cedeño

Mayor of Flavio Alfaro
- In office 2005–2009
- Preceded by: Pedro Cedeño Mejía

Councilman of Flavio Alfaro
- In office 2000–2004

Personal details
- Born: Jaminton Enrique Intriago Alcívar; July 2, 1971 (age 55) Flavio Alfaro, Manabí, Ecuador
- Party: Christian Social Party
- Education: University of Havana
- Occupation: Agricultural engineer and politician

Jaminton Enrique Intriago Alcívar (born July 2, 1971) is an Ecuadorian agricultural engineer and politician. He currently serves as a member of the National Assembly of Ecuador representing Manabí District 1. He has also served as Mayor of Flavio Alfaro and as Councilman of Flavio Alfaro.

== Early years ==
Jaminton Intriago was born in the Flavio Alfaro canton, Manabí. He obtained his degree in agricultural engineering from the University of Havana, Cuba, where he specialized in topics related to agriculture and rural development.

== Political career ==
His political career began in his native canton, Flavio Alfaro, where he was elected mayor for two terms. During his tenure, he focused on improving infrastructure and public services, as well as promoting agricultural development in the region.

In November 2023, Intriago was installed as an assembly member for the province of Manabí District 1, representing the Unidos Somos Más alliance, made up of the Social Christian Party and the provincial Caminantes movement. As an assemblyman, he has been a strong defender of food sovereignty and has worked to recover the agricultural sector of Manabí and the entire country.

During his term as assemblyman, he chaired the Permanent Commission on Food Sovereignty and Development of the Agricultural and Fishing Sector, where he promoted legislative initiatives to strengthen the food sovereignty policy and support Ecuadorian farmers and fishermen.

== See also ==
- Flavio Alfaro Canton
