= Viviana Veloz =

Ecuadorian politician

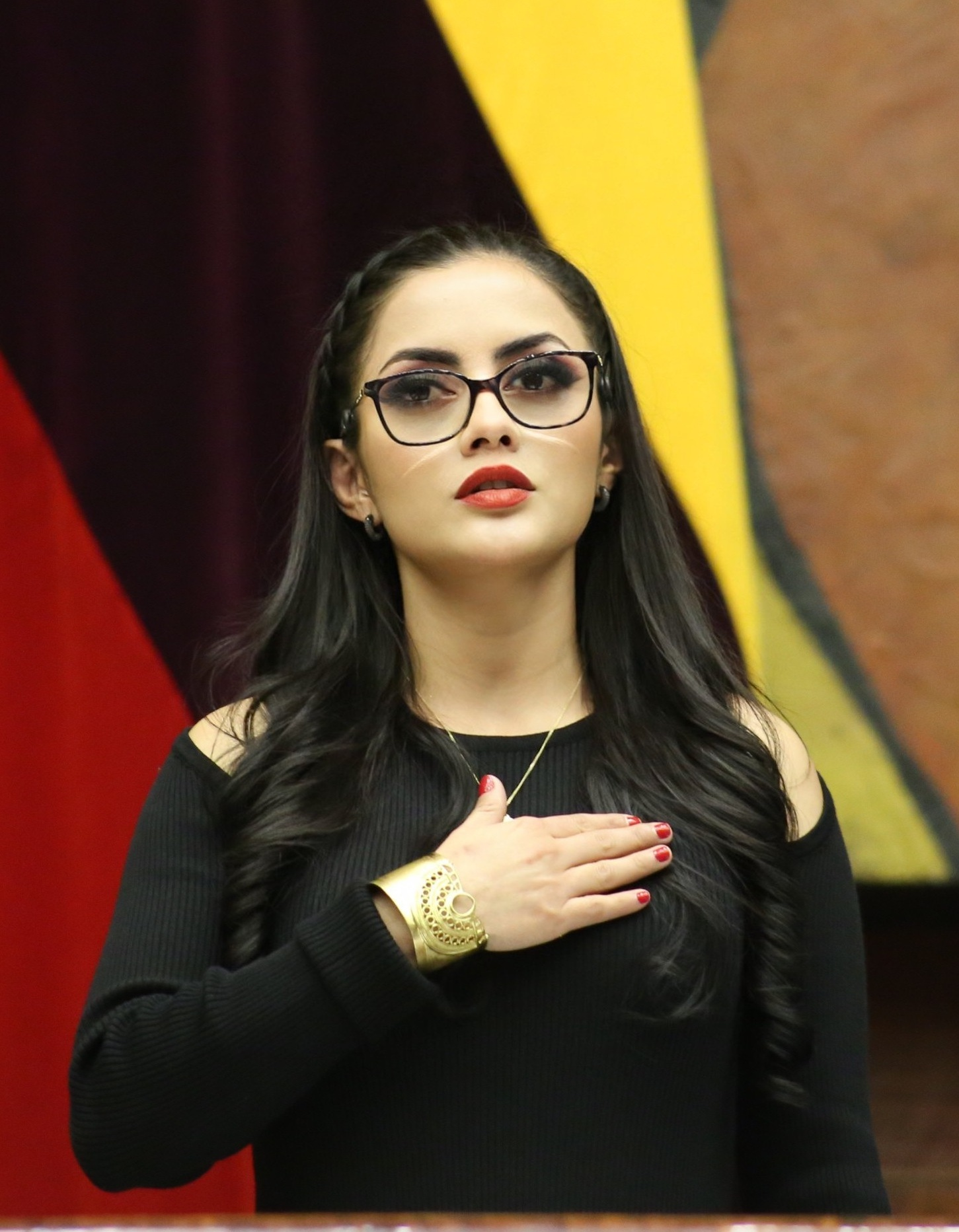
- Veloz in 2024

President of the National Assembly
- In office 2 October 2024 – 14 May 2025
- Preceded by: Henry Kronfle
- Succeeded by: Niels Olsen Peet

Personal details
- Born: 7 November 1984 (age 42)
- Party: Citizen Revolution Movement

Rebeca Viviana Veloz Ramírez is an Ecuadorian politician who served as the President of the National Assembly from October 2024 to May 2025. She represents the Santo Domingo de los Tsáchilas Province. She led the prosecution of President Guillermo Lasso in the National Assembly. This led to the President resigning and dissolving parliament which then required new elections. Veloz was re-elected and she was Vice President of the Assembly until she became the Assembly's President.

== Life ==
Veloz was born on 7 November 1984. She was elected to represent the Province of Santo Domingo de los Tsáchilas with Ruiz Emerson Hinojosa as her substitute.

She served on the Permanent Commission on Biodiversity and Natural Resources.

In June 2022, Veloz raised a formal protest against humiliating and insulting remarks made by the head of the Pachakutik caucus, Salvador Quishpe, in the National Assembly. She requested that he be suspended from the assembly for 30 days. Witnesses to the offending words included Jhajaira Urresta.

On 24 June 2022, she was among the members who requested a debate concerning the replacement of President Lasso. 46 other members signed the request including, Victoria Desintonio, Vanessa Álava, Sofía Espín, Jhajaira Urresta, Patricia Mendoza and Rosa Mayorga.

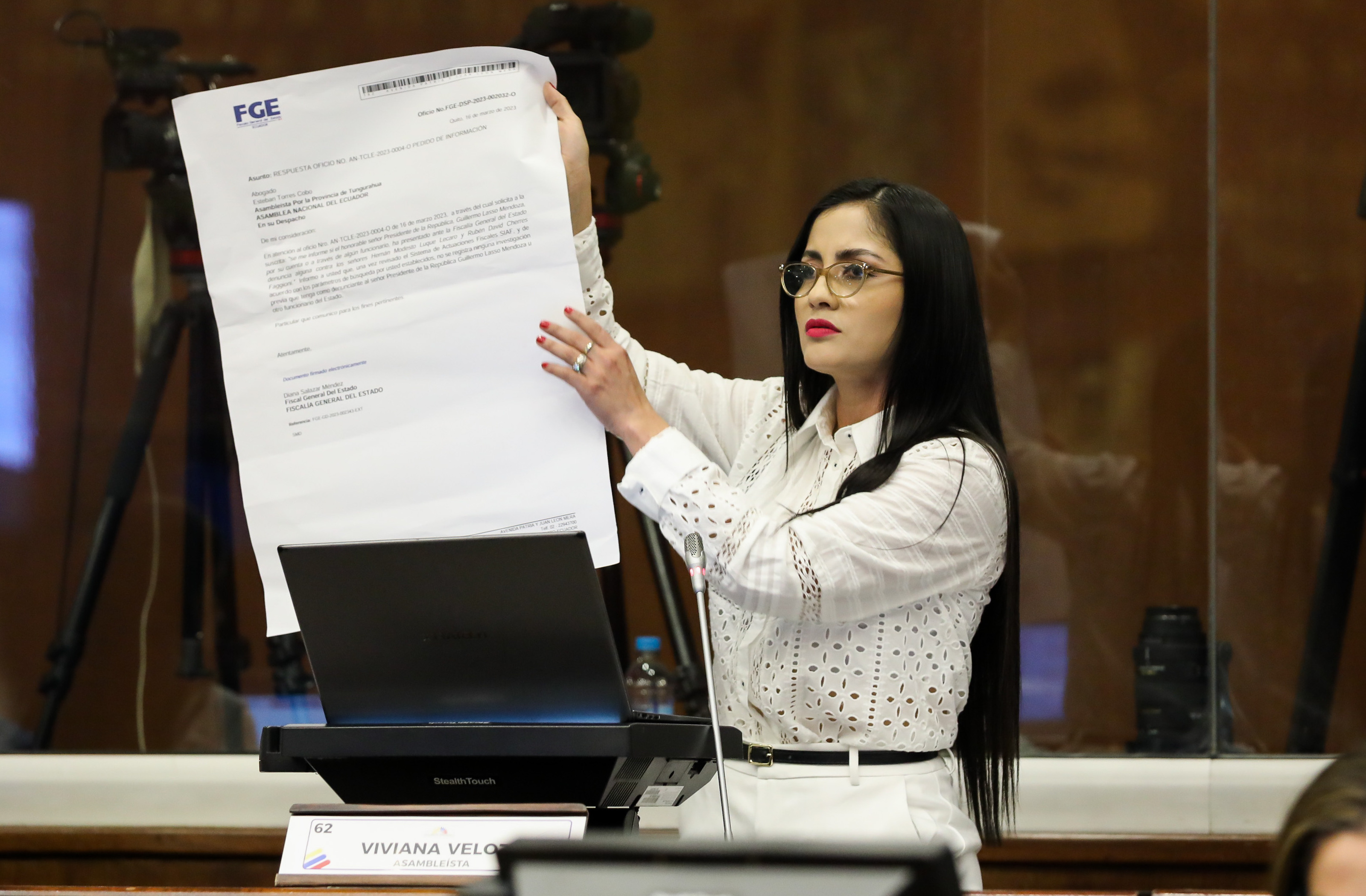
Veloz showing evidence at the National Assembly in May 2023

In May 2023, Lasso's lawyer was contesting the case of corruption against President Lasso at the National Assembly. Veloz led the prosecution and gave evidence against Lasso who said that the contract in question was signed years before he became president. Veloz said that embezzlement was spotted in the contract by the public company Flopec and Lasso had taken no action. Veloz recommended that Lasso should be punished and replaced as president. Some observers said that Ecuador's problems were more important than the trial. However Veloz showed videos and copies of letters to the assembly which were intended to prove his guilt.

Lasso as President brought in the constitution clause number 148 known as Mutual death in May 2023 when he knew that he was about to be impeached. This required all of the National Assembly members to stand for re-election. Veloz was re-elected in August 2023 and when the National Assembly re-convened she became a vice-President of the Assembly. There were 99 votes in favour of her election and 24 against.

In October 2024 she assumed the Presidency of the National Assembly after the incumbent President, Henry Kronfle, stood down to concentrate on the next election of Ecuador's President in 2025.

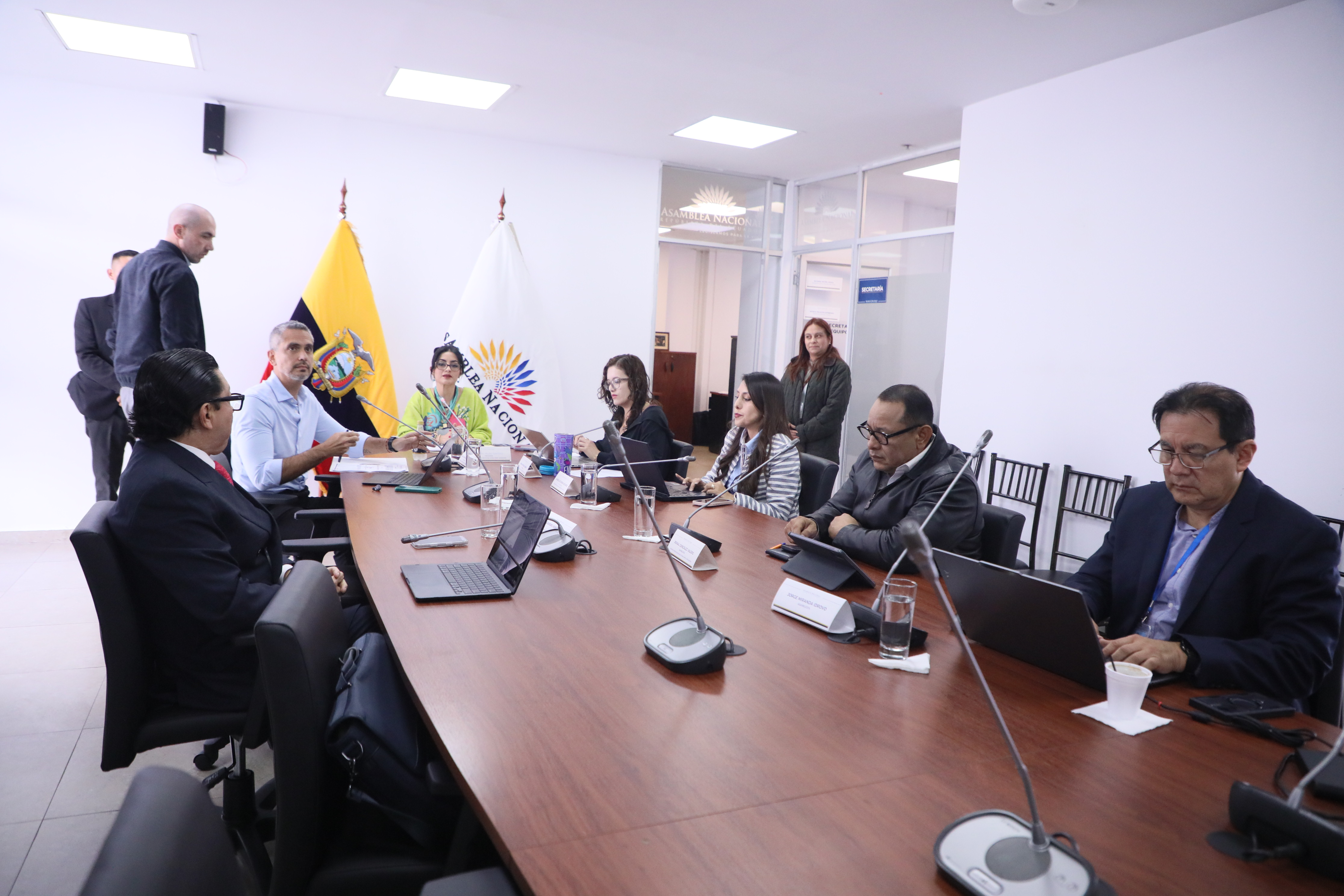
Commission for the Comprehensive Protection of Girls, Boys and Adolescents in 2025

In the 2025 general elections, Veloz was reelected to the National Assembly for the 2025-2029 legislative period. She was succeeded by Niels Olsen Peet as President of the National Assembly on 14 May 2025. Veloz was chosen to lead the National Assembly's Commission for the Comprehensive Protection of Girls, Boys and Adolescents. Her vice President was Raúl Arturo Chávez Nuñez del Arco and the commission's members included Paola Cabezas, Monica Palacios, Dina Farinango and Mireya Pazmino.
