= Jhajaira Urresta =

Member of the National Assembly of Ecuador

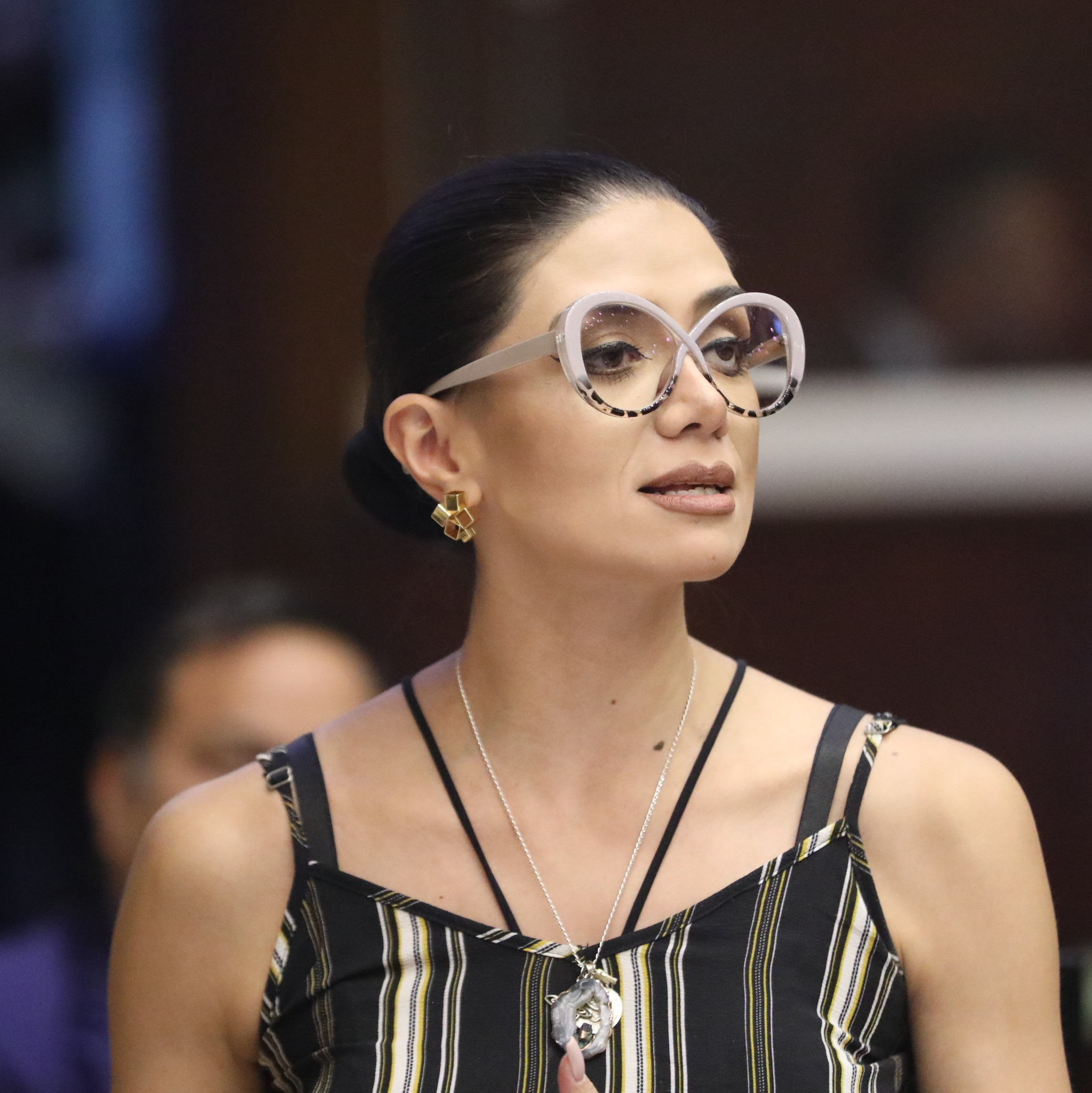
- Urresta in 2025
- Occupation: Politician
- Known for: Member of the National Assembly
- Political party: Union for Hope (UNES), Citizen Revolution Movement, Independent (in 2025)

Jhajaira Estefanía Urresta Guzmán is an Ecuadorian member of the National Assembly of Ecuador. She came to prominence after losing an eye during the 2019 Ecuadorian Protests. She has called for the resignation of government ministers. She was re-elected in 2025 and later left the Citizen Revolution Movement.

== Life ==
Urresta came to prominence after losing an eye during the 2019 protests in Ecuador against austerity measures. She was participating in a peaceful protest, which was after a 3 p.m. curfew that had been imposed. She was targeted and hit by a tear gas canister, which caused substantial damage to her left eye. She was one of 15 people who lost at least one eye during the protests.

She became a member of the UNES party and she was elected to Ecuador's fourth National Assembly in 2021 to represent the Province of Pichincha.

In May 2022 she raised the question of the competency of the second vice-President of the assembly Yeseña Guamaní with the Legislative Administration Council and she requested a multi-party investigation into an alleged breach of duties. A committee was formed consisting of Patricia Mendoza, Mireya Pazmiño, Elina Narváez, Rocio Guanoluisa and María José Plaza to consider Urresta's complaint.

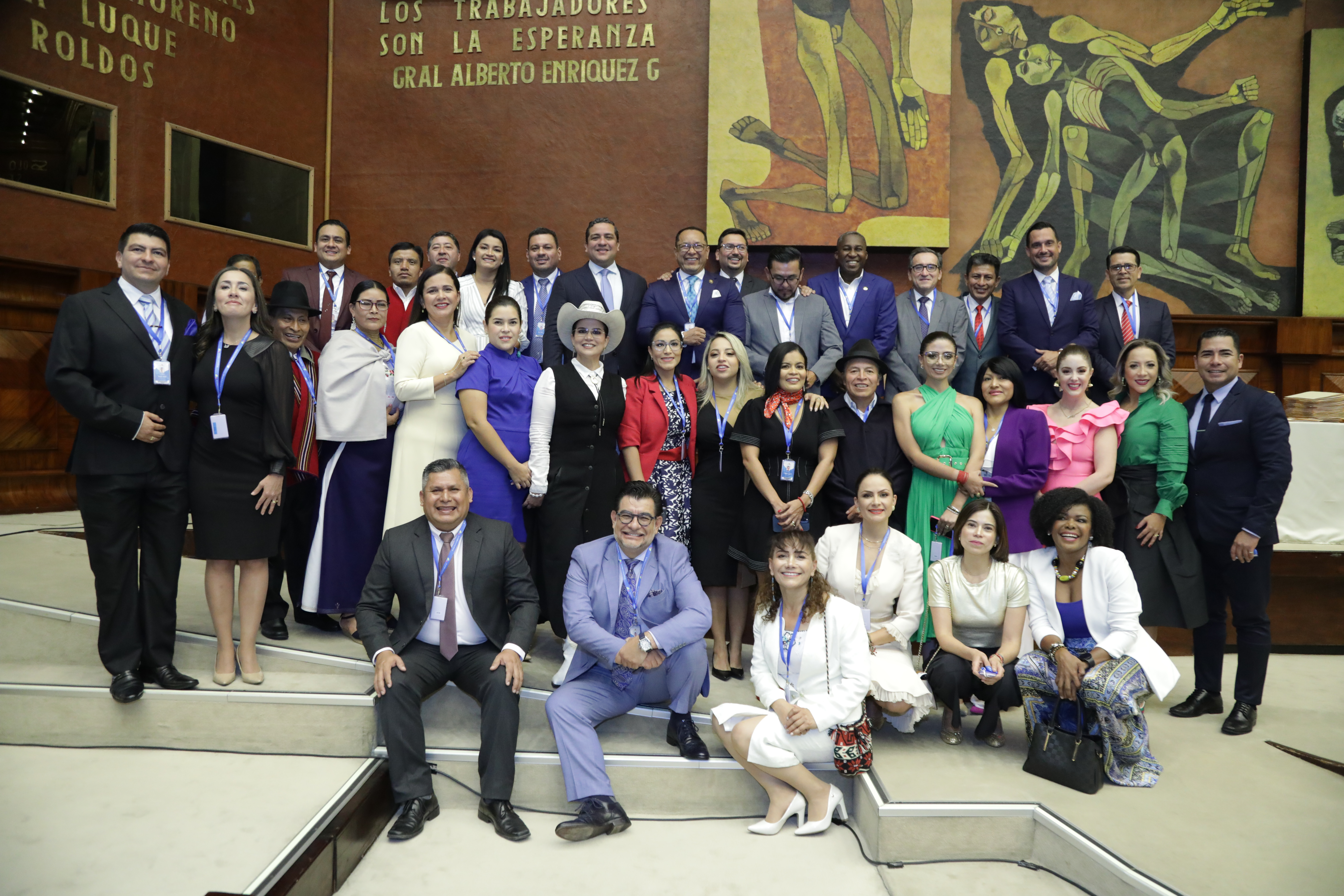
The 2023 National Assembly. She is in green, 11th from the left in the middle row

In June 2022 Urresta was among the National Assembly members who proposed the replacement of President Guillermo Lasso because of alleged mismanagement. Forty-six other members supported the proposal including Vanessa Álava, Ana María Raffo, Patricia Mendoza, Victoria Desintonio, Viviana Veloz and Rosa Mayorga.

In 2022 she and fellow assembly member Peter Calo called for the impeachment of the Minister of the Interior, Patrick Carrillo Rosero. They proposed that Carrillo did not handle the response to the strike correctly in June 2022.

President Nobea ordered a raid on the Mexican embassy on 5 April 2024 to retrieve the fugitive ex-vice-President Jorge Glas. Mexico broke off relations with Ecuador and appealed to the international community. The impeachment of the Minister of Foreign Affairs Gabriela Sommerfeld was proposed in the National Assembly by Urresta. Urresta alleged that Sommerfeld had not carried out her duties because she did not stop the embassy raid. Ecuador's action was almost universally condemned by the Organization of American States. Sommerfeld agreed that this was a fair result, but Ecuador was not ready to apologise for its actions.

She was re-elected to the National Assembly and she was chosen in 2025 to join the National Assembly's Commission on Sovereignty, Integration and Comprehensive Security. It was led by Inés Alarcón and other members included Jahiren Noriega, Mariana Yumbay, Camila Anahi Cueva Toro and Gema Karolina Dueñas Palma. They will serve until 2027.

In July 2025 she left the Citizen Revolution Movement and became an independent. This followed her accusations against Luisa González who was the President of the Citizen Revolution Movement.
