= Patricia Mendoza =

Ecuadorian politician

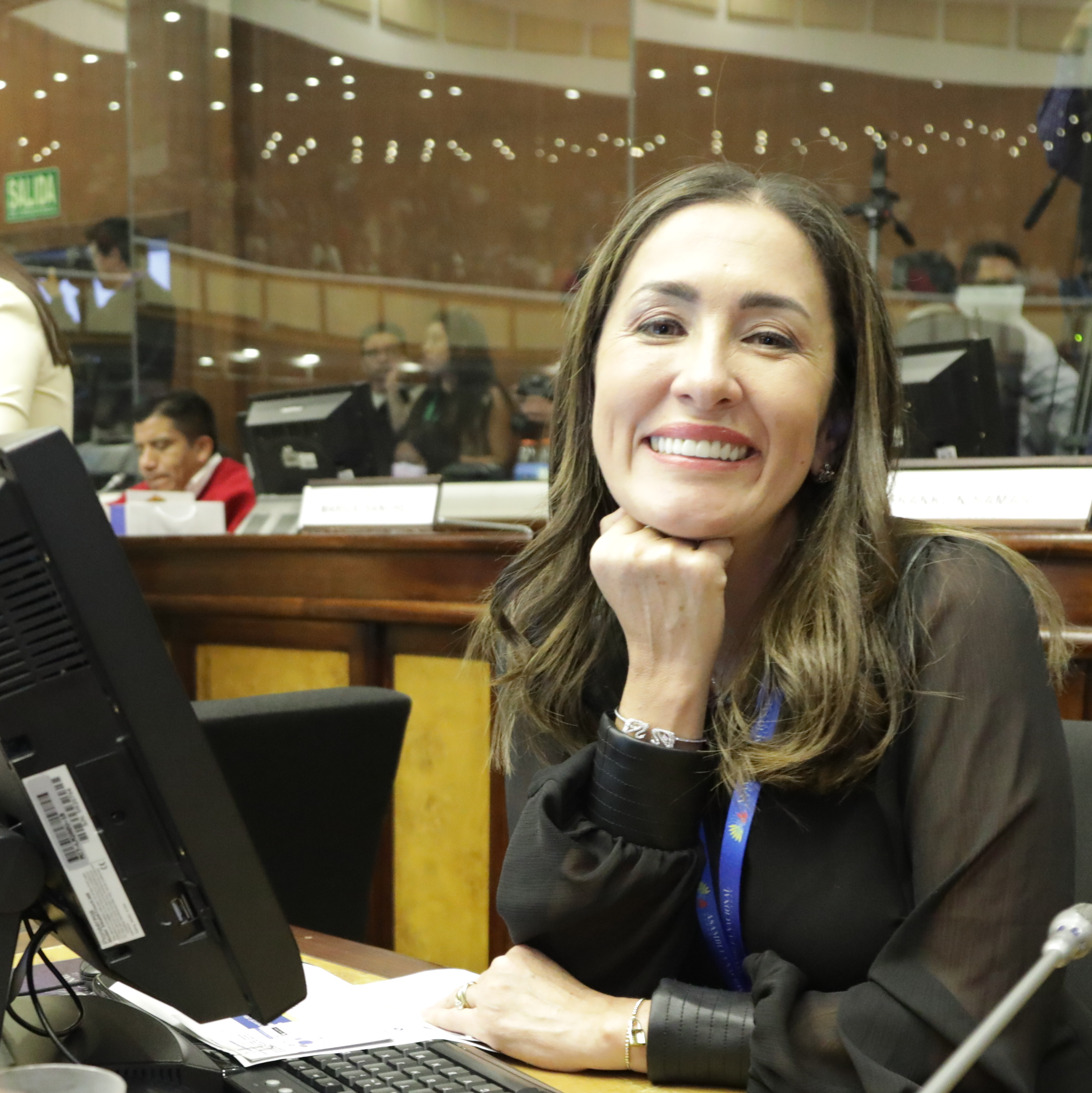
- in 2023
- Other names: Patricia Monserrat Mendoza Jiménez
- Occupation: politician

Patricia Monserrat Mendoza Jiménez is an Ecuadorian politician from the Democratic Center party. She attends the National Assembly on behalf of the Province of Esmereldas after the 2021 election.

== Life ==
She qualified as a lawyer at the Central University of Ecuador. In 2011 she was at the Indoamerica Technological University gaining a master's degree in 2018.

Five years after the 2016 earthquake that hit the area, Mendoza welcomed measures passed in the National Assembly to encourage regeneration in the provinces of Esmeralda and Manabi. Funding would be available for projects including to supply loans and training for business people.

Mendoza and Luisa Gonzales jointly proposed 25 changes to the laws relating to the National Assembly in order to improve its productivity. They proposed changes to how a majority in favour should be defined and that the impeachment of the President and Vice-President should be deicided by a multi-party commission.

On 24 June 2022 she was among the members who requested a debate concerning the replacement of President Guillermo Lasso. 46 other members signed the request including Vanessa Álava, Jhajaira Urresta, María Vanessa Álava and Rosa Mayorga. Lasso brought in the constitution clause number 148 known as Mutual death in May 2023 when he knew that he was about to be impeached. This required all of the National Assembly members to stand for re-election. Mendoza and 67 others stood for re-election and she was one of the 43 re-elected later that year. The others re-elected included Ana Herrera, Sofía Sánchez and Gissella Molina.
