= Members of the fourth legislative period of the National Assembly of Ecuador =

List of Assembly members

This is a list of the assembly members who belong or have belonged to the 4th legislative period of the National Assembly of Ecuador which sat between 2021 and 2023.

== Nationals ==
Assembly member	Bench	#	Electoral list	Party	Period	
Assembly member	Bench	#	Electoral list	Party	Start	End
Agualsaca Guamán José Clemente	UNES	2	CD - FCS	RC	14 May 2021	
Andrade Muñoz Wilma Piedad	ID	70	ID	ID	14 May 2021	
Arias Arias Nathalie Andrea	BAN	74	CREO	CREO	14 May 2021	
Cabezas Castillo Janeth Paola	UNES	15	CD - FCS	RC	14 May 2021	
Cordero Cuesta Ana Belén	BAN	115	CREO	CREO	21 May 2021	
Corral Álava Raisa Irina	UNES	19	CD - FCS	RC	14 May 2021	
Correa Delgado Pierina Sara Mercedes	UNES	20	CD - FCS	RC	14 May 2021	
Henry Kronfle	PSC	89	PSC	PSC	14 May 2021	
César Monge	BAN	-	CREO	CREO	14 May 2021	21 May 2021
Quishpe Lozano Salvador	MUPP	65	MUPP	MUPP	14 May 2021	
Sánchez Gallegos Bertha Patricia	No bench	67	MUPP	MUPP	14 May 2021	
Ulcuango Farinango Ricardo	UNES	59	CD - FCS	RC	14 May 2021	
Vanegas Cortázar Ricardo Xavier	MUPP	121	MUPP	MUPP	14 May 2021	
Villavicencio Valencia Fernando Alcibiades	No bench	136	PSE - MC	Ind.	14 May 2021	
Viteri Jiménez Nathalie María	PSC	128	PSC	PSC	14 May 2021	
Eitel Zambrano Ortiz	BAN	127	ID	CREO	14 May 2021	

== Azuay ==
Assembly member	Bench	#	Electoral list	Party	Period	
Assembly member	Bench	#	Electoral list	Party	Start	End
Luis Bruno Segovia Mejía	No bench	69	MUPP - UP	Ind.	14 May 2021	
Sánchez Urgilés Sandra Sofía	MUPP	68	MUPP - UP	MUPP	14 May 2021	
Juan Cristóbal Lloret Valdivieso	UNES	-	CD - FCS	RC	14 May 2021	8 September 2022
Fernanda Mabel Méndez Rojas	UNES	40	CD - FCS	RC	8 September 2022	
Marcelo Cabrera	BAN	-	Igualdad - Participa	Igualdad	14 May 2021	24 May 2021
Pesántez Salto Diana Elizabeth	BAN	83	Igualdad - Participa	Igualdad	24 May 2021	
Rodrigo Olmedo Fajardo Campoverde	ID	77	ID	ID	14 May 2021	

== Bolivar ==
Assembly member	Bench	#	Electoral list	Party	Period	
Assembly member	Bench	#	Electoral list	Party	Start	End
Segundo Jose Chimbo Chimbo	MUPP	84	MUPP	MUPP	14 May 2021	
Pazmiño Arregui Mireya Katerine	No bench	51	MUPP	MUPP	14 May 2021	
Jorge Farah Abedrabbo García	PSC	72	SUMA - PSC	PSC	14 May 2021	

== Canar ==
Assembly member	Bench	#	Electoral list	Party	Period	
Assembly member	Bench	#	Electoral list	Party	Start	End
Abad Verdugo Joel Eduardo	MUPP	5	MUPP	MUPP	14 May 2021	
Luna Arévalo Blasco Remigio	UNES	41	CD - FCS	RC	14 May 2021	
Saquicela Espinoza Javier Virgilio	No bench	119	MDS	MDS	14 May 2021	

== Carchi ==
Assembly member	Bench	#	Electoral list	Party	Period	
Assembly member	Bench	#	Electoral list	Party	Start	End
Velasco Erazo, Pedro Ramiro	BAN	135	Avanza	Avanza	14 May 2021	
Vallejo Ayala, José Luis	UNES	61	CD - FCS	RC	14 May 2021	
Narváez Garzón, Ramiro Vladimir	ID	110	ID	ID	14 May 2021	

== Chimborazo ==
Assembly member	Bench	#	Electoral list	Party	Period	
Assembly member	Bench	#	Electoral list	Party	Start	End
Curicama Guamán Mariano	BAN	-	MINGA	MINGA	14 May 2021	24 March 2023
Estrada Vizuete Katherine Vanessa	BAN	93	MINGA	MINGA	24 March 2023	
Lucero Sisa Rafael	MUPP	47	MUPP	MUPP	14 May 2021	
Nuñez Ramos Silvia Patricia	UNES	54	CD - FCS	RC	14 May 2021	
Vinueza Salinas John Henry	No bench	137	UE	Ind.	14 May 2021	8 September 2022
Yuquilema Chimbolema Daysi Marilin	No bench	137	UE	Ind.	8 September 2022	

== Cotopaxi ==
Assembly member	Bench	#	Electoral list	Party	Period	
Assembly member	Bench	#	Electoral list	Party	Start	End
Calo Caisalitin Peter Fernando	No bench	14	MUPP	MUPP	14 May 2021	
Molina Álvarez Gissella Cecibel	MUPP	50	MUPP	MUPP	14 May 2021	
Herrera Gómez Ana Cecilia	UNES	31	CD - FCS	RC	14 May 2021	
Bacigalupo Buenaventura Dalton Emory	ID	71	ID	ID	14 May 2021	

== El Oro ==
Assembly member	Bench	#	Electoral list	Party	Period	
Assembly member	Bench	#	Electoral list	Party	Start	End
Zambrano Landín Carlos Víctor	UNES	63	CD - FCS	RC	14 May 2021	
Astudillo Barrezueta María Fernanda	UNES	11	CD - FCS	RC	14 May 2021	
Falquéz Batallas Pedro Carlos	PSC	87	PSC	PSC	14 May 2021	
Moreira Córdova Johanna Nicole	No bench	109	ID	ID	14 May 2021	
Pereira Chamba Darwin Stalin	No bench	106	MUPP	MUPP	14 May 2021	

== Emeralds ==
Assembly member	Bench	#	Electoral list	Party	Period	
Assembly member	Bench	#	Electoral list	Party	Start	End
Lara Rivadeneira Lenin José	UNES	38	CD	CD	14 May 2021	
Mendoza Jiménez Patricia Monserrat	UNES	44	CD	CD	14 May 2021	
Ortiz Jarrín Javier Eduardo	PSC	98	PSC	PSC	14 May 2021	
Campain Brambilla Rina Asunción	BAN	81	CREO	CREO	14 May 2021	

== Galapagos ==
Assembly member	Bench	#	Electoral list	Party	Period	
Assembly member	Bench	#	Electoral list	Party	Start	End
Zapata Rumipamba Pedro Aníbal	PSC	131	PSC	PSC	14 May 2021	
Rojas Cuenca Fredy Ramiro	BAN	133	CREO	CREO	14 May 2021	

== Guayas ==
Assembly member	Bench	#	Electoral list	Party	Distrito	Period	
Assembly member	Bench	#	Electoral list	Party	Distrito	Start	End
Espín Reyes Eugenia Sofía	UNES	27	CD - FCS	RC	Circunscripción 1	14 May 2021	
Cuero Medina Roberto Emilio	UNES	21	CD - FCS	RC	Circunscripción 1	14 May 2021	
Almeida Morán Luis Fernando	PSC	73	PSC - MDG	PSC	Circunscripción 1	14 May 2021	
Weber Moreno Geraldine	PSC	129	PSC - MDG	MDG	Circunscripción 1	14 May 2021	
Jiménez Torres Bella Daniela	No bench	-	ID	Ind.	Circunscripción 1	14 May 2021	12 de octubre de 2021
Onofa Cárdenas Daniel Sigrifredo	ID	96	ID	ID	Circunscripción 1	12 de octubre de 2021	
Aleaga Santos Ronny Xavier	UNES	7	CD - FCS	RC	Circunscripción 2	14 May 2021	
Desintonio Malave Victoria Tatiana	UNES	26	CD - FCS	RC	Circunscripción 2	14 May 2021	
Passailaigue Manosalvas Dallyana Marianela	PSC	99	PSC - MDG	MDG	Circunscripción 2	14 May 2021	
Molina Jurado Marcos Raúl Luis	ID	108	ID	ID	Circunscripción 2	14 May 2021	
Jiménez Sánchez Francisco Eduardo	BAN	-	CREO	CREO	Circunscripción 2	14 May 2021	30 de marzo de 2022
Villao Vera Briana Alejandra	BAN	101	CREO	CREO	Circunscripción 2	30 de marzo de 2022	
Arce Plúas Alexandra Manuela	UNES	10	CD - FCS	RC	Circunscripción 3	14 May 2021	
Álvarez Zambrano Ferdinan Arturo	UNES	9	CD - FCS	RC	Circunscripción 3	14 May 2021	
Rohon Hervas César Eduardo	No bench	-	PSC - MDG	Ind.	Circunscripción 3	14 May 2021	13 de marzo de 2022
Narváez Mendieta Elina Alexandra	PSC	112	PSC - MDG	PSC	Circunscripción 3	13 de marzo de 2022	
Diab Aguilar María Soledad	PSC	80	PSC - MDG	PSC	Circunscripción 3	14 May 2021	
Chiriboga High Guido Alberto	BAN	90	CREO	CREO	Circunscripción 3	14 May 2021	
Jurado Bedrán Xavier Andrés	UNES	37	CD - FCS	RC	Circunscripción 4	14 May 2021	
Raffo Guevara Ana María	UNES	57	CD - FCS	RC	Circunscripción 4	14 May 2021	
León Flores Francisco Javier	BAN	39	CD - FCS	Ind.	Circunscripción 4	14 May 2021	
Plúas Arias Nelly Zolanda	PSC	100	PSC - MDG	PSC	Circunscripción 4	14 May 2021	
Cevallos Peña Omar Vicente	BAN	24	MUPP	Ind.	Circunscripción 4	14 May 2021	

== Imbabura ==
Assembly member	Bench	#	Electoral list	Party	Period	
Assembly member	Bench	#	Electoral list	Party	Start	End
Aguirre Zambonino Pamela Alejandra	UNES	3	CD - FCS	RC	14 May 2021	
Ruiz Jácome Mario Fernando	No bench	66	MUPP	MUPP	14 May 2021	
Cervantes Villalba Luis Patricio	BAN	82	CREO	CREO	14 May 2021	
Marcillo Ruiz Luis Aníbal	ID	97	ID	ID	14 May 2021	

== Loja ==
Assembly member	Bench	#	Electoral list	Party	Period	
Assembly member	Bench	#	Electoral list	Party	Start	End
Medina Quizhpe Manuel Asunción	MUPP	49	MUPP - UP	MUPP	14 May 2021	
Ortiz Villavicencio Johanna Cecibel	UNES	55	CD - FCS	RC	14 May 2021	
Placencia Tapia Lucía Shadira	No bench	124	ID	ID	14 May 2021	
Maldonado Ontaneda Byron VStart	BAN	102	CREO	CREO	14 May 2021	

== The Rivers ==
Assembly member	Bench	#	Electoral list	Party	Period	
Assembly member	Bench	#	Electoral list	Party	Start	End
Alvarado Espinel Marcos Humberto	UNES	8	CD - FCS	RC	14 May 2021	
Freire Vergara Vanessa Lorena	BAN	28	CD - FCS	Ind.	14 May 2021	
González Valero Ronal Eduardo	UNES	30	CD - FCS	CD	14 May 2021	
Terán Barragán Johnny Enrique	PSC	113	PSC	PSC	14 May 2021	
Troya Fuertes Marco Stalin	BAN	120	MEU	Ind.	14 May 2021	
Mendoza Hurtado Eduardo Israel	BAN	105	Avanza	Avanza	14 May 2021	

== Manabi ==
Assembly member	Bench	#	Electoral list	Party	Distrito	Period	
Assembly member	Bench	#	Electoral list	Party	Distrito	Start	End
González Alcívar Luisa Magdalena	UNES	29	CD - FCS	RC	Norte	14 May 2021	
Barreto Zambrano Lenin Daniel	UNES	12	CD - FCS	RC	Norte	14 May 2021	
Álava Moreira María Vanessa	UNES	4	CD - FCS	RC	Norte	14 May 2021	
Cruz Andrade Hugo Benjamín	BAN	92	MC25	MC25	Norte	14 May 2021	
Miranda Giler Lyne Katiuska	UNES	46	CD - FCS	RC	Sur	14 May 2021	
Cedeño Rivadeneira Fernando Enrique	UNES	16	CD - FCS	RC	Sur	14 May 2021	
Molina Menéndez María Gabriela	UNES	52	CD - FCS	RC	Sur	14 May 2021	
Santos Sabando Xavier Adolfo	No bench	126	ID	CD	Sur	14 May 2021	
Acuña Figueroa Joao Aaron	UNES	1	CD - FCS	RC	Sur	14 May 2021	

== Morona Santiago ==
Assembly member	Bench	#	Electoral list	Party	Period	
Assembly member	Bench	#	Electoral list	Party	Start	End
Chumpi Jua José Celestino	MUPP	34	MUPP	MUPP	14 May 2021	
Vega Olmedo Ligia del Consuelo	MUPP	122	MUPP	MUPP	14 May 2021	

== Napo ==
Assembly member	Bench	#	Electoral list	Party	Period	
Assembly member	Bench	#	Electoral list	Party	Start	End
Cerda Cerda Rosa Elizabeth	No bench	23	MUPP	Ind.	14 May 2021	
Varela Salazar Washington Julio Darwin	BAN	134	PSP - Antisuyo Ushito	Antisuyo Ushito	14 May 2021	

== Orellana ==
Assembly member	Bench	#	Electoral list	Party	Period	
Assembly member	Bench	#	Electoral list	Party	Start	End
Llori Abarca Esperanza Guadalupe	MUPP	94	MUPP - MC25	MUPP	14 May 2021	
Sánchez Sarango Mariuxi Cleopatra	UNES	58	CD - FCS	RC	14 May 2021	

== Pastaza ==
Assembly member	Bench	#	Electoral list	Party	Period	
Assembly member	Bench	#	Electoral list	Party	Start	End
Jachero Robalino Washington Elías	BAN	88	UPP - PSC	UPP	14 May 2021	
Calapucha Grefa Efren Noé	MUPP	13	MUPP	MUPP	14 May 2021	

== Pichincha ==
Assembly member	Bench	#	Electoral list	Party	Distrito	Period	
Assembly member	Bench	#	Electoral list	Party	Distrito	Start	End
Holguín Naranjo Marcela Priscila	UNES	32	CD - FCS	RC	Centro-Norte	14 May 2021	
Plaza Gómez de la Torre María José	BAN	132	CREO - ADE	CREO	Centro-Norte	14 May 2021	
Jaramillo Gómez César Alejandro	No bench	95	ID	ID	Centro-Norte	14 May 2021	
Chávez Macías Marjorie de los Ángeles	PSC	79	PSC	PSC	Centro-Norte	14 May 2021	
Urresta Guzman Jhajaira Estefanía	UNES	60	CD - FCS	RC	Centro-Sur	14 May 2021	
Recalde Álava Eckenner Reader	No bench	125	ID	Ind.	Centro-Sur	14 May 2021	
Castillo Cárdenas Jessica Carolina	MUPP	22	MUPP	MUPP	Centro-Sur	14 May 2021	
Pinto Dávila Jorge Washington	BAN	117	CREO - ADE	CREO	Centro-Sur	14 May 2021	
Guanoluisa Farinango Amparo Rocío	No bench	86	ID	ID	Centro-Sur	14 May 2021	
Muñoz López Christian Pabel	UNES	53	CD - FCS	RC	Quito Rural	14 May 2021	
Cadena Carrera Marlon Wulester	ID	76	ID	ID	Quito Rural	14 May 2021	
Cabascango Collaguazo José Fernando	No bench	6	MUPP	MUPP	Quito Rural	14 May 2021	
Ordóñez Guerrero Diego Hernán	BAN	-	CREO - ADE	CREO	Quito Rural	14 May 2021	4 February 2022
Sacancela Quishpe Blanca Lucrecia	BAN	116	CREO - ADE	CREO	Quito Rural	4 February 2022	
Jarrín Terán Fausto Alejandro	UNES	33	CD - FCS	RC	Resto de Pichincha	14 May 2021	
Guamani Vásquez Ludvia Yeseña	ID	85	ID	ID	Resto de Pichincha	14 May 2021	
Farinango Quilumbaquin Dina Maribel	MUPP	36	MUPP	MUPP	Resto de Pichincha	14 May 2021	

== Saint Helena ==
Assembly member	Bench	#	Electoral list	Party	Period	
Assembly member	Bench	#	Electoral list	Party	Start	End
Mera Cedeño Lenin Francisco	UNES	45	CD - FCS	RC	14 May 2021	
Aquino Merchán María del Carmen	BAN	75	Únete - Renacer Peninsular - PSC	Únete	14 May 2021	
Noboa Azín Daniel Roy-Gilchrist	BAN	118	MEU	Ind.	14 May 2021	

== Santa Domingo de la Tsachilas ==
Assembly member	Bench	#	Electoral list	Party	Period	
Assembly member	Bench	#	Electoral list	Party	Start	End
Veloz Ramírez Rebeca Viviana	UNES	62	CD - FCS	RC	14 May 2021	
Chávez Valencia José Ricardo	UNES	17	CD - FCS	RC	14 May 2021	
Zambrano Azua Gruber Cesario	BAN	130	PSC	Ind.	14 May 2021	
Ortiz Olaya Amada María	No bench	111	ID	Ind.	14 May 2021	

== Succumbs ==
Assembly member	Bench	#	Electoral list	Party	Period	
Assembly member	Bench	#	Electoral list	Party	Start	End
Guamán Rivera Augusto Alejandro	BAN	104	Acuerdo Ciudadano	Acuerdo Ciudadano	14 May 2021	
Córdova Díaz Comps Pascacio	UNES	18	CD - FCS	RC	14 May 2021	
Quezada Patiño Edgar Patricio	MUPP	107	MUPP	MUPP	14 May 2021	

== Tungurahua ==
Assembly member	Bench	#	Electoral list	Party	Period	
Assembly member	Bench	#	Electoral list	Party	Start	End
Yucailla Yucailla Cristian Omar	MUPP	123	MUPP	MUPP	14 May 2021	
Mayorga Tapia Rosa Belén	UNES	43	CD - FCS	RC	14 May 2021	
Frías Borja Edwin Ramiro	ID	78	ID	ID	14 May 2021	
Torres Cobo Luis Esteban	PSC	114	PSC - TC	TC	14 May 2021	

== Zamora Chinchipe ==
Assembly member	Bench	#	Electoral list	Party	Period	
Assembly member	Bench	#	Electoral list	Party	Start	End
Enriquez Jaya Isabel María	MUPP	35	MUPP - UP	MUPP	14 May 2021	
Esparza Aguirre Diego Fernando	No bench	103	PSE - MC	PSE	14 May 2021	

== Ex-Pats ==
Assembly member	Bench	#	Electoral list	Party	Represents	Period	
Assembly member	Bench	#	Electoral list	Party	Represents	Start	End
Mateus Acosta Gustavo Enrique	UNES	42	CD - FCS	RC	Europe, Asia and Oceanía	14 May 2021	
Cuesta Santana Esther Adelina	UNES	25	CD - FCS	RC	Europe, Asia and Oceanía	14 May 2021	
Palacios Zambrano Mónica Estefanía	UNES	56	CD - FCS	RC	EE. UU. y Canadá	14 May 2021	
Maita Zapata Ángel Salvador	MUPP	48	MUPP	MUPP	EE. UU. y Canadá	14 May 2021	
Zambrano Valle Eduardo Mauricio	UNES	64	CD - FCS	RC	Latin America, the Caribbean and Africa	14 May 2021	
Flores Arroyo Juan Fernando	BAN	91	CREO	CREO	Latin America, the Caribbean and Africa	14 May 2021	

== Assembly members who left their seats ==
Assembly member	Party	Date	Motivo	Reason	Party	Ref.
Monge Ortega César Santiago	Movimiento CREO	21 May 2021	Resignation; Designación como Ministro de Gobierno	Cordero Cuesta Ana Belén	Movimiento CREO	
Cabrera Palacios Hugo Marcelo	Igualdad	24 May 2021	Resignation; Designación como Ministro de Transporte	Pesántez Salto Diana Elizabeth	Igualdad	
Jiménez Torres Bella Daniela	Ind.	12 Oct 2021	Destitución	Onofa Cárdenas Daniel Sigrifredo	Izquierda Democrática	
Ordóñez Guerrero Diego Hernán	Movimiento CREO	4 Feb 2022	Renuncia	Sacancela Quishpe Blanca Lucrecia	Movimiento CREO	
Rohon Hervas César Eduardo	Ind.	13 March 2022	Renuncia	Narváez Mendieta Elina Alexandra	Partido Social Cristiano	
Jiménez Sánchez Francisco Eduardo	Movimiento CREO	30 de marzo de 2022	Resignation; Designación como Ministro de Gobierno	Villao Vera Briana Alejandra	Movimiento CREO	

== Abandoned their party ==
The following are the assembly members who left the movement or political party for which they were elected

Assembly member	Old Group		Date	New group		Cause	Ref.
Assembly member	Bench	Partido	Date	Bench	Partido	Cause	Ref.
Cevallos Peña Omar Vicente	Pachakutik	Pachakutik	12 May 2021	Acuerdo Nacional	Ind.	Salida Voluntaria	
Rohon Hervas César Eduardo	Partido Social Cristiano	Partido Social Cristiano	14 May 2021	No bench	Ind.	Salida Voluntaria	
Ortiz Olaya Amada María	Izquierda Democrática	Izquierda Democrática	18 May 2021	No bench	Ind.	Expulsion	
Zambrano Ortiz Eitel James	Izquierda Democrática	Izquierda Democrática	20 May 2021	Acuerdo Nacional	Movimiento CREO	Salida Voluntaria	
Zambrano Azua Gruber Cesario	Partido Social Cristiano	Partido Social Cristiano	8 June 2021	Acuerdo Nacional	Ind.	Salida Voluntaria	
León Flores Francisco Javier	Unión por la Esperanza	Centro Democrático	10 June 2021	Acuerdo Nacional	Ind.	Salida Voluntaria	
Segovia Mejía Luis Bruno	Pachakutik	Pachakutik	21 July 2021	No bench	Ind.	Salida Voluntaria	
Freire Vergara Vanessa Lorena	Unión por la Esperanza	Fuerza Compromiso Social	27 July 2021	Acuerdo Nacional	Ind.	Salida Voluntaria	
Jiménez Torres Bella Daniela	Izquierda Democrática	Izquierda Democrática	22 August 2021	No bench	Ind.	Salida Voluntaria	
Recalde Álava Eckenner Reader	Izquierda Democrática	Izquierda Democrática	6 October 2021	No bench	Ind.	Salida Voluntaria	
Noboa Azín Daniel Roy-Gilchrist	Acuerdo Nacional	Ecuatoriano Unido	27 November 2021	Acuerdo Nacional	Ind.	Partido suprimido	
Troya Fuertes Marco Stalin	Acuerdo Nacional	Ecuatoriano Unido	27 November 2021	Acuerdo Nacional	Ind.	Partido suprimido	
Vinueza Salinas John Henry	No bench	Unión Ecuatoriana	27 November 2021	No bench	Ind.	Partido suprimido	
Villavicencio Valencia Fernando Alcibiades	No bench	Movimiento Concertación	27 November 2021	No bench	Ind.	Partido suprimido	
Jaramillo Gómez César Alejandro	Izquierda Democrática	Izquierda Democrática	30 April 2022	No bench	Ind.	Expulsion	
Cerda Cerda Rosa Elizabeth	Pachakutik	Pachakutik	22 April 2022	No bench	Ind.	Salida Voluntaria	
Jaramillo Gómez César Alejandro	No bench	Ind.	29 April 2022	No bench	Izquierda Democrática	Restitución	
Santos Sabando Xavier Adolfo	Izquierda Democrática	Izquierda Democrática	5 May 2022	No bench	Centro Democrático	Expulsion	

== Changed their bench ==
The following assembly members separated from their caucus without abandoning the party for which they were elected:

Assembly member	Party	Original Bench	Date moved	New Bench	Cause	Ref.
Jachero Robalino Washington Elías	Unidos por Pastaza	Partido Social Cristiano	14 May 2021	Acuerdo Nacional	Salida Voluntaria	
Aquino Merchán María del Carmen	Únete	Partido Social Cristiano	14 May 2021	Acuerdo Nacional	Salida Voluntaria	
Saquicela Espinoza Javier Virgilio	Democracia Sí	Acuerdo Nacional	7 April 2022	No bench	Expulsion	
Sánchez Gallegos Bertha Patricia	Pachakutik	Pachakutik	1 April 2021	No bench	Expulsion	
Pazmiño Arregui Mireya Katerine	Pachakutik	Pachakutik	1 April 2021	No bench	Expulsion	
Calo Caisalitin Peter Fernando	Pachakutik	Pachakutik	1 April 2021	No bench	Expulsion	
Pereira Chamba Darwin Stalin	Pachakutik	Pachakutik	1 April 2021	No bench	Expulsion	
Ruiz Jácome Mario Fernando	Pachakutik	Pachakutik	1 April 2021	No bench	Expulsion	
Cabascango Collaguazo José Fernando	Pachakutik	Pachakutik	1 April 2021	No bench	Expulsion	
Moreira Córdova Johanna Nicole	Izquierda Democrática	Izquierda Democrática	22 April 2022	No bench	Expulsion	
Guanoluisa Farinango Amparo Rocío	Izquierda Democrática	Izquierda Democrática	5 May 2022	No bench	Expulsion	
Placencia Tapia Lucía Shadira	Izquierda Democrática	Izquierda Democrática	5 May 2022	No bench	Expulsion	
