= Blanca Sacancela =

Ecuadorian politician

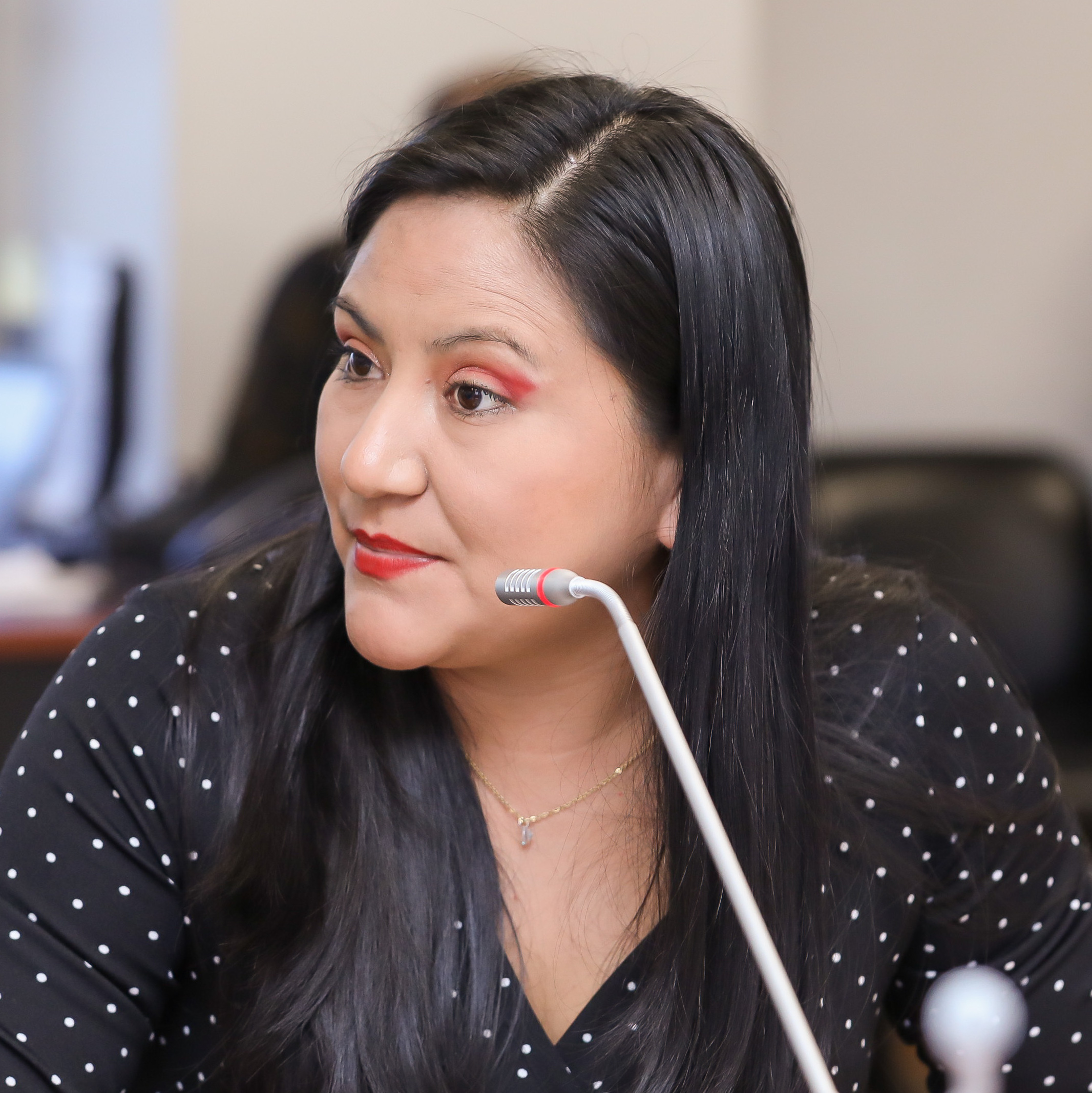
- in 2022
- Occupation: politician
- Known for: member of Ecuador's National Assembly
- Political party: CREO

Blanca Lucrecia Sacancela Quishpe is an Ecuadorian politician who served as a member of Ecuador's National Assembly. She defended the position of President Lasso who in May 2023 had to resign to avoid being impeached. He used a constitutional clause that required every assembly member, including Sacancela, to resign.

== Life ==
Sacancela is a member of Ecuador's National Assembly and a member of the Permanent Commission of the Economic and Tax Regime and its Regulation and Control.

In January 2022, she presented her draft of an Organic Law of Communes and Communities to the National Assembly.

In June 2022, Yeseña Guamaní was called to defend a charge of breach of duties. A hearing was established which included assembly members Wilma Andrade, Ana Belén Cordero, Vanessa Freire and Sacancela.

In March 2023 she failed to get a debate at the National Assembly regarding her proposal that the assembly's members should give 50% of their salaries to the victims of the recent earthquake. She was told that the request should have given at least 24 hours before the proposed vote. In April she defended the position of the President who was being accused of corruption. She said that the President Lasso's enemies were having to count votes and evidence as they did not have enough to vote down the President.

In May 2023 Lasso's lawyer was contesting the case of corruption against President Lasso at the National Assembly. Viviana Veloz led the prosecution and gave evidence against Lasso. Veloz showed videos and copies of letters to the assembly which were intended to prove his guilt. Lasso as President brought in the constitution clause number 148 known as Mutual death in May 2023 when he knew that he was about to be impeached. This required all of the National Assembly members to stand for re-election.

In August 2024, Francesco Tabacchi announced that he was the CREO party's presidential candidate for the 2025 election. Blanca Sacancela was named as the candidate for vice-president. In January 2024 she object to President Daniel Noboa's decision to ban the broadcast of the vice-presidential debate.
