= Maria Aquino =

Ecuadorian politician

María Aquino
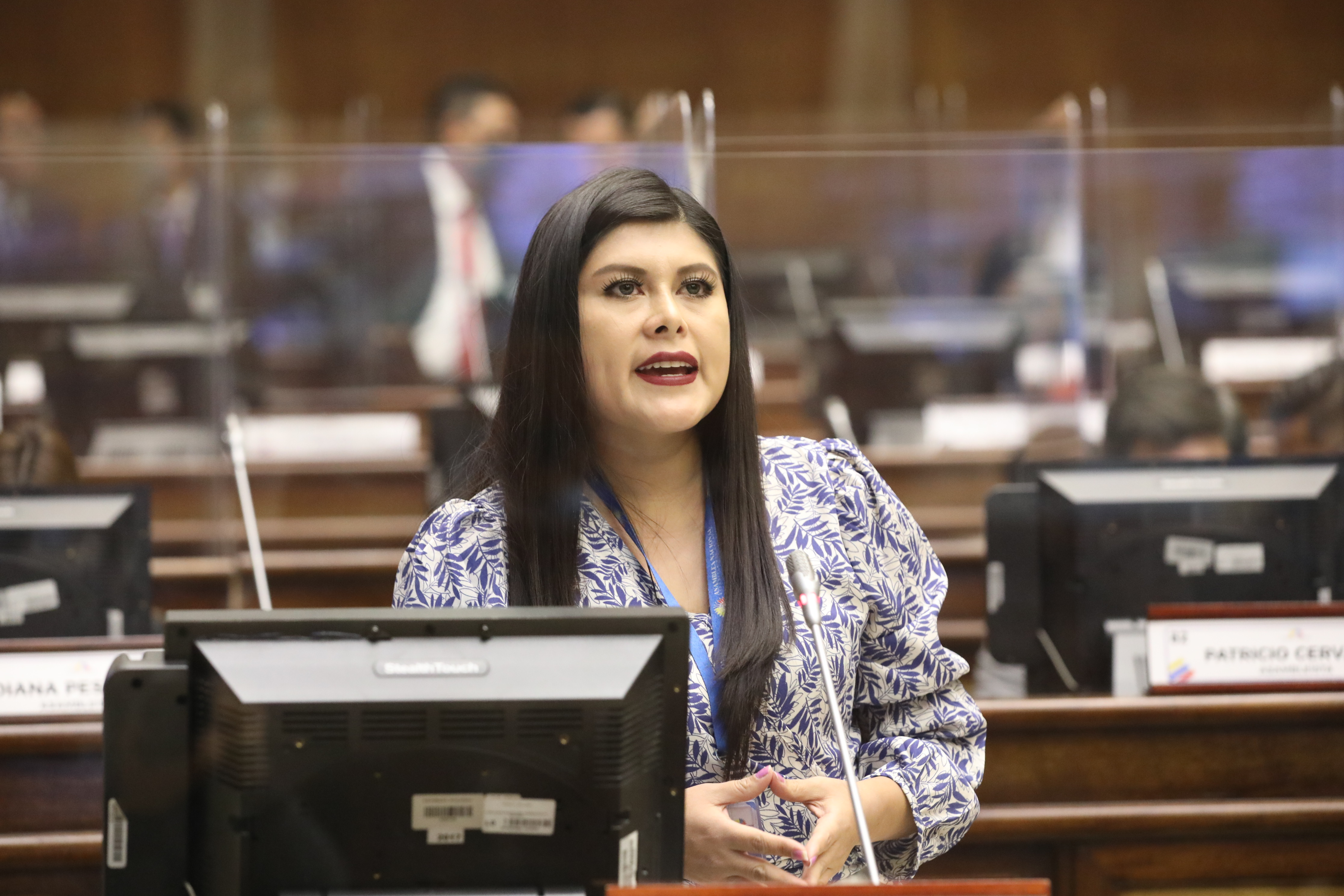
- Born: María del Carmen Aquino Merchan; 20 January 1988 (age 38); Santa Elena
- Occupation: politician
- Known for: member of the National Assembly in 2021 for the Province of Santa Elena
- Political party: Independent

María del Carmen Aquino Merchan is an Ecuadorian National Assembly member who is an Independent. She resigned and successfully stood to be the mayor of Santa Elena in 2022. Her home town had never before elected a woman as mayor.

== Life ==
In 2014 she was a councillor for Santa Elena canton where she was born on 20 January 1988. She went to school at the Carrera Sánchez Bruno school and the Luis Célleri Avilés Educational Unit. Her university studies began at the Escuela Superior Politécnica del Litoral and she has two masters degrees.

She worked at the Santa Elena Peninsula State University as a Professor and at one time was the General Manager of the Santa Elena Municipal Public Tourism Company.

She was elected to the Ecuadorian National Assembly in 2021 for the Province of Santa Elena. Her substitute was Rivet Moreno Simón Bolívar. She became a member of the Assembly's "Permanent Commission on Sovereignty, Integration and Integral Security" and its vice-president.

In 2022 she was an independent assembly member who had in the past been a member of the Christian Social Party. She was aligned with the "Bank of the National Agreement" group, but her, and seven others, loyalty was questioned as that group was in decline. The seven others included other independents like Vanessa Freire.

On September 8, 2022, she resigned from the National Assembly to run for mayor of Santa Elena. In the 2023 sectional elections, she was elected mayor of Santa Elena with 32.58% of the votes for the Citizen Revolution Movement, making her the first woman to reach that position in over 180 years. Among Aquino's main proposals were to start a process of urban regeneration and improve the sewerage system.
