= Nathalie Arias =

Ecuadorian politician

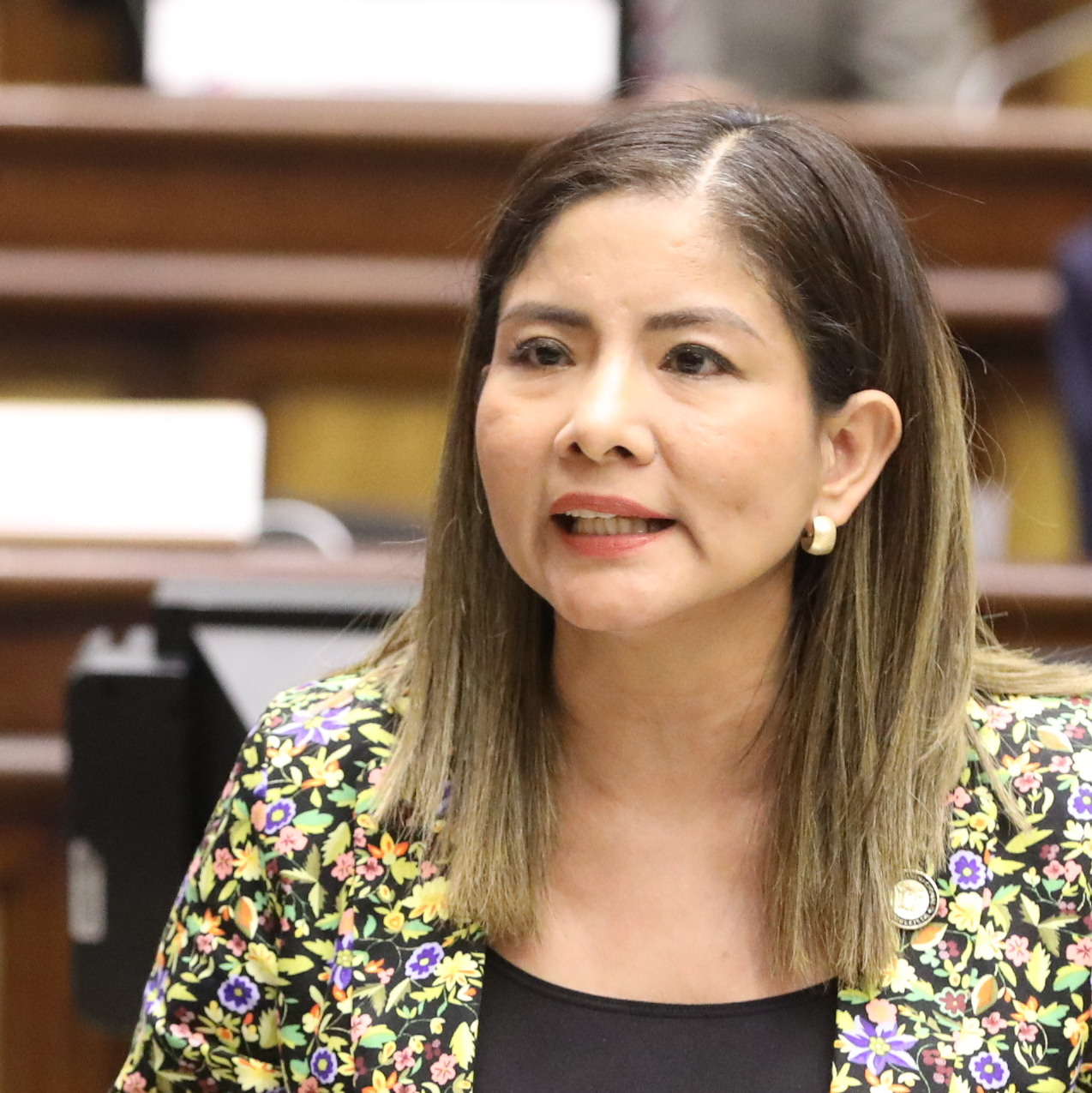
- in 2022
- Other name: Nathalie Andrea Arias Arias
- Occupations: legislative advisor, politician
- Political party: the Creating Opportunities party

Nathalie Andrea Arias Arias is an Ecuadorian politician and member of the Creating Opportunities party (CREO). She was elected in 2021 to Ecuador's 4th National Assembly

== Life ==
She worked for Ecuador's politicians, and from 2007 to 2010, she was in Guayaquil working for the mayor Jaime Nebot. Between 2013 and 2017 she worked for Patricio Donoso who was 2nd Vice President of the Assembly. In 2019 she began working for Rina Campain who was the only woman elected to the assembly from the CREO party. She stood for election with seven years of experience as a legislative advisor.

She is a member of the Creating Opportunities party. She was elected in May 2021 to Ecuador's National Assembly.

In May 2023 she was defending the record of the President of Ecuador Guillermo Lasso. She was saying to the press that although there were many notes for his impeachment in the assembly she predicted that they would fall away. Guillermo Lasso brought in an unusual constitution clause (number 148) known as Mutual death in May 2023 when he knew that he was about to be impeached. This required all of the National Assembly members to stand for re-election.
