= Wilma Andrade =

Ecuadorian politician

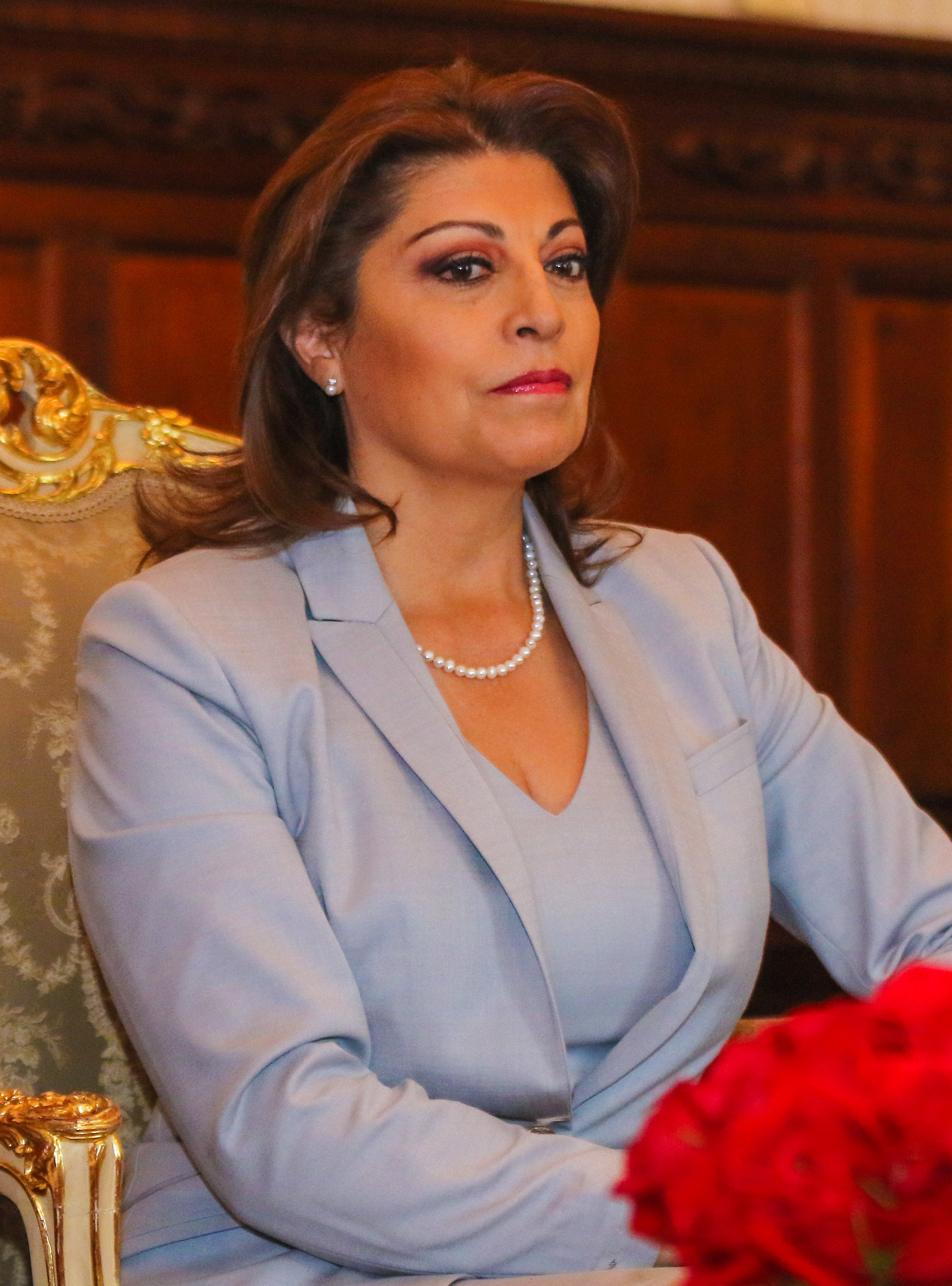

Member of the National Assembly
- Incumbent
- Assumed office 14 May 2017

Member of the National Congress
- In office 5 January 2007 – 30 November 2007

Personal details
- Born: 26 August 1956 (age 69) Quito, Pichincha, Ecuador
- Party: Democratic Left
- Occupation: Activist; comptroller; politician

Wilma Piedad Andrade Muñoz (born 26 August 1956) is an Ecuadorian politician. Since 2017, she has served as a member of the National Assembly, after she was elected as part of the Democratic Left. In 2024 she became Ecuador's ambassador to Spain.

== Biography ==
Andrade was born in Quito, the daughter of Gonzalo Andrade Arteta and Piedad Muñoz de Andrade; she is the second of four siblings. She is married to Marco Morales and is the mother of three children: Marco, Pablo and Lorena.

== Political career ==
The Democratic Left nominated Andrade as a candidate for the Quito Council, a position she held for three consecutive terms, reaching, on her reelection, the largest vote in Quito granted to a woman up to that date. She was unanimously elected as Vice Mayor of the Council of the Metropolitan Municipality of Quito, in two terms from 2002 to 2006.

In 2016, Andrade achieved the re-registration of the Democratic Left, as a political party in Ecuador, as its leader. She was elected president of the Democratic Left, a position she held until 2020. She was also a candidate for National Assembly member for the 2017 legislative election heading her political party where she won a seat for the 2017-2021 legislative term. Her alternate was Diana Pesántez and she would join her at the assembly at the next election.

In 2022, she was welcoming hundreds of food kits from the Chinese embassy for the needy of the province. She had worked with Raisa Corral and the parliamentary liaison group. The Chinese ambassador Chen Guoyou had also helped and 20 wheelchairs were also donated.

In June 2022, Yeseña Guamaní was called to defend a charge of breach of duties. A hearing was established which included assembly members Ana Belén Cordero, Vanessa Freire, Blanca Sacancela and Andrade.

In January 2024, she was appointed by the new President Daniel Noboa to be Ecuador's ambassador to Spain. She formally presented her credentials in March 2024 to the head of protocol María Sebastian de Erice.
