= Eitel Zambrano Ortiz =

Ecuadorian politician

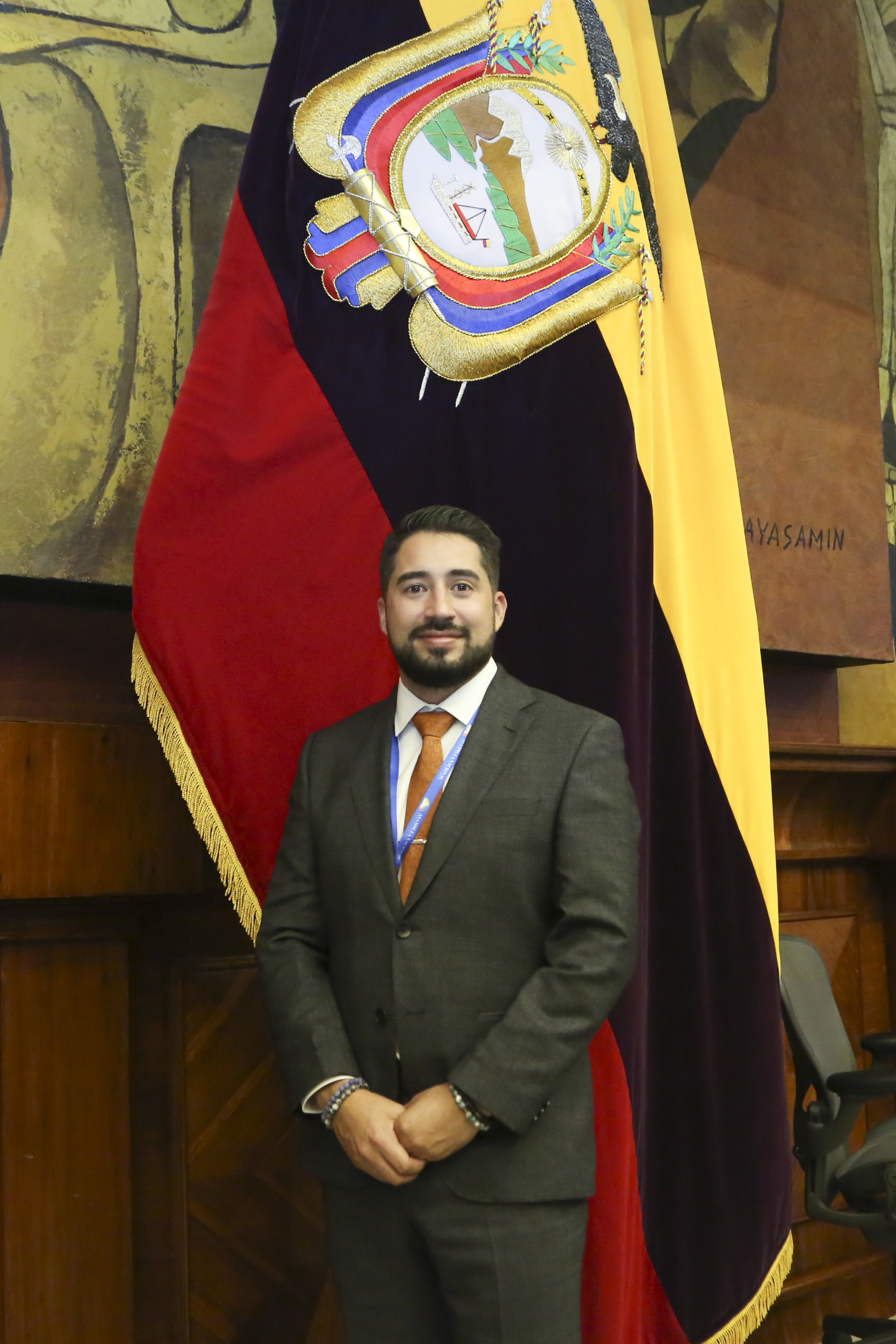
Eitel Zambrano Ortiz in 2021.

Eitel Zambrano Ortiz is an Ecuadorian politician from CREO. He was elected to the National Assembly from the national list in the 2021 Ecuadorian general election.

== See also ==
- Members of the fourth legislative period of the National Assembly of Ecuador
