= Daysi Yuquilema =

Ecuadorian politician

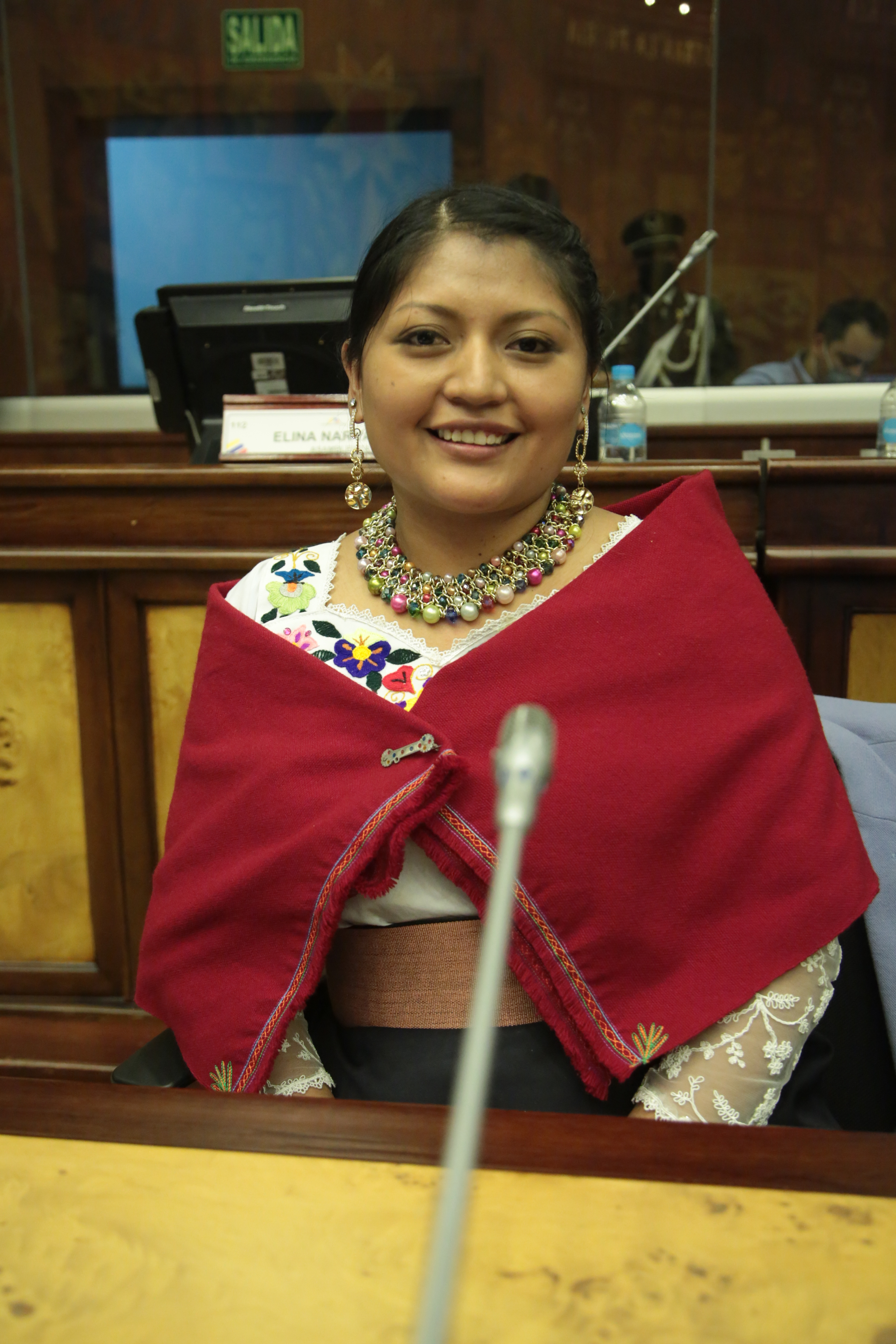
- Yuquilema in 2022
- Other name: Daysi Marilin Yuquilema Chimbolema
- Occupation: politician
- Political party: independent

Daysi Yuquilema is an Ecuadorian politician who is an independent member of the National Assembly of Ecuador representing the Chimborazo Province since 2022.

== Life ==
From 2017 to 20198, Daysi Yuquilema works as a sales assistant for a training company. In 2019, she becomes office manager for the Juan de Velasco Higher Technological Institute.

On 8 September 2022, she becomes a member of the fourth legislative period of the National Assembly to represent the province of Chimborazo. She replaces John Vinueza who is moving on to be a mayoral candidate. She is a member of the permanent commission for Economic, Productive and Microenterprise Development. She is among 20 members of parliament who have not proposed any bill as of May 2023. She was also absent when the parliament voted to impeach Guillermo Lasso but she signed a letter to request his impeachment a few weeks later.

She takes part in the recovery effort following the landslides in the Alausí canton in March 2023.
