= Andrés Arauz =

Ecuadorian politician and economist (born 1985)

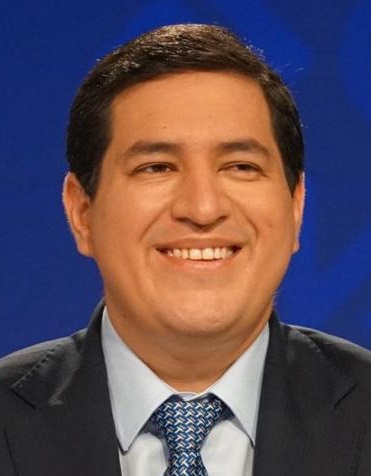
- Arauz in 2021

General Secretary of the Citizen Revolution Movement
- In office 18 November 2023 – 18 January 2026
- President: Luisa González
- Preceded by: David Villamar
- Succeeded by: Evelyn Zambrano

President of the Citizen Revolution Movement
- In office 21 December 2020 – 24 May 2021
- Preceded by: Vanessa Freire
- Succeeded by: Raisa Corral

Minister of Knowledge and Human Talent
- In office 25 March 2015 – 25 April 2017
- President: Rafael Correa
- Preceded by: Guillaume Long
- Succeeded by: Raúl Pérez Torres (Note: As Minister of Culture and Heritage)

Personal details
- Born: 6 February 1985 (age 41) Quito, Ecuador
- Party: Citizen Revolution Movement
- Other political affiliations: Union for Hope
- Height: 1.73 m (5 ft 8 in)
- Education: University of Michigan (BS in social science); Latin American Faculty of Social Sciences (MA); National Autonomous University of Mexico (PHD)

Andrés Arauz Galarza (born 6 February 1985) is an Ecuadorian politician and economist who served as the General Secretary of the Citizen Revolution Movement (RC) since 2023. He previously served as president of RC from 2020 to 2021, and as Minister of Knowledge and Human Talent under Rafael Correa from 2015 to 2017.

Arauz was a candidate for president of Ecuador in the 2021 general election as a progressive candidate. He narrowly lost the run-off election to conservative banker Guillermo Lasso, after winning the first round. He ran again as vice president in the 2023 election with Luisa González, but was once again defeated.

== Background ==
Andrés Arauz started his career as a public servant in 2009 at the Central Bank of Ecuador. He was general director of banking at the Central Bank from 2011 to 2013. He was later appointed deputy minister of planning and general director of national procurement. In March 2015, he was appointed Minister of Knowledge and Human Talent in the government of Rafael Correa, replacing Guillaume Long. From this position he led the coordination and supervision of the execution of the politics, programs, and projects of the Ministries of Education, Culture, Higher Education, Science, and Technology. Among the outcomes of these projects were improved technological independence in the country, the use of free software, and the development of free knowledge.

He also headed the Ministry of Culture for a brief period of time due to the resignation of Raúl Vallejo.

In 2017, when Lenín Moreno became president, Arauz turned to an academic career, co-founding the Observatory of Dollarization dedicated to disseminating essays and investigations on the subject of dollarization of various national economies and its effects. He also began doctoral studies on financial economics at the National Autonomous University of Mexico.

He is a member of the Executive Council of Progressive International.

== Political career ==
=== 2021 presidential candidacy ===
Allies of former president Rafael Correa were prevented from registering a new political party after Moreno became president. As a result, a political coalition called Unión por la Esperanza (UNES), was formed, which includes the political organisations Citizen Revolution Movement and Democratic Center Movement.

On 18 August 2020, UNES announced Arauz as its candidate for President of Ecuador in the elections scheduled for 7 February 2021. Accompanying Arauz as running mate would have been Rafael Correa, who had been president from 2007 to 2017. However, his acceptance of the position was rejected by the National Electoral Council, which argued that it was mere procedure rather than politically motivated, as Correa, who resided in Belgium, refused to return to the country and serve an 8-year prison sentence for corruption. The courts barred Correa from holding a political position for 25 years.

Arauz won the first round of the presidential election with almost 33% of votes. He faced banker Guillermo Lasso in the runoff on 11 April. On the eve of the run-off, Arauz was slightly ahead of candidate Lasso in opinion polls, leading by a margin of 1% of 50% against Lasso's 49%. Lasso defeated Arauz in the run-off.

=== 2023 vice presidential candidacy ===
Arauz ran for Vice President of Ecuador in the 2023 election but was not successful as the running mate of Luisa González. He had previously ruled out another presidential candidacy.

Following the election, Luisa González was elected President of the Citizen Revolution Movement on 18 November 2023, succeeding Francisco Hidalgo. Arauz was designated as party general secretary shortly afterwards.

== Notes ==
Political offices
Preceded by Guillaume Long	Minister of Knowledge and Human Talent; 2015–2017	Succeeded by Raúl Pérez Torres as Minister of Culture and Heritage
Party political offices
Preceded by Vanessa Freire	President of the Citizen Revolution Movement; 2020–2021	Succeeded by Raisa Corral
New political party	RC nominee for President of Ecuador; 2021	Most recent
New alliance	Union for Hope nominee for President of Ecuador; 2021	Most recent
