= Margarita Arotingo =

Ecuadorian politician

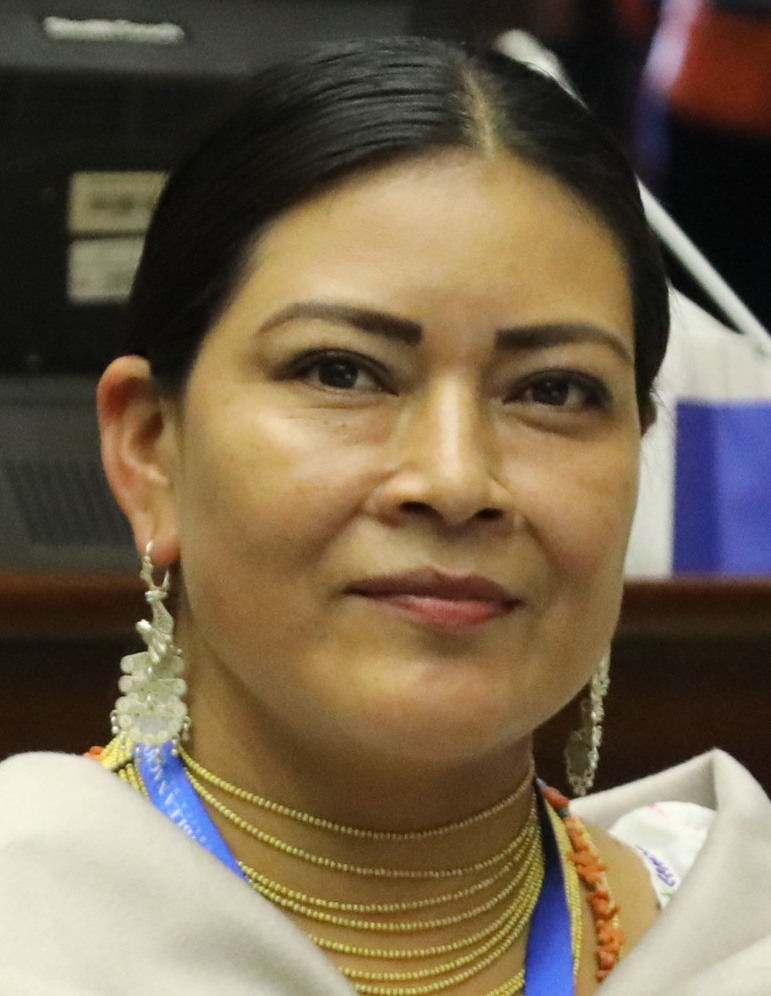
- in 2023
- Born: 1978 (age 47–48); Cotacachi Volcano
- Occupations: lawyer and politician
- Known for: member of the National Assembly
- Political party: Citizen Revolution Movement

Margarita Arotingo is an Ecuadorian lawyer and politician, who became a member of the National Assembly in 2023 for the Citizen Revolution Movement (RC).

== Life ==
Arotingo comes from the Kichwa people of Otavalo and was born near the Cotacachi volcano.

She holds master's degree in popular and solidarity economy and finance and is a lawyer by training.

She worked in different capacities for the Ministry of Education, the Ministry of Justice and Human Rights.

In 2022, Arotingo was part of the executive council one of biggest organisation (Fenocin) leading to the 2022 Ecuadorian protests and was part of the negotiations with the Ecuadorian government.

At the 2023 Ecuadorian general elections, she is a candidate for the Citizen revolution movement as the indigenous movement is unable to form a party. She is elected. She is a member of the Permanent Commission for Comprehensive Protection of Girls, Boys and Adolescents.
