= Union for Hope =

Political coalition in Ecuador for the 2021 election

Union for Hope Unión por la Esperanza
- Abbreviation: UNES
- Leader: Rafael Correa
- National Coordinator: Liliana Durán Aguilar
- Founder: Rafael Correa
- Founded: 8 July 2020; 5 years ago
- Legalised: 29 October 2020; 5 years ago
- Dissolved: 17 May 2023; 2 years ago
- Headquarters: Quito
- Student wing: Jóvenes UNES
- Women's wing: Permanent Forum of Ecuadorian Women
- Ideology: Socialism of the 21st century; Democratic socialism; Left-wing populism; Progressivism; Anti-imperialism; Correism
- Political position: Left-wing
- Colors: Orange Red; White; Blue

Website
- https://unionporlaesperanza.com/

Union for Hope (Spanish: Unión por la Esperanza, UNES) was a political coalition in Ecuador for the 2021 Ecuadorian general election. Political groups from the left-wing participated, with only the Democratic Center Movement being officially on the ballot, to sponsor the presidential candidacy of Andrés Arauz for the 2021 presidential election.

Several social groups, provincial movements, and the Citizen Revolution Movement, of national scope not registered in the National Electoral Council (CNE), were also affiliate and in opposition to the government of Lenín Moreno. For the 2021 legislative election, alliances were formed in several provinces, together with the different local movements, distributing the candidates between movements.

== Formation ==
On 7 April 2020, the leader of the Citizen Revolution Movement Rafael Correa was sentenced to 8 years in prison and 25 years without holding any public office for bribery dating from 2012 and 2016, making it impossible for him to run in 2021. Likewise, the National Electoral Council removes the Social Commitment Force Movement from the electoral register due to a report issued by the State Comptroller General that warned of irregularities with the signatures of its adherents at the time of registration, and that therefore they will not participate in the 2021 presidential elections.

In August 2020, due to the suspension of the party, the formation of the Union for Hope was promoted, together with the Democratic Center Movement of the former prefect of Guayas, Jimmy Jairala. This platform would later manage to announce the candidacy of Andrés Arauz for the presidency of the Republic and with Rafael Correa as his vice-presidency running mate weeks later. However, his acceptance of the candidacy was rejected by the National Electoral Council as it was a personal, face-to-face and non-delegable procedure, as Correa was a fugitive from justice outside of the country since he resides in Belgium. However, the candidates for the National Assembly and the Andean Parliament had no setback in accepting their candidacies, under the auspices of the Movement Center Democratic List, with Pierina Correa, sister of the former president, leading the list of national assembly members. In addition to Correa, other figures of the Citizen Revolution such as Sofía Espín, Marcela Holguín, Pabel Muñoz, Amapola Naranjo, Verónica Arias, Ronny Aleaga, among others, sought re-election in the 2021 elections. Paola Cabezas was one of those elected in May 2021 and she took over the Presidency of Union for Hope from Sofía Espín who had resigned.

=== 2021 Ecuador general election ===
The 11 April 2021 presidential election run-off vote ended in a win for conservative former banker, Guillermo Lasso of CREO, taking 52.4% of the vote compared to 47.6% of the candidate of Union for Hope, left-wing economist Andrés Arauz, supported by exiled former president, Rafael Correa.

=== Presidency of Guillermo Lasso ===
In May 2023, the party was one of the proponents of impeachement proceedings against Guillermo Lasso. Expecting his imminent removal from office, Lasso invoked Muerte cruzada, a mechanism that dissolves the National Assembly and prompts new elections for parliament and president to be held in August. Paola Cabezas, an assembly member for the party, stated that they will challenge the invocation at the Constitutional Court of Ecuador, while also remaining optimistic about a political solution to the crisis being reached via the upcoming elections.

== Members ==
- Democratic Center (National)
- Social Commitment Force (National)
- Citizen Revolution Movement (rejected by the CNE)
- Permanent Forum of Ecuadorian Women
- Confederation of Peasant Indigenous Peoples and Organizations of Ecuador (FEI)
- Rural and Productive Force (FRP)
- National Coalition for the Homeland (CNP)
- National Patriotic Front (FPN)
- SurGente citizen collective

== Election results ==
=== National Assembly ===
Election	Votes	%	Seats	+/–	Status
2021	2,584,595	32.21 (#1)	49 / 137	▲49	Opposition

=== President ===
Election	Candidates		First round		Second round		Status
Election	President	Vice President	Votes	%	Votes	%	Status
2021	Andrés Arauz	Carlos Rabascall	3,033,791	32.72	4,236,515	47.64	Lost

== See also ==
- National Agreement Movement
