= Geraldine Weber =

Ecuadorian politician

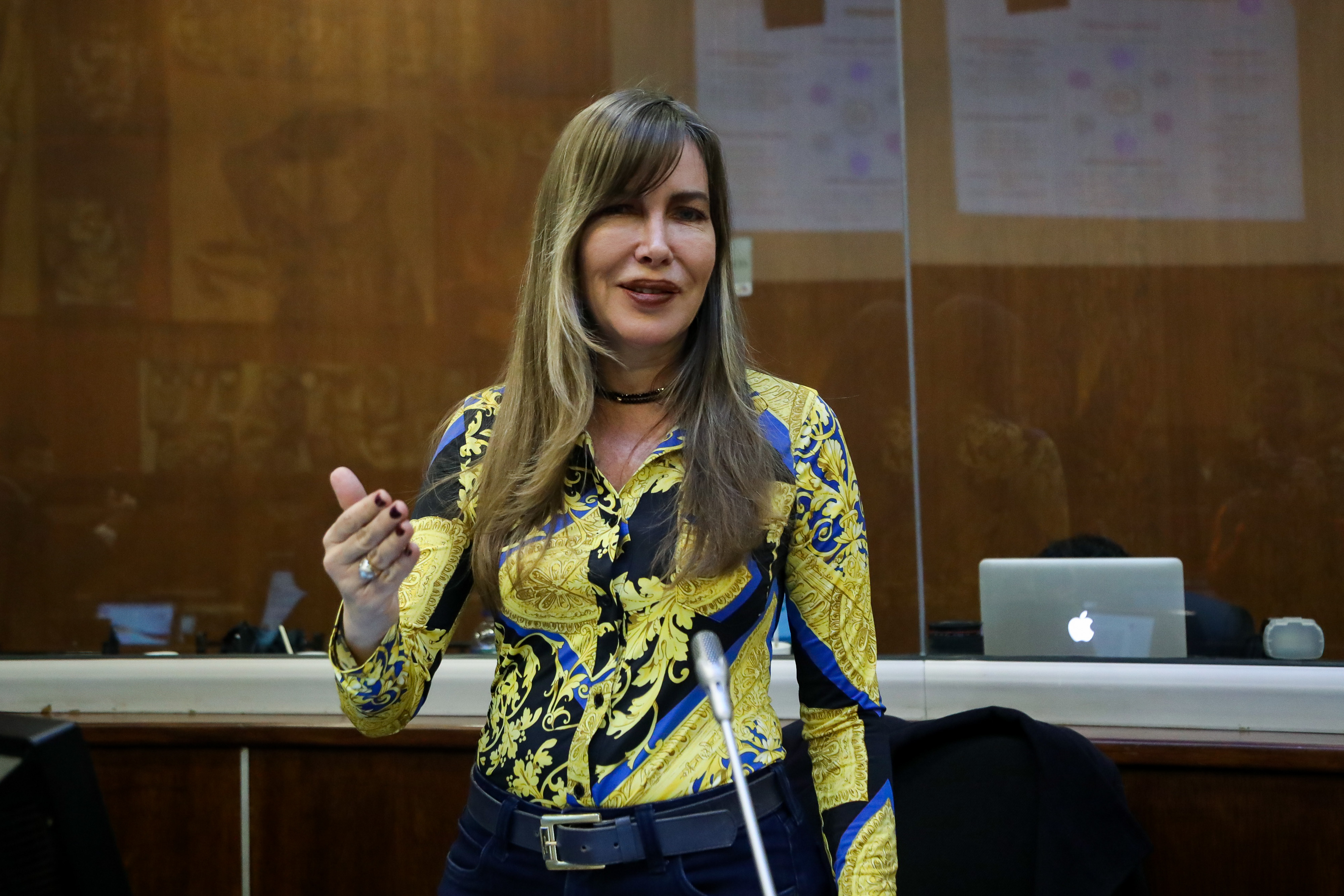
- Occupation: politician
- Known for: she is a members of the fourth National Assembly of Ecuador
- Political party: PSC
- Spouse: same man twice

Geraldine Weber Moreno is an Ecuadorian politician. She is a member of the National assembly representing Guaya. She was a member of the Social Christian Party (PSC) until 2023 when disagreements over support over the impeachment of President Laslo led to her resignation.

== Political career ==
She is opposed to the legalisation of abortion in Ecuador even where it results from a rape.

In June 2021 she one of the people calling for action about the "terrorism" in Guayaquil and other cities.

In 2023 she, Javier Ortiz, Elina Narváez and Karen Noblecilla left the Social Democratic Party over the vote about the impeachment of President Laslo. This was a significant number as there were only twelve left. Weber was not convinced by the evidence against Laslo and she said that had been forced to allow her alternate to vote in her place.

== Private life ==
Weber married the same man when she was 19 and when she was 39. The second marriage followed five years apart after a divorce. They found the reconciliation difficult and they gave talks on how to resolve marital differences after they were happy again.
