= Diana Pesántez =

Ecuadorian politician

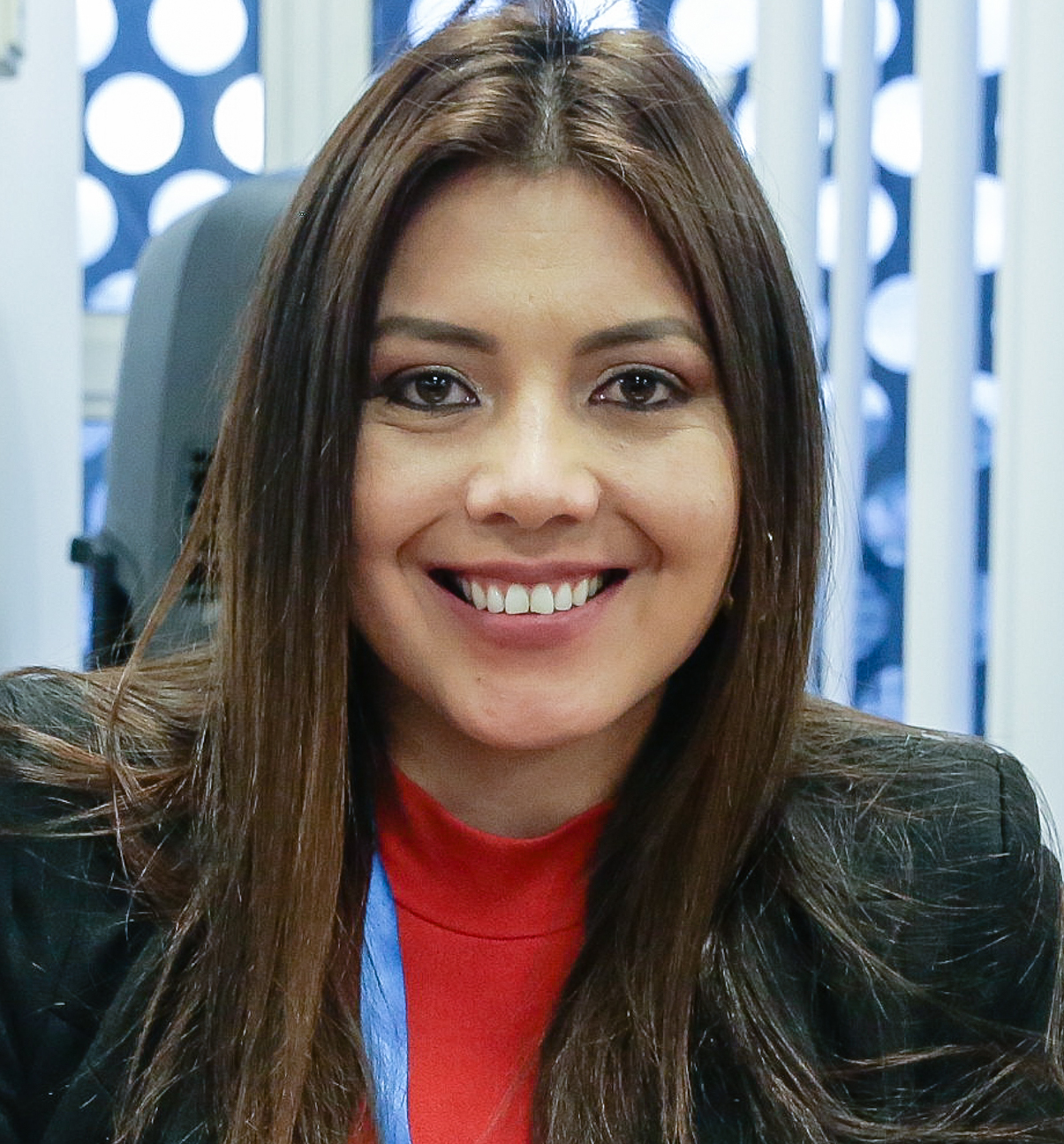
- Other name: Diana Elizabeth Pesántez Salto
- Occupation: politician
- Political party: BAN

Diana Elizabeth Pesántez Salto is an Ecuadorian politician who took up her position at the National Assembly three days after the 2021 election. She is a member of the BAN party and she represents Azuay Province.

== Life ==
She comes from Cuenca.

In 2017 to 2021 she was the alternate for Wilma Andrade where she was an active legislator. In the 2021 election she was the alternate for Marcelo Cabrera. On election Cabrera became the Minister of Transport and Pesántez took up her role representing Azuay at Ecuador's 4th National Assembly on the 24th May.

She became a permanent Member of the Permanent Commission for Economic, Productive Development and Microenterprise.

In November 2022 she joined a group of fifteen assembly members who intend to investigate the link between narcotics and politicians in Ecuador. They were requesting information including the names of assembly members who have been stopped from entering the United States. Other members included Fernando Villavicencio, Ricardo Vanegas, Consuelo Vega, Sofía Sánchez, Gissela Molina and Mariano Curicama. They are from different parties but several parties are notably not represented.
