= Rina Campain =

Ecuadorian politician

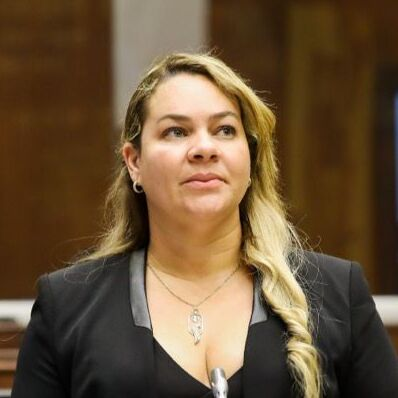
- in 2022
- Born: Rina Asunción Campain Brambilla c.1983
- Occupation: politician
- Known for: Member of Ecuador's National Assembly
- Political party: CREO

Rina Asunción Campain Brambilla is an Ecuadorian politician for the Creating Opportunities (CREO) party. She is a member of the National Assembly and a member of the Legislative Administration Council (CAL).

== Life ==
She was born in about 1983.

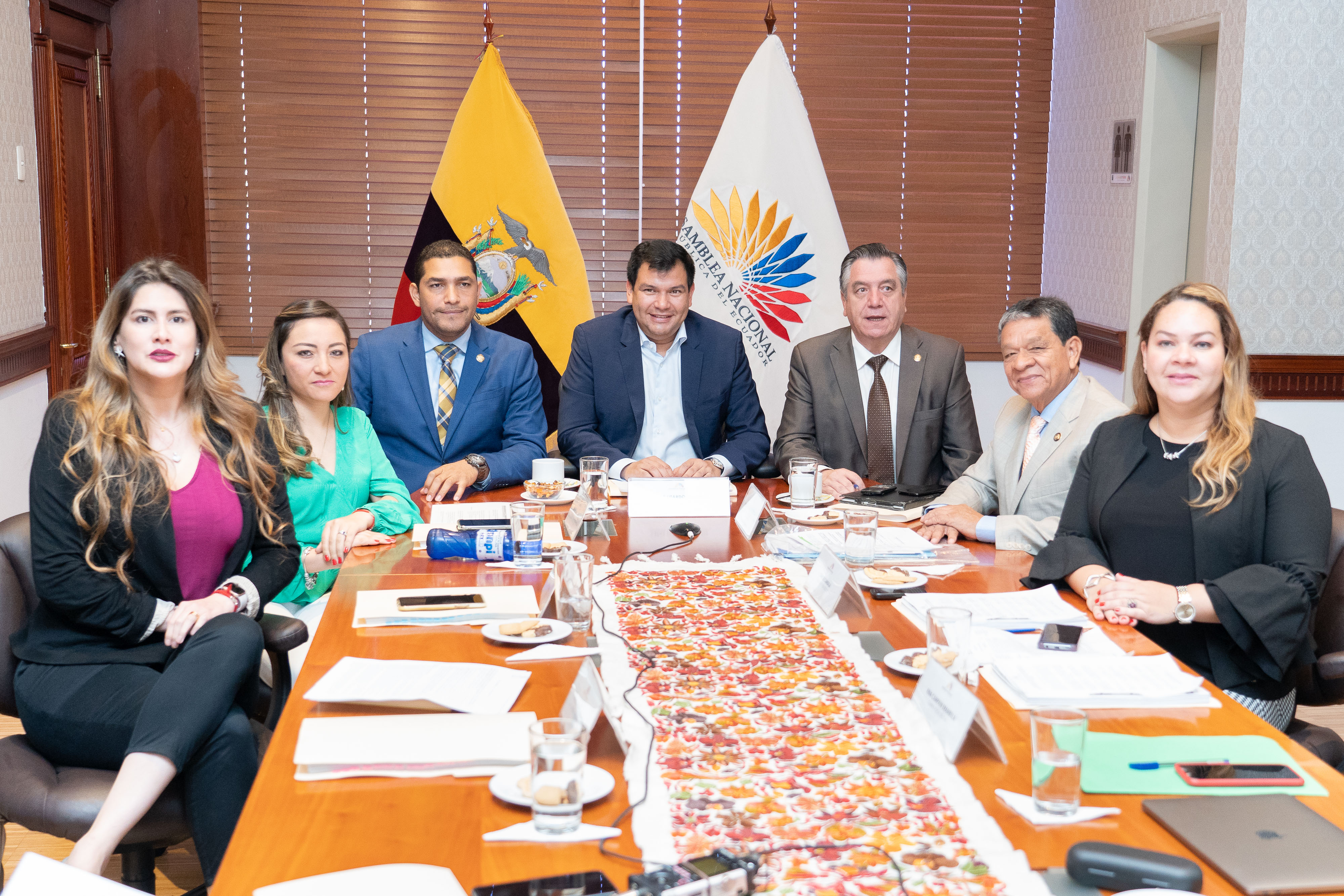
Session of CAL. Left to right are Cristina Reyes, Ana Belen Marin, Cesar Solorzano, Cesar Litardo, Patricio Donoso, Carlos Cambala and Rina Campain

During the time when Campain was the only woman who was both in the Creating Opportunities party and in the National Assembly she had Nathalie Arias on her staff as a legislative advisor. Arias would go on to join her as a fellow assembly member after Campain was reelected in 2021.

Campain represents the Province of Esmeraldas. and she was elected to be the President of the Permanent Specialized Commission on the Right to Work and Social Security from 2021 to 2023.
