= Raisa Corral =

Ecuadorian politician

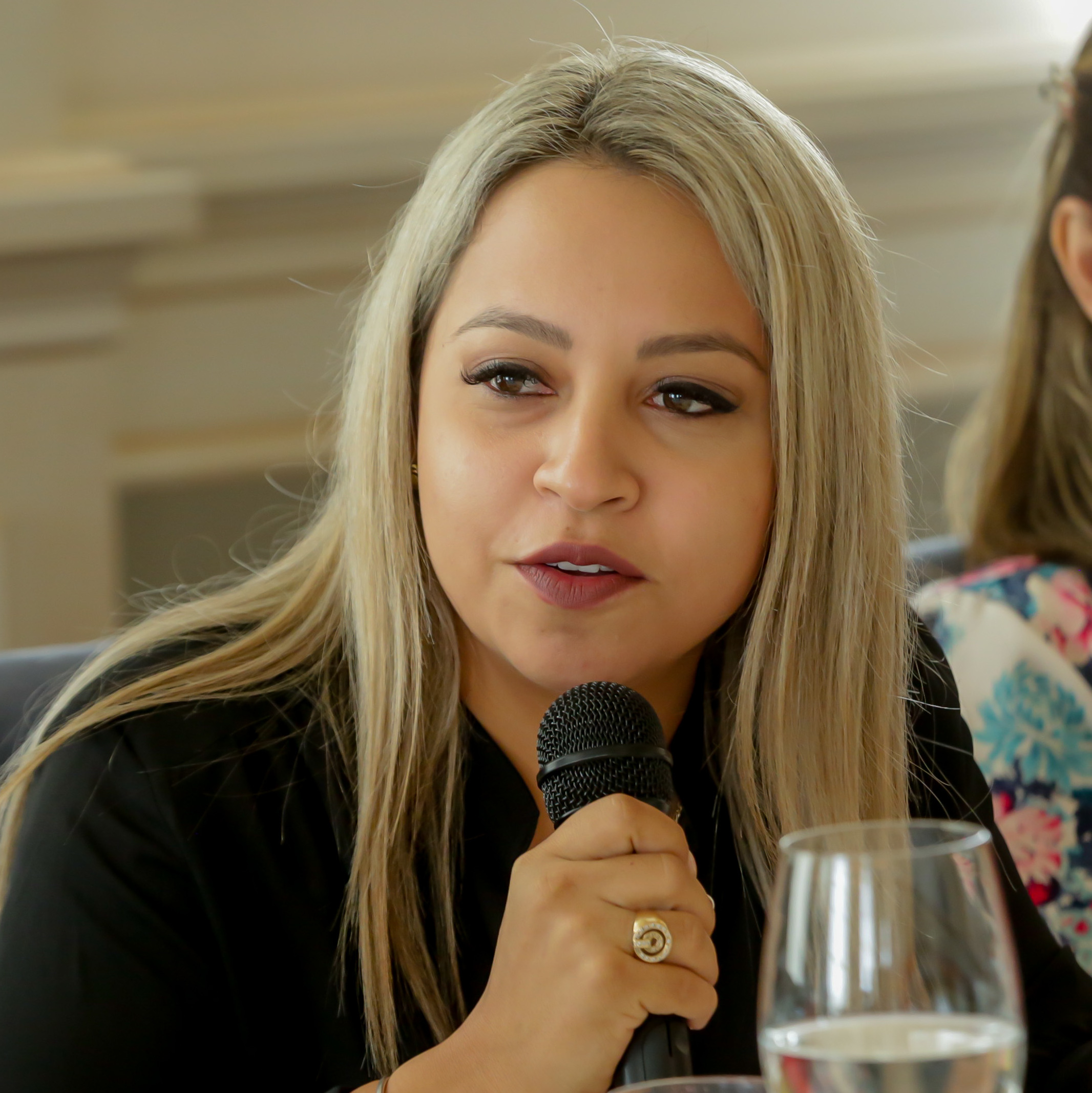
- Born: c.1988
- Education: Eloy Alfaro Lay University of Manabí
- Occupation: politician
- Political party: Citizen Revolution Movement

Raisa Irina Corral Alava is an Ecuadorian politician. She is a member of the National Assembly for the Province of Manabi. In 2021 she was briefly the President of the Citizen Revolution Movement.

== Life ==
Corral was born in about 1988 into an agricultural family. She studied law at the Eloy Alfaro Lay University of Manabí. In 2019 she was a Technical Director of Professional Development at Ecuador's Ministry of Education.

She is a member of the Citizen Revolution Movement and she was elected to the National Assembly in 2021 to represent Manabi.

In 2021, the Citizen Revolution Movement's leader, Andrés Arauz, and Presidential candidate to be the nation's president was defeated. He resigned after the defeat and Corral was his replacement. She served until August 2021. She was succeeded by Marcela Aguiñaga as president of the Citizen Revolution Movement.

In May 2022, she was welcoming hundreds of food kits from the Chinese embassy for the needy of the province negotiated by Wilma Andrade with the support of Corral who serves on the Ecuador-China Interparliamentary Friendship Group. The Chinese ambassador Chen Guoyou had also helped and 20 wheelchairs were additionally donated. In June she proposed a change in the law to further protect animals like cats and dogs. Her document was supported by fifty legislators. In 2022 it was necessary for someone like the owner of the animals to pay for a private prosecution again someone being cruel to a domestic animal. The change she proposes will allow the state to take action without having to have someone raise a court case.

Political offices
Party political offices
Preceded by Andrés Arauz	President of the Citizen Revolution Movement; 2021–2021	Succeeded by Marcela Aguiñaga
