= Yachay University =

University in Ecuador

Coordinates: 0.4167°N 78.1989°W

Yachay Tech University
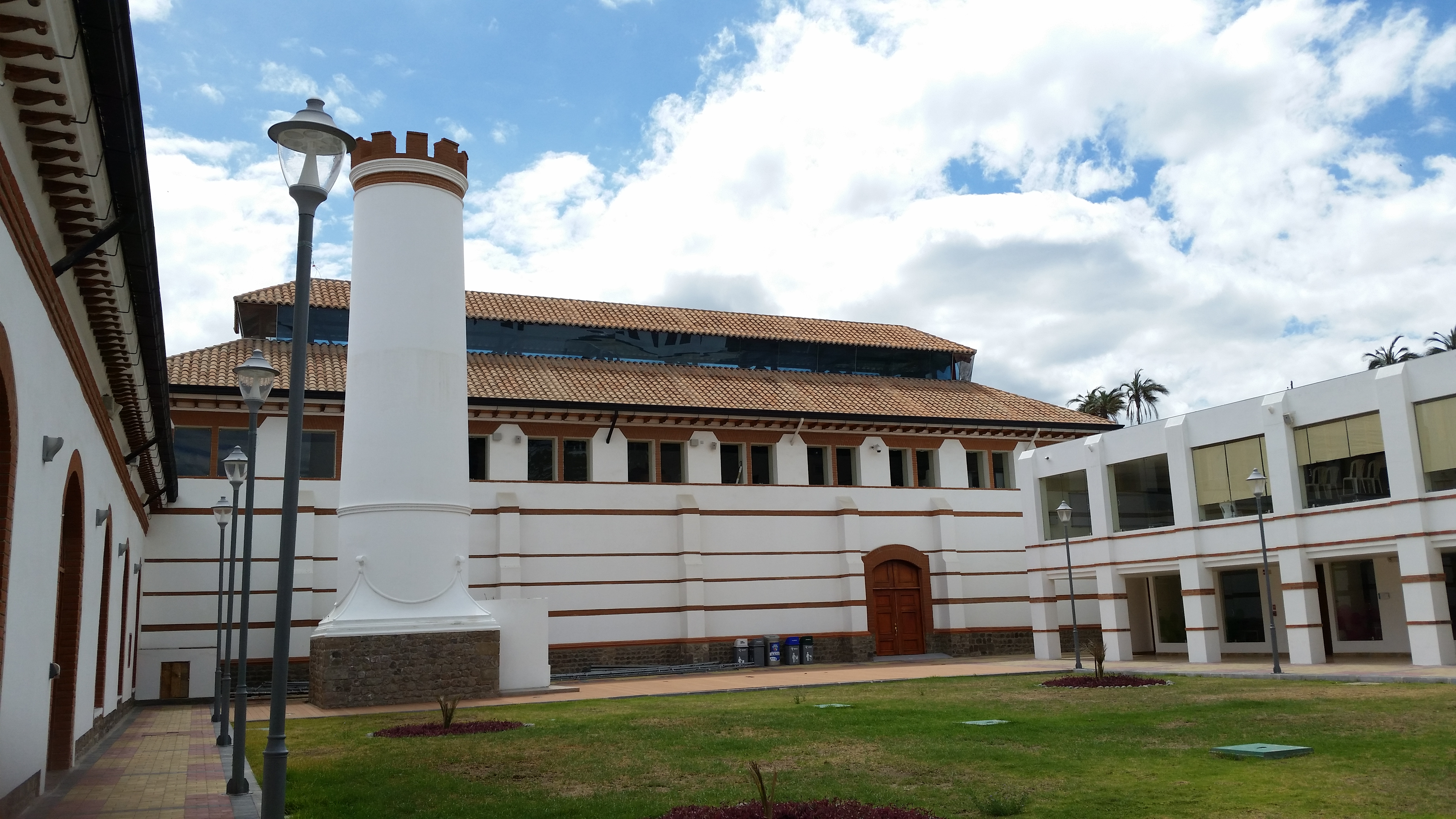
- Type: Public university
- Established: 2014; 12 years ago
- Affiliations: SDSN, KM3NeT, CEDIA, REDU
- President: Andrés Rosales Acosta, Ph.D.
- Vice-Chancellor: Manuel Caetano Ph.D.
- Students: 1429
- Undergraduates: 1429
- Postgraduates: 0
- Location: Hacienda San José s/n y Proyecto Yachay (Ciudad del conocimiento Yachay), Urcuquí, Imbabura Province, Ecuador
- Colours: White Blue
- Website: yachaytech.edu.ec/en/
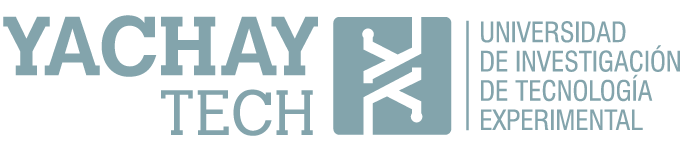

Yachay Tech University (Universidad Yachay Tech) is a public university in San Miguel de Urcuquí, Imbabura Province, Ecuador. The university is part of Yachay City of Knowledge, a project under development by the government of Ecuador to establish a hub for technological innovation and knowledge intensive businesses. The university opened in the first quarter of 2014 as one of the emblematic institutions in Ecuador. The word Yachay is a Kichwa word that means "knowledge". Yachay Tech is a research oriented institution.

The curriculum focuses on the scientific-technological area, and one of its main components is dual training, where students combine academic learning in the classroom with work practices in the company.

== History ==
Yachay Tech University was planned during the government of the Ecuadorian former President Rafael Correa in 2013 as one of four 'Emblematic Universities', as part of his political project The Citizens' Revolution. However, it is a non-political entity. The university collaborates with public and private research institutions.

On March 31, 2014, it began its academic work, with 187 students from 22 provinces of Ecuador who obtained a place in the National Exam for Higher Education (currently called the EAES exam), entrance exams to the public higher education system from this country.

The Government of Ecuador invested more than one billion dollars in the construction project of the university, initially directed by the public company Siembra EP (Previously Yachay EP). However, of every US$100 invested in such a project, less than US$9 went to the university. In 6 years, Yachay Tech earmarked approximately US$90M.

According to the Public Expenditure Observatory of Ecuador, the budget of the universities in 2020 was US$1.2 billion, of which US$16.6 million went to Yachay Tech. It placed Yachay in the 23rd position out of 31 higher education institutions that the state finances. With just 1.43% of budget allocation, the university positioned itself as the best in Ecuador for research issues. Yachay Tech, the National Polytechnic School (EPN) and the San Francisco de Quito University (USFQ), lead the country's research podium according to Nature.

By 2040, Yachay Tech plans to have 10,000 students. It was created as a science and technology development university. Its creation file mentions the objectives of promoting scientific research, technological development, and disseminating knowledge. It prioritizes the training of students for scientific activities.

A planned research network was the National Supercomputing Network, developed around Yachay Tech's supercomputer, Quinde I.

In May 2018, the Secretary of Higher Education, Science, Technology and Innovation (Senescyt), Augusto Barrera, apparently ratified his commitment to "resize, give tranquillity, continuity and enhance" the university.

In 2022 the National Assembly member Ana Belén Cordero was accused of libel after saying that the former manager of the university had misspent money. At that time the university had cost over US$600 million since was created eight years before. Her words were in relation to recent report by the Comptroller General made to the Assembly's Oversight Commission.

=== Nature Index - Top 10 institutions from Ecuador between 1 May 2020 - 1 April 2021 ===
Institution		Count	Share
1.	National Polytechnic School (EPN)	48	1.81
2.	Pontifical Catholic University of Ecuador (PUCE)	7	1.58
3.	Yachay Tech University (YT)	5	1.58
4.	Universidad San Francisco de Quito (USFQ)	53	1.46
5.	Universidad de las Américas (UDLA)	5	1.02
6.	Universidad del Azuay (UDA)	1	0.15
7.	University of Cuenca (UCUENCA)	2	0.14
8.	Universidad Técnica del Norte (UTN)	2	0.08
9.	EcoMinga Foundation (EcoMinga)	1	0.07
10.	Universidad Técnica de Machala (UTMACH)	1	0.06

== Study programs ==
The university consists of five schools.. The academic offer, the lines of research, and the training of the students correspond to the areas that the Ecuadorian government has detected as priorities for the change of the country's productive matrix.

University schools with careers at disposal:

School of Biological Sciences and Engineering

- Biology
- Biomedical Engineering

School of Chemical Sciences and Engineering

Dean: Dr. Vivian Morera

- Chemistry
- Materials Engineering

School of Earth Sciences, Energy and Environment

Dean: Dr. Vladimir Bonilla

- Geology
- Food Agroindustry

School of Mathematical and Computational Sciences

Dean: Dr. Franklin Camacho

- Mathematics
- Information Technologies

School of Physical Sciences and Nanotechnology

Dean: Dr. Gema González Vázquez

- Physics
- Nanotechnology Engineering
- Master in Applied Physics with Major in Nanotechnology (Postgraduate totally in English)

Joint training with the National University of Education:

- Experimental Sciences

== Administration and organization ==
Board of Trustees (2019):

- Andrés Rosales, Ph.D. (President)
- Luis Campaña (Legal Secretary)
- Judith Vanegas, Ph.D. Academic Vice Rector
- Manuel Caetano, Ph.D. Vice Rector for Research

Academic leadership:

- Rector: Andrés Rosales, Ph.D.
- Vice Chancellor of Research and Innovation: Manuel Caetano, Ph.D., since 2023.
- Dean of the School Biological Sciences and Engineering: Hortensia Rodriguez Ph.D.
- Dean of the School of Chemical Sciences and Engineering: Vivian Morera Ph.D.
- Dean of the School of Earth Sciences, Energies and Environment: Vladimir Bonilla Ph.D.
- Dean of the School of Mathematical Sciences and Information Technology: Franklin Camacho Ph.D.
- Dean of the School of Physical Sciences and Nanotechnology: Gema Gonzalez Ph.D
