= Pierina Correa =

Ecuadorian architect and politician

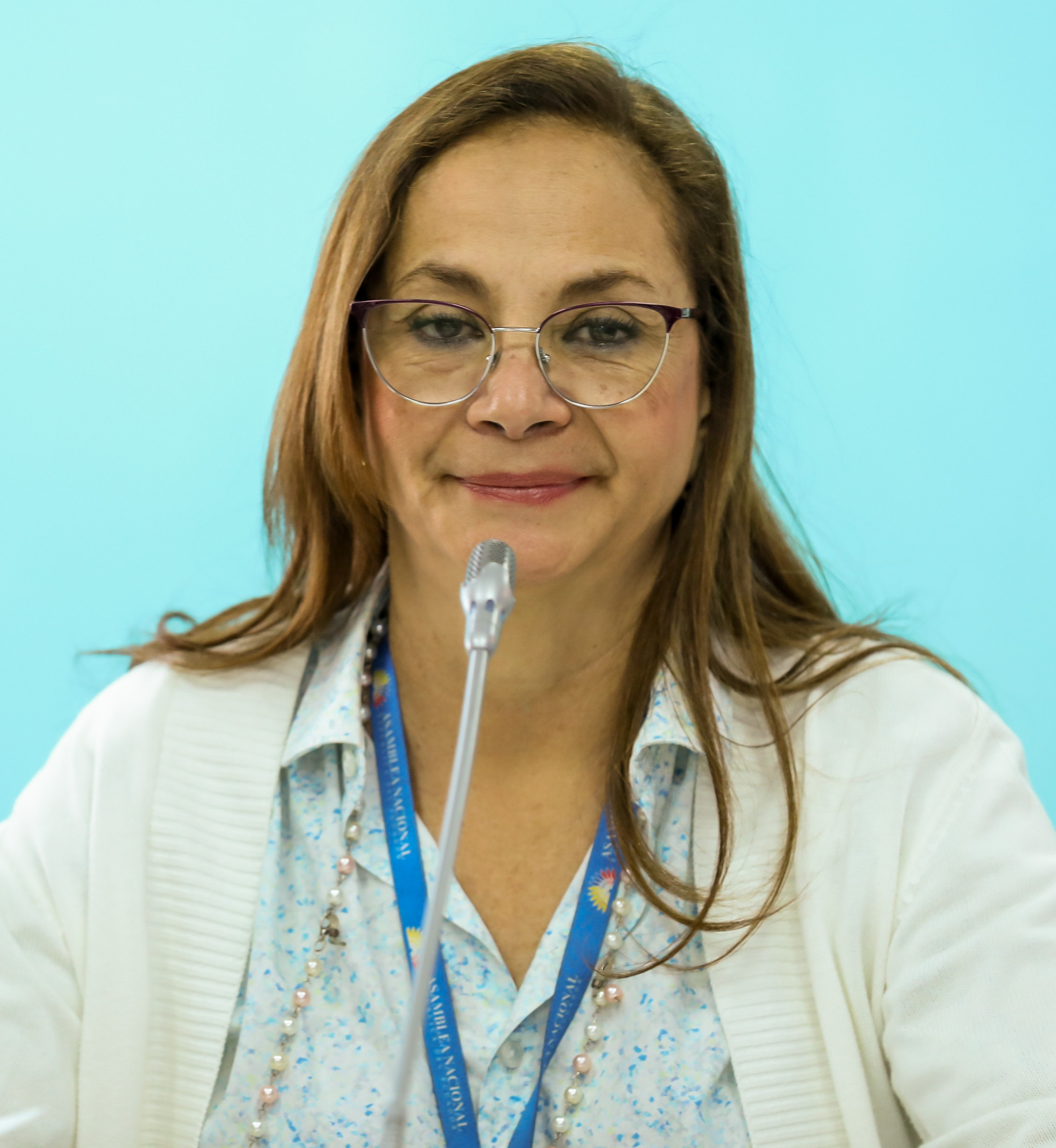

Member of the National Assembly
- Incumbent
- Assumed office 14 May 2021

Personal details
- Born: 30 May 1961 (age 65) Guayaquil, Guayas, Ecuador
- Party: Social Commitment Force (since 2018); PAIS Alliance (2009-2018)
- Occupation: Architect; politician

Pierina Sara Mercedes Correa Delgado (born 30 May 1961) is an Ecuadorian architect and politician, sister of the former president of Ecuador Rafael Correa and a National Assembly member for Union for Hope who was re-elected in 2023.

== Biography ==
Correa was born in Guayaquil. Her father was Rafael Correa Icaza, born in Los Ríos Province on 23 March 1935. Her mother is Norma Delgado Rendón, also from the Vinces Canton (Los Ríos Province), born on 1 September 1939. Correa has three siblings: Fabricio, Rafael and Bernarda Correa. She graduated in 2002 as an architect from the Universidad Católica de Santiago de Guayaquil, and she also has a Master's Degree in High Performance Sports from the Universidad Católica San Antonio de Murcia and the Spanish Olympic Committee.

== Political career ==
In 2009, Correa was an unsuccessful candidate for the Prefect of Guayas by the PAIS Alliance. In 2019, she was a candidate for Prefect of Guayas for the Social Commitment Force in the 2019 Guayas provincial elections, where she was second with 17.4% of the votes.

In 2011, Correa was elected president of the Guayas Sports Federation (FEDEGUAYAS), as representative of Ministry of Health. However, she was dismissed from her position in January 2019 by the Sports Secretariat, because the poor state of the sports venues managed by the entity.

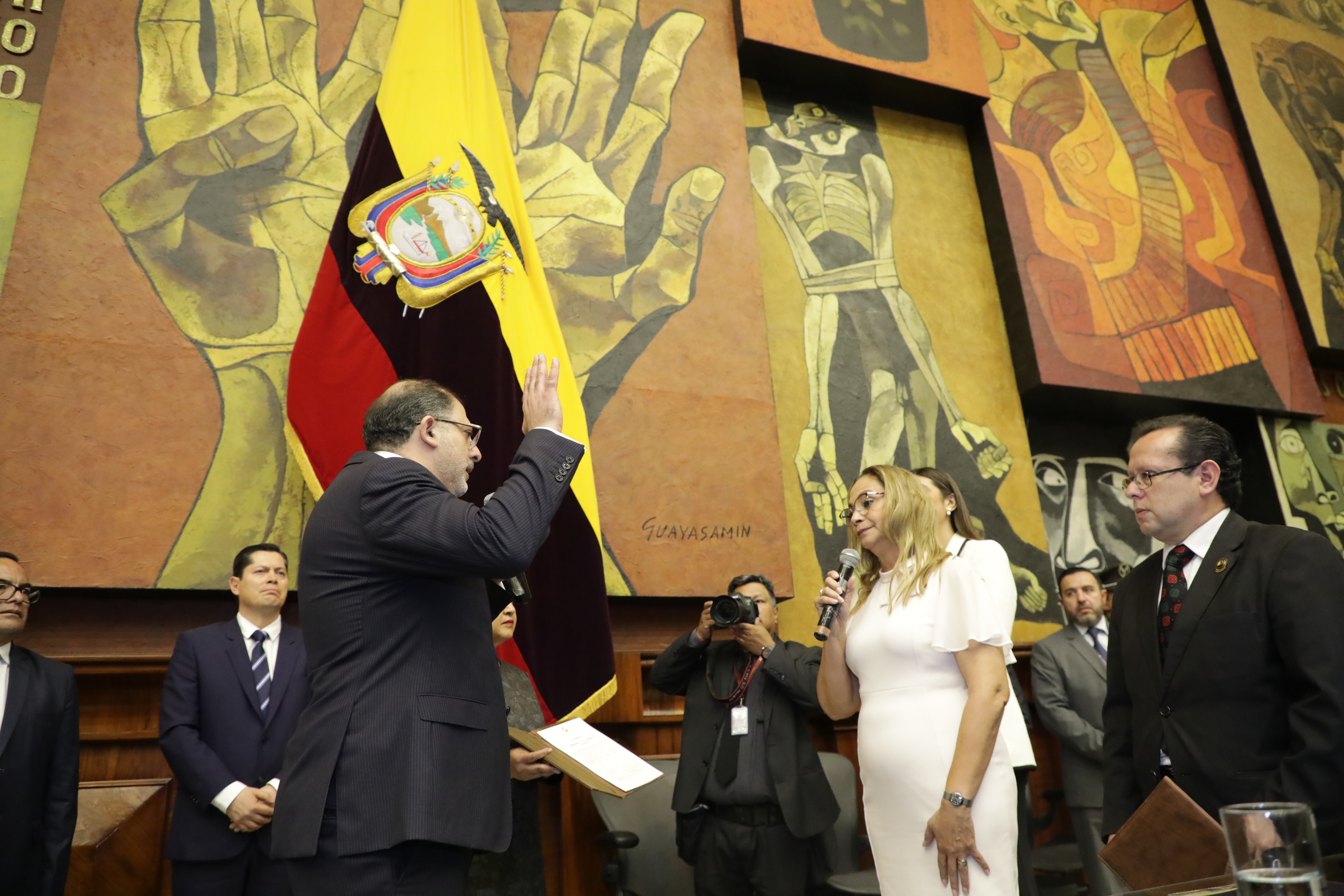
Because Pierina Correa topped the poll of voters she presided, when a new President was appointed in November 2023

Correa was a candidate for the National Assembly in the 2021 legislative elections, where she topped the list of national assemblymen for the Union for Hope.

The President of Ecuador Guillermo Lasso brought in the constitution clause number 148 known as Mutual death in May 2023 when he knew that he was about to be impeached. This required all of the National Assembly members to stand for re-election. Correa and 67 others stood for re-election and she was one of the 43 re-elected later that year. The others included Paola Cabezas, Mabel Méndez, Sofía Sánchez, Gissella Molina and Patricia Mendoza. Correa had the highest number of votes.
