= Consuelo Vega =

Ecuadorian politician

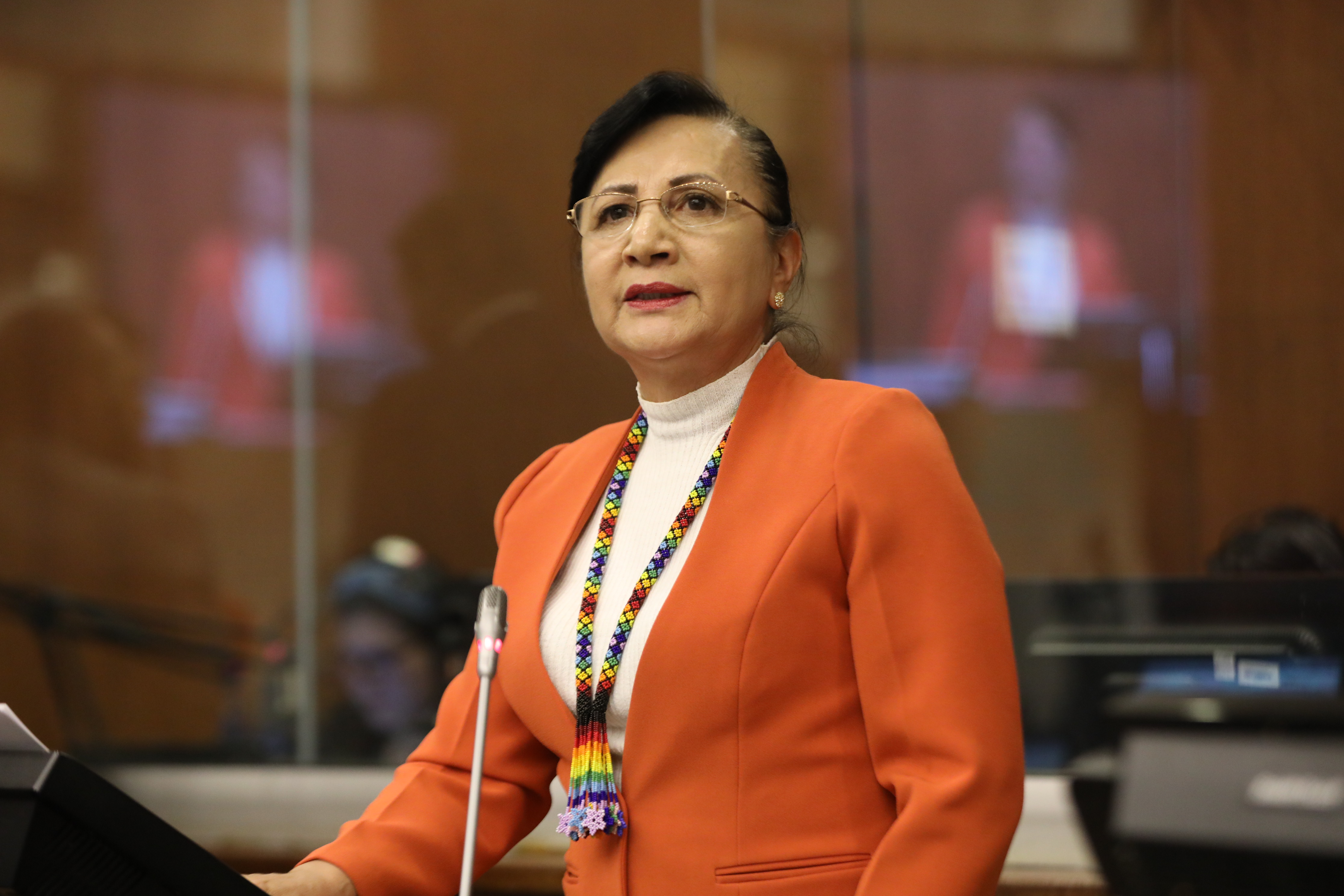
- in May 2022
- Other name: Ligia del Consuelo Vega Olmedo
- Occupation: politician
- Known for: member of the National Assembly of Ecuador
- Political party: Pachakutik Plurinational Unity Movement – New Country

Ligia del Consuelo Vega Olmedo is an Ecuadorian politician for the Pachakutik Plurinational Unity Movement – New Country party. She is a member of the National Assembly of Ecuador.

== Life ==
Vega gained her first degree as Bachelor of Accounting and Auditing from the Technical University of Ambato.

She is a politician for the Pachakutik Plurinational Unity Movement – New Country party. She was elected to the National Assembly of Ecuador. She studied organisation development at the Autonomous Regional University of the Andes until 2010. In 2015 she gained her master's degree at the Autonomous Regional University of Los Andes in Business Management.

She was elected in 2021 to represent the Province of Morona Santiago. Before that she worked for the Association of Provincial Autonomous Governments of the Amazon after being President of an organisation marketing Amazonian products.

She was elected to be the vice-president of the National Assembly's Biodiversity and Natural Resources Commission. Washington Varela Salazar is the president and the other members are Vanessa Álava, Efrén Calapucha, Gissella Molina, Rebeca Veloz, Pedro Zapata, Fredy Rojas Cuenca and Fernanda Mabel Méndez Rojas.

In November 2022, she joined a group of fifteen assembly members who intend to investigate the link between narcotics and politicians in Ecuador. They were requesting information including the names of assembly members who have been stopped from entering the United States. Other members included Fernando Villavicencio, Ricardo Vanegas, Sofía Sánchez, Gisela Molina, Diana Pesántez and Mariano Curicama. They are from different parties but several parties are notably not represented.

In March 2023, Mario Ruiz was elected as the new head of the Pachakutik party block of 20 members in the assembly and they elected Vega as his deputy.
