= Democratic Center (Ecuador) =

Democratic Center Movement Movimiento Centro Democrático
- Abbreviation: MCD
- Leader: Galo Almeida
- Founded: 10 May 2012; 13 years ago
- Legalized: 20 October 2024; 9 months ago
- Headquarters: Guayaquil, Ecuador
- Ideology: Progressivism; Personalism; Populism
- Political position: Center to center-left
- National affiliation: United Front (2014–2016); Union for Hope (2020–2022); Por Un País Sin Miedo (2023)
- National Assembly: 0 / 151
- Prefects: 0 / 23
- Mayors: 17 / 221

Website
- centrodemocratico.org

Democratic Center Movement (Spanish: Movimiento Centro Democrático) is a political party in Ecuador. It is led by Galo Almeida.

== History ==
The party contested the 2021 Ecuadorian general election with the Citizen Revolution Movement in the Union for Hope coalition.

The party supported Jan Topić in the 2023 Ecuadorian general election.

== See also ==
- List of political parties in Ecuador
