= Bella Jimenez =

Ecuadorian politician

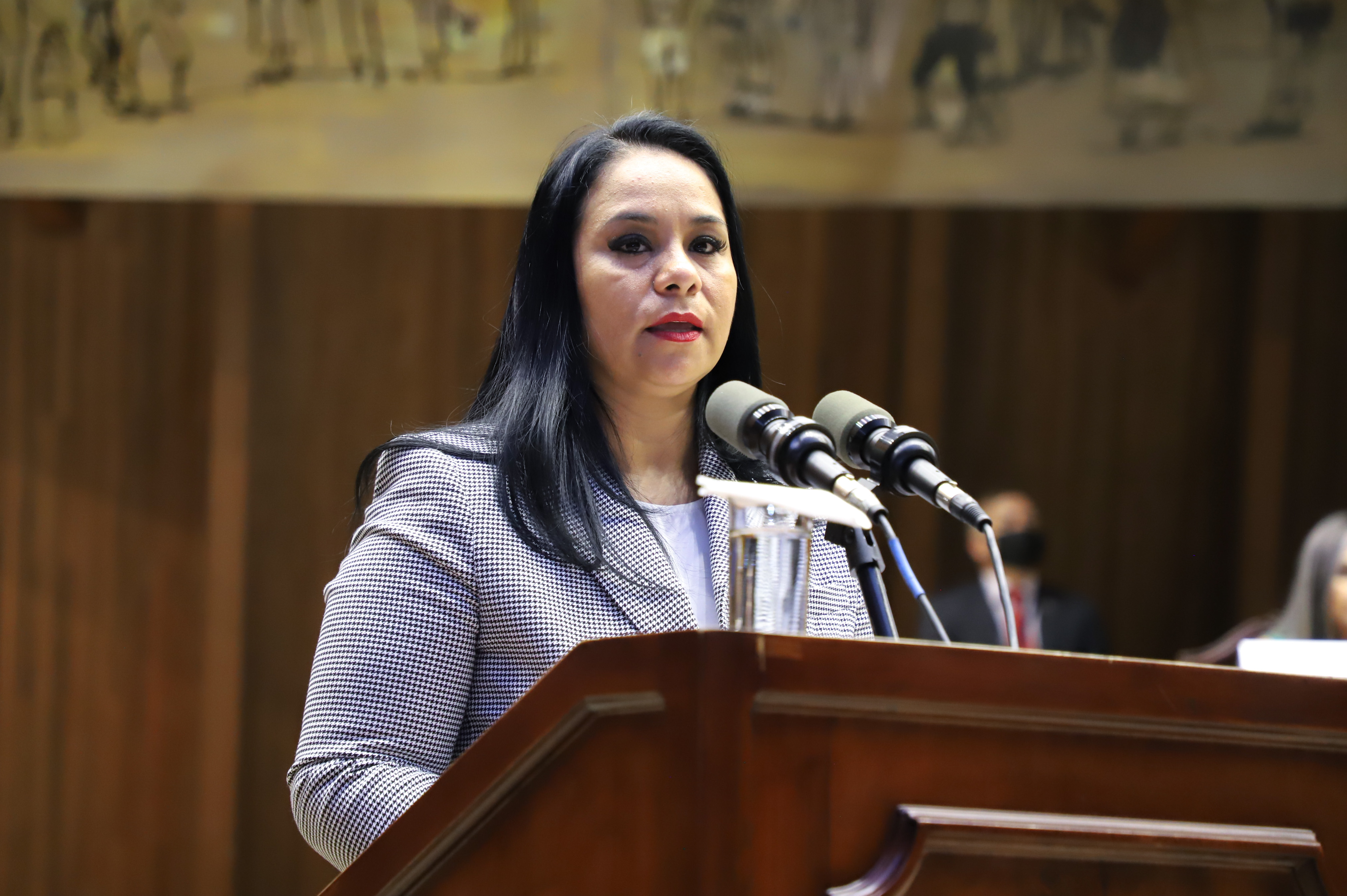
- Born: c.1982
- Other names: Bella Daniela Jiménez Torres
- Occupation: politician
- Known for: expelled from the National Assembly
- Successor: Daniel Onofa Cárdenas

Bella Daniela Jiménez Torres is an Ecuadorian politician. She was elected and expelled from the National Assembly in 2021.

== Life ==
She was born in about 1982 and she is from Guayaquil. She became a local official of the government in Guayas.

She was elected to represent Guayas Province as a candidate for the Democratic Left to the National Assembly in February 2021. In May 2021 she became a second vice-president of the Assembly. She was accused of taking bribes and on social media she blamed her staff for acting in her name without her knowledge. Investigations revealed that she had not made a tax return between 2016 and 2019 and that no record could be found for her university qualifications. In August 2021 she was no longer a member of the Democratic Left party.

She was brought to account to the Ethics Committee by Alejandro Jaramillo and Victoria Desintonio. Two payments featured against her. The first was a $3,000 payment to her son, which Jimenez said was a loan, by Pablo Luna Fuentes. The payment was made to let Pablo Luna Fuentes become a member of Jimenez's team. In the end Fuentes never took the job but that was not because Jimenez did not want him. Scarlett Lindao did become a member of Jimenez's team and she said she had paid $2,500 and that was only part of the $6,000 full price that had been demanded for her to get the job.

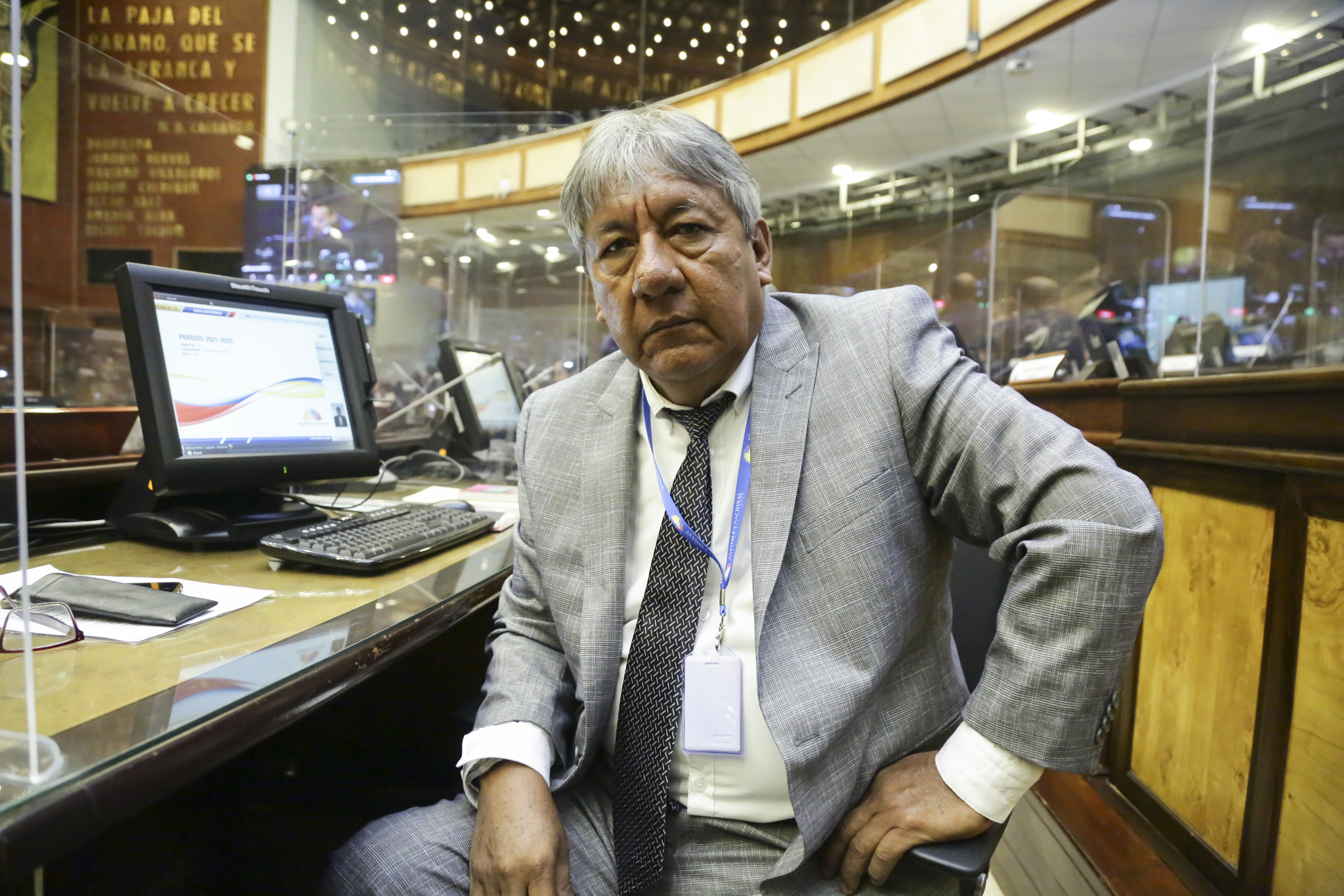
She was succeeded by Daniel Onofa Cárdenas seen here in October 2021

A vote took place at the National Assembly and there were 133 members present. 132 votes went against her and she was the only abstention. She was banned from ever holding a public office and she replaced as a member of the National Assembly by Daniel Onofa Cárdenas who was her alternate.
