= Ana Belén Cordero =

Ecuadorian politician

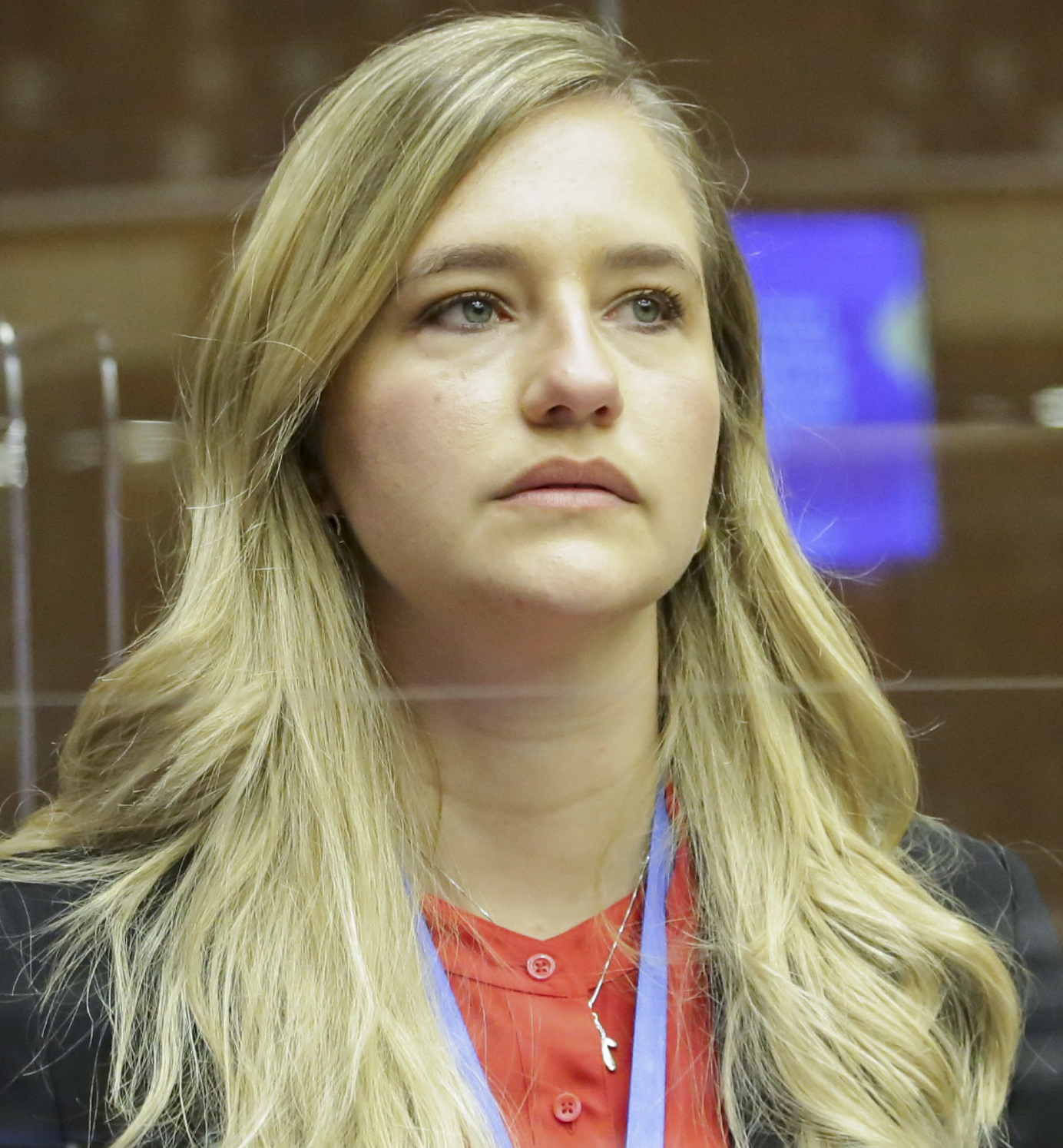
- in 2021
- Other name: Cordero Cuesta Ana Belén
- Education: Universidad de Especialidades Espiritu Santo (UEES) et al
- Occupation: Politician
- Known for: serving on Ecuador's National Assembly
- Political party: Creating Opportunities (CREO)

Ana Belén Cordero Cuesta is an Ecuadorian politician serving in Ecuador's National Assembly from 2021. She is a member of the Creating Opportunities (CREO) party.

== Life ==
She was born in Quito and lived in Guayaquil for around twenty years. She studied at the Nuevo Mundo school, completing her higher studies at the Universidad de Especialidades Espiritu Santo (UEES), continuing at the University of Salamanca in Spain and the Universidad San Francisco de Quito (USFQ). Cordero obtained a master's degree in business law from USFQ and another in political management from the American George Washington University.

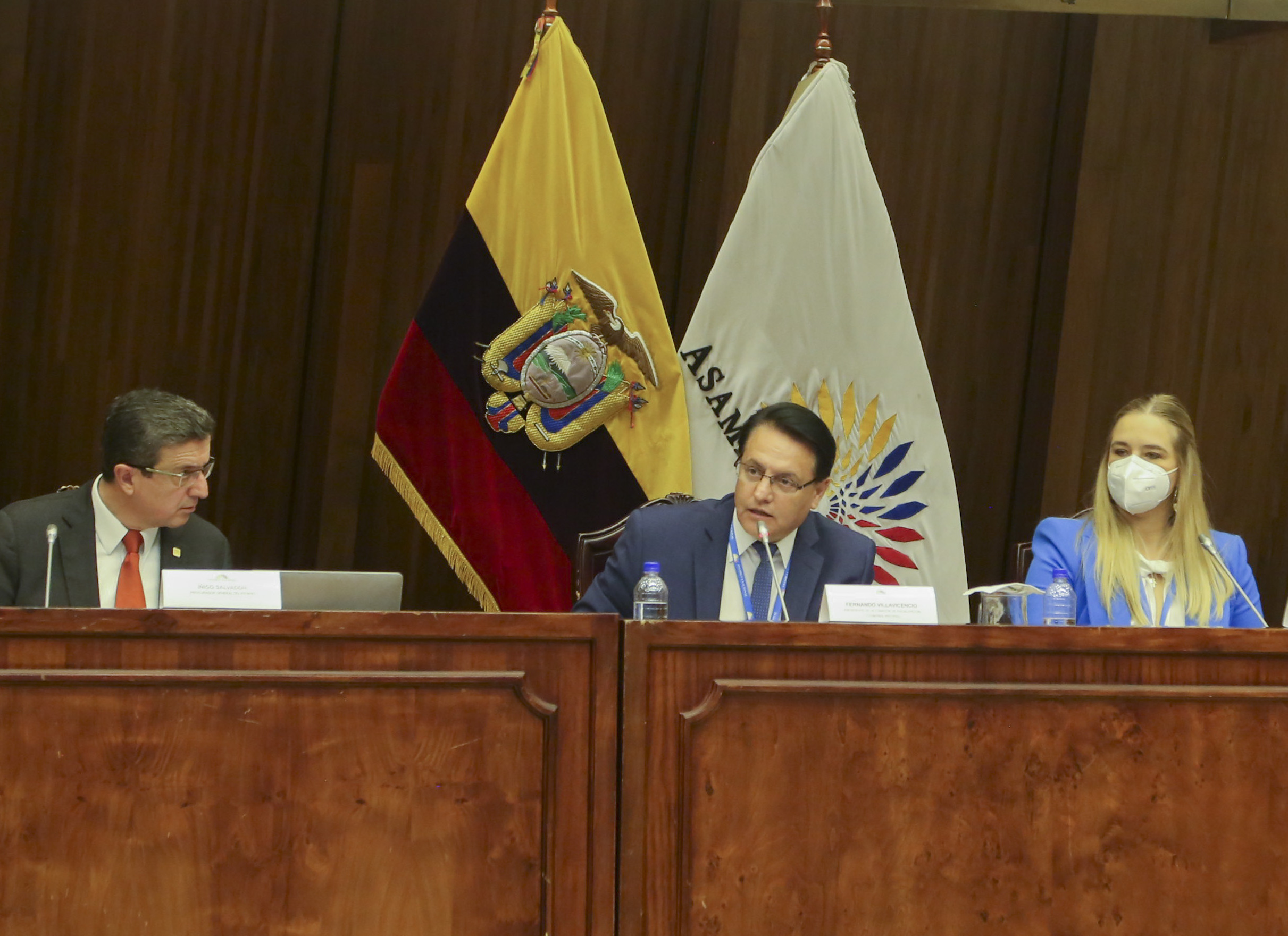
Iñigo Salvador, Fernando Villavicencio and Cordero at the Permanent Commission for Oversight and Political Control in June 2021

Cordero entered the National Assembly on 21 May 2021 as she had stood as the alternate for César Monge who was promoted to be a minister. She is elected to the 4th Assembly on the national list. She is an elected member of the seven member Permanent Commission for Oversight and Political Control.

Cordero was accused of libel after saying the former manager of Yachay University had misspent money in 2022. At that time the university had cost over US$600 million since it was created eight years before. Her words were in relation to a recent report by the Comptroller General made to the Assembly's Oversight Commission. A national judge requested that her immunity be lifted. She is the vice-president of the Oversight Commission and she was questioning millions of dollars of spend made on the university. She considered the accusation to be like "ducks shooting at the shotguns". On the 25 May the judge waived aside the request to waive her immunity from prosecution for libel as unprocedural.

Cordero was involved in creating a report on the activities of Colombian Alex Saab and his links to Nicolás Maduro and money laundering. The report was sent to Colombian President Iván Duque for investigation in January 2022. One source says that the people implicated are not only in Ecuador, but also in Colombia, Venezuela, Panama and the United States.

In July 2022 the National Electoral Council was being impeached. It was alleged that they had failed to investigate irregularities in the February 2021 general election. There were doubts as to whether the National Assembly's Oversight Commission were allowed to impeach the council. On 12 July Cordero proposed to halt the impeachment process and this was unanimously accepted by the commission.

== Private life ==
She met her husband, Fabián Pozo Neira, through the political party and they married in 2016. He is a lawyer who works for the President as a legal secretary. They have a child.
