= Vanessa Freire =

Ecuadorian politician

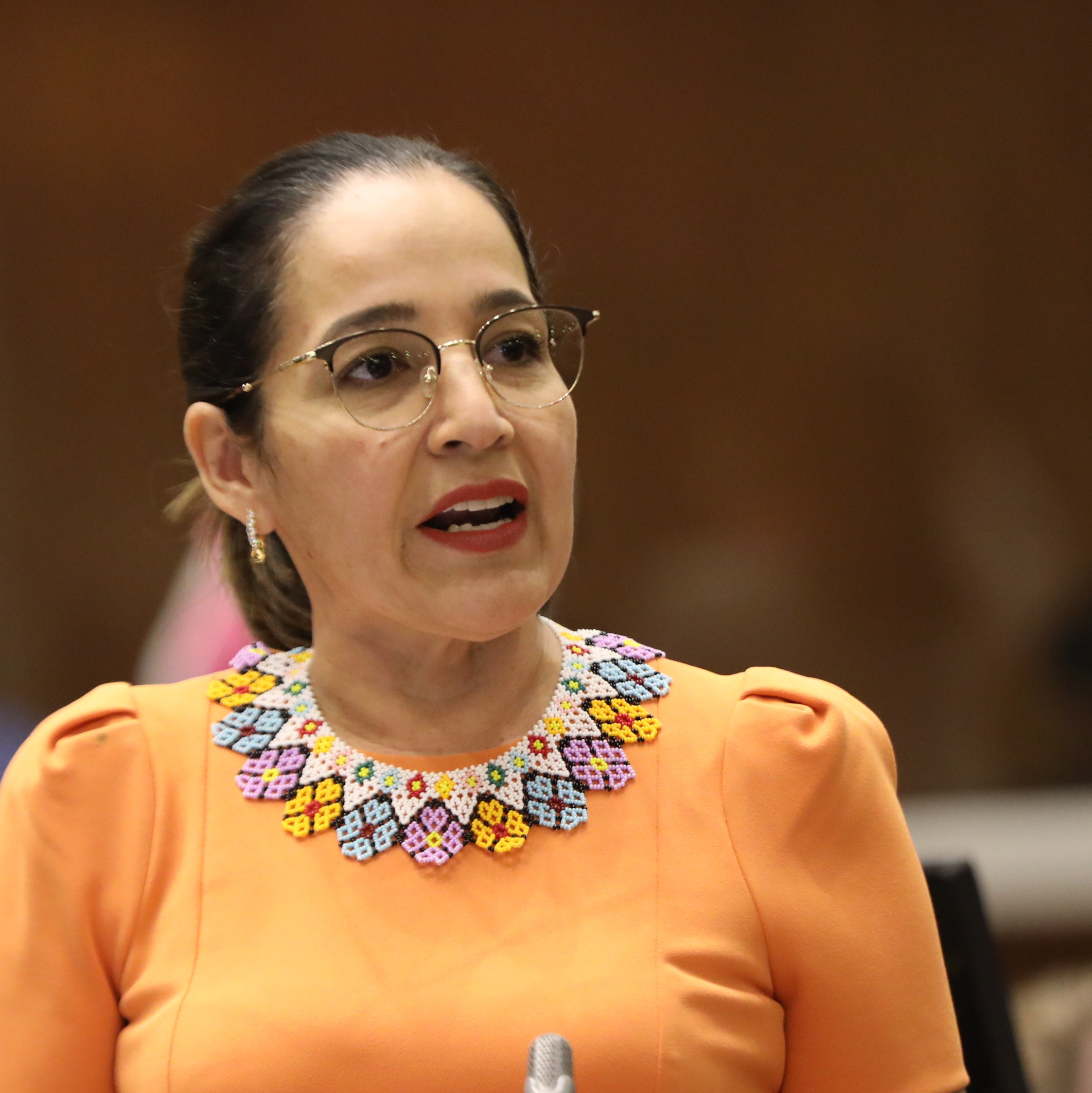
- Born: July 3, 1978 (age 48); Babahoyo
- Education: Metropolitan University of Ecuador
- Known for: Member of the fourth National Assembly of Ecuador
- Political party: Union for Hope until 2021

Freire Vergara Vanessa Lorena (born July 3, 1978) is an Ecuador politician. In 2021 she was a member of Union for Hope. She is a member of the National Assembly

== Life ==
Freire was born in Babahoyo. She studied Business Administration at the Metropolitan University of Ecuador.

In February 2021 she was elected to be a member of the fourth National Assembly of Ecuador.

In July 2021 Freire left the Union for Hope citing organisation differences. In 2022 she was an independent assembly member, she was aligned with the "Bank of the National Agreement" group, but her, and seven others, loyalty was questioned as that group was in decline.

In June 2022 she was representing the ruling party at a hearing established to try a charge against Yeseña Guamaní.

In 2023 she missed an important vote concerning the impeachment of President Laslo. Freire said that she was absent because her husband's father had died. The absent ex-President Correa criticised her and claimed she had sold out for a bunch of lentils.

In December 2024 the corruption charge around Guayaquil Mayor Aquiles Álvarez was in court. The prosecution was blocking bail for several of the accused. It was noted that Freire was not able to be charged because she was standing again for election to parliament.
