= Citizen Revolution Movement =

Political party in Ecuador

Citizen Revolution Movement Movimiento Revolución Ciudadana
- Abbreviation: RC
- Leader: Rafael Correa
- President: Gabriela Rivadeneira
- General Secretary: Evelyn Zambrano
- Founder: Iván Espinel
- Founded: July 2010 (historical); August 2021 (modern)
- Registered: 18 August 2016
- Split from: PAIS Alliance
- Headquarters: Av. 6 de Diciembre N14- 136 y Piedrahita, Quito, Pichincha Province, Ecuador
- Think tank: CEFORMA
- Youth wing: Frente de Jóvenes de la RC
- Membership (2022): ▲200,000
- Ideology: Socialism of the 21st century; Correism; Left-wing populism; Social democracy; Faction: Social conservatism
- Political position: Left-wing
- National affiliation: Union for Hope (2020-2023)
- Regional affiliation: São Paulo Forum
- Colors: Cyan; White; Red
- Slogan: Until Victory Always!
- National Assembly: 65 / 151
- Provincial Prefects: 8 / 23
- Mayors: 50 / 221
- Andean Parliament: 2 / 5

Website
- revolucionciudadana.com.ec

The Citizen Revolution Movement (Spanish: Movimiento Revolución Ciudadana, RC) is a left-wing political movement in Ecuador formed by supporters of former President Rafael Correa who distanced themselves from Correa's former PAIS Alliance party during the presidency of Lenín Moreno. The party takes its name from the term used to refer to the project of building a new society.

== History ==
The party has its origins in early January 2018, as former Ecuadorian President and PAIS leader Rafael Correa left the ruling party over disagreement with the new direction of the party under Lenín Moreno. The party was formed by Correa and a large faction of left-wing PAIS defectors shortly after Correa left PAIS.

The party faced difficulties in obtaining official registration, as Ecuador's electoral authorities refused to register the party and give it access to the signature collection system, as they stated the party was using the symbols and slogans of the PAIS Alliance. The movement's leaders then attempted to register the party under the name "Revolutionary Alfarist Movement", named after former Ecuadorian President Eloy Alfaro, but this was also rejected by Ecuador's electoral authorities. The party's authorities blamed "political direction" by Lenín Moreno's government for these refusals, accusing them of seeking to "prevent the political participation" of the movement and its members.

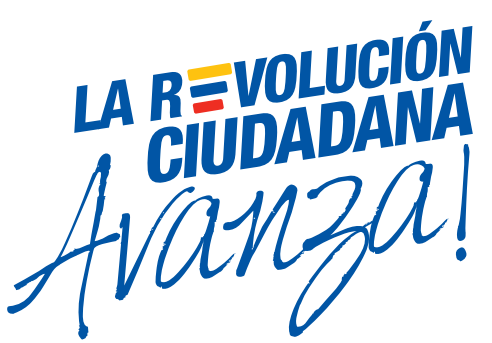
Logo used by Rafael Correa's Citizens' Revolution, the titular movement which inspired the creation of the party.

The 11 April 2021 presidential election run-off vote ended in a win for conservative former banker, Guillermo Lasso, taking 52.4% of the vote compared to 47.6% of the candidate of Citizen Revolution Movement, left-wing economist Andrés Arauz, supported by exiled former president, Rafael Correa.

In June 2021, it was reported that Arauz had resigned the leadership of the Citizen Revolution movement and he was briefly replaced by Raisa Corral who is a legislator for Manabi. She was succeeded by Marcela Aguiñaga as president of the Citizen Revolution Movement later in 2021.

Luisa González was selected as the Citizen Revolution Movement's presidential candidate for the 2023 presidential election, with Andrés Arauz as her running mate. One of her campaign promises was to make former President Rafael Correa a central figure in her administration. After finishing in first place in the first round of voting, she went on to lose to Daniel Noboa, securing 47% of the vote. Gonzalez would go on to lose the 2025 presidential election once again to Noboa, winning 44% of the vote, refusing to concede and alleging fraud without providing evidence.

== Ideas ==
It has been described as representing socialism of the 21st century.

On August the 28th 2021, the Citizen’s Revolution Movement laid out its principles, describing them in these terms:

We define ourselves as a contemporary leftist organization, pluralist, humanist, feminist, and environmentalist. We define ourselves as a progressive, anti-colonial, and anti-capitalist political movement, constituted for political action, contesting access to power and the formulation and implementation of progressive policies that promote good living, through the exercise of politics as a form of service to promote the common good and the self-determination of peoples. We identify with the postulates of the contemporary left, which recognizes forms of property that fulfill their social and environmental function, which tends to progressively intervene in the primary and secondary distribution of wealth to achieve equality and promote economic growth, and which, through the State and the functioning of the market at the service of society, generate post-capitalist societies. Along these lines, we affirm our process of building our own model of Socialism of Good Living. We are a solidarity organization that embraces the causes of fighting neocolonial and patriarchal domination, for social justice, and the defense of the common good and the dignity of Ecuador and the world. We dream of a more humane country and world.

It has also been described as Centre-left.

== Election results ==
=== National Assembly elections ===
Election	Leader	Votes	%	Seats	+/–	Result
2021 (Note: Ran as part of the Union for Hope coalition.)	Rafael Correa	2,584,595	32.21	42 / 137	New	No
2023	Rafael Correa	3,326,110	39.72	42 / 116	Steady	No
2025	Rafael Correa	3,764,096	41.32	66 / 151	▲24	No

=== Presidential elections ===
Election	Candidate	First round		Second round		Result
Election	Candidate	Votes	%	Votes	%	Result
2021 (Note: Ran as part of the Union for Hope coalition.)	Andrés Arauz	3,033,791	32.72	4,236,515	47.64	No
2023	Luisa González	3,315,663	33.61	4,880,525	48.17	No
2025	Luisa González	4,510,860	44.00	4,683,260	44.37	No

== See also ==
- Margarita Arotingo
