= Creating Opportunities =

Political party in Ecuador

Creating Opportunities Creando Oportunidades
- Abbreviation: CREO
- Leader: Guillermo Lasso
- President: Ana Belén Cordero
- Founder: Guillermo Lasso
- Founded: 20 August 2012; 13 years ago
- Preceded by: Popular Democracy
- Headquarters: Av. Quito 2502 y Gomez Rendon, Guayaquil, Ecuador
- Think tank: Free Ecuador Foundation
- Youth wing: Jóvenes CREO
- Membership: 184,299 (2016)
- Ideology: Conservatism; Liberal conservatism; Classical liberalism
- Political position: Centre-right to right-wing
- Regional affiliation: Union of Latin American Parties
- International affiliation: International Democracy Union
- Seats in the National Assembly: 0 / 151
- Prefects: 0 / 23
- Mayors: 20 / 221

Website
- creo.com.ec

Creating Opportunities (Spanish: Creando Oportunidades, CREO, the acronym means lit. 'I believe', and also means lit. 'I create') is a centre-right to right-wing political party in Ecuador. In the 2021 general election, its leader, Guillermo Lasso was elected for president.

== Ideology ==
Generally considered a centre-right to right-wing party, CREO's candidate in the 2021 presidential elections ran on a more centrist platform: his economic development model was mainly market-oriented and favoring entrepreneurship, but also promised state support to micro-enterprises and upgrading of education. With conservatism and economic liberalism.

Lasso promoted an independent judiciary and free speech (the opposition and civil rights organizations consider judicial autonomy and press freedom to be threatened under the administration of President Rafael Correa).

== History ==
In the 2013 presidential election, Lasso was placed second with 22.7% of the votes, having been endorsed also by the Social Christian Party and the Madera de Guerrero movement of Guayaquil's mayor Jaime Nebot. In the simultaneous election for the National Assembly, the party won 11.4% of the votes and 11 out of 137 seats. Hence, it is the major opposition force in parliament.

In the 2014 local elections, CREO obtained 22 mayorships, including those of provincial capitals such as Azogues, Riobamba and Tena, besides the Loja prefecture. In that same year, CREO lead the creation of "Ecuador Compromise" (Compromiso Ecuador) formed by various opposition groups and guilds, including the Migrants Movement led by Luis Felipe Tilleria, and supported by several political figures from across the Ecuadorian political spectrum. The context of its creation was a government-sponsored project for a series of constitutional amendments by the National Assembly, which led to the opposition collective to unsuccessfully ask for a referendum on the matter, with special focus on the amendment that would pave the way for elected incumbents to seek indefinite reelection. In September 2016, CREO was admitted as member of the Union of Latin American Parties, the regional subsidiary of the International Democracy Union.

For the 2017 general elections, Lasso and his movement agreed with the SUMA Party to form the "Alliance for Change" (Alianza por el Cambio) to run on an anti-Correa platform, along with several other smaller groups.

Lasso ran as a candidate again in the 2021 general election. In the first round, Lasso was slightly behind indigenous rights activist Yaku Pérez Guartambel, but eventually garnered enough votes to secure a narrow second-place finish. Lasso would face socialist and Rafael Correa ally Andrés Arauz. He defeated Arauz in the April run-off election, with many news outlets noting the conservative shift among the Ecuadorian electorate. Lasso's victory was also seen as a win for free-market advocates in the country. President-elect Lasso finished second in the 2013 and 2017 presidential elections. On May 24, 2021, Guillermo Lasso was sworn in as the new President of Ecuador, becoming the country's first right-wing leader in 14 years. In 2023, Lasso left presidency.

== Election results ==
=== Presidential elections ===
Year	Candidates		First Round		Place	Second Round		Place
Year	President	Vice President	Votes	%	Place	Votes	%	Place
2013	Guillermo Lasso	Juan Carlos Solines	1,951,102	23%	2nd			
2017	Guillermo Lasso	Andrés Páez	2,652,403	28%	2nd	4,833,389	49%	2nd
2021	Guillermo Lasso	Alfredo Borrero Vega	1,830,172	20%	2nd	4,656,426	52%	1st
