= Amada Ortiz =

Ecuadorian politician

Amada Ortíz
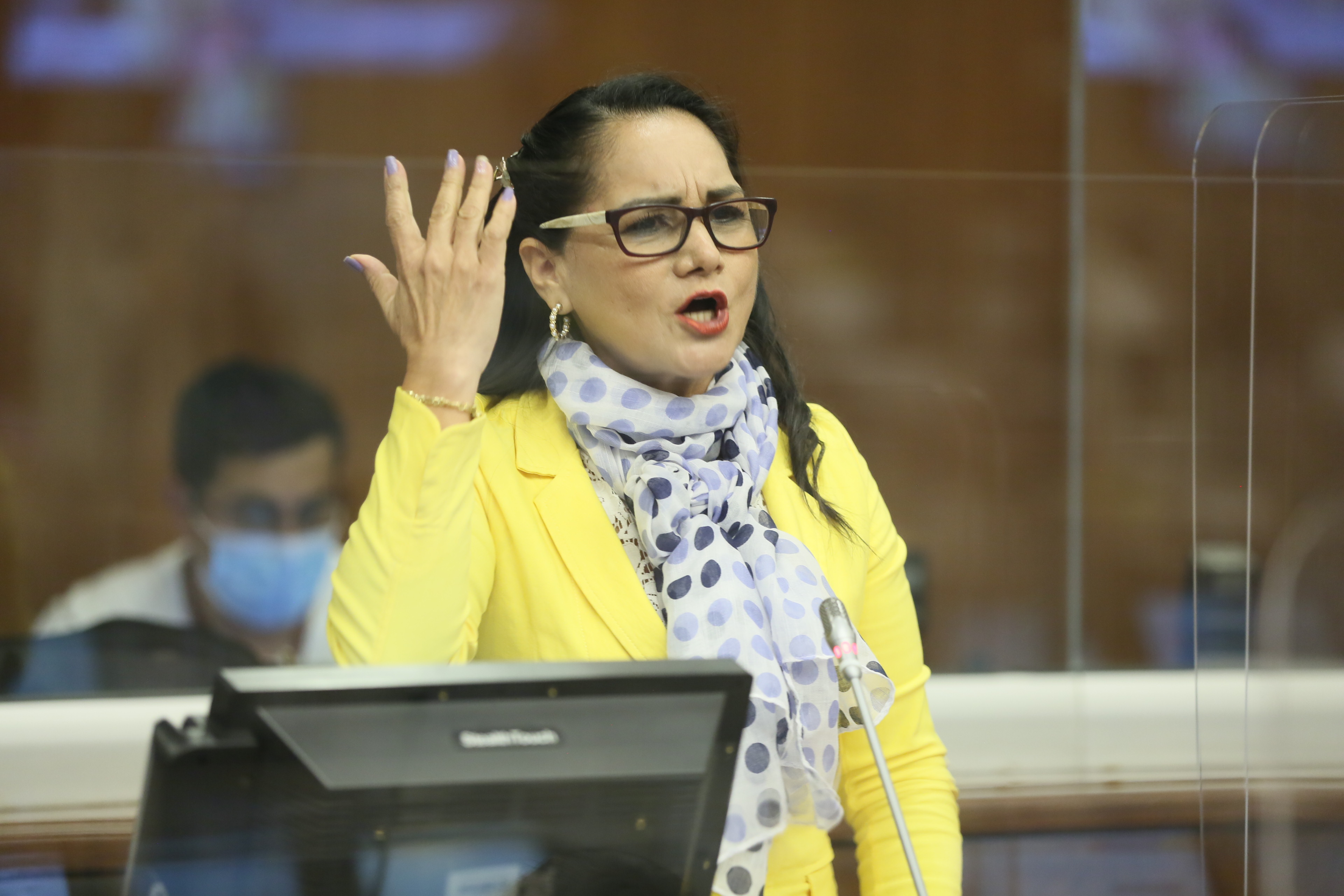
- in March 2022
- Education: Private Technical University of Loja
- Occupation: politician
- Known for: member of the National Assembly of Ecuador
- Political party: Independent (once in the Democratic Left)

Amada María Ortíz is an Ecuadorian politician who is an independent member of the National Assembly of Ecuador representing the Santo Domingo de los Tsáchilas Province. She was a member of the Democratic Left until 2021.

== Life ==
Ortiz studied law at the Private Technical University of Loja and then completed her master's degree at the Universidad Regional Autónoma de los Andes. In 2019 she was a Councilor in the Municipal GAD of Santo Domingo and in 2021 Ortiz was elected to the National Assembly to represent the Democratic Left party and the Province of Santo Domingo de los Tsáchilas. The other assemblymen (sic) from her province are Jose Ricardo Chavez Valencia, Gruber Cesario Zambrano Azua and Rebeca Viviana Veloz Ramirez.

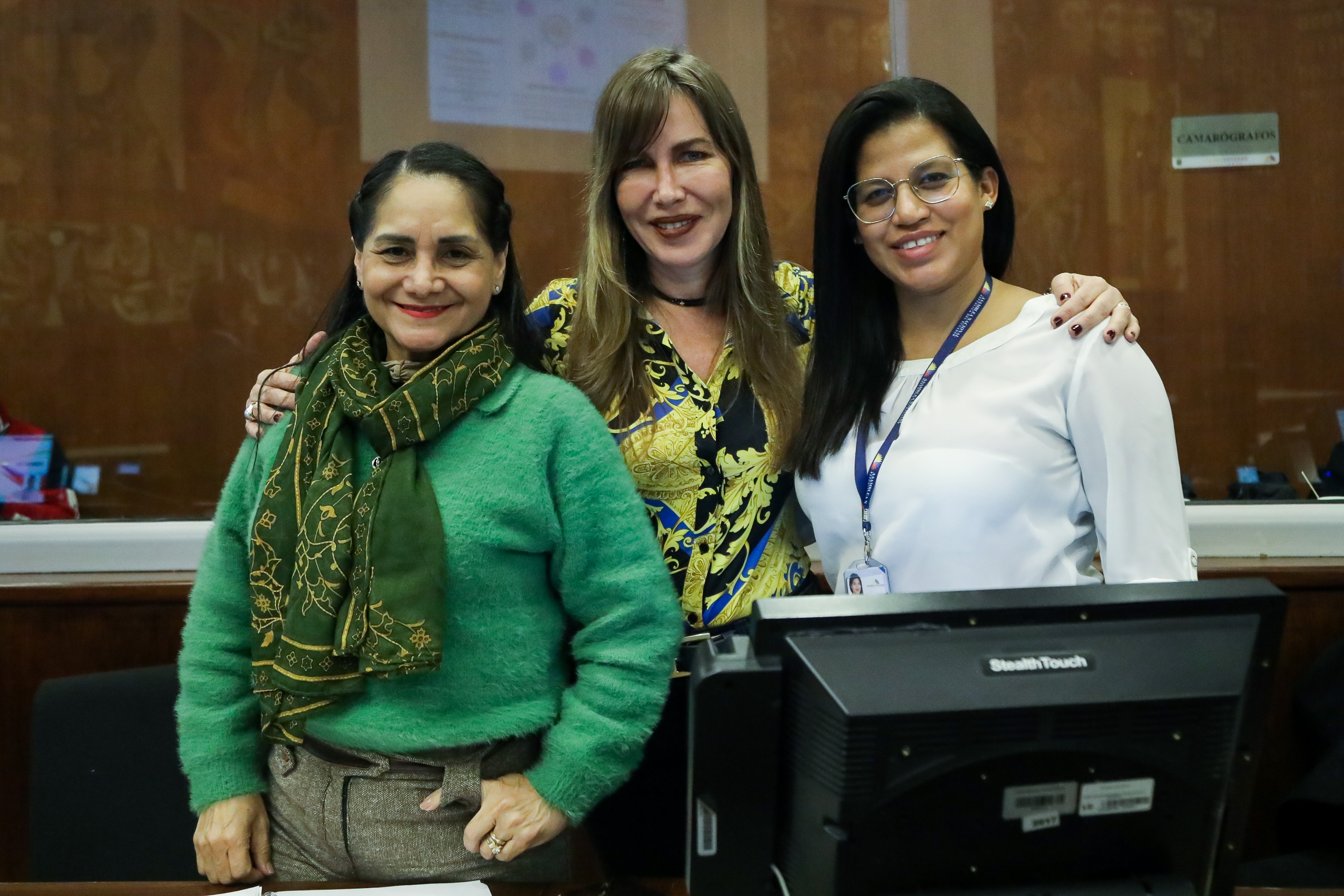
Assembly members, Ortiz, Ana León and Geraldine Weber in 2022

On 18 May 2021 the leader of the Democratic Left disassociated Ortiz from the party. Guillermo Herrera was annoyed that Ortiz had not followed the party's voting and in particular she had supported the Christian Socialist Henry Kronfle as a candidate for the President of the National Assembly. Ortiz became an independent leaving the other fifteen members of her party including Herrara, Yeseña Guamaní, Wilma Andrade and Johanna Moreira.

In September 2022, the murder and presumed femicide of the lawyer María Belén Bernal gained international importance and the case was debated in the assembly and mentioned in the United Nations. Femicide in Ecuador is a problem and a specific offence which some believe is underreported in Ecuador. A five woman team proposed by Pamela Aguirre was appointed to oversee the investigation after the main suspect, a police officer, had fled. The team members were Ana Cecilia Herrera, Mireya Pazmiño, Marjorie Chávez, Yeseña Guamaní and Amada Ortiz who was still an independent member.
