= Marjorie Chávez =

Ecuadorian politician

Marjorie Chavez
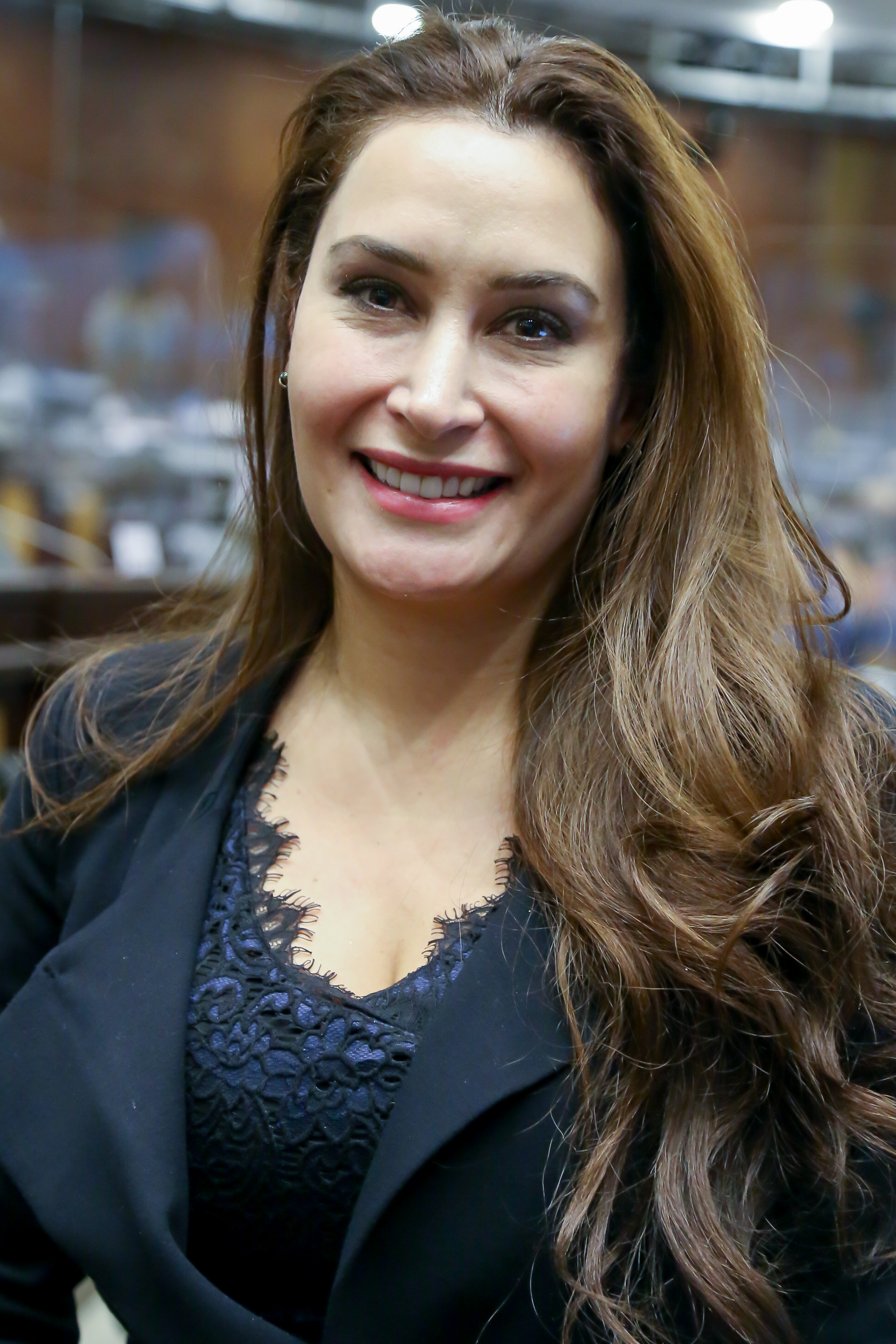
- Other name: Marjorie de Los Angeles Chavez Macias
- Occupation: Politician
- Known for: member of the National Assembly
- Political party: Social Democratic Party

Marjorie de Los Angeles Chavez Macias became an Ecuadorian National Assembly member in 2021. She was re-elected in 2023.

== Life ==
Chávez is a lawyer and she has two university degrees. She has worked as the head of a number of organisations and in 2017 she began work as an advisor in the National Assembly.

In 2019 she had been the National Deputy Director of Information and Institutional Promotion working for the Council of the Judiciary.

She was elected in 2021 to the National Assembly to represent Pichincha Province. She is a member of the Social Christian Party.

In June 2022 when there were moves to impeach Ecuador's President Guillermo Lasso, Chavez said that she and her party would not support this because the country did not need more disruption. 80 of the Assembly members voted for the motion and thirteen of her party voted against it but Chavez was one of those who abstained.

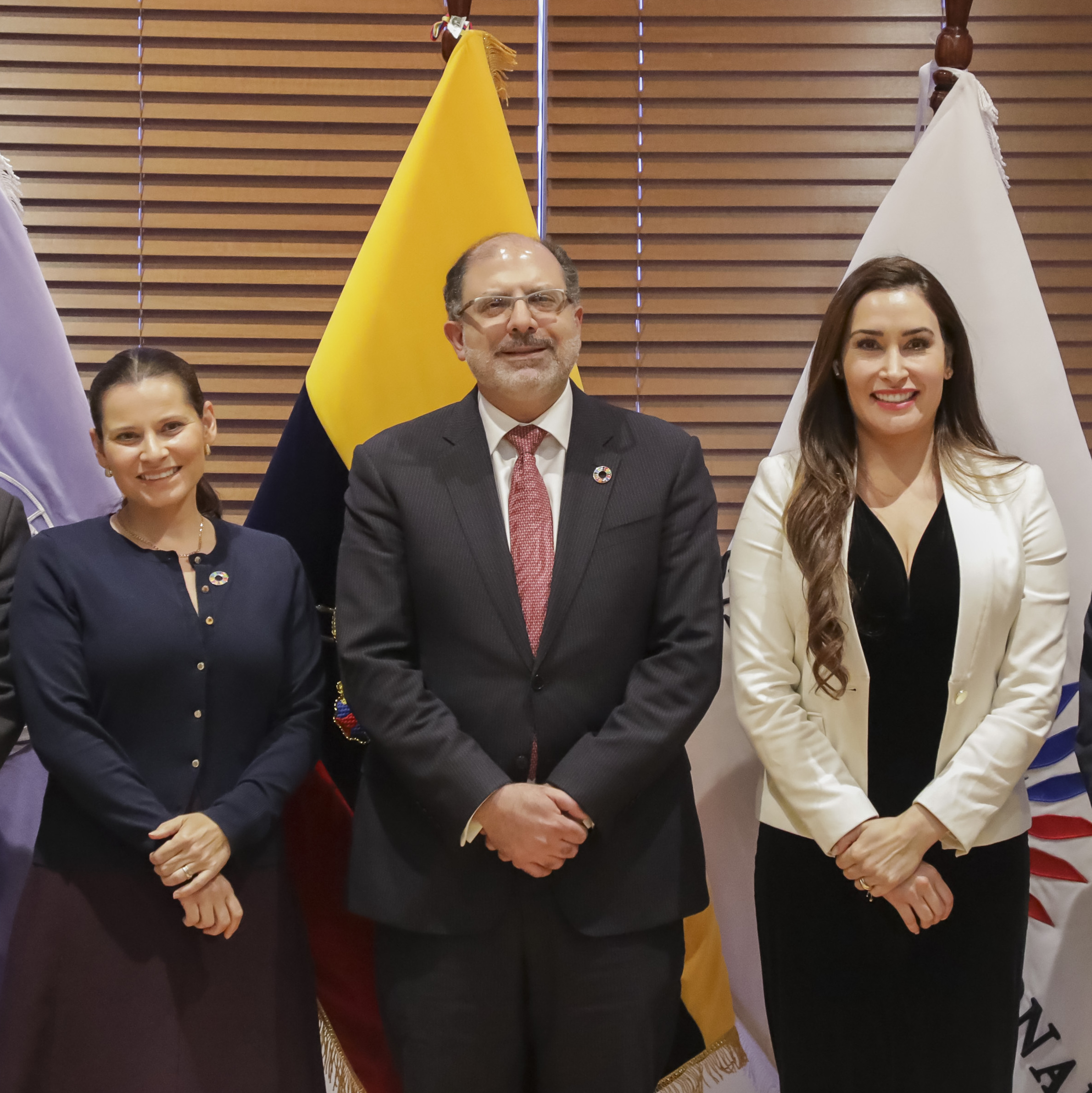
Lena Savelli, Henry Kronfle and Marjorie Chávez on 23 January 2024 during a ceremony to sign a memorandum of understanding.

In September 2022 the murder and presumed femicide of the lawyer María Belén Bernal gained national importance and the case was debated in the assembly. Femicide in Ecuador is a problem and a specific offence which some believe is underreported in Ecuador. A five-woman team proposed by Pamela Aguirre was appointed to oversee the investigation after the main suspect, a police officer, had fled. The team members were Ana Cecilia Herrera, Mireya Pazmiño, Yeseña Guamaní, Amada Ortiz and Chavez.

In 2024 she was one of the hosts when Lena Savelli of the United Nations came to the National Assembly. Savelli and Henry Kronfle signed a memorandum of understanding.
