= Murder of María Belén Bernal =

2022 murder in Ecuador

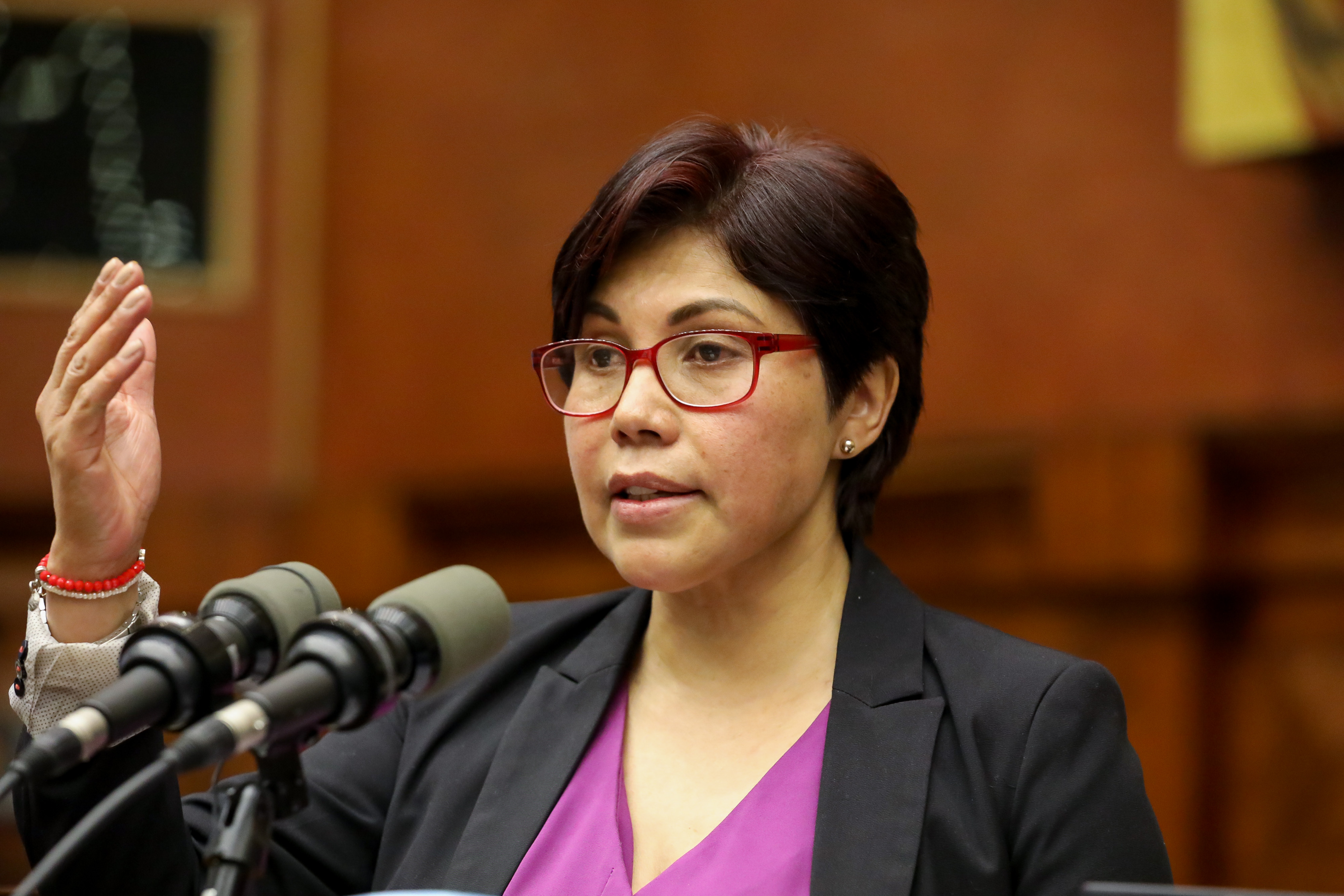
María Belén Bernal's mother (Elizabeth Otavalo Paredes) addressing Ecuador's National Assembly on 27 September 2022

In September 2022 the Murder of María Belén Bernal and presumed femicide gained national importance and the case was debated in Ecuador's National Assembly. Her husband was sentenced to over 34 years in 2023.

== Description ==
The lawyer María Belén Bernal had not been seen since she visited her husband at the Gral. Alberto Enríquez Gallo Police Academy in Quito where she was unusually admitted in the early hours of the morning of 11 September to deliver a burger to her husband who worked there. Her body was found ten days later buried a few miles away on the slopes of Casitahua. The police had interviewed her husband just after she was reported missing but he was released on 13 September. He drove off on a large BMW motorcycle that his wife had bought for him. He then disappeared and there was a reward offered for information about his whereabouts. Femicide in Ecuador is a growing problem and a specific offence which, some believe, is underreported in Ecuador.

Tomb of María Belén Bernal

The public protests about the case led to a number of people losing their jobs including the dismissal of the Minister of the Interior, Patricio Carrillo Rosero by President Guillermo Lasso. Twelve members of the police were suspended and before he left Patrick Carrilo Rosero replaced the head of the Police Academy with a woman, Colonel Irany Ramírez, after the "shame" that the case had brought.

Guillermo Lasso chaired a debate in the National Assembly on 27 September to address the case, during which the victim's mother (Elizabeth Otavalo Paredes) addressed the assembled members. Lasso appealled before the debate for the members to not seek political advantage from the situation. The debate led to a five-woman team being proposed by assembly member Pamela Aguirre. The five were appointed to oversee the investigation after the main suspect, a police officer, had fled. The team members from different political parties were Ana Cecilia Herrera, Mireya Pazmiño, Yeseña Guamaní, Amada Ortiz and Marjorie Chávez.

Hundreds of people turned out to protest her murder and the high rate of femicide in October 2022.

In February 2023 a preliminary femicide trial was made of her husband and a second lieutenant of the police who was on duty on the night she died. A trainee who had been on remand had been released. Bernal's husband was sentenced to over 34 years in May 2023.
