= Esther Cuesta =

Ecuadorian politician

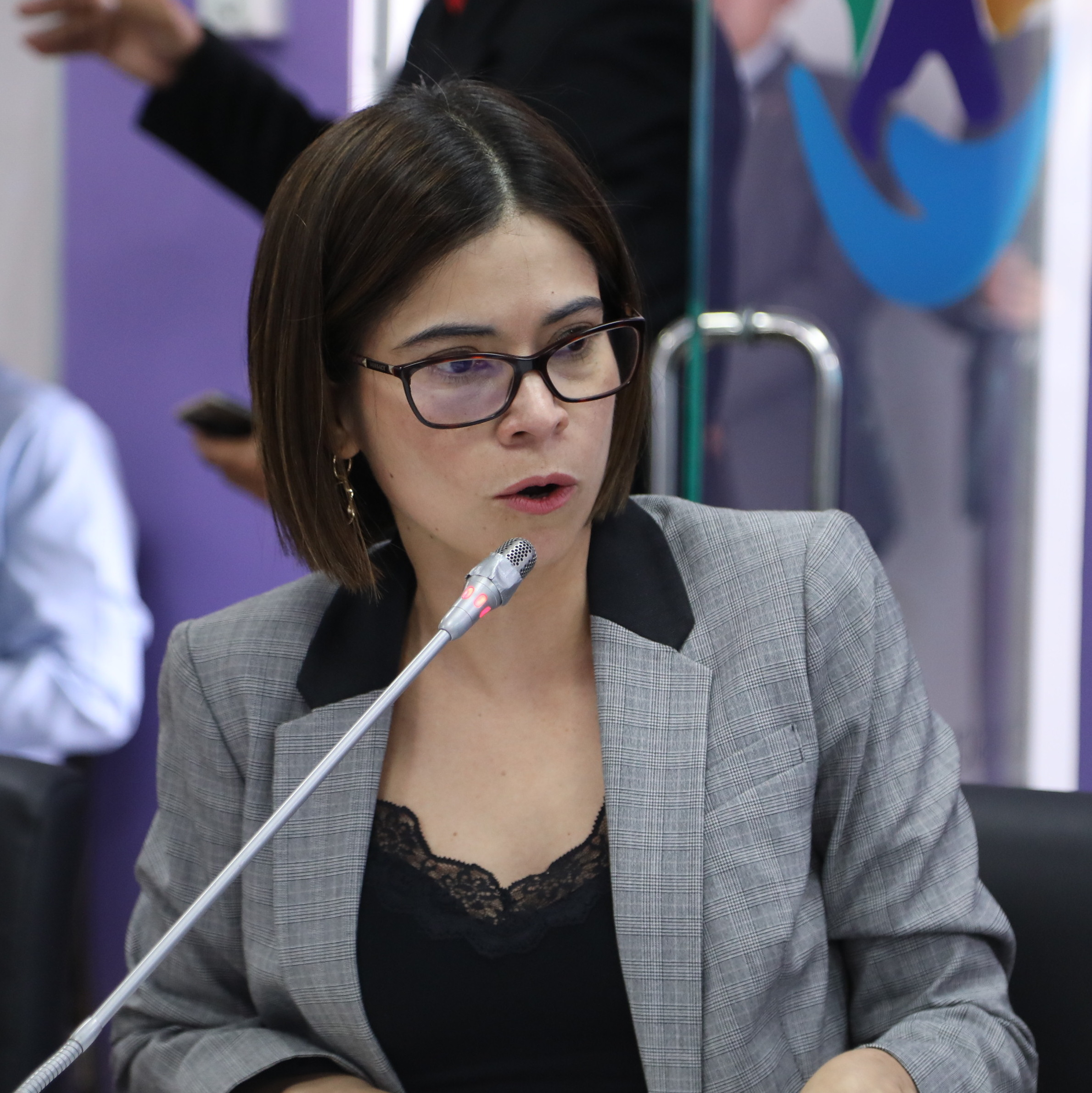
- A re-elected Cuesta at the National Assembly in 2024

Member of the National Assembly
- Incumbent
- Assumed office 14 May 2017

Personal details
- Born: Esther Adelina Cuesta Santana; 23 June 1975 (age 51) Guayaquil, Ecuador
- Party: The Citizens' Revolution
- Education: University of Massachusetts Amherst

Esther Adelina Cuesta Santana (born 23 June 1975) is an Ecuadorian politician and a member of the National Assembly and The Citizens' Revolution. Cuesta was an undocumented immigrant in the United States and she represented the 800,000 Ecuadorian migrants in Europe, Asia, and Oceania. In January 2025 she became the acting President of the National Assembly.

== Life ==
Cuesta was born on 23 June 1975 in Guayaquil, Ecuador, in 1975. When she was 19, she vacationed in Mexico, secretly crossing the border into the United States. She was an undocumented immigrant for "several years". Cuesta earned an undergraduate, masters, and doctoral degrees from the University of Massachusetts Amherst in 2002, 2009, and 2015, respectively. Her interests at the time were not political but in literature, linguistics, economics, anthropology, and sociology. Cuesta's doctoral research involved studying migration to Europe from Ecuador as well as Ecuadorian migrants' cultural production.

In 2009, Cuesta went to Italy to research and, while she was there, was offered the position of Consul eventually becoming Ecuador's Consul General in Genoa. She was in that position until March 2016. She then joined the Ministry of Foreign Affairs as Vice Minister of Human Mobility. She put herself forward as a candidate for the National Assembly and she was elected in February 2017 to represent the 800,000 Ecuadorian migrants in Europe, Asia, and Oceania. She was elected to be the president of the Italian-Ecuadorian Parliamentary Group, the President of the Parliamentary Group to defend Migrants' Rights and President of the Turkish-Ecuadorian Parliamentary Group, and vice president of the Assembly's Committee on Foreign Relations, Sovereignty and Security.

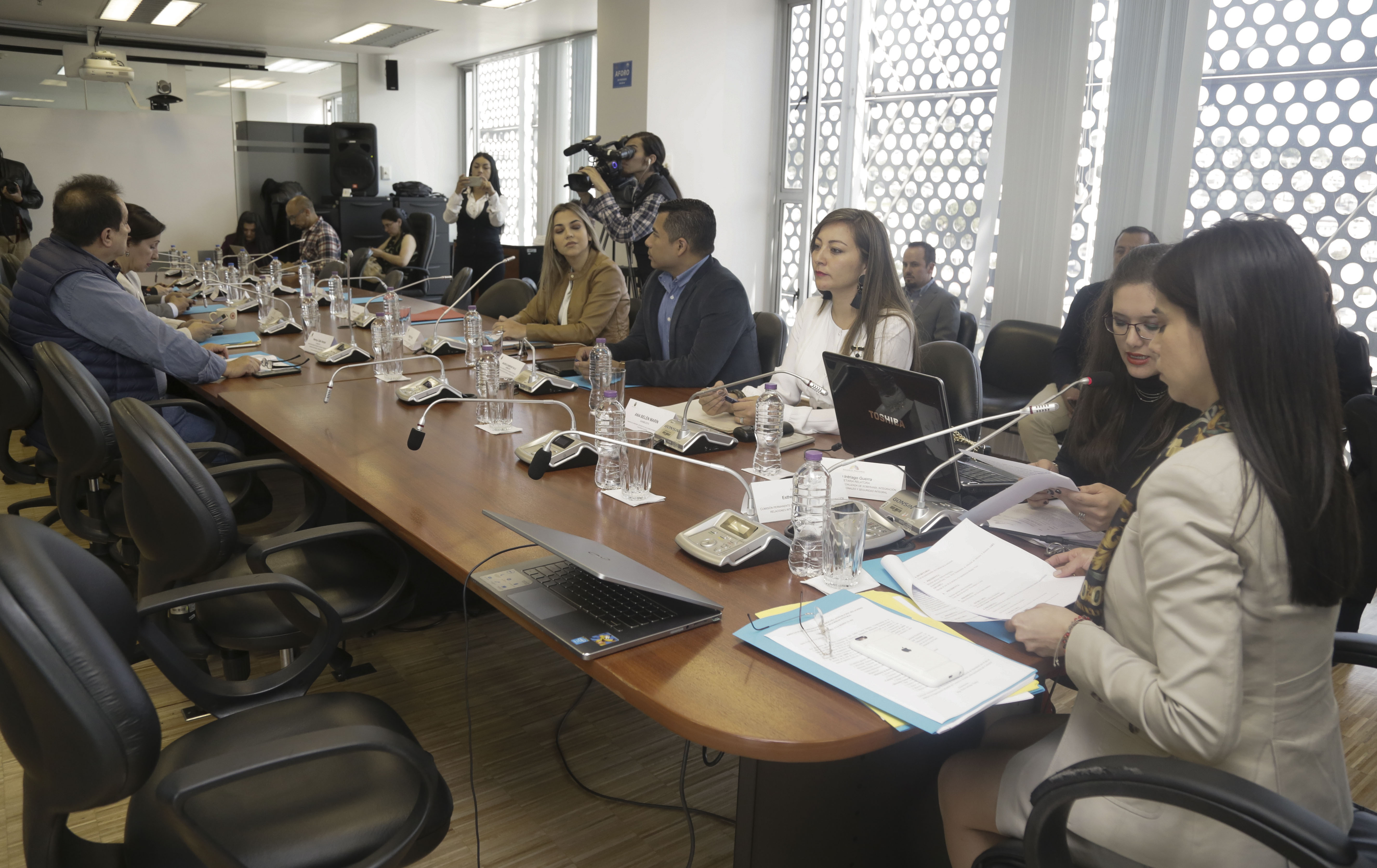
Cuesta (far right, with back to camera) at a meeting of the International Relations Commission in June 2018

Cuesta was President of the Commission for Sovereignty, Integration, International Relations and Integral Security. She was elected by the National Assembly to that position in June 2018 with Ana Belen Marin as her vice-President.

Before the elections in February 2021, Cuesta requested unpaid leave from the assembly so that she could take part in the elections. 42 other members also made the same request including Wilma Andrade, Mónica Alemán, Verónica Arias, Dallyana Passailaigue, Cristina Reyes and Silvia Lorena Vera. During her absence her job would be carried out by her substitute.

In July 2022 the position of vice-president of the assembly was vacant as Yeseña Guamaní had been removed by the Union for Hope (UNES) faction and a replacement was required. There was a political stand-off as the parties could not agree. The Pachakutik party proposed Mireya Pazmiño and Mario Ruiz and the Democratic Left offered Johanna Moreira. UNES offered Marcela Holguín, Sofia Espín and Cuesta.

The President of Ecuador Guillermo Lasso brought in the constitution clause number 148 known as Mutual death in May 2023 when he knew that he was about to be impeached. This required all of the National Assembly members to stand for re-election. Cuesta stood for re-election.

Cuesta was reelected. In April 2024 she caused controversy when she published a video in support of Jorge Glas who was a former colleague who was then avoiding arrest inside the Mexican embassy.

In January 2025 she took over from Viviana Veloz as the temporary President of the National Assembly. Veloz was standing for re-election so Cuesta will hold the position of President until 9 February 2025. The actions she took during that time caused charges to be made against her.
