= Rocio Guanoluisa =

Ecuadorian politician

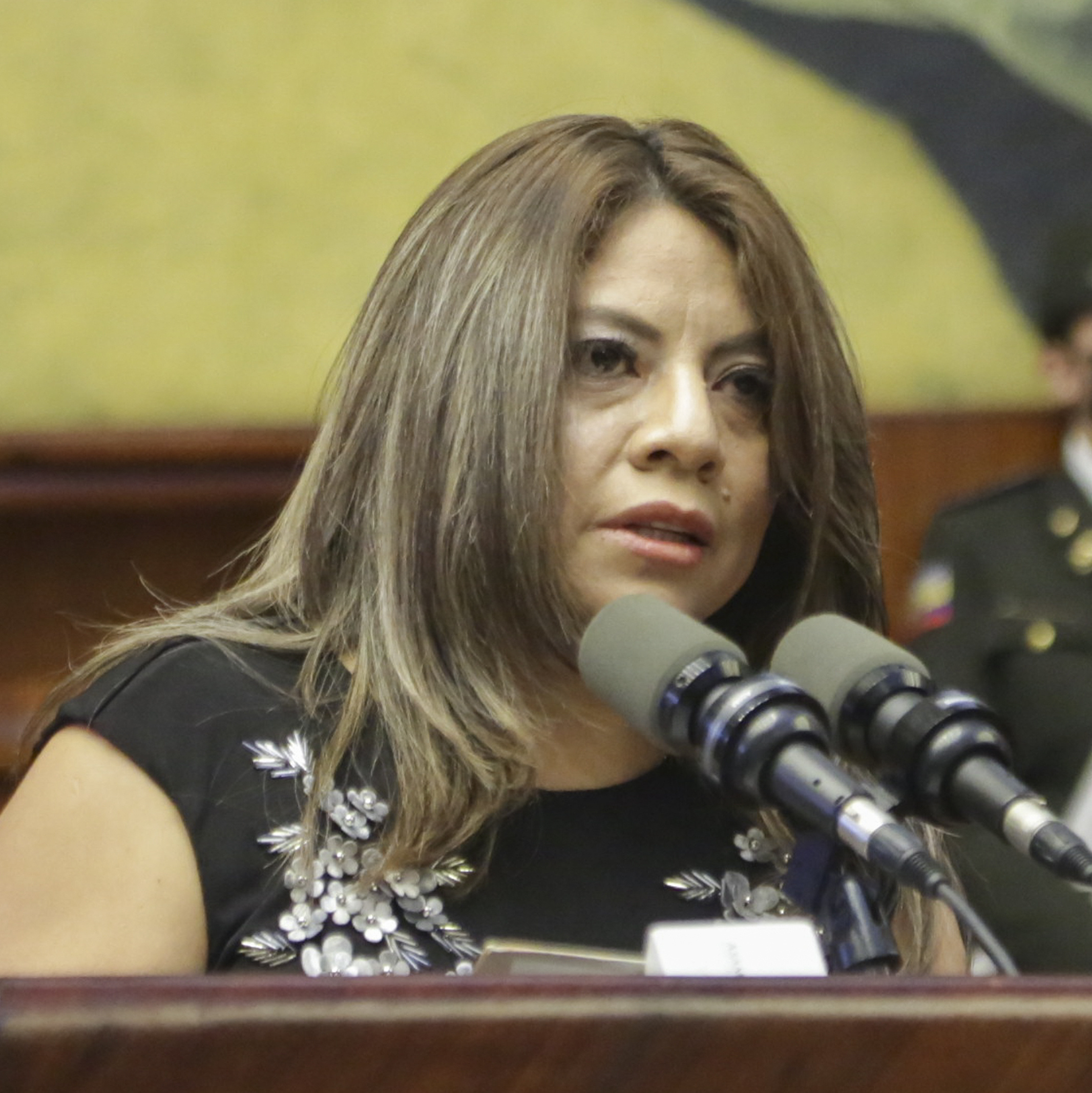
- Vice-president of the Education committee in 2021
- Born: Amparo Rocio Guanoluisa Farinango
- Occupation: politician
- Known for: National Assembly member
- Term: 2021-2023
- Political party: Democratic Left

Amparo Rocio Guanoluisa Farinango is an Ecuadorian politician known as Rocio Guanoluisa. She was elected to Ecuador's National Assembly in 2021 and served until 2023.

== Life ==
She was elected to be a Members of the fourth legislative period of the National Assembly of Ecuador in 2021. She was elected by the assembly to be the vice-president of their Education committee.

In 2022 there were five party members who were accused by Yeseña Guamaní of not voting with the Democratic Left party. The five members were Johanna Moreira, Alejandro Jaramillo, Javier Santos, Lucía Placencia and Guanoluisa. This raised an issue as the Assembly's Council of Legislative Administration had difficulty in obtaining a quorum. The Democratic Lefts bench weakened when she, Lucía Placencia and Xavier Santos were expelled in May 2022 “due to their public and notorious actions that go against our social-democratic political line.”

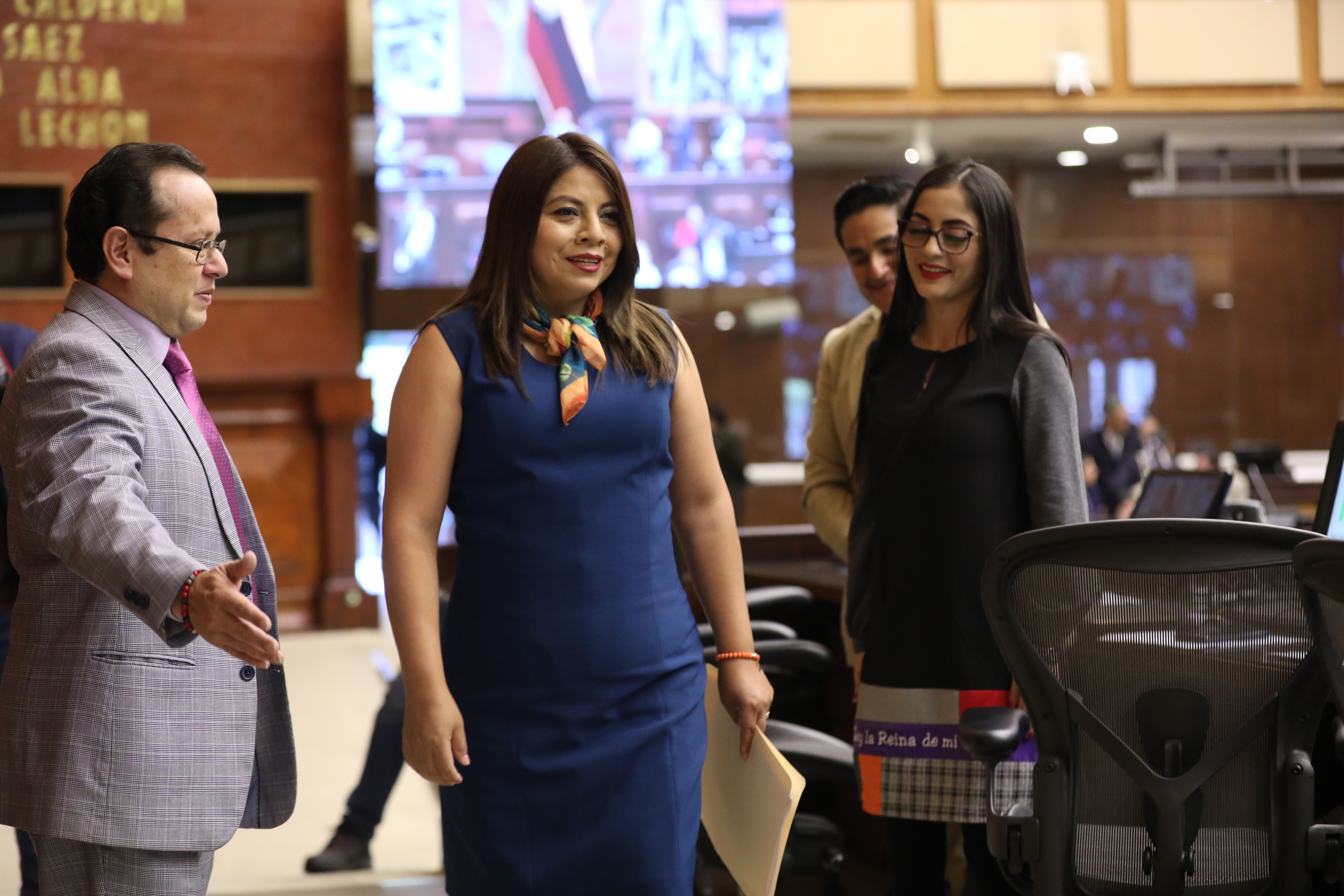
Guanoluisa returning in 2024 to present to the National Assembly

In June 2022 her earlier accuser, Yeseña Guamaní, was called to defend a charge of breach of duties by Jhajaira Urresta. A committee was formed consisting of Patricia Mendoza, Mireya Pazmiño, María José Plaza, Elina Narváez and Guanoluisa to consider the complaint. Guamani did not recognise the authority of the committee and singled out Rocío Guanoluisa because she was no longer a supporter of the Democratic Left party.

The President of Ecuador Guillermo Lasso brought in the constitution clause number 148 known as Mutual death in May 2023 when he knew that he was about to be impeached. This required all of the National Assembly members including Guanoluisa to stand for re-election.

In January 2024 Guanoluisa returned to the National Assembly to contribute to the debate over legislation that would creation a University of Citizen Security and Police Sciences. The bill had originally been proposed, when Tannya Varela led the police, by María Paula Romo who was the minister. After Guanoluisa's presentation the assembly approved the bill and the creation of a Police University.
