= Alexandra Arce =

Ecuadorian politician and engineer

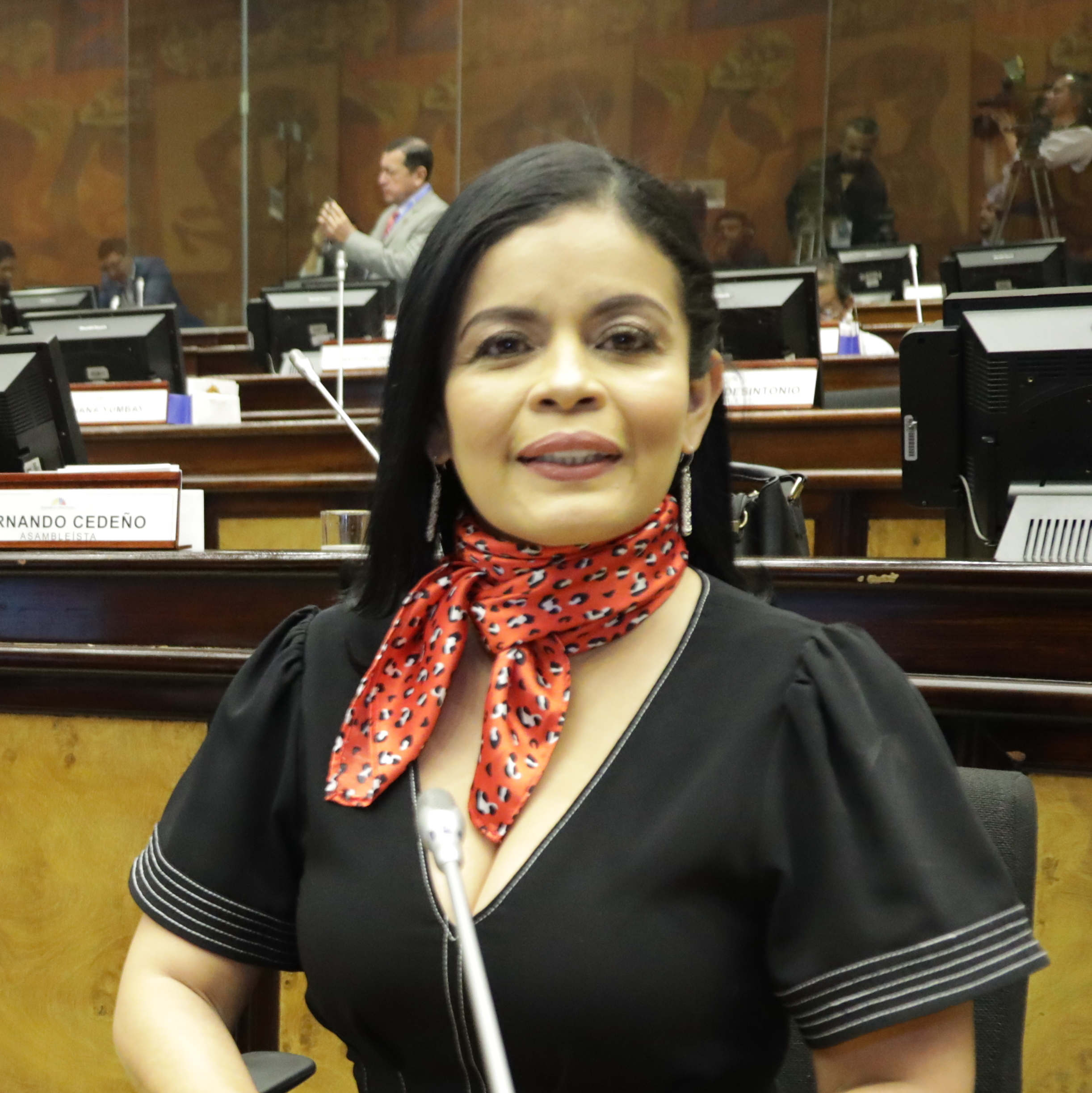
- Alexandra Arce in 2023

Mayor of Durán, Ecuador
- In office 14 May 2014 – 14 May 2019
- Preceded by: Dalton Narváez
- Succeeded by: Dalton Narváez

Ecuadorian National Assembly
- In office 2013 – November 2013

City Council of Durán
- In office 2009–2012

Personal details
- Born: Alexandra Manuela Arce Plúas; 31 July 1977 (age 49) Guayaquil
- Party: PAIS Alliance
- Education: Laica Vicente Rocafuerte University
- Occupation: Politician

Alexandra Manuela Arce Plúas (born 31 July 1977) is an Ecuadorian politician and engineer. She was elected to the National Assembly in 2013, she became a Mayor and she was re-elected in 2023.

== Biography ==
Alexandra Arce was born in Guayaquil, Ecuador, on 31 July 1977. She studied at the Laica Vicente Rocafuerte University, graduating with a degree in commercial engineering.

In the 2009 provincial elections, Arce was elected to the City Council of Durán as a member of the PAIS Alliance. During her time on the council, Arce was set against the policies of Mayor Dalton Narváez, of the Social Christian Party. In May 2010, Arce filed a complaint with a prosecutor against the mayor and his mother, former Mayor Mariana Mendieta, over allegations of a physical attack and corruption in Narváez's government.

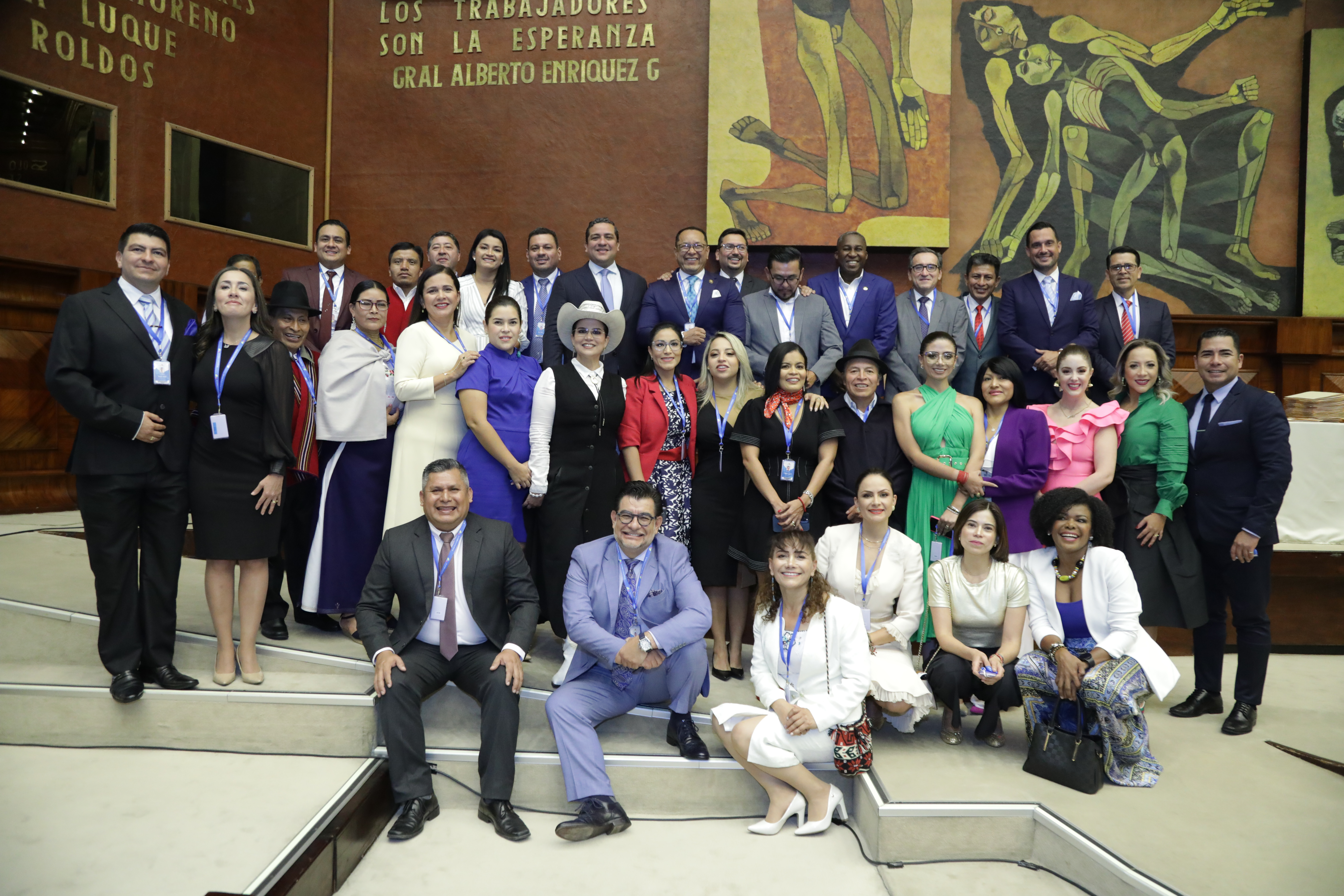
2023 National Assembly - Arce is 9th from left in the middle row

In the 2013 legislative elections, Arce was elected to the Ecuadorian National Assembly for Guayas Province and representing the PAIS Alliance. She resigned from her seat in November of that same year to stand for election in the 2014 elections for the mayoralty of Durán, and defeated Dalton Narváez, who sought reelection.

In 2023 she returned to the National Assembly after the mass resignation, that year, created by the out-going President Lasso.
