= Lucía Placencia =

Ecuadorian politician

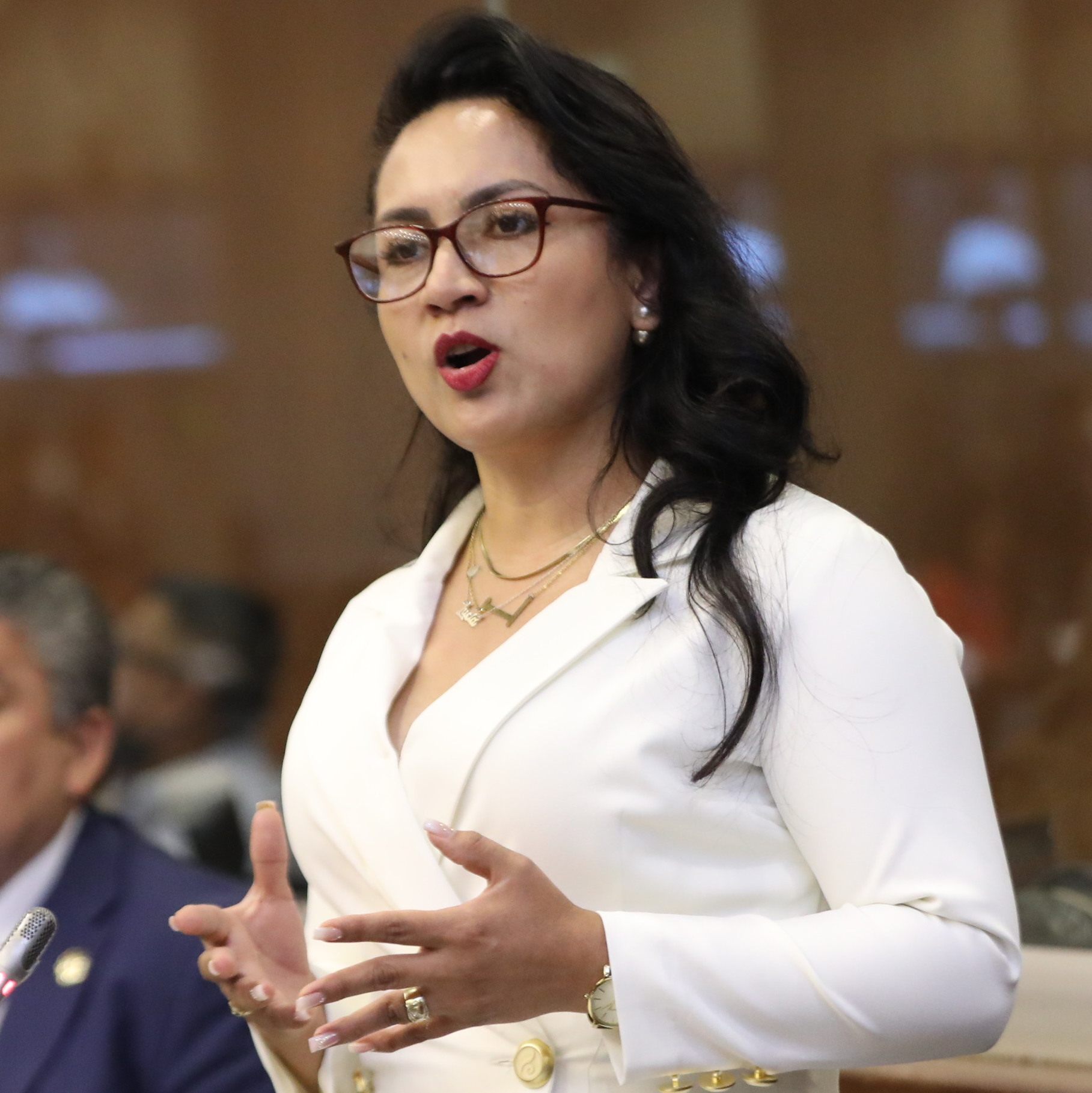
- at the National Assembly
- Education: Universidad Técnica Particular de Loja
- Occupation: politician
- Known for: National Assembly member
- Political party: Democratic Left party

Lucía Shadira Placencia Tapia is a politician at Ecuador's National Assembly representing the Province of Loja. She was a member of the Democratic Left party, but she was expelled after a dispute.

== Life ==
Placencia was born in about 1978. Her mother brought her up, after her father died when she was young. She helped her mother with the chickens and growing tomatoes. She studied tourism. After she married they ran a restaurant.

She was studying for a law degree from the Universidad Técnica Particular de Loja when she went into the election for the National Assembly as the prime candidate for the Democratic Left party in Loja.

She represents the Province of Loja at Ecuador's National Assembly having been elected on 7 February 2021. There are 137 members in the assembly. The other three from Loja are Manuel Medina Quizhpe, Johanna Ortiz Villavicencio and Byron Maldonado Ontaneda and their first day on the assembly was on 7 May 2021.

In 2021 she organised a craft fair which was mainly led by women entrepreneurs. Thirty stallholders sold their own products at the Plaza de la Cultura in Loja where they were selling to people from that province. In the same year she was supporting a law that would bring in a system for overseeing the way that food was distributed. She noted that the latest figures for malnutrition amongst children dated from 2018. It was hoped that more information may lead to the reduction of malnutrition.

In 2022 there were five Democratic party members who were not voting with the party. The five members were Johanna Moreira, Alejandro Jaramillo, Rocío Guanoluisa, Javier Santos and Placencia. This raised difficulty with the Assembly's Council of Legislative Administration who had difficulty in obtaining a quorum. Alejandro Jaramillo and then Johanna Moreira were expelled from the party.

In 2022 she was the vice-president of the National Assembly's Commission for Food Sovereignty and Development of the Agricultural and Fisheries Sector where Mariano Curicama was the President.

== Private life ==
Placencia is married and has three children.
