= Marcela Aguiñaga =

Ecuadorian politician (born 1973)

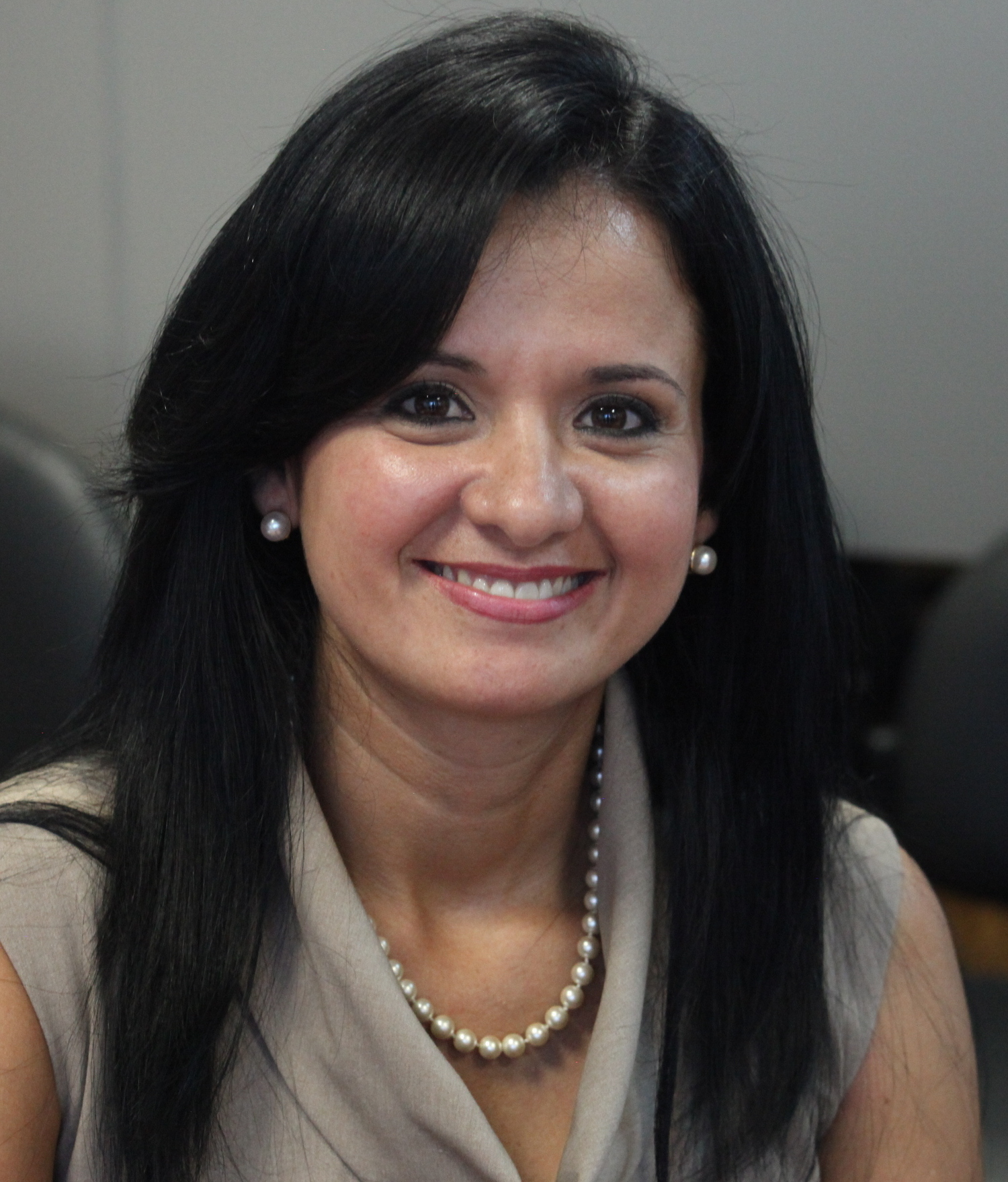

Second Vice President of the National Assembly
- In office 14 May 2013 – 14 May 2017
- President: Gabriela Rivadeneira
- Preceded by: Rocío Valarezo

Member of the National Assembly for the National Constituency
- Incumbent
- Assumed office 14 May 2013

Provincial Prefect of Guayas
- Incumbent
- Assumed office 14 May 2023
- Preceded by: Susana González

Minister of the Environment
- In office 17 November 2007 – 9 November 2012
- President: Rafael Correa
- Preceded by: Anita Albán
- Succeeded by: Lorena Tapia

Personal details
- Born: 25 April 1973 (age 53) Guayaquil, Ecuador
- Party: Citizen Revolution Movement (before: PAIS Alliance )
- Education: Universidad Católica de Santiago de Guayaquil
- Website: http://www.marcelaguinaga.com/ marcelaguinaga.com]

Marcela Paola Aguiñaga Vallejo (born 25 April 1973) is an Ecuadorian politician. She most recently served as the Second Vice President of the National Assembly of Ecuador. Previously she was the Ecuadorian Minister of the Environment.

== Education ==
She attended the Universidad Católica de Santiago de Guayaquil, where she earned a degree in law. She did her post-graduate studies in environmental law and sustainable development at the University of Guayaquil.

== Professional life ==
She started her career in 1999, as a legal assistant and associate attorney at Estudio Jurídico Aguiñaga & Compañía. In 2000, she continued her career as a legal assistant at the Galápagos National Park.

== Political career ==
In 2007, Aguiñaga started working for the Ministry of Environment. From March till September 2007, she was Subsecretary of Fishing Resources. Subsequently she was Subsecretary of Aquaculture from September till November 2007. She was named Minister of the Environment by President Rafael Correa on November 17, 2007, replacing lawyer Anita Albán. She ended her term as Minister of the Environment in November 2012 to run for a seat in the National Assembly as a PAIS Alliance candidate in the February 2013 elections. She was elected a member for the National Constituency and named Second Vice President of the Council of Legislative Administration (an Assembly body) in May 2013.

In 2019, Aguiñaga revealed that she was one of three members of the National Assembly investigated by the Attorney General for allegedly inciting violence during the General Strike in October 2019. The other two were Marcela Holguín and Daniel Romero.

Since 2021 she has been president of Citizen Revolution Movement, a new pro-Correa left-wing party.

== Personal life ==
Aguiñaga has said that working for the Galápagos National Park has made the environment a priority in her life.
