= María José Plaza =

Ecuadorian politician

Maria Jose Plaza
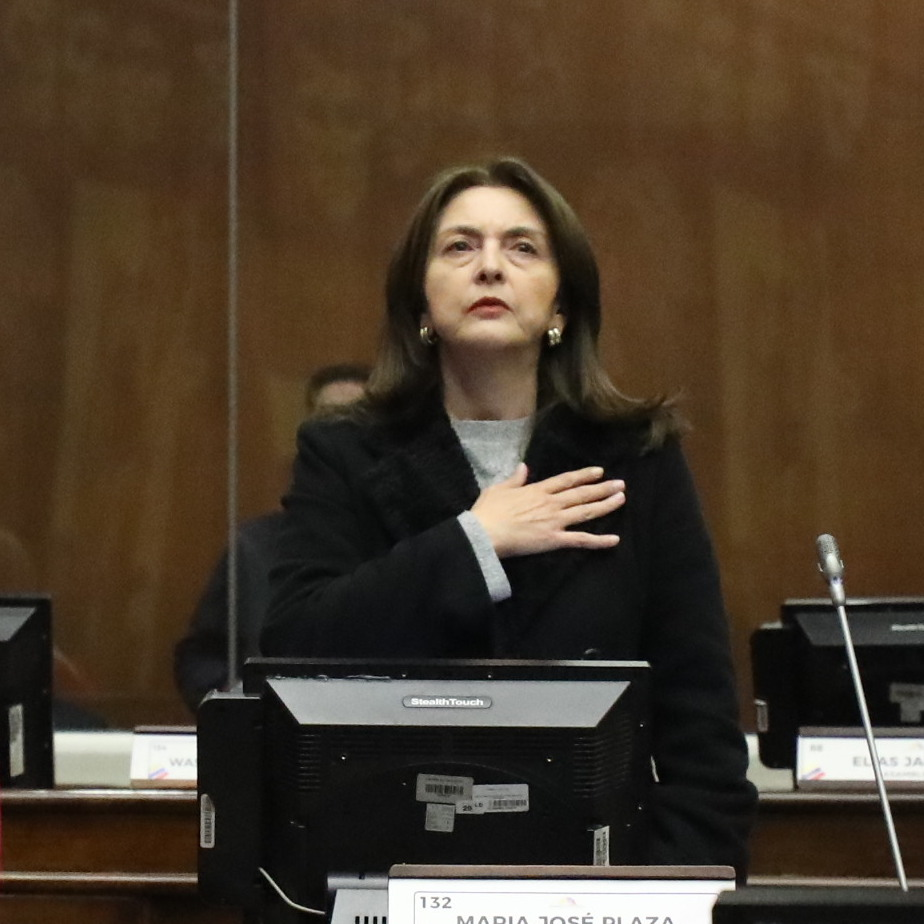
- Born: Maria Jose Plaza Gomez De La Torre; Quito, Ecuador
- Occupation: politician
- Known for: member of the National Assembly
- Term: 2021-2023

Maria Jose Plaza Gomez De La Torre known as Maria Jose Plaza is an Ecuadorian politician from Quito. She was elected to the National Assembly in 2021 for the province of Pichincha. She took an interest in sports and mental health.

== Life ==
She was born in Quito into a family involved in politics. Both her great-grandfather, Leonidas Plaza, and her grandfather, Galo Plaza, had been Presidents of Ecuador.

From 1995 to 2021, she was a company's general manager. She was elected to the National Assembly in 2021 for the province of Pichincha.

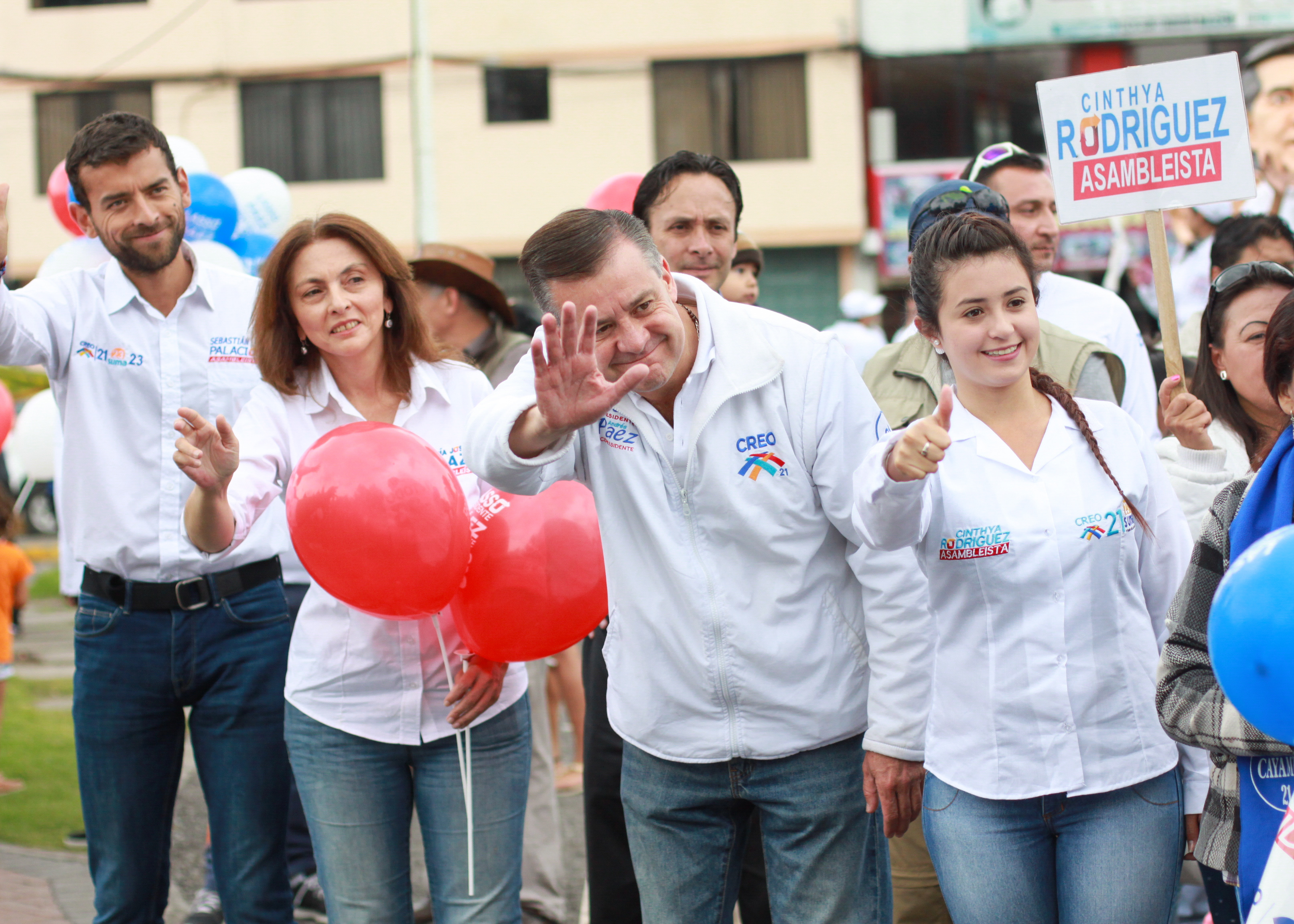
Sebastián Palacios, María José Plaza, Andres Paez & Cinthya Rodríguez campaigning in 2017

Plaza was elected to be the Vice President of the National Assembly's Commission on the Right to Health and Sport and served until 2023. She was also the Secretary of the Parliamentary Thematic Group for the Promotion and Popularization of Sport.

In June 2022 one of the National Assembly's vice Presidents, Yeseña Guamaní, was called to defend a charge of breach of duties made by Jhajaira Urresta. A committee was formed consisting of Patricia Mendoza, Mireya Pazmiño, Elina Narváez, Rocio Guanoluisa and Plaza to consider Urresta's complaint. Guamani did not recognise the authority of the committee.

Plaza was the President of the Interparliamentary Friendship Group between Ecuador and Spain.

The President of Ecuador Guillermo Lasso brought in the constitution clause number 148, known as Mutual death in May 2023 when he knew that he was about to be impeached. This required all of the National Assembly members, including Plaza to resign although they could stand for re-election.

Plaza was credited (by her party) in 2023 with initiating Ecuador's first law concerning mental health. She credited a meeting she had with Mexican Sarai Núñez Cerón and the Argentinian Gisela Scaglia the previous year. Their experiences influenced the law's design, which was being created as the country emerged from the COVID-19 pandemic.
