= Elina Narváez =

Ecuadorian politician

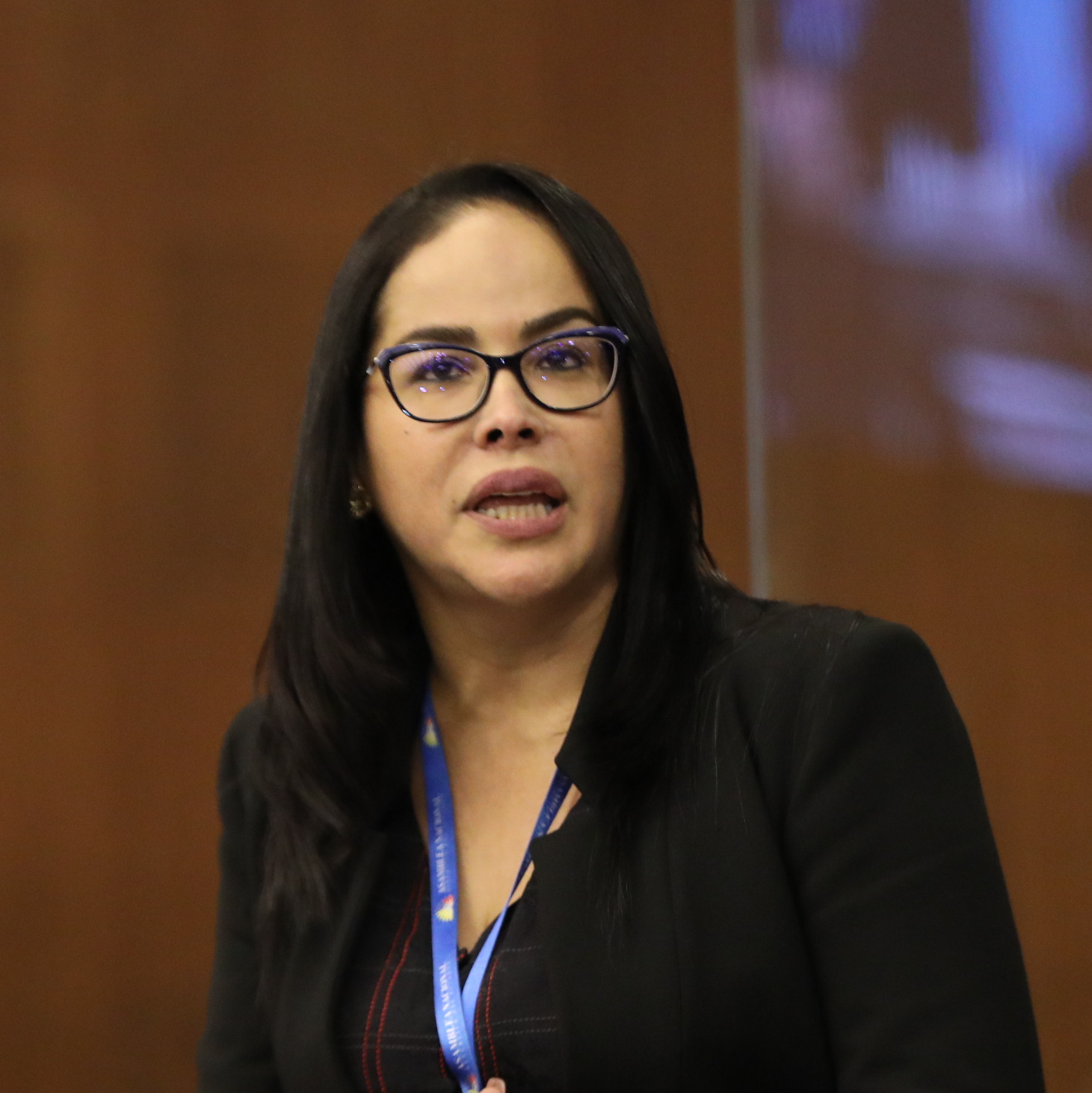
- Born: Elina Alexandra Narváez Mendieta
- Occupation: politician
- Known for: member of the National Assembly
- Parent: Mariana Mendieta

Elina Alexandra Narváez Mendieta is an Ecuadorian politician who joined the National Assembly to take over the seat of César Rohon after he resigned.

== Life ==
She was the daughter of Mariana Mendieta who became the mayor of Duran and the sister of Dalton Narváez.

Narváez was elected as an alternate to the National Assembly. She took over the seat of César Rohon after he resigned in March 2022 because of his disappointment by the inaction of the government to improve the lot of its electorate. Rohon was annoyed that the assembly had forgiven the actions of 268 people, although some thought it was because he had failed to be chosen to lead his party. Rohon had resigned from his party but Narváez took her own line and supported that PSC party. In May 2023 she denied that she was being rejected by Social Christian Party (PSC). The next day Estaban Torres who leads for the PSC bench revealed that Narváez had resigned. Narváez then made it clear why she was dissatisfied.

In June 2022 one of the National Assembly's vice Presidents, Yeseña Guamaní, was called to defend a charge of breach of duties made by Jhajaira Urresta. A multi-party committee was formed consisting of Patricia Mendoza, Mireya Pazmiño, Rocio Guanoluisa, María José Plaza and Narváez to consider Urresta's complaint.

In November 2022, she and Esteban Torres proposed a new law to assist animal welfare.

The President of Ecuador Guillermo Lasso brought in the constitution clause number 148 known as Mutual death in May 2023 when he was about to be impeached. This clause required all of the National Assembly members including Narváez to resign, although they could stand for re-election.
