= Johanna Ortiz =

Politician from Ecuador (born 1987)

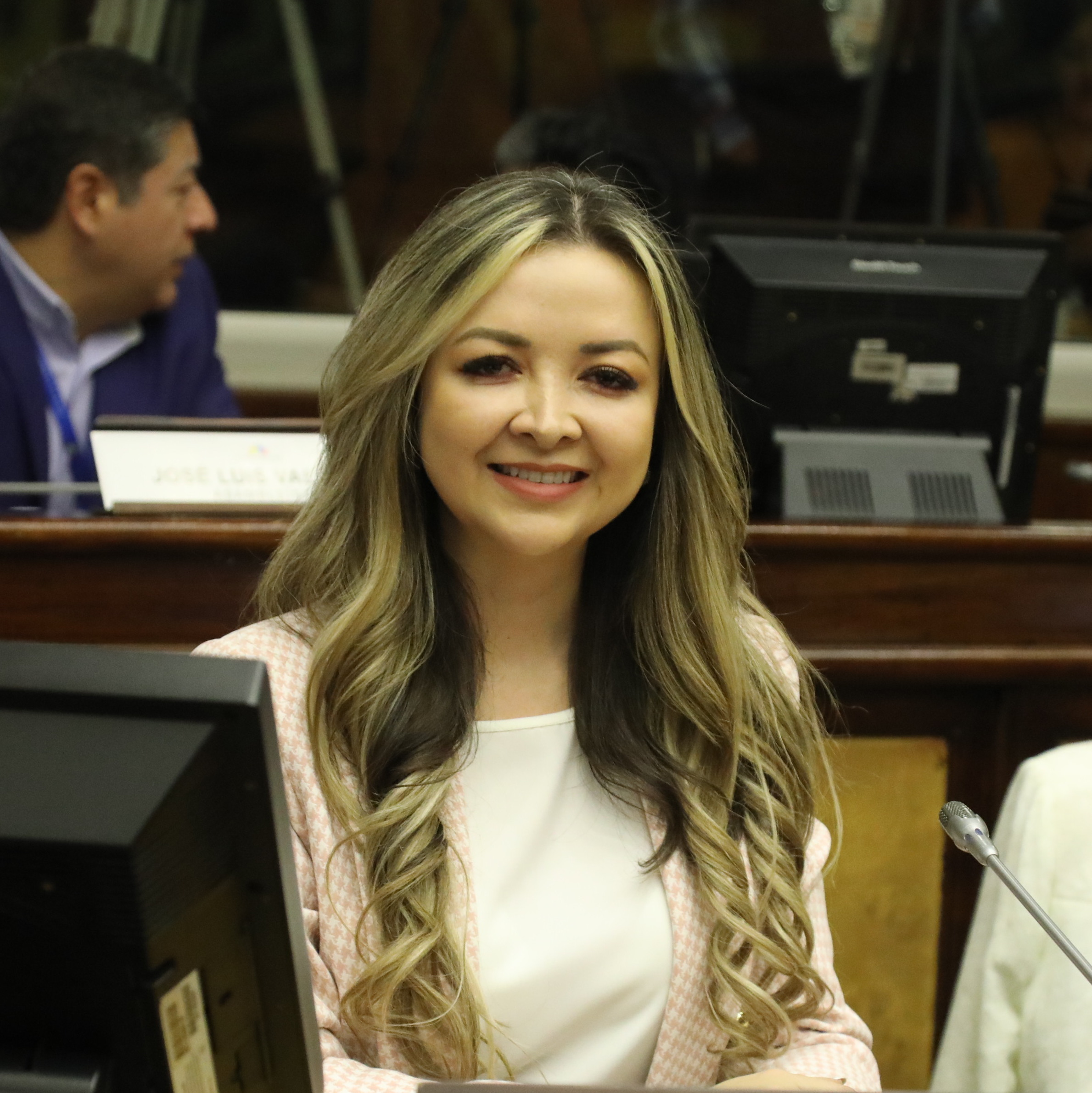
- Ortiz in the National Assembly in November 2023
- Born: c.1987
- Occupations: governor and member of the National Assembly

Johanna Cecibel Ortiz Villavicencio (born 1987) is an Ecuadorian politician. She has been the governor of Loja and a member of the National Assembly.

== Life ==
Ortiz was born in about 1987. Her first degree in Social Communication and Advertising was from the University of Azuay. Her master's degree in Political and Corporate Communication was from the Spanish University of Navarra based in Pamplona. The Argentine University of Buenos Aires gave her a diploma in Gender and Feminist Movements.

She was the governor of Loja from 2014 until 2017.

She stood to represent Loja and her party the Democratic Center made her their first choice on their list. She emphasised improvements in education, health care, finance and labour relations. She wanted to improve the status and remuneration of teachers so that they can supply free education. Free health care is also important she said and a new health code would supply improved health care and prepare for emergencies.

She taught at the Private Technical University of Loja (UTPL).

She represented the Province of Loja in the Ecuador's National Assembly having been elected on 7 February 2021. There were then 137 members in the assembly. The other three, from Loja, were Manuel Medina Quizhpe, Lucía Placencia and Byron Maldonado Ontaneda and their first day in the assembly was on 7 May.

She successfully stood for re-election to the National Assembly again in 2023. The President of Ecuador Guillermo Lasso brought in an unusual constitution clause (number 148) known as Mutual death in May 2023 when he knew that he was about to be impeached. This required all of the National Assembly members to stand for re-election. Ortiz and many others stood for re-election.

After her re-election was confirmed, Ortiz outlined her and her party's plans. She intended that there would be training for prospective women politicians in Loja. She was also concerned about the job security of the 400,000 people in Equador who work via a digital platform. The assembly formed its commissions including the one on workers rights. Ortiz serves on this commission which includes Luzmila Abad, Fernanda Méndez, María Teresa Pasquel and it is led by Johnny Terán with Marcela Holguín as vice-President.
