= Susana González Rosado =

Ecuadorian politician (born 1973)

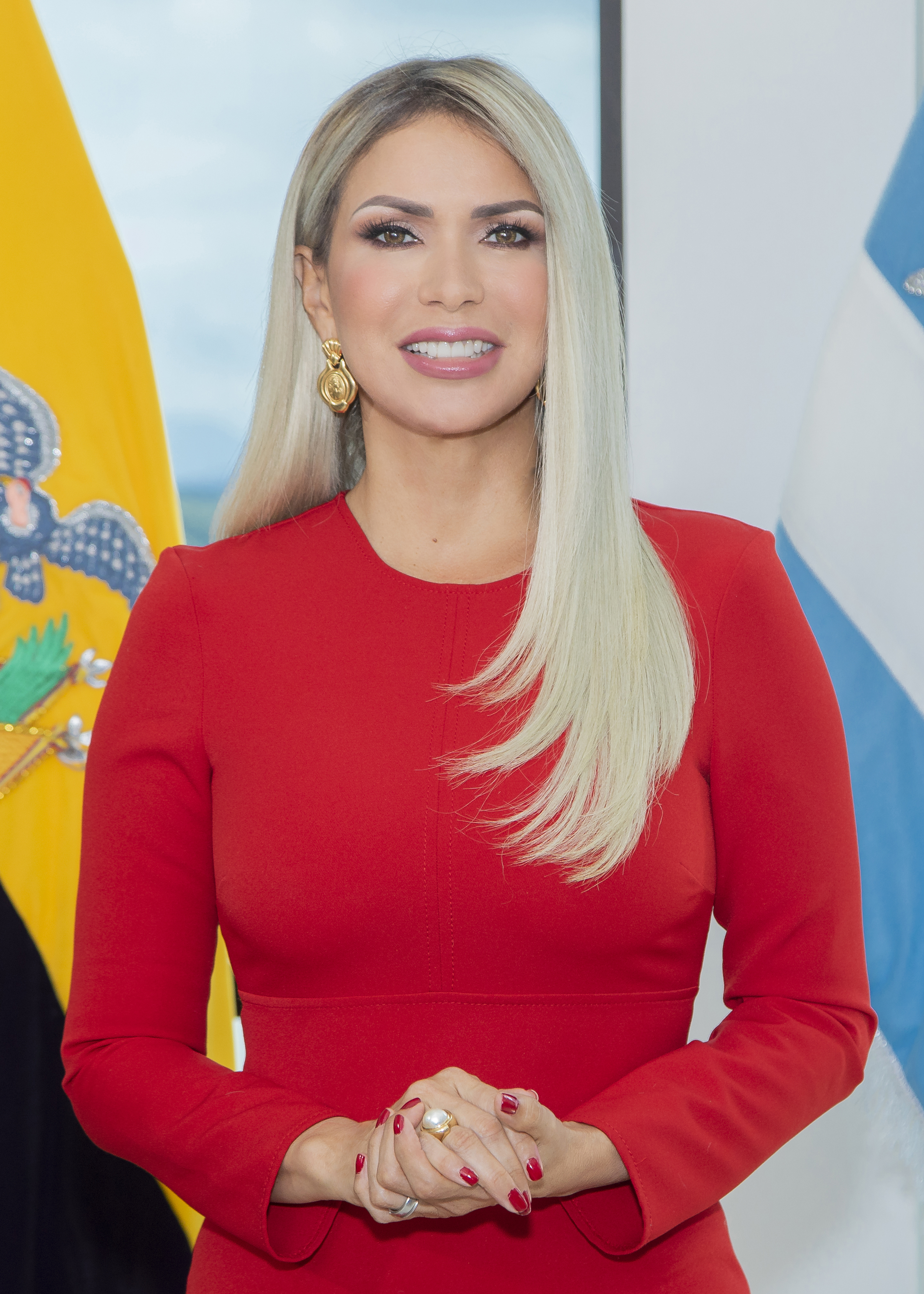

Prefect of Guayas Province
- In office 10 May 2019 – 14 May 2023
- Preceded by: Jorge Vélez
- Succeeded by: Marcela Aguiñaga

Municipal councilor of Guayaquil
- In office May 14, 2014 – December 18, 2018
- Constituency: Circunscripción Urbana 1

Member of the National Assembly of Ecuador
- In office July 31, 2009 – May 14, 2013
- Constituency: Guayas Province

Personal details
- Born: Dalia Susana González Rosado; March 12, 1973 (age 53) Guayaquil, Ecuador
- Party: Social Christian Party
- Other political affiliations: Madera de Guerrero
- Spouse: Antonio Sola Ortigosa (2012–present)
- Education: University of Guayaquil
- Occupation: Journalist, politician

Dalia Susana González Rosado (born March 12, 1973) is an Ecuadorian politician, former Prefect of Guayas Province. She is a professional journalist with a licentiate in Social Communication and master's degree in International Political Science and Diplomacy.

== Biography ==
Susana González Rosado was born Guayaquil on March 12, 1973. She is the daughter of Efraín González and Susana Rosado, and has five siblings.

She started working at age 14 as an assistant manager of a company during afternoons, while studying in the morning. She obtained a bachelor's degree at the Hispano-American College, and later completed her studies at Laica Vicente Rocafuerte University. She earned a master's degree in International Sciences and Diplomacy at the Antonio Parra Velasco Institute of Diplomacy at the University of Guayaquil in 2005.

She has been married to Spanish businessman Antonio Sola Ortigosa since 2012.

== Political career ==
During the government of Alfredo Palacio, González Rosado served as vice-minister of the Ministry of Foreign Trade, dictating guidelines for the formulation of programs and projects, executing policies, plans, and studies for the development of competitive foreign trade and industry, and the approval and legalization of share rights. She was also political adviser to mayor Jaime Nebot from 2007 to 2009.

=== Member of the National Assembly ===
In 2009, she was elected to the National Assembly of Ecuador representing Guayas Province, where she was appointed to the Permanent Specialized Commission of Food Sovereignty and Development of the Agriculture and Fisheries sector.

=== Municipal councilor ===
In 2014, González Rosado was elected a Guayaquil municipal councilor for the Social Christian Party in coalition with Madera de Guerrero.

While in office she directed the Environment and Tourism and Urban Development commissions. Appointed by the Board Commission, she carried out the roles that the Council imparts. Likewise, she participated in the study and resolution of all the municipal political propositions that correspond to the council. She resigned her seat in December 2018 in order to run for viceprefect of Guayas Province.

=== Viceprefect ===
Susana González Rosado was elected viceprefect of Guayas Province on March 24, 2019. She officially received her credentials on May 10.
