= Marcela Holguín =

Politician from Ecuador

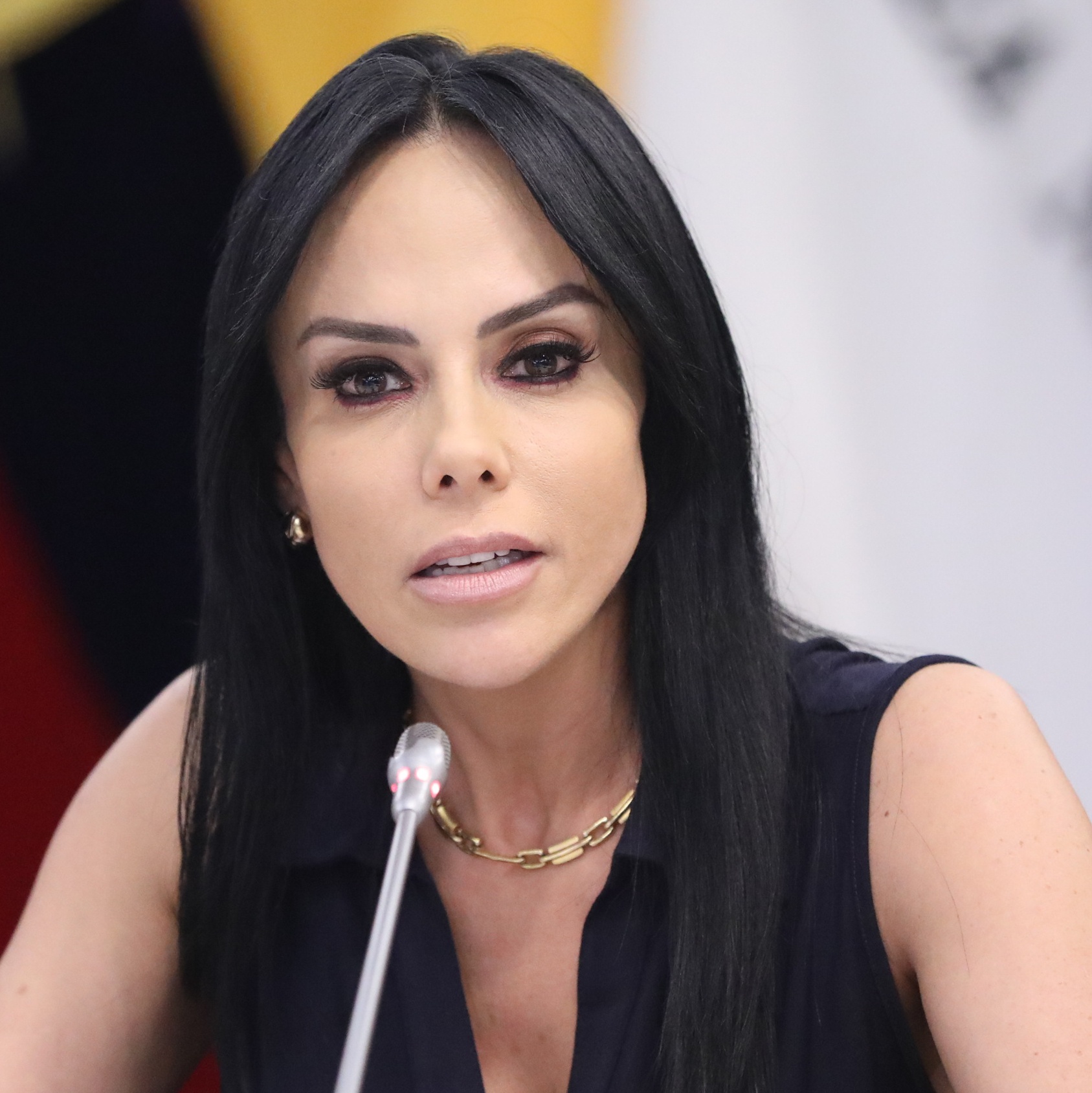
- in 2022
- Born: November 23, 1973 (age 52); Manabí Province, Ecuador
- Education: Central University of Ecuador
- Occupations: politician and journalist
- Known for: first Vice President of the National Assembly of Ecuador since July 21, 2022.
- Political party: Alianza País

Marcela Holguín or Marcela Priscila Holguín Naranjo (born November 23, 1973) is an Ecuadorian politician. In 2002 she became the first Vice President of the National Assembly of Ecuador.

== Life ==
Holguín was born in Manabí Province, Ecuador in 1973. Holguín graduated from the Central University of Ecuador, before she gained her master's degree in communication in 2007 at the Andean University "Simón Bolívar".

In 2006 she began a career in journalism working for Ecuavisa. She then became active in the Alianza País political party and she was their candidate for the National Assembly in Pichincha's North Central District.

In 2019 Holguin was one of three members of the National Assembly investigated by the Attorney General for allegedly inciting violence during the General Strike in October 2019. The other two were Marcela Aguiñaga and Daniel Romero.

On July 21, 2022 she was elected as the National Assembly's First Vice President.

She successfully stood for re-election to the National Assembly again in 2023. The President of Ecuador Guillermo Lasso had brought in an unusual constitution clause (number 148) known as Mutual death in May 2023 when he knew that he was about to be impeached. This required all of the National Assembly members to stand for re-election.

The assembly formed its commissions including the one on workers' rights which includes Johanna Ortiz, Luzmila Abad, Fernanda Méndez, and María Teresa Pasquel and it is led by Johnny Terán with Holguín as the vice-President.
