= Yeseña Guamaní =

Ecuadorian politician

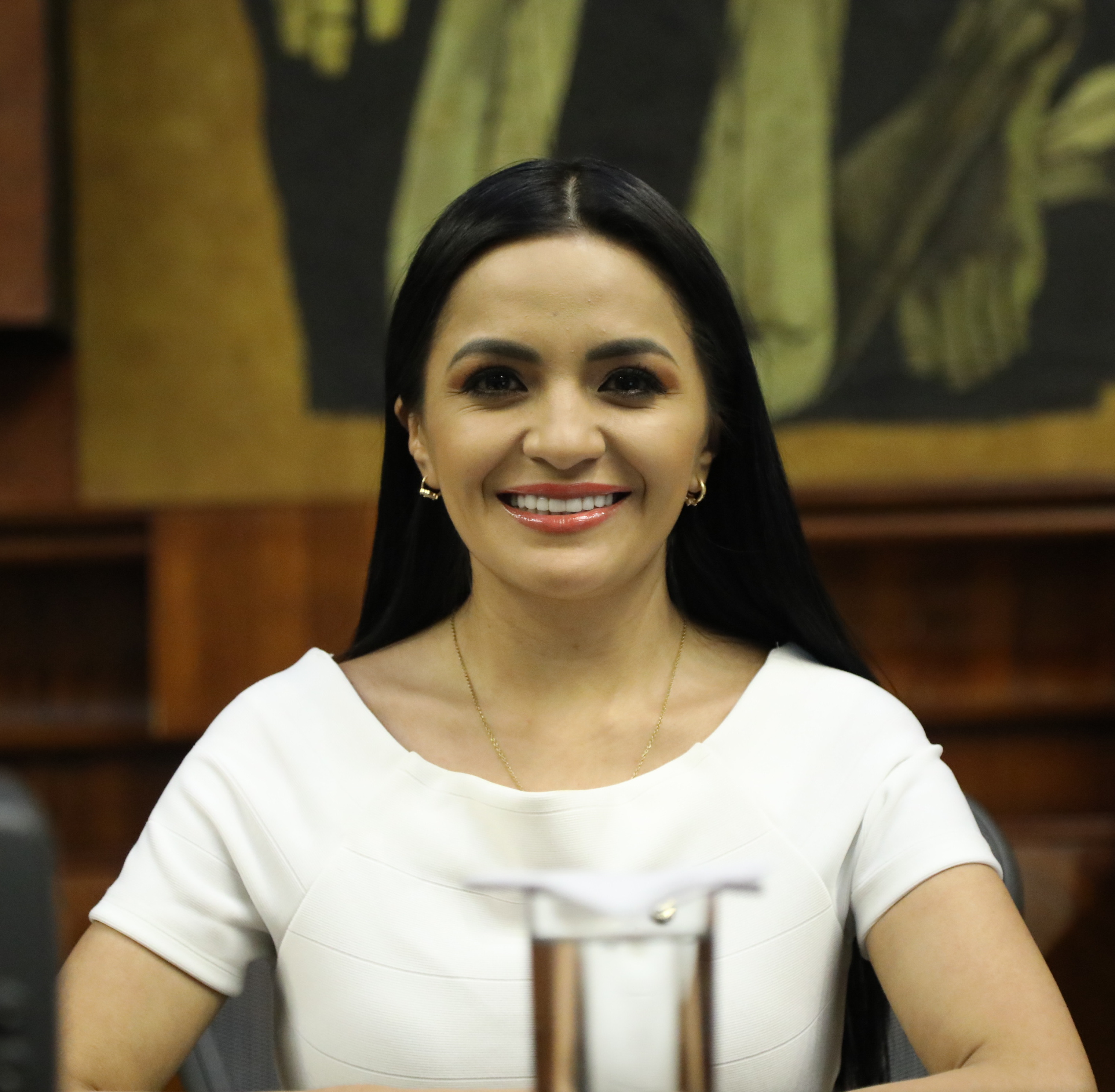
- Born: Ludvia Yeseña Guamáni Vásquez
- Occupation: politician
- Political party: Democratic Left

Ludvia Yeseña Guamáni Vásquez is an Ecuadorian politician. She represents a constituency in the Andes and the Democratic Left party. Until 2022 she was a vice-president of the National Assembly.

== Life ==
She was born in about 1987. Her school was called the Domingo Savio Salesian Educational Unit and it was in Cayambe. She studied Social Communication at the Politecnica Salesiana University in Quito.

Her father Edwin Marcelo Guamaní and his brother, Reinado, were both local politicians. Her uncle was the mayor and her father became the councilor for the Cayambe Canton. Her father was a member of the Democratic Left and that became her party.

She worked in state radio and then state TV for ten years. She became a TV presenter and she then worked at Ecuador's Ministry of Education and its Ministry of the Environment. Guamaní is keen on wild animals in her country.

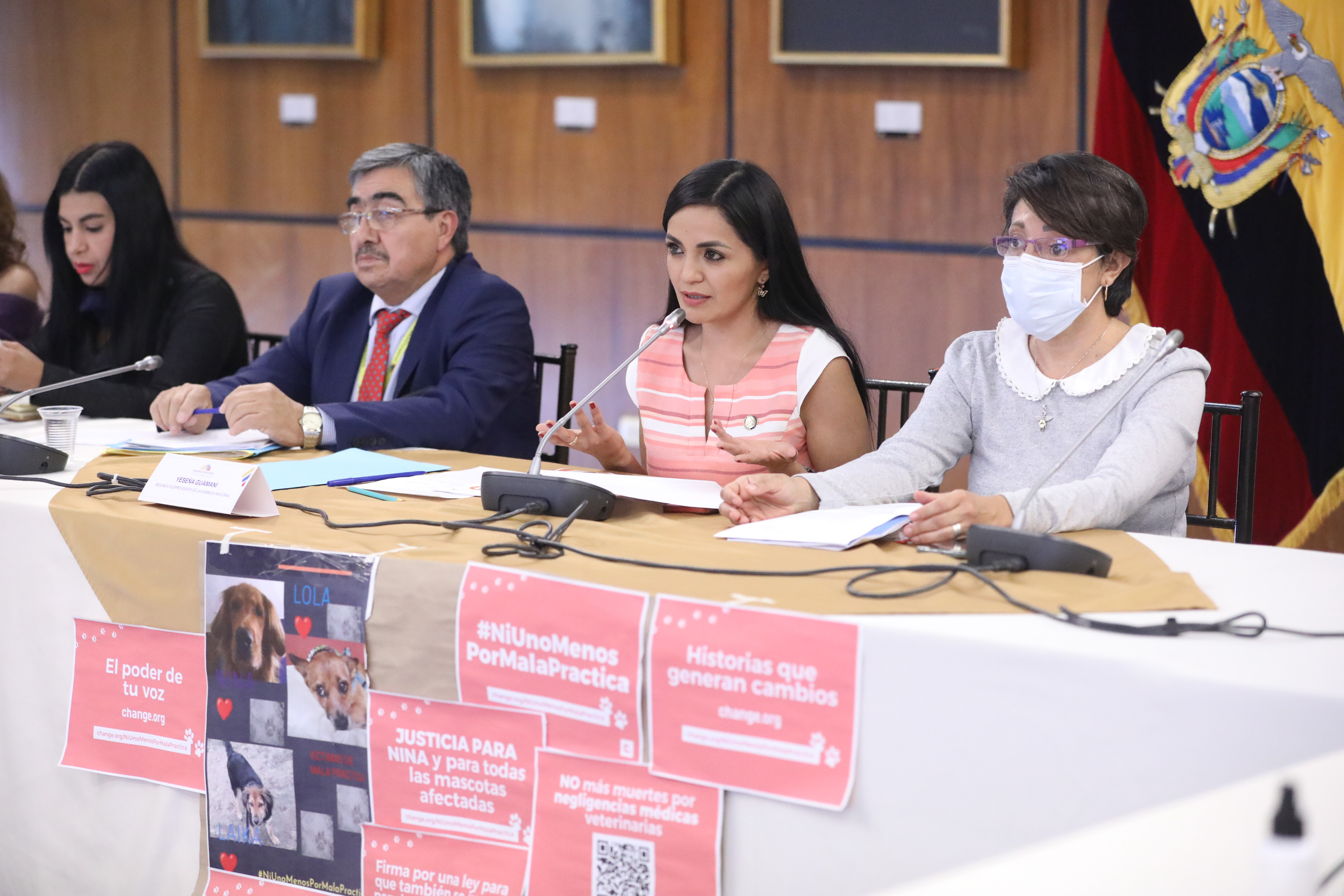
Guamaní presents a law relating to companion animals in April 2022

She was elected to the National Assembly in February 2021. In October her fellow Democratic Left member Bella Jimenez was dismissed after an investigation found that she had been taking money in exchange for influence. Jiminez was a second vice-president and for some time there was a debate about whether Guamaní would be her replacement.

Guamaní was voted to be the National Assembly's second vice president. She is her party's vice-president and she had to deal with disputes arising from a recent change in leadership. In 2022 there were five Democratic party members who were not voting with the party. The five members were Johanna Moreira, Alejandro Jaramillo, Rocío Guanoluisa, Javier Santos and Lucía Placencia. This has raised difficulty with the important Council of Legislative Administration who have had difficulty in obtaining a quorum. Alejandro Jaramillo and then Johanna Moreira were expelled from the party.

In June 2022 she was called to defend a charge of breach of duties. Jhajaira Urresta alleged that Guamani had interfered with the running of the Legislative Administration Council by putting forward a motion that the Constitutional Court needed to be consulted before Viviana Veloz's tax reform bill was approved. Guamani noted that it was her job to put forward motions. A committee was formed consisting of Patricia Mendoza, Rocío Guanoluisa, Mireya Pazmiño, María José Plaza and Elina Narváez to consider the complaint. Guamani did nor recognise the authority of the committee and singled out Rocío Guanoluisa because she was no longer a supporter of the Democratic Left party.

In July 2022 the position of vice-president of the assembly was vacant. There was a political stand-off as the parties could not agree. The Pachakutik party proposed Mireya Pazmiño and Mario Ruiz and the Democratic Left offered Jhoanna Moreira. Union for Hope aka UNES offered the names of Marcela Holguín, Sofia Espín and Esther Cuesta.
