= Rocío Valarezo =

Ecuadorian politician

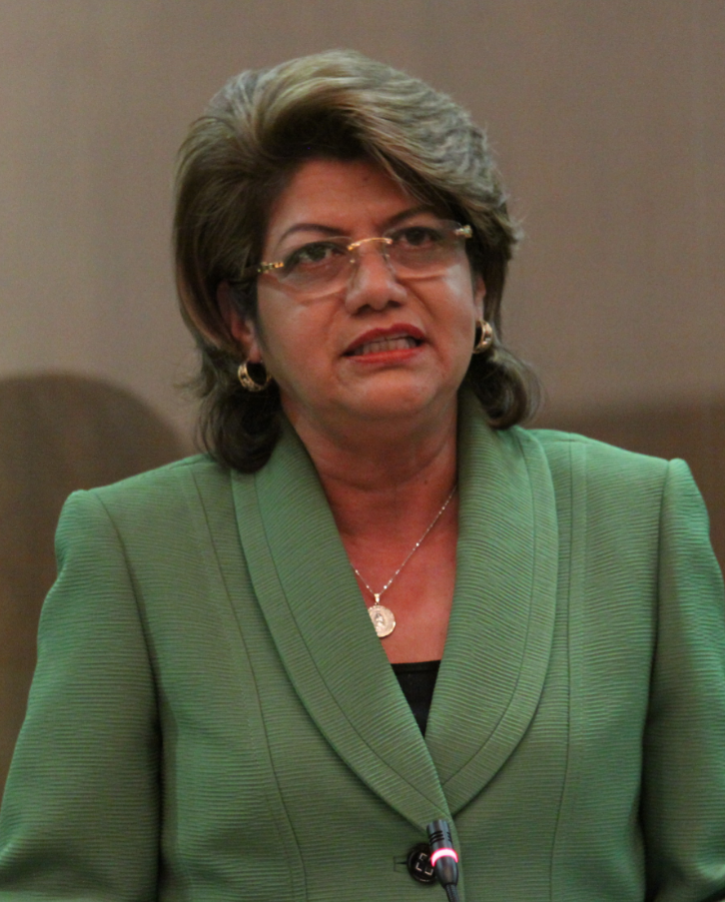
- Born: 1959 (age 66–67); Santa Rosa

Rocío Valarezo (born 1959/60) is an Ecuadorian politician. She trained as a teacher and in politics she rose to be second member of the Legislative Administration Council.

== Life ==
Valarezo was born in 1959 or 1960. She completed her education at the University of Guayaquil, where she obtained a degree in education, after giving up her first choice of dentistry. Her first job as a teacher was at the Antonio José de Sucre school, in Santa Rosa. She also worked at the Zoila Ugarte de Landívar school in the canton of El Guabo.

Valarezo began her political life as a substitute councilor for the Santa Rosa canton. In 1998, she was elected alternate deputy for Hugo Quevedo, of the Social Christian Party. In the 2000 election, she was elected provincial councilor of El Oro for the same party and some time later, she joined the Ecuadorian Roldosista Party and was re-elected as their provincial councilor.

For the legislative elections in Ecuador in 2009, she was elected national assembly member representing El Oro for the Regional Autonomous Movement (MAR). During the first two years, she held the fourth position on the Legislative Administration Council. In 2011 she was appointed second vice president of Ecuador's National Assembly for the period 2011-2013 as part of the alliance between the MAR and the official Alianza PAIS movement. In the legislative elections of 2013, she was re-elected to the position of assembly member and was again appointed second member of the Legislative Administration Council.

Her career has advanced quietly and despite not courting the media. She has integrity and she has avoided scandal. She has said that she intends to return to teaching once her political life ends.
