= Mariana Mendieta =

Ecuadorian politician

Mariana de Jesús Mendieta

City Council of Durán
- Incumbent
- Assumed office 2014

Mayor of Durán, Ecuador
- In office 2000–2008

City Council of Durán
- In office 1998–2000

Personal details
- Born: 10 April 1956 (age 68); Chone, Ecuador
- Occupation: Politician

Mariana de Jesús Mendieta (born 10 April 1956) is an Ecuadorian politician. She was the first woman to hold the mayoralty of Durán.

== Biography ==
Mariana Mendieta was born in Chone, Ecuador, on 10 April 1956. She entered politics when she joined Ecuadorian Radical Liberal Party in support of Raúl Clemente Huerta and Carlos Luis Plaza Aray. After the deaths of both men, she left the Radical Liberals and joined the Social Christian Party. In 1998, she was elected to the City Council of Durán. During her inauguration, Mendieta was attacked by assailants she identified as being supporters of incumbent mayor Oswaldo Peñaherrera, a member of the Ecuadorian Roldosist Party. She was so badly beaten that she had to abort her pregnancy at that time and developed a colostomy. Mendieta was dismissed from her position following a controversy wherein, during a cantonal meeting, she stripped off her pants and underwear to display her colostomy bag and accuse Mayor Peñaherrera of orchestrating the attack. She was restored to her seat by the Constitutional Court.

Mendieta resigned from her town council seat to stand as a candidate for the 2000 provincial elections as a representative of the Social Christian Party, and was elected Mayor of Durán. She was reelected in the 2004 provincial elections. Her mayoralty was focused on the maintenance of roads and parks.

In July 2007, Mendieta was accused of embezzlement over alleged administrative irregularities.

== Private life ==
Two of her children are Elina Narváez and Dalton Narváez Mendieta. Dalton also became mayor while Elina is a member of the National Assembly from March 2022.
