= Universidad Técnica Particular de Loja =

Private university in Loja, Ecuador (est. 1971)

- Universidad Técnica Particular de Loja
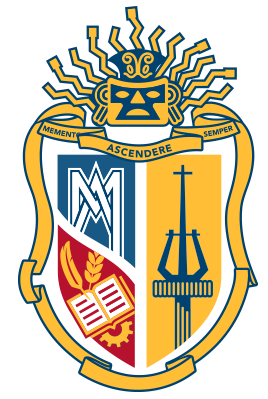
- Coat of arms of UTPL
- Motto: Memento ascendere semper
- Motto in English: Always remember to ascend
- Type: Private
- Established: May 3, 1971; 55 years ago
- Affiliations: ODUCAL; AIESAD; UTPL Science & Technology Park
- Religious affiliation: Catholic (Idente Missionaries)
- Rector: Santiago Acosta Aide
- Academic staff: 1,962 (2024)
- Students: 50,411 (2024)
- Location: Loja, Ecuador; 3.98676°S 79.19893°W
- Campus: Urban (San Cayetano Alto)
- Website: www.utpl.edu.ec (in Spanish)
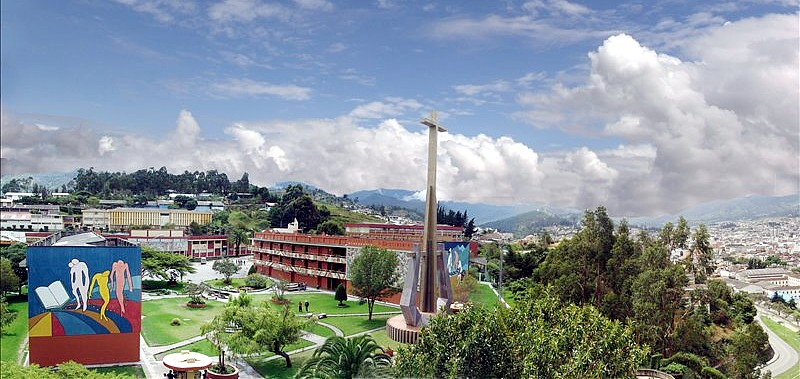

The Universidad Técnica Particular de Loja (UTPL; Spanish: literally "Technical Private University of Loja"; also rendered in English as the "Technical University of Loja") is a private research university in Loja, Ecuador, known for its nationwide distance education model and applied research initiatives. Founded on 3 May 1971 by executive decree, the university pioneered open and distance higher education in Ecuador in 1976, later expanding with a country-wide network of learning centers.

== History ==
UTPL was created by Executive Decree No. 646, published in Registro Oficial No. 217 on 5 May 1971, as an autonomous, private, non-profit institution headquartered in Loja.

The university pioneered open and distance higher education in Ecuador in 1976, initially in Education Sciences, later scaling to a nationwide network of learning centers; the first graduating class in the distance modality was in 1981. By the 2010s–2020s, UTPL reported more than 80 regional centers in Ecuador and international centers in New York, Madrid and Rome linked to its distance network.

To strengthen applied research and university–industry collaboration, UTPL launched the Parque Científico y Tecnológico (Science and Technology Park) in Loja, a platform for prototyping, entrepreneurship, and technology transfer.

== Academics ==
UTPL offers undergraduate and graduate programs in on-campus and distance modes. As of 2024, the university reports 50,411 unique students and 1,962 academic staff across its faculties.

== Distance education ==
Since 1976 UTPL has operated a nationwide open and distance education model. External reviews place UTPL among early adopters of distance higher education in South America, with sustained expansion through regional learning centers and digital platforms. UTPL maintains an institutional repository (RiUTPL) for open dissemination of theses, publications and learning objects that support its blended and online delivery.

== Research and rankings ==
UTPL’s applied research ecosystem is anchored by its Science and Technology Park (Parque Científico y Tecnológico), a member of the International Association of Science Parks (IASP), which hosts observatories and initiatives focused on social innovation and sustainable territorial development.

In subject-based bibliometric rankings, UTPL is placed 3rd in Ecuador in the 2025 SCImago Institutions Rankings for the Education subject area. SCImago’s institutional profile lists UTPL’s output and impact across multiple areas over time.

UTPL also appears in general university directories and commercial rankings, including Times Higher Education and QS profiles, which emphasize its distance-learning network and regional presence.

== Science and innovation ==
The university operates the Parque Científico y Tecnológico (Science and Technology Park) in Loja to support applied research, prototyping, and university–industry collaboration.

== Library and open science ==
UTPL maintains the institutional repository RiUTPL to preserve and disseminate scholarly output and learning resources.
