= Mireya Pazmino =

Ecuadorian politician

Mireya Pazmiño
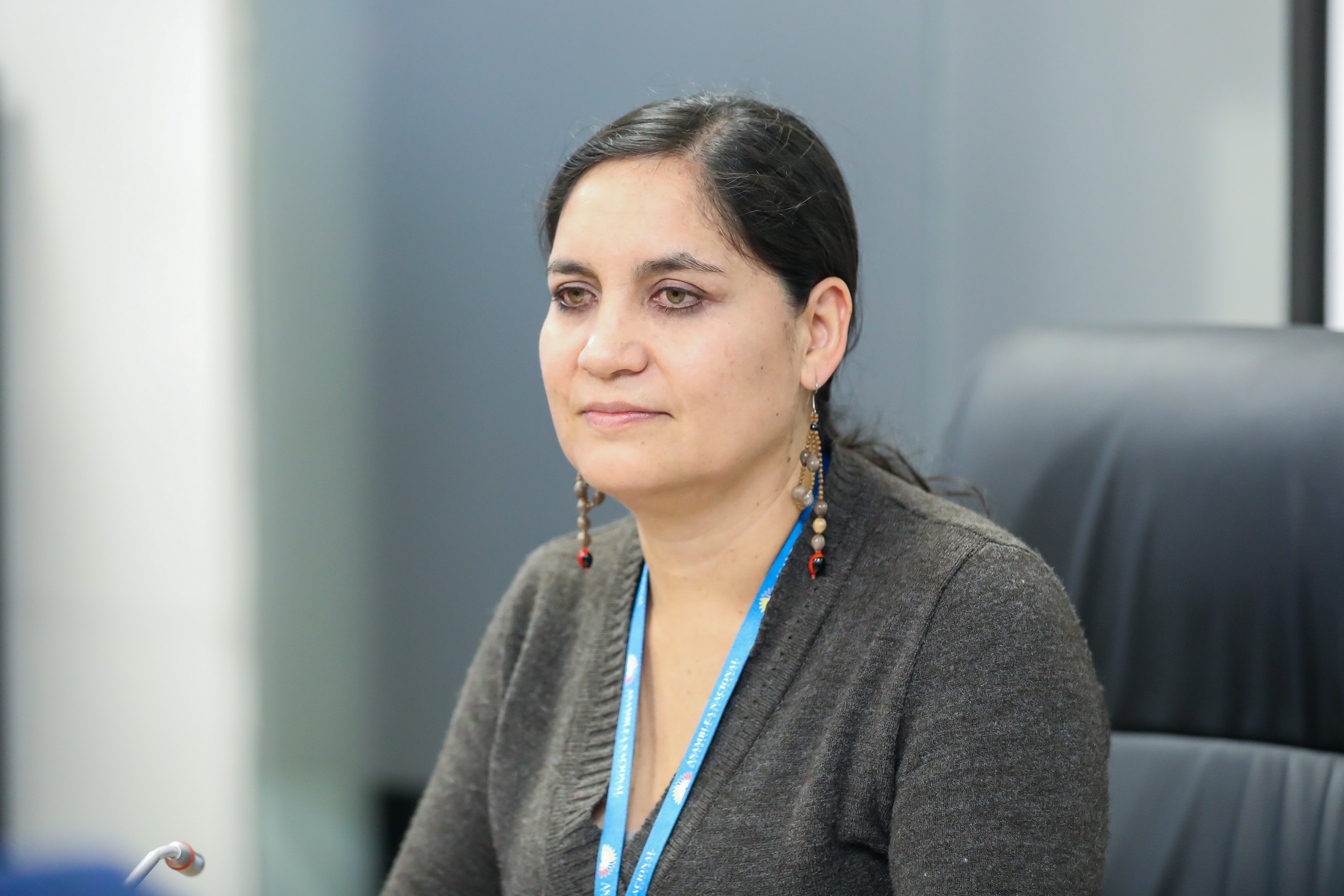
- in 2022
- Occupation: politician
- Known for: member of the National Assembly

Pazmiño Arregui Mireya Katerine is an Ecuadorian politician representing the province of Bolivar in the National Assembly. She is a member of the Pachakutik Plurinational Unity Movement – New Country party who has been an independent.

== Life ==
She took her first degree at the Universidad Técnica Particular de Loja in 2004. She qualified as a lawyer at the same institution in 2012 and she gained her masters there in 2015.

During 2017 and 2018 she was teaching at the State University of Bolívar. In 2021 she was elected to represent the province of Bolivar in Ecuador's National Assembly. She was a member of the Pachakutik Plurinational Unity Movement – New Country party. She was expelled from the party but she was returned by a vote in June 2021 when the expulsion was revoked.

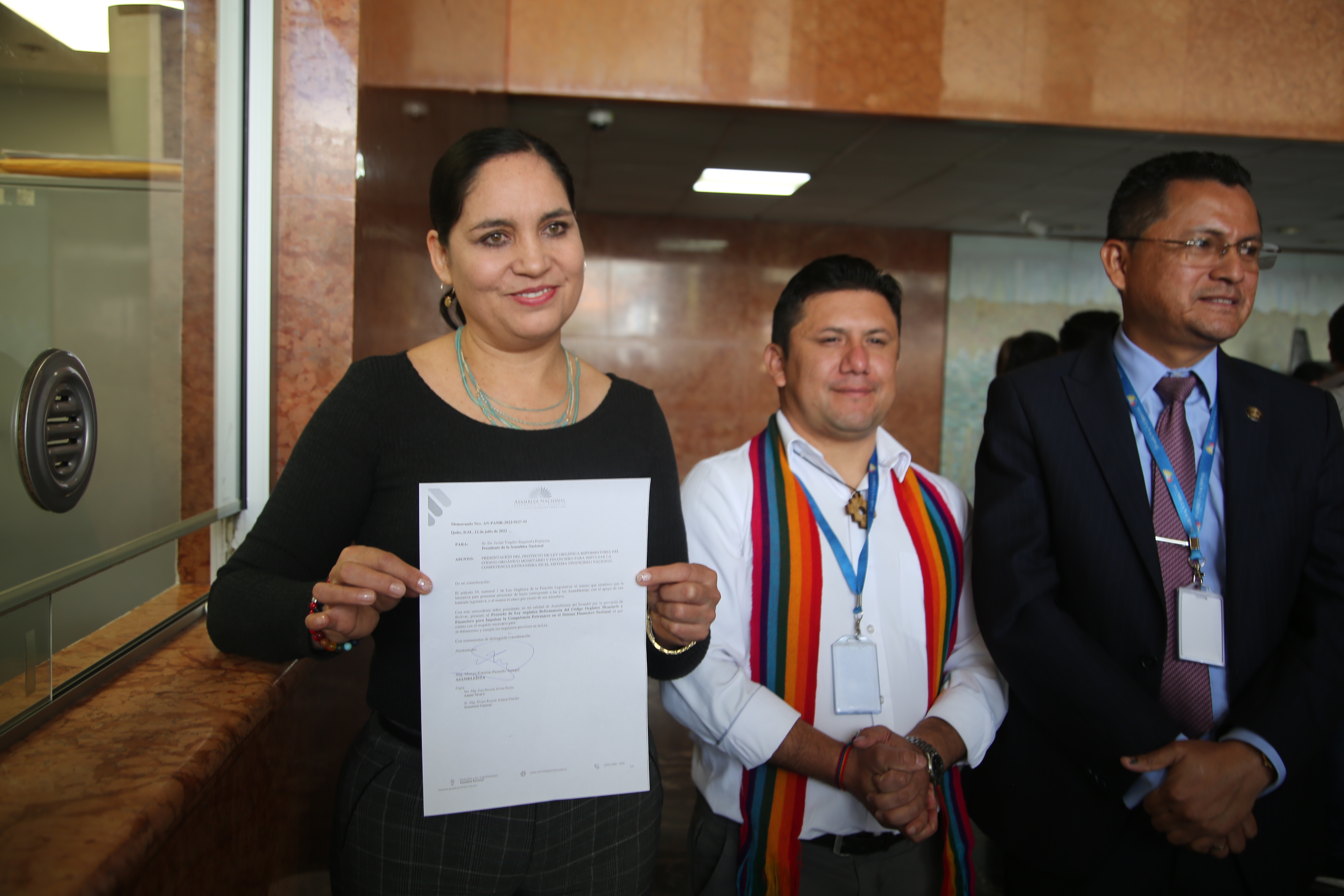
Mireya Pazmiño holding a draft of the Law for the Reform of the Financial and Monetary Organic Code.

She assumed the presidency of the Economic Regime Commission in 2021, following a controversial episode in which she refused to acknowledge the agreement that her then political movement, Pachakutik, had reached with the government.

On April 1, 2022, she was expelled from Pachakutik for contempt, not attending meetings, having agendas and not supporting the party's policies. The others excluded were Mario Ruíz, Patricia Sánchez, Fernando Cabascango, Darwin Pereira and Peter Calo.

In June Pazmiño led a proposal to repeal a Presidential decree that had declared "a state of emergency" in the provinces of Pichincha, Cotopaxi and Imbabura. Her proposal was supported by 71 other Assembly members. Leonidas Iza who leads the Confederation of Indigenous Nationalities of Ecuador and other parties involved with the national strike would be invited to the debate. In the same month one of the National Assembly's vice Presidents, Yeseña Guamaní, was called to defend a charge of breach of duties made by Jhajaira Urresta. A committee was formed consisting of Patricia Mendoza, Elina Narváez, Rocio Guanoluisa, María José Plaza and Pazmiño to consider Urresta's complaint.

On July 12, 2022, she presented a draft for a Law which purpose was to improve the Monetary and Financial Organic Code to encourage foreign competition in the national financial system.

The President of Ecuador Guillermo Lasso brought in the constitution clause number 148 known as Mutual death in May 2023 when he knew that he was about to be impeached. This required all of the National Assembly members including Pazmiño to resign although they could stand for re-election. Later that year she was an ex-assembly member serving on a panel to choose the top judges in the country.
