= Johanna Moreira =

Ecuadorian politician

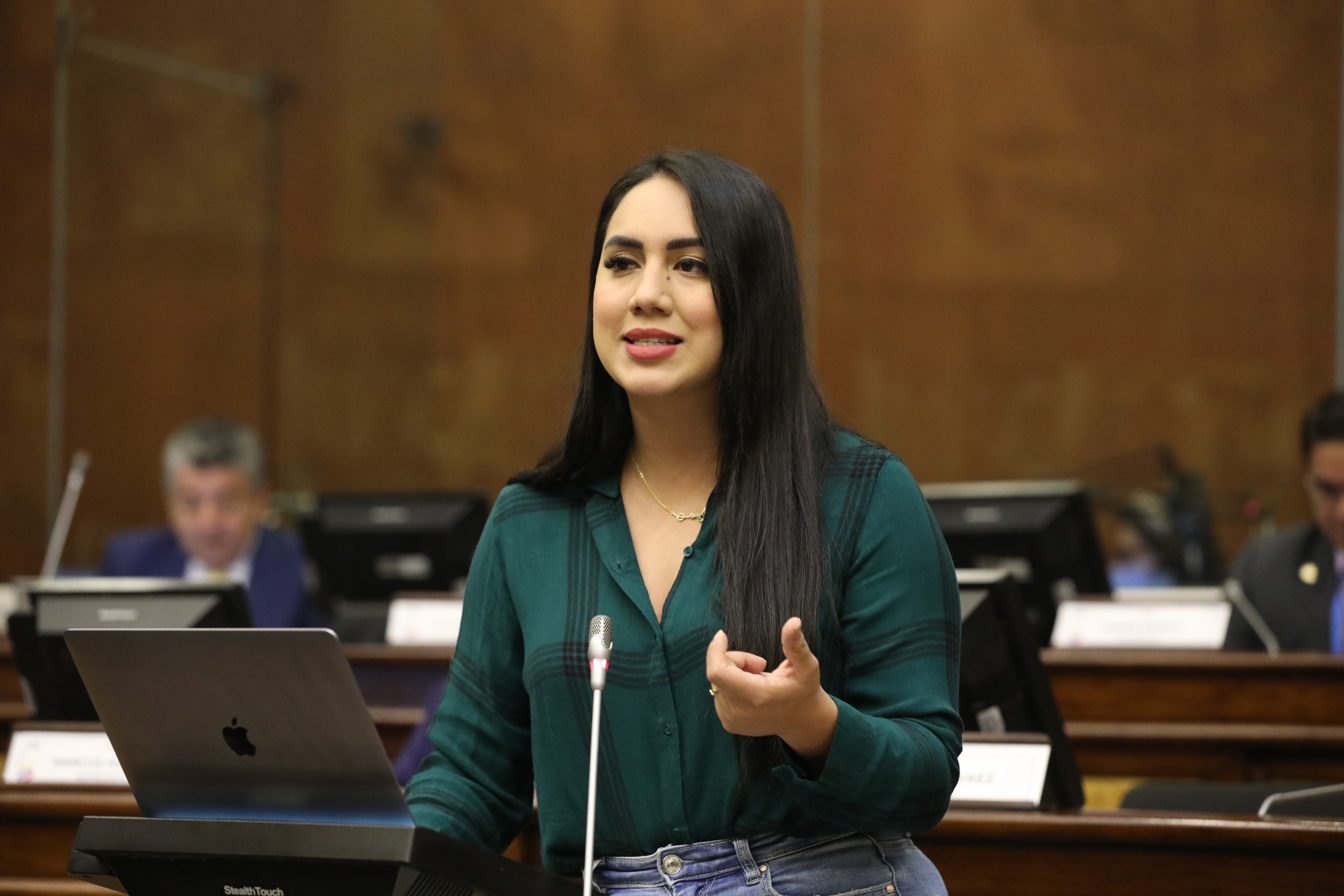
- Born: 1996 (age 29–30)
- Other name: Johanna Moreira Cordova
- Education: Technical University of Machala
- Occupation: politician
- Known for: elected to Ecuador's 4th National Assembly
- Political party: Democratic Left party until April 2022

Johanna Nicole Moreira Cordova (born 1996) is a member of the National Assembly of Ecuador. She was a member of the Democratic Left party and she represents the province of El Oro. In 2021 when she was elected she was the youngest member of the assembly. She took the privileged place of fourth position on the Legislative Administration Council in 2021.

== Life ==
Moreira studied law at the Technical University of Machala before starting to practise at the Alfaro Law Firm in Machala.

She became a member of the Democratic Left party and she was their candidate for the province of El Oro. In 2021 when she was elected she was the youngest member of the National Assembly of Ecuador. She was elected to the fourth position on the Legislative Administration Council on 15 May 2021 after being proposed by her Democratic Left colleague Xavier Santos. Her position was confirmed with 70 votes in favour although 53 members abstained.

She is concerned about period poverty in her country where women cannot afford sanitary napkins. On average women in Ecuador spend 42 dollars per year on menstrual health where they can afford the expense.

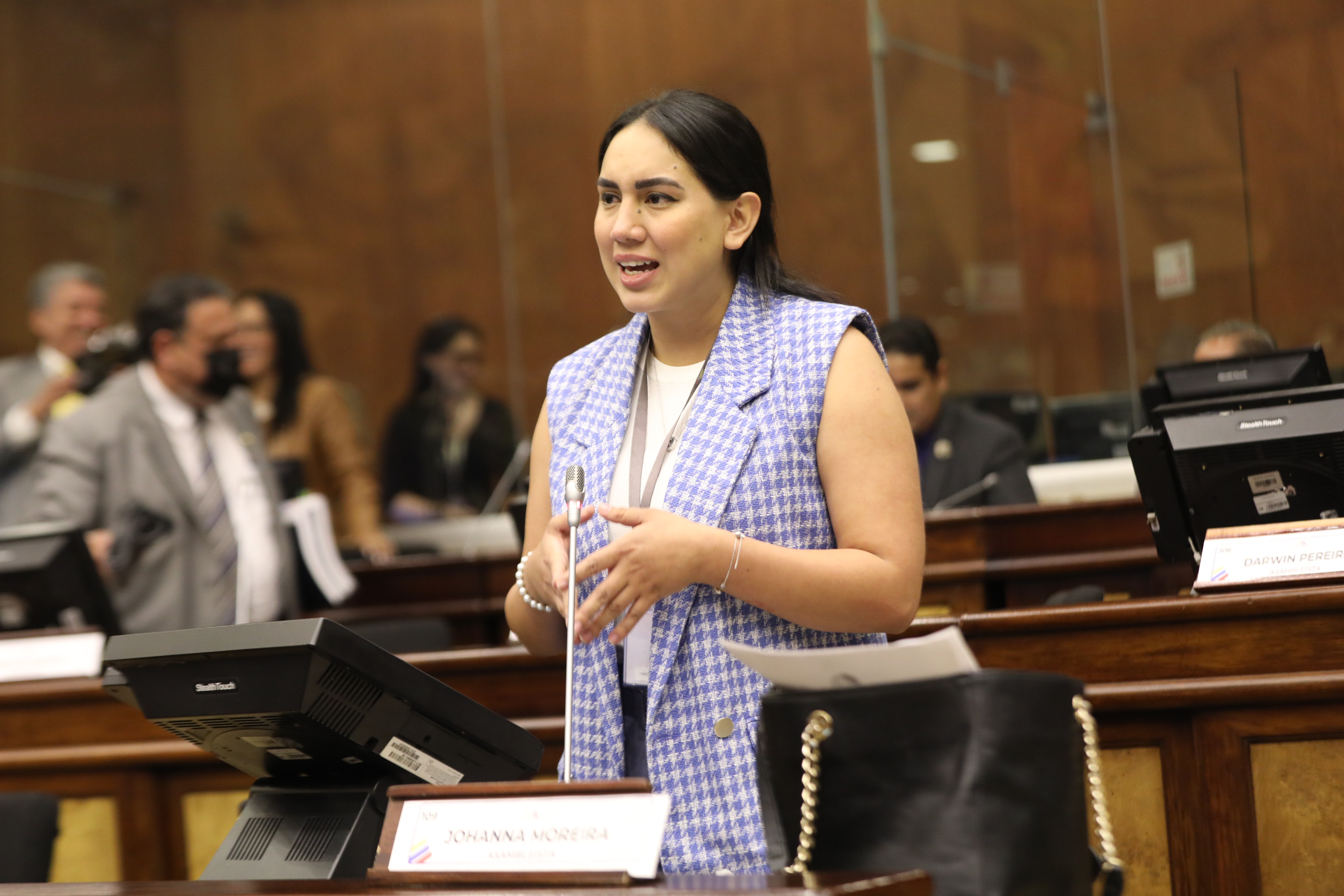
Moreira intervening in the National Assembly in April 2022

In the first ten months of her service in the assembly she has been one of the most frequest people to intervene during plenary sessions. An average member intervened about ten times but Moreira was in the top ten with over 30 interventions.

On 20 April 2022 she was excluded from the Democratic Left by Guillermo Herrera who is the party's National President. Moreira had been accused by another assembly member from her party, Yeseña Guamaní, of not supporting the party line. Guamani and Herrera believed that she should have acted differently during a debate in the Legislative Administration Council about the President Guadalupe Llori's alleged breach of duties. The expulsion of Moreira is at some cost to her former party as they now have only thirteen members which means they are no longer eligible for some privileges. Moreira had been unpopular before the expulsion because she and Alejandro Jaramillo had supported a proposal to allow abortion in the case of rape victims. This had been controversial within the party. Alejandro Jaramillo had already been ejected from the party before Moreira's expulsion. Amada Ortiz, another fellow party member, left the party after a dispute in May 2021.
