= María Fernanda Astudillo =

Ecuadorian politician

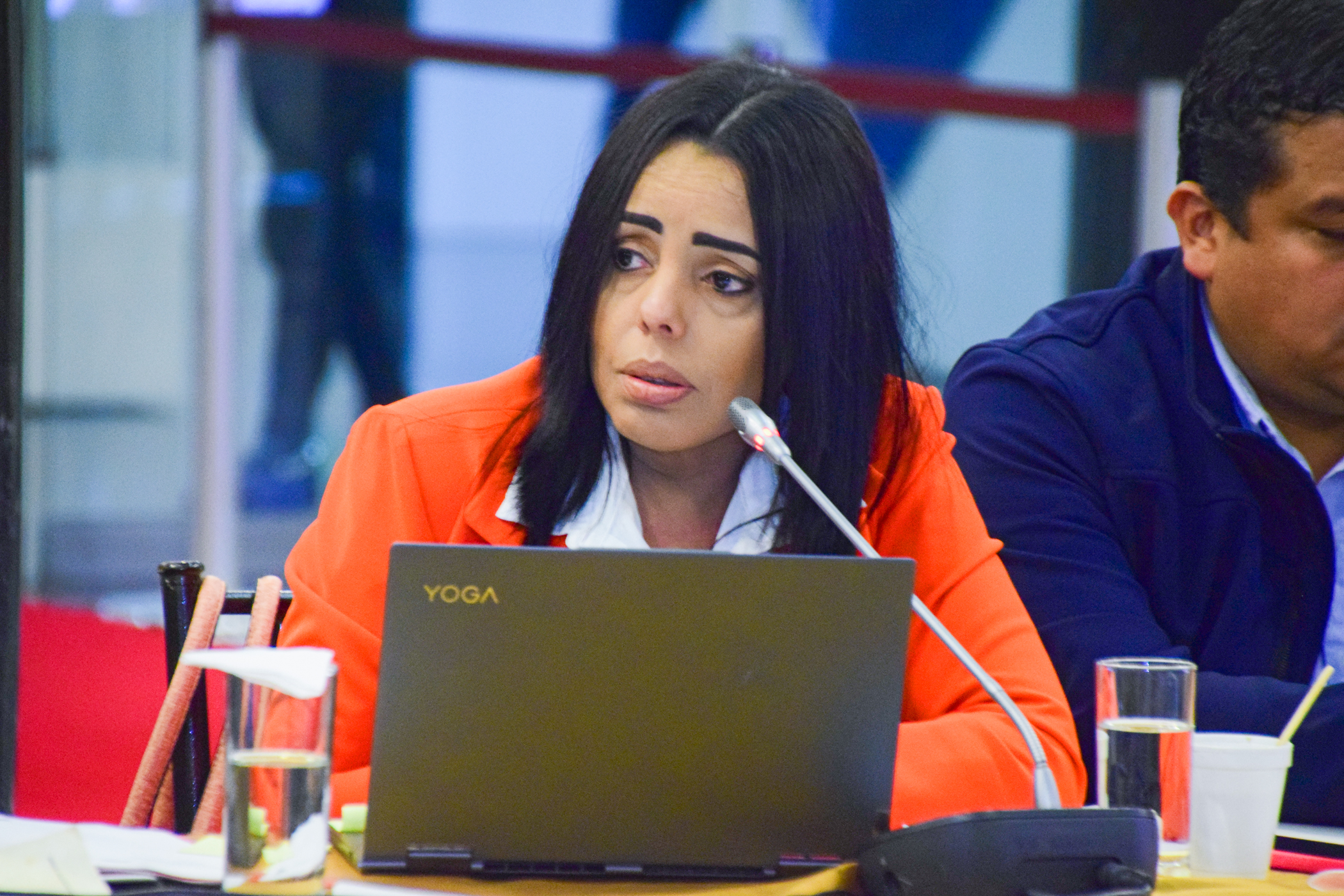
- Occupation: politician
- Known for: elected to Ecuador's 4th National Assembly
- Political party: Union for Hope coalition

María Fernanda Astudillo Barrezueta is an Ecuadorian politician. She was elected to the National Assembly in 2021, but she failed to be re-elected in 2023.

== Life ==
Astudillo was elected to the National Assembly in 2021. She is the representative of El Oro Province and a member of the Union for Hope coalition.

In November 2021 she was one of the 81 politicians who abstained which allowed the Economic Development and Fiscal Sustainability Law to be passed. Other abstainers included Paola Cabezas, Jessica Castillo, Soledad Diab, Ana Herrera, Gissella Molina and Patricia Sánchez.

She has been accused of encouraging payments to Asotex Orense. The accusation was made by Eitel Zambrano of the National Agreement Bank BAN. The case was investigated by the National Assembly's Ethics Committee. Astudillo was the third member to appear in front on the committee. Bella Jimenez had lost her seat within months of gaining it.

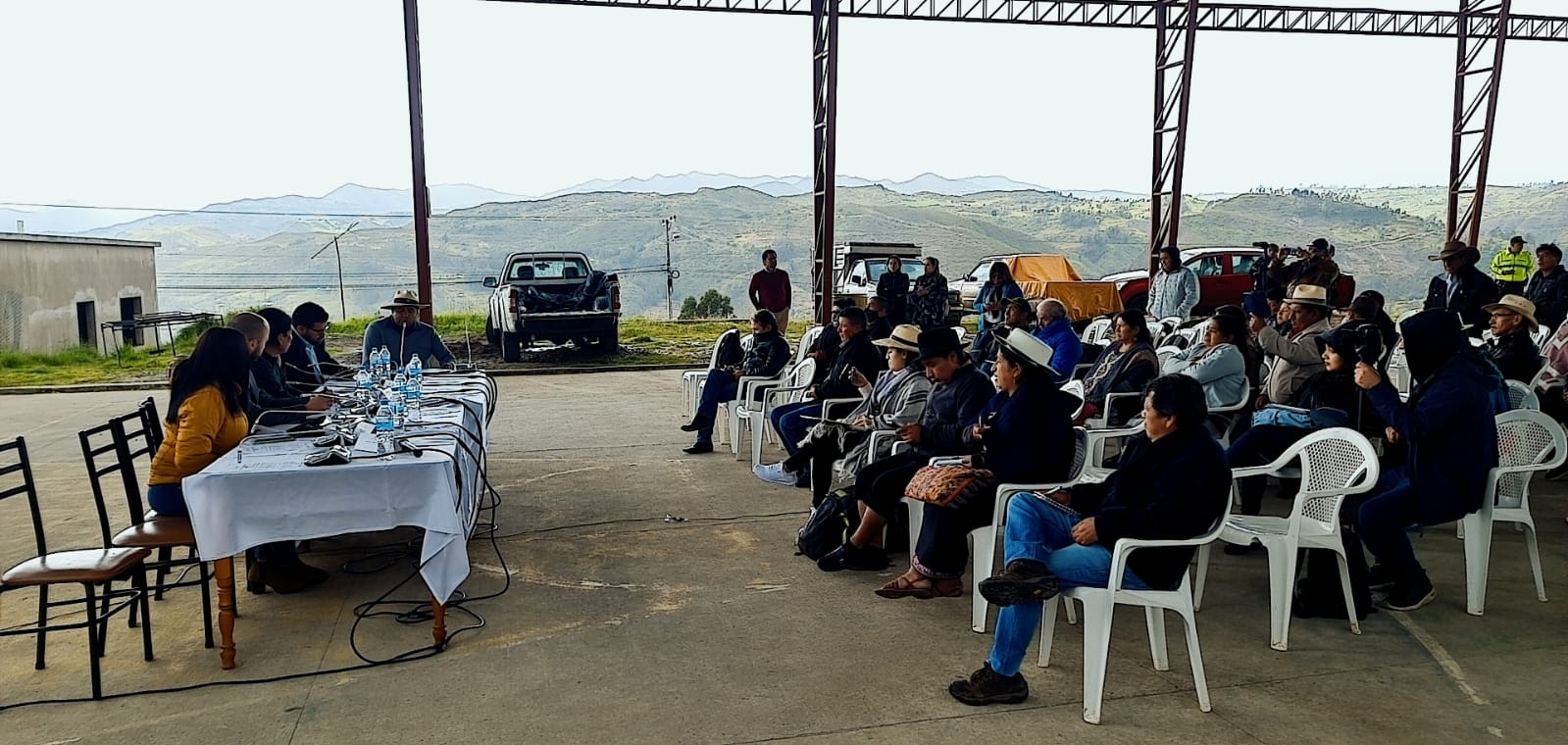
Astudillo (left) at a meeting of the Commission on Constitutional Guarantees (etc) in June 2022

The National Assembly's Ethics Committee's report about Astudillo was scheduled to be presented at the assembly on May 17, but the session was suspended by Guadalupe Llori. Astudillo was a member of the Commission on Constitutional Guarantees, Human Rights, Collective Rights and Interculturality in June 2022 with Guadalupe Llori, Sofia Sanchez, Joseph Cabascango and Victoria Desintonio.

The President of Ecuador Guillermo Lasso brought in the constitution clause number 148 known as Mutual death in May 2023 when he knew that he was about to be impeached. This required all of the National Assembly members to stand for re-election. Astudillo and 67 others stood for re-election and she was not one of the 43 re-elected later that year.
