= Viteri =

Viteri is a Basque surname. Notable people with the surname include:

- Alicia Viteri (born 1946), Panamanian artist
- Cynthia Viteri (born 1965), Ecuadorian politician and journalist
- Daniel Viteri (born 1981), Ecuadorian footballer
- Eugenia Viteri (1928–2023), Ecuadorian author
- Efraín Andrade Viteri (1920–1997), Ecuadorian artist
- María Elsa Viteri (1965–2021), Ecuadorian politician
- Mariela Viteri (born 1968), Ecuadorian television presenter
- Nathalie Viteri (born 1974), Ecuadorian politician
- Oswaldo Viteri (1931–2023), Ecuadorian artist
- Pedro Viteri (1833–1908), Spanish philanthropist
- Rafael Viteri (1952–2025), Spanish footballer
