= Soledad Diab =

Ecuadorian model and politician (born 1973)

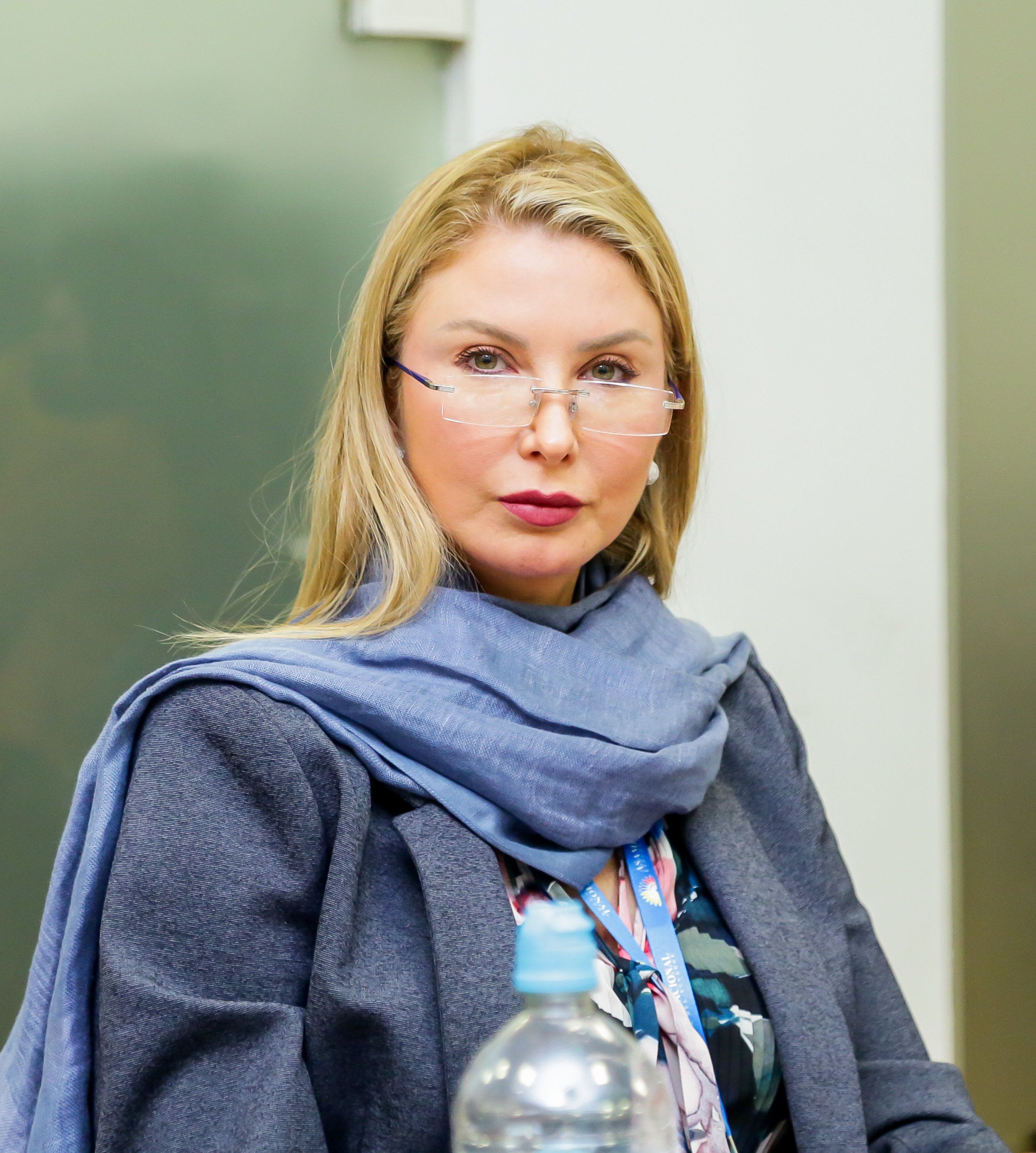

Member of the National Assembly of Ecuador
- Incumbent
- Assumed office May 14, 2021
- Constituency: Guayas District 3

Member of the National Congress of Ecuador
- In office January 5, 2007 – November 29, 2007
- Constituency: Guayas

Personal details
- Born: María Soledad Diab Aguilar; April 4, 1973 (age 53) Guayaquil, Ecuador
- Party: Social Christian
- Spouse: Richard Bohrer Pons (m. 1993)
- Children: 3
- Occupation: Model, presenter, politician
- Awards: Miss Ecuador 1992

María Soledad Diab Aguilar (born April 4, 1973) is an Ecuadorian politician, model, television presenter and beauty pageant titleholder. she is part of the Social Christian Party (PSC).

She served as a deputy of the National Congress in 2007, and has been a member of the National Assembly since May 14, 2021.

She was named Miss Ecuador 1992 and named Miss Photogenic at Miss Universe 1992 in Bangkok, Thailand.

== Early life and education ==
Soledad Diab was born in Guayaquil on April 4, 1973. She studied at the María Auxiliadora school in Guayaquil.

She married Richard Bohrer Pons in 1993, and they have three daughters.

== Modeling and television ==
Diab joined Gamavisión to be a news anchor, but left after winning the Miss Ecuador 1992 pageant. She went on to compete at Miss Universe 1992 held in Bangkok, Thailand, where she was named Miss Photogenic.

Later, she joined Ecuavisa, where she was the host of the magazine Complicidades, and created the "People" segment on the Televistazo newscast.

== Political career ==
In 1997, Diab was appointed Undersecretary of Tourism. She served as a provincial councilor of Guayas, and in 2007 she was a PSC candidate for the National Congress. She won a seat, but later that year, she was one of 57 deputies dismissed by the Supreme Electoral Tribunal due to the country's legislative crisis.

Before the 2021 general election, Diab presented her candidacy for the National Assembly for the same party. She won a seat, representing Guayas District 3.

In November 2021, she was one of the 81 politicians who abstained from voting which allowed the Economic Development and Fiscal Sustainability Law to be passed. Other abstainers included Jessica Castillo, Ana Herrera, Gissella Molina, Patricia Sánchez and Nathalie Viteri.

In September 2022, she resigned from position in the assembly for the Social Christian Party as she plans to stand to be a councilor in Guayaquil in the 2023 elections. This resignation is required by Ecuadorian law.
