= 1946 in Panama =

- Decades: 1920s; 1930s; 1940s; 1950s; 1960s
- See also: Other events of 1946; Timeline of Panamanian history

The following lists events in the year 1946 in Panama.

== Incumbents ==
- President: Enrique Adolfo Jiménez
- Vice president: Ernesto de la Guardia

== Births ==
- Alicia Viteri, artist
- 18 February – Camilo Azuquita, singer
- 10 March – Darío Fernández Jaen, politician and broadcaster (died 2011)
- 29 June – Ernesto Pérez Balladares, former president
- 1 July – Mireya Moscoso, former president
- 15 August – Donaldo Arza, runner
- 26 September – Mitchell Doens, economist, Minister of Labour (died 2026)
- 29 September – Arturo Lindsay, artist
- 28 December – Jorge Velásquez, jockey
- 29 December – Laffit Pincay Jr., jockey

== Deaths ==
- Ezequiel Fernández, politician and former acting president
