= Mass media in Panama =

Panama has been an important mass media hub, because of its strategic location between North and South America. The largest newspapers in Panama are La Prensa, La Estrella, Panama America, Critica, and El Siglo, all of which are published in Panama City. Weekly newspapers include the Critica Libre and La Cronica. All of these are published in Spanish, and are also based in Panama City.

The media of Panama has been highly influenced by that of the United States, since the construction of the Panama Canal. Radio broadcasting in Panama began in 1922, and television broadcasting in 1956. Radio and television broadcasts also reached the Panama Canal Zone because it lay within the vicinity of Panama. A famous military broadcast network, the Southern Command Network (SCN), broadcast in Panama until the United States withdrew from the canal in 1999. The SCN remained on the air for hours during the invasion of Panama by U.S. troops in 1989. Color television in Panama is provided by the NTSC system.

The media was under strict control during the regime of the dictators that ruled Panama from 1968 to 1989, including Manuel Noriega. His regime was noted for the eventual demise of all opposition media while existing media outlets were consistently fed with anti-American propaganda. The newsletter La Prensa was formed in 1981 to oppose his rule. The media of Panama was very anti-American following Noriega's overthrow, and highly influenced the 1994 presidential election.

Panama's official broadcaster is National Television of Panama, which was founded in 1961. NTP started Panama's first color television service in 1972.

Freedom of the press is guaranteed in Panama, as is the case in most other countries in the Western Hemisphere. However, reports of harassment and violence against journalists and media outlets persist. During media coverage, journalists have reported instances of being attacked by both protesters and the police. There are also cases of killings. An example was the assassination of Darío Fernández Jaen, who was a government critic and had exposed anomalies in the allocation of land titles in the province of Coclé.

== See also ==
- List of radio stations in Panama
- List of radio stations in Panama City
- List of newspapers in Panama
- List of television stations in Panama
