= Sofía Sánchez (politician) =

Politician from Ecuador

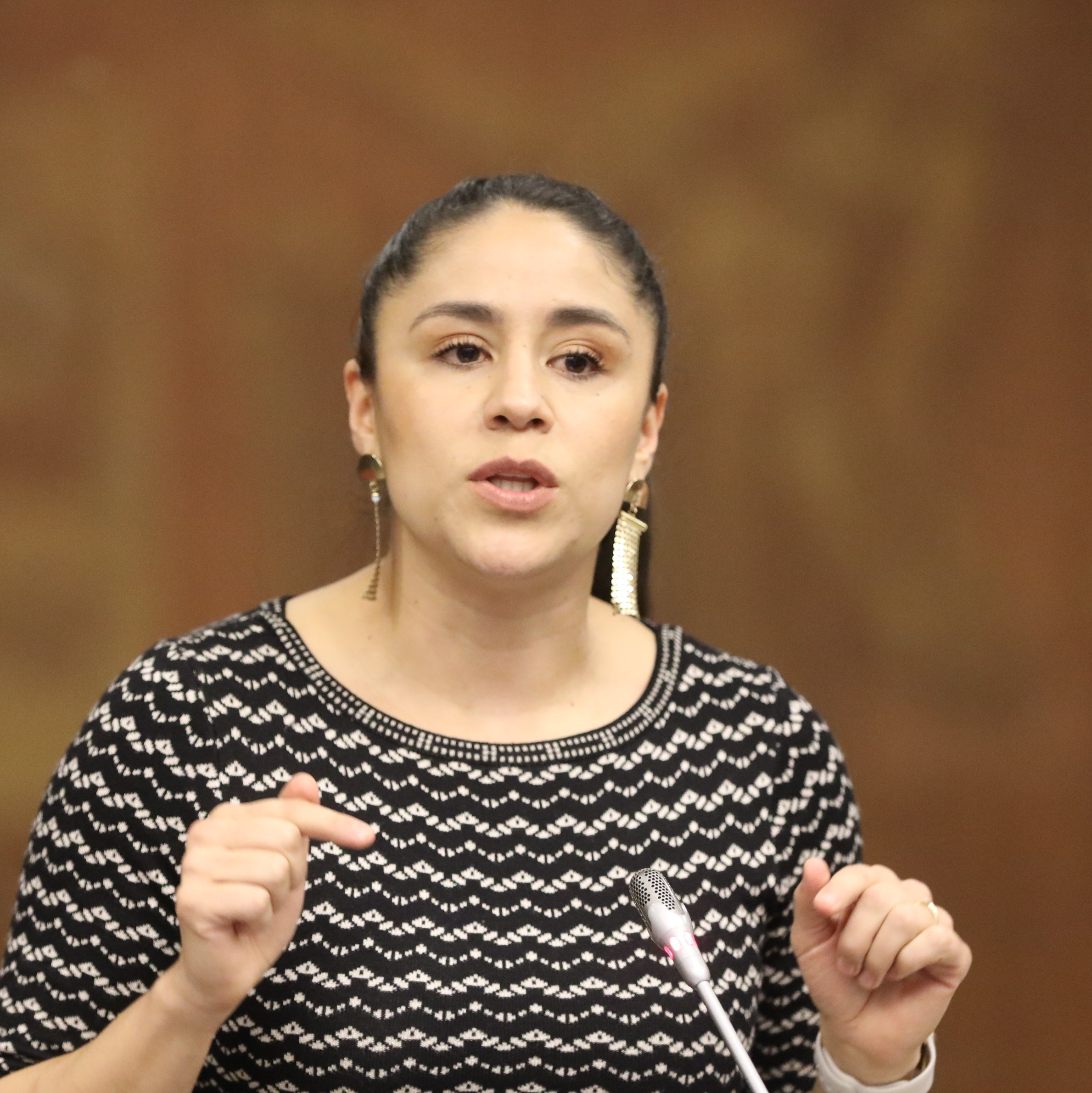
- in 2022

Member of the National Assembly
- Incumbent
- Assumed office 14 May 2021
- Constituency: Azuay

Personal details
- Born: Sandra Sofía Sánchez Urgilés; 7 March 1989 (age 37) Cuenca, Ecuador
- Party: Pachakutik Plurinational Unity Movement – New Country then, Movimiento Construye
- Education: University of Cuenca; Autonomous University of Barcelona
- Occupation: Footballer; Lawyer

Sandra Sofía Sánchez Urgilés (born 7 March 1989) is an Ecuadorian footballer and politician. In 2021 she was elected to the National Assembly of Ecuador for the Pachakutik Plurinational Unity Movement – New Country party. She was re-elected in 2023 for the Construye party

== Life ==
Sánchez was born in 1989. Her parents were lawyer Washington Sánchez, and teacher Sandra Urgilés. At the age of thirteen, she took an interest in football. By 2013 she began playing football for the Carneras UPS football team. She says that football was her main interest because her two brothers played that game. She had success in other sports which included running 100, 200 and 400-metre races for Azuay Province. At basketball and rugby she played games at a national level as a child. She played basketball in Buenos Aires and in Machala and she played rugby with the national team in 2013. That team went to Trujillo in Peru to play in the Bolivarian Games. Football was most important to her, but her mother advised her to prioritise her studies at the University of Cuenca; her mother thought that soccer would not provide a stable income. She later remarked that she was grateful for that advice; she later became a lawyer.

In 2015, Sánchez went to Spain for her studies for her master's degree at the Autonomous University of Barcelona; she continued to play football there for the CE Sabadell FC team. When she returned to Ecuador she returned to the Carneras UPS team where she played during 2020 in the Ecuador's Superliga Femenina.

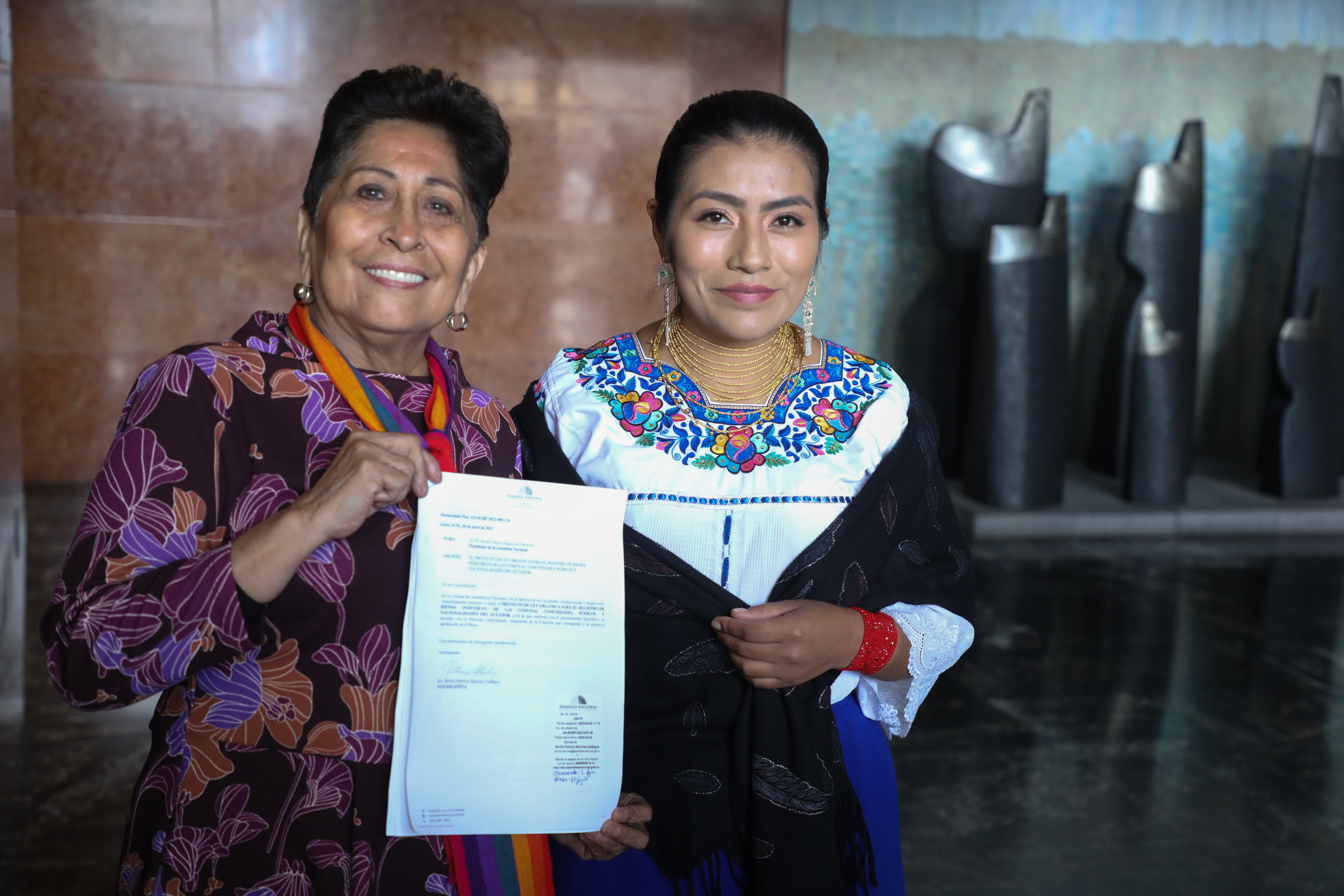
Patricia Sánchez and Sofia Sánchez with a parliamentary Bill in 2023

Sánchez learned that she was elected to the National Assembly of Ecuador for Azuay on 7 February 2021. She was one of the five representatives for Azuay. She was a member of the Pachakutik Plurinational Unity Movement – New Country.

Sánchez serves on the Commission on Constitutional Guarantees, Human Rights, Collective Rights, and Interculturality. The commission is chaired by Joseph Cabascango as President and Victoria Desintonio as vice-President. Sánchez was involved in the Commission's report into the Pandora Papers which revealed details of President Lasso's finances. She was concerned that the report that was presented to the Assembly's plenary had been changed just before a vote of approval in committee. She abstained from the vote in November 2021 and Johanna Moreira supported her concern. The report was approved nevertheless.

In the same month, Sánchez was one of the 81 politicians who abstained, allowing the Economic Development and Fiscal Sustainability Law to be passed. Other abstainers included María Fernanda Astudillo, Jessica Castillo, Soledad Diab, Ana Herrera, Gissella Molina, and Patricia Sánchez.

The President of Ecuador Guillermo Lasso brought in the constitution clause number 148 known as Mutual death in May 2023 when he knew that he was about to be impeached. This required all of the National Assembly members to stand for re-election. She and 67 others stood for re-election and she was one of the 43 re-elected. This time for the Construye party.
