= Nathalie Viteri =

Ecuadorian lawyer

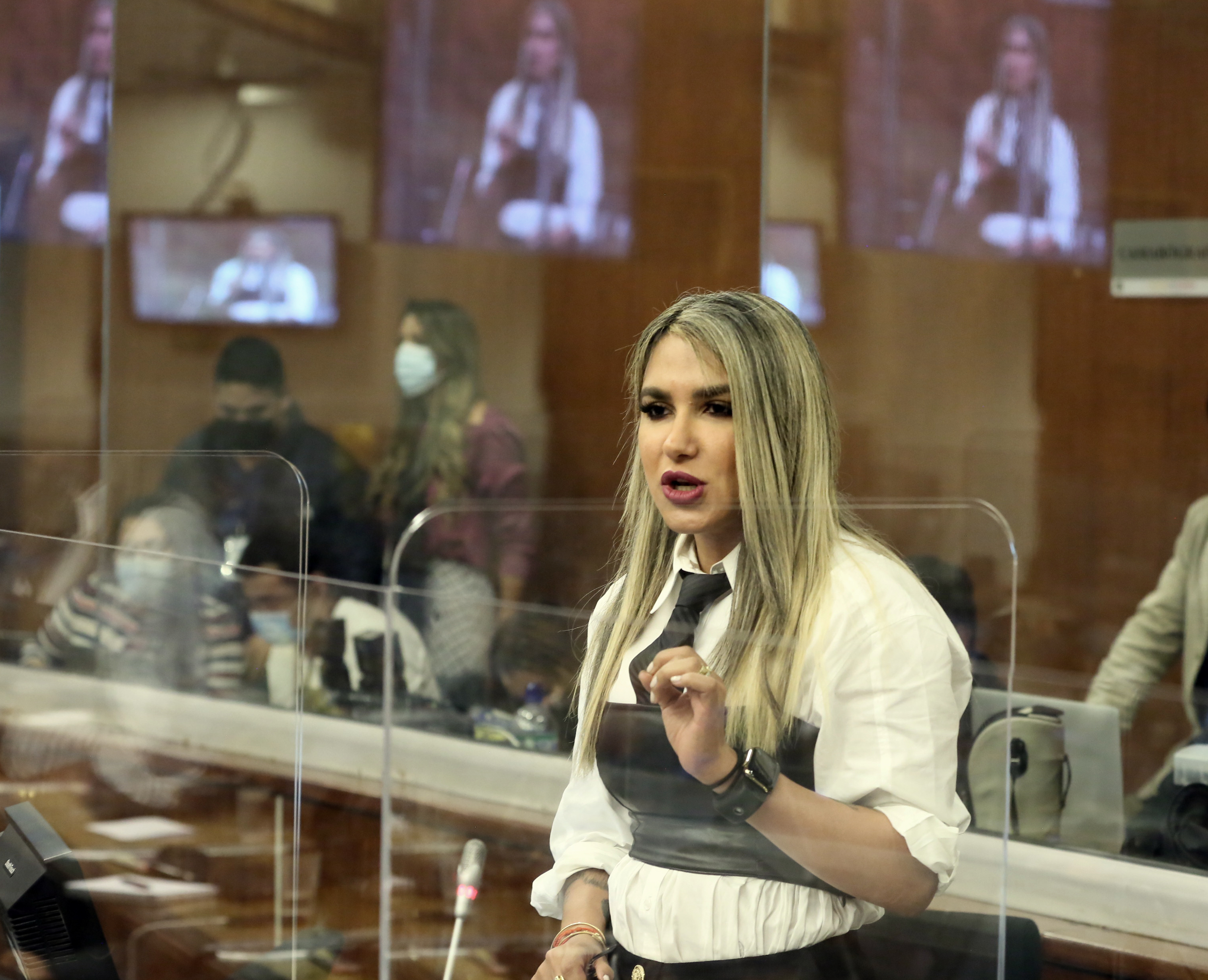
- Viteri at the National Assembly

Member of the National Congress
- In office 5 January 2007 – March 2007
- Constituency: Guayas

Member of the National Assembly
- Incumbent
- Assumed office 14 May 2021

Personal details
- Born: 6 October 1974 (age 51) Guayaquil, Ecuador
- Party: Social Christian Party
- Spouse: Oscar Crow
- Children: 2
- Parent(s): José Viteri Peña and Leonor Jiménez Campuzano
- Relatives: Cynthia Viteri (elder sister)
- Education: Instituto Tecnológico Universitario Espíritu Santo; Universidad Católica de Santiago de Guayaquil; Universidad Particular de Loja

Nathalie María Viteri Jimenez (born 6 October 1974) is a lawyer and an Ecuadorian Assemblyperson. In 2021 she joined the fourth legislative period of the National Assembly. She unsuccessfully stood for re-election to the National Assembly in 2023.

== Life ==
Viteri was born on 6 October 1974. Her parents are José Viteri Peña and Leonor Jiménez Campuzano, and her elder sister is Cynthia Viteri.

She worked in the mayor's office, and she served as an alternate councilor for Doménica Tabacchi, who became the vice mayor of Guayaquil.

In March 2007, the Supreme Electoral Court dismissed 57 deputies from the National Assembly. Viteri was one of these politicians. The deputies appealed against the decision twice, and they were successful. However, their places were no longer available. The Inter-American Commission on Human Rights granted over 50 of them compensation; as of May 2021, the money had not been paid.

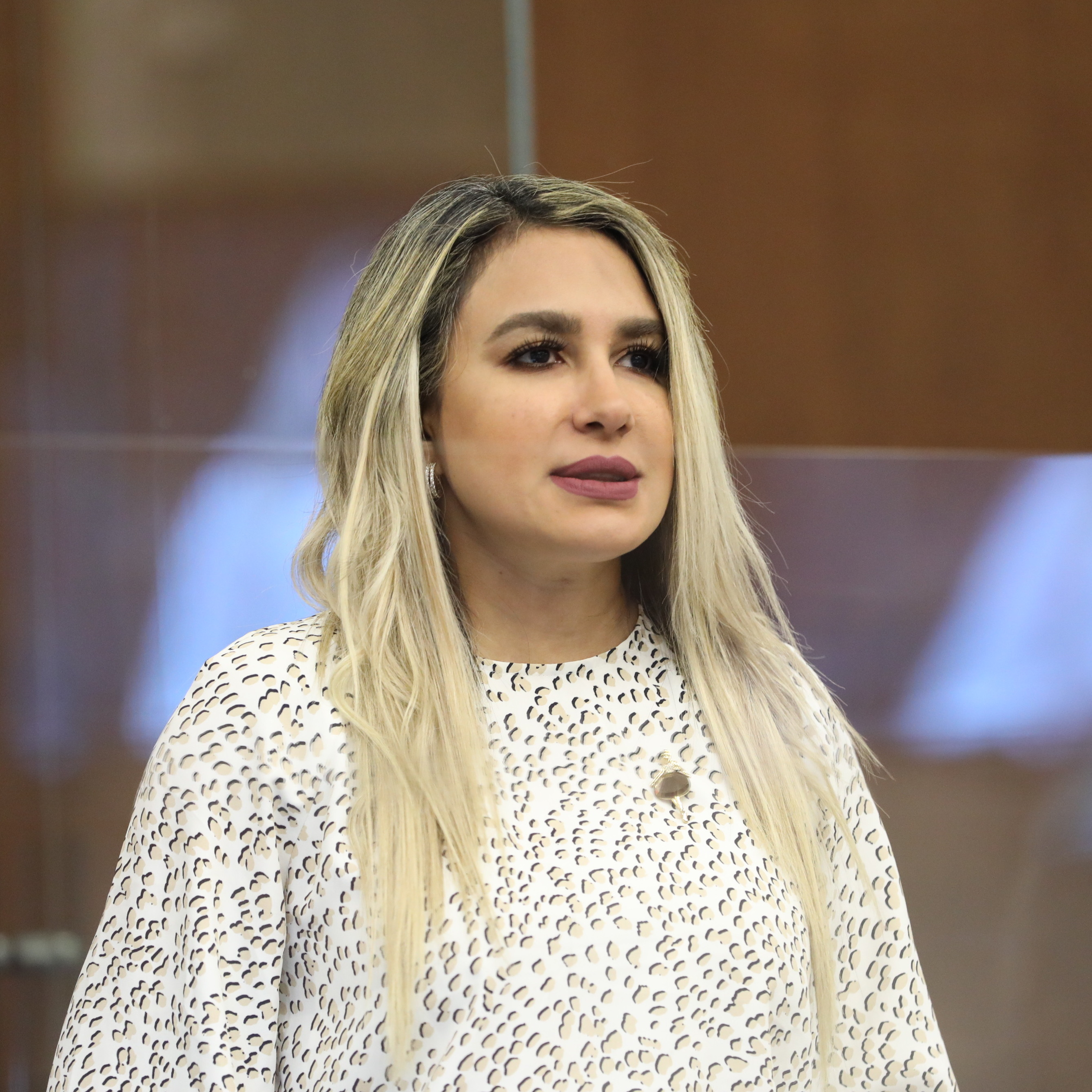
Viteri in 2022

However, Viteri was again elected to the National Assembly in 2021. Viteri is from Guayaquil where her sister, Cynthia Viteri, is the mayor.

In November 2021, she was one of the 81 politicians who abstained from voting, which allowed the Economic Development and Fiscal Sustainability Law to be passed. Other abstainers included Jessica Castillo, Rosa Cerda, Ana Herrera, Gissella Molina and Patricia Sánchez.

In 2022, during a debate, she spoke of sodium chloride being used to cause an abortion. This does not happen according to the World Health Organisation. Viteri makes a high number of interventions in the assembly. On average, members of the assembly made about ten interventions each during the first ten months of the new session's plenaries. However, Viteri made over 40, putting her in the top five for interventions up to March 2022.

In March 2023, she said that she was ill and in pain. She had found out that she suffered from fibromyalgia. The disease has a genetic part but she believes it was brought on by COVID-19. She went to America to see several doctors before getting a diagnosis. She has proposed a change in the law to support those who have rare diseases.

She unsuccessfully stood for re-election to the National Assembly in 2023. The President of Ecuador Guillermo Lasso brought in constitution clause number 148 known as Mutual death in May 2023 when he knew that he was about to be impeached. This required all of the National Assembly members to stand for re-election. Viteri and 67 others stood for re-election but she was not one of the 43 re-elected later that year.

== Private life ==
Viteri is married to Oscar Crow; they have two children.
