= List of radio stations in Panama =

This is an alphabetical list of radio stations in Panama.

== Radio station ==
Name	Frequency	Website
Antena 8	100.1 FM	https://www.antena8.com/
Estéreo Azul	100.9 FM	https://www.estereoazul.com/
Cool FM	89.3 FM	https://www.coolfmpanama.com/
Quiubo Estéreo	103.3 FM, 101.3 FM and 106.7 FM	https://www.quiuboestereo.com/
La Mega Panama S.A.	98.1 FM	
Que Buena	88.7 FM	
Radio Hit S.A.	105.3 FM	–
Los 40	91.3 FM (Panama City)	–
Activa	104.9 FM	
Blast	102.9 FM	
CPR	101.1 FM	
Fabulosa	100.5 FM	
Radio Ancón	92.1 FM, 92.3 FM, 102.7 FM and 100.3 FM	https://www.radioancon.com/
Tropi Q	99.7 FM	
KW Continente	710 AM (Dark) and 95.9 FM	
Marbella	104.3 FM	
Omega Stereo	107.3 FM	
Super Q	90.5 FM	–
WAO	97.3 and 97.5 FM	
BalboaRadio	Web only	
Radio Mia	650 and 920 AM, 90.3 and 93.7 FM	
Shok Radio	93.3 FM	
Panama En Vivo	Internet only	https://panamaenvivo.com
Play - Sonido de la Calle	103.7 FM	
Radio Libre (Apagada)	870 AM	
RPC Radio	90.9 & 106.3 FM	
Stereo 89	89.9 FM	
Radio Panama (Previously W Radio and Caracol)	94.5 FM	
Radio PTY	Online	[21]

== See also ==
- Media of Panama
- List of radio stations in Panama City
