= Doménica Tabacchi =

Ecuadorian journalist and politician

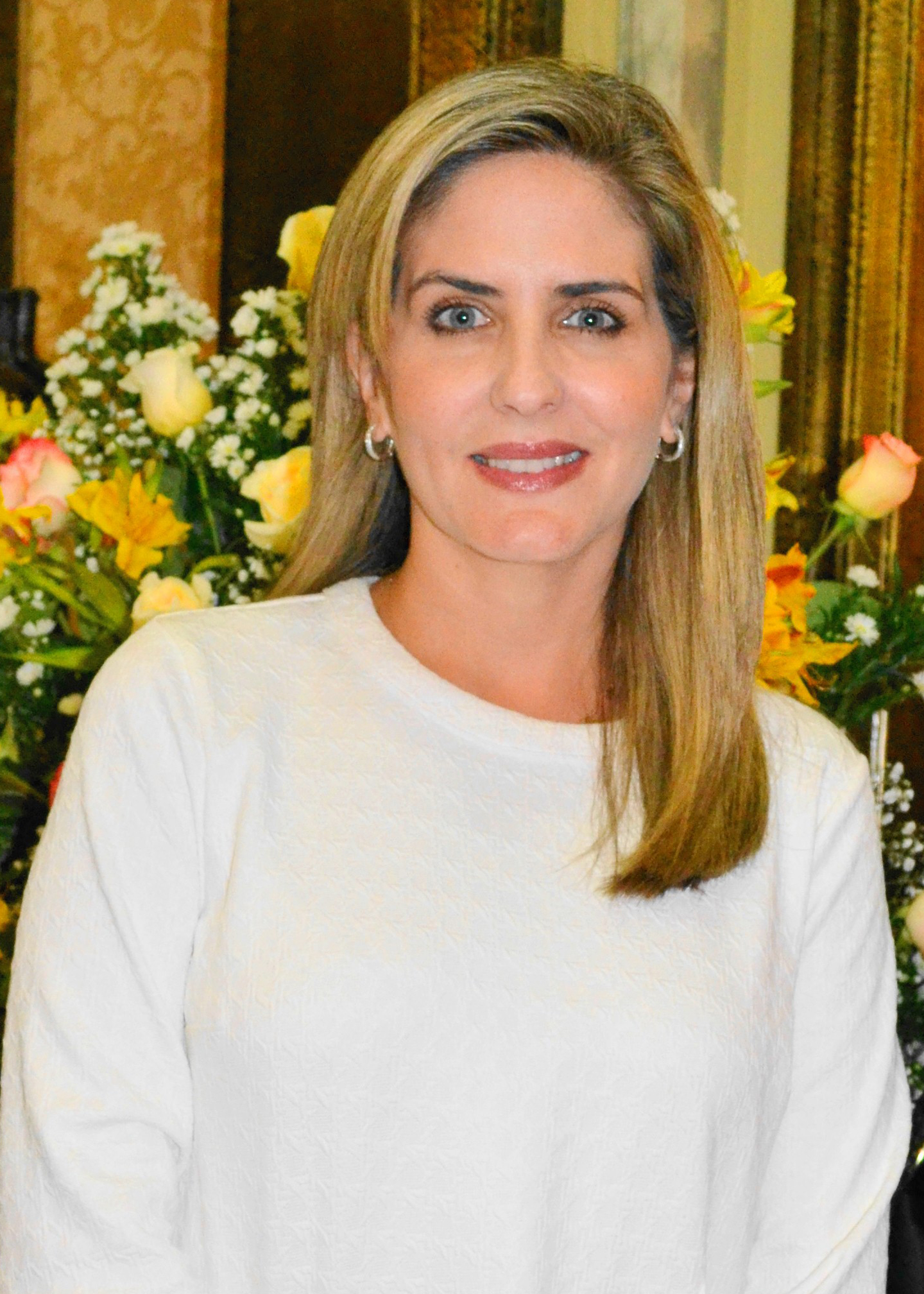
Doménica Cristina Tabacchi Rendón

Doménica Cristina Tabacchi Rendón (born February 21, 1973) is an Ecuadorian journalist and politician. She currently serves as Vice mayor of Guayaquil, which is Ecuador's largest city, being the first woman ever to obtain the charge. Nathalie Viteri, who became a delegate to the National Assembly, worked in the mayor's office. She was Tabacchi's alternate councilor.
