= María Leonor Jiménez =

Ecuadorian politician, lawyer and teacher

María Leonor Jiménez Camposano (March 28, 1939, Samborondón) is an Ecuadorian politician, lawyer and teacher who was the first female mayor of the Guayas police.

== Life ==
She became president of the Provincial Court of Justice of Guayas from 2010 until 2011, when she was dismissed by the Council of the Transitional Judiciary for her criticism of the El Universo case, accusing since that justice was "manipulated" by the executive.

== Private life ==
She had four children who include Nathalie Viteri and Cynthia Viteri who are both elected politicians.
