= List of newspapers in Panama =

Newspapers in Panama include:

- Crítica - website
- Día a Día - website
- Tyn Pánama - website
- El Panameño
- La Estrella de Panamá
- Mi Diario
- Panamá América - website
- La Prensa
- El Siglo

== See also ==
- Media of Panama
