= Dina Farinango =

Ecuadorian politician

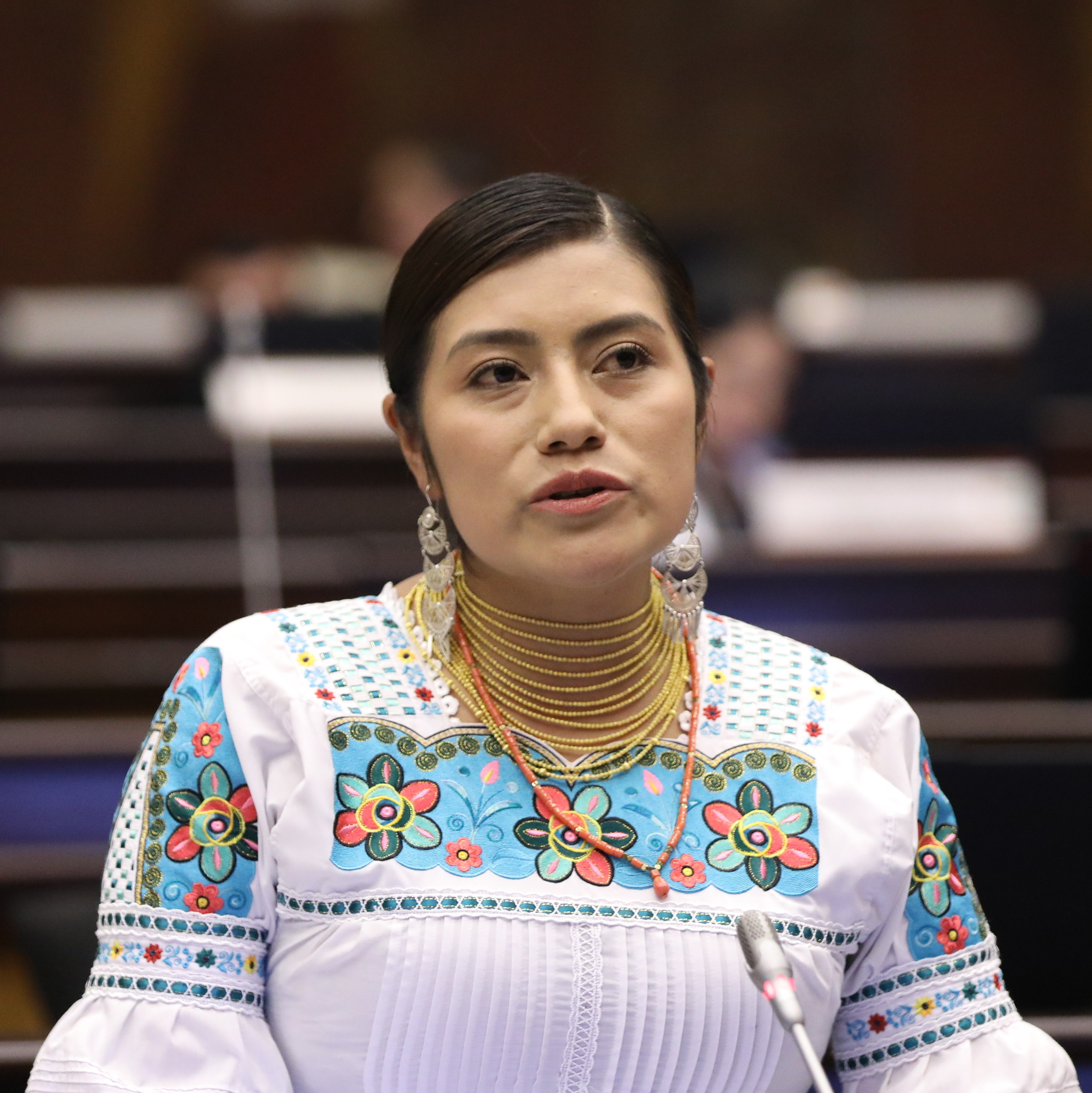
- in August 2025
- Born: Dina Maribel Farinango Quilumbaquin; 19 March 1993 (age 33); Cangahua in Cayambe Canton
- Education: Central University of Ecuador
- Occupations: lawyer, politician
- Known for: member of the National Assembly of Ecuador
- Political party: Pachakutik Plurinational Unity Movement – New Country

Dina Maribel Farinango Quilumbaquin (born 19 March 1993) is an Ecuadorian member of the National Assembly of Ecuador. She is a member of the Pachakutik Plurinational Unity Movement – New Country party and she represents Pichincha Province 4.

== Life ==
Farinango was born in Cangahua, Cayambe, on 19 March 1993. She joined politics when she was thirteen. She went to the Central University of Ecuador and studied law.

She was elected as a member of the National Assembly of Ecuador. Farinango is one of three elected to the National Assembly of Ecuador to represent the Pichincha Province. The others are Jose Fernando Cabascango Collaguazo and Jessica Carolina Castillo Cardenas. They are all members of the Pachakutik Plurinational Unity Movement – New Country party. She sits in the assembly in seat number 36.

In November 2021, she was one of the 81 politicians who abstained which allowed the Economic Development and Fiscal Sustainability Law to be passed. Other abstainers included Jessica Castillo, Patricia Sánchez and Ana Herrera.

In April 2022, she spoke out against the assembly's President Guadalupe Llori because she had prematurely closed a debate when Alejandro Jaramillo was trying to table an amendment to the law concerning abortions in the case where the pregnancy was as a result of rape. Farinango argued that the debate should have continued and Llori was settling matters by decree.

In June 2025 she proposed changes to the law that strengthened the legal protection to women at work when they are pregnant or breastfeeding.
