= Aquiles Alvarez =

Ecuadorian politician (born 1984)

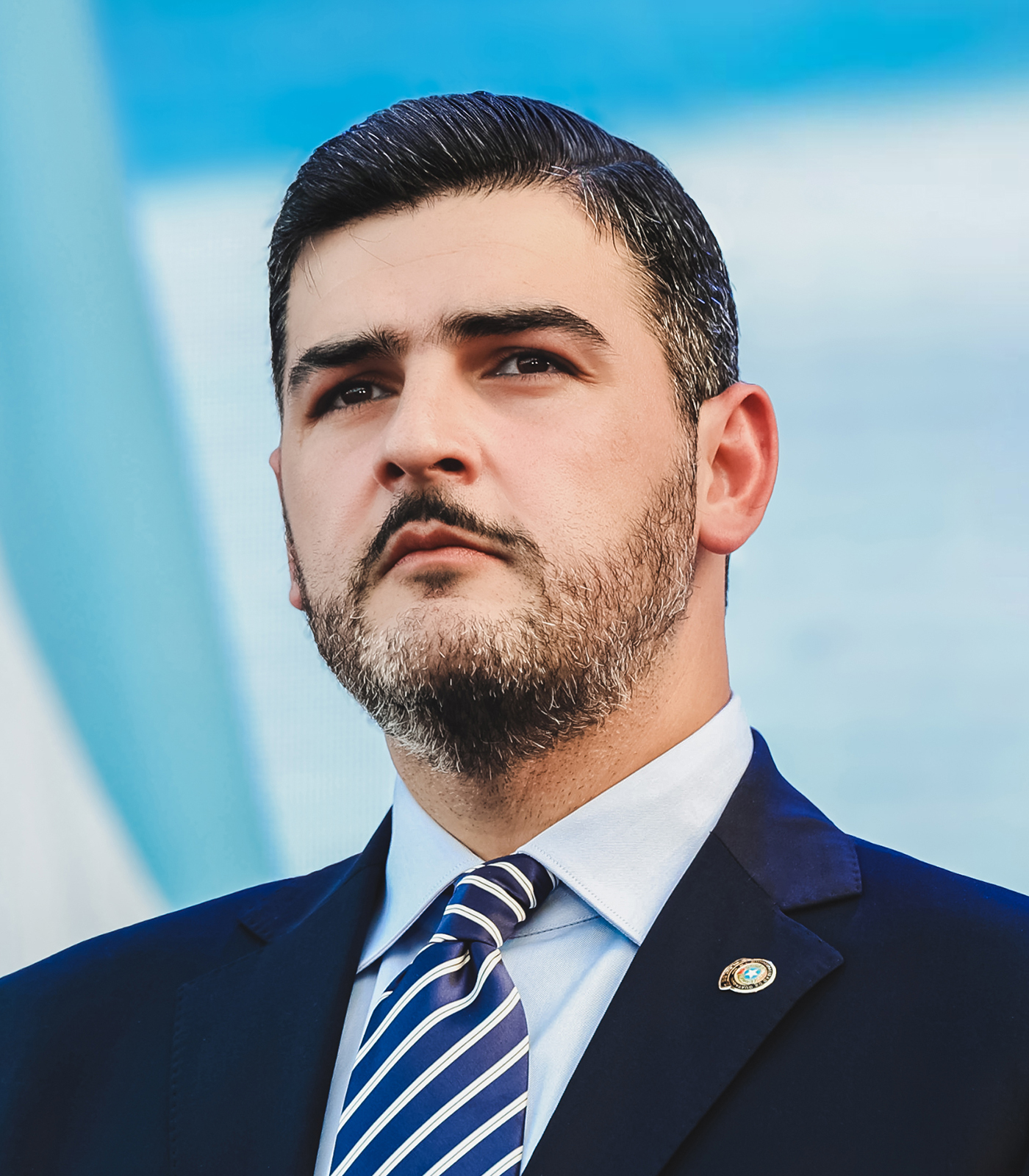
Alvarez in 2025

Aquiles David Alvarez Henriques (born in Guayaquil on April 12, 1984) is an Ecuadorian politician who has served as mayor of Guayaquil since 2023.

== Life ==
Alvarez lived with his siblings in the United States, but after his father's death in 2004, he returned to Ecuador. He worked as a pizza delivery driver in New York. He studied political science at Casa Grande University but did not complete his studies. He decided to join the family business in the hydrocarbons sector. With that experience, Álvarez manages several companies, some of which are related to fuel marketing. He was also president of Barcelona Sporting Club, one of the most iconic soccer teams in Equador.

He was elected mayor of Guayaquil in 2023 as the candidate of the left-wing Citizen Revolution Movement. He succeeded Cynthia Viteri. His victory ended 30 years of administration by the right-wing Christian Social Party. His main proposal is to restructure the city's districts to decentralize the municipality. His goal is to create “15-minute cities”, urban centers that connect people with municipal services and spaces for art, culture, and medical brigades. Another of its main objectives is to reduce crime.

He is married and has three children.

On February 10 2026, Alvarez was arrested in a coordinated operation by Ecuador’s Fiscalía General del Estado (Attorney General’s Office) and the Policía Nacional.

The arrest took place in Guayas province, where Guayaquil is located, and Álvarez was subsequently transferred to Quito for legal proceedings.

He is accused in what prosecutors call “Caso Goleada”, a criminal investigation alleging delincuencia organizada (organized crime) with alleged money laundering and tax evasion/defraudación tributaria.
