= La Estrella de Panamá =

Newspaper in Panamá

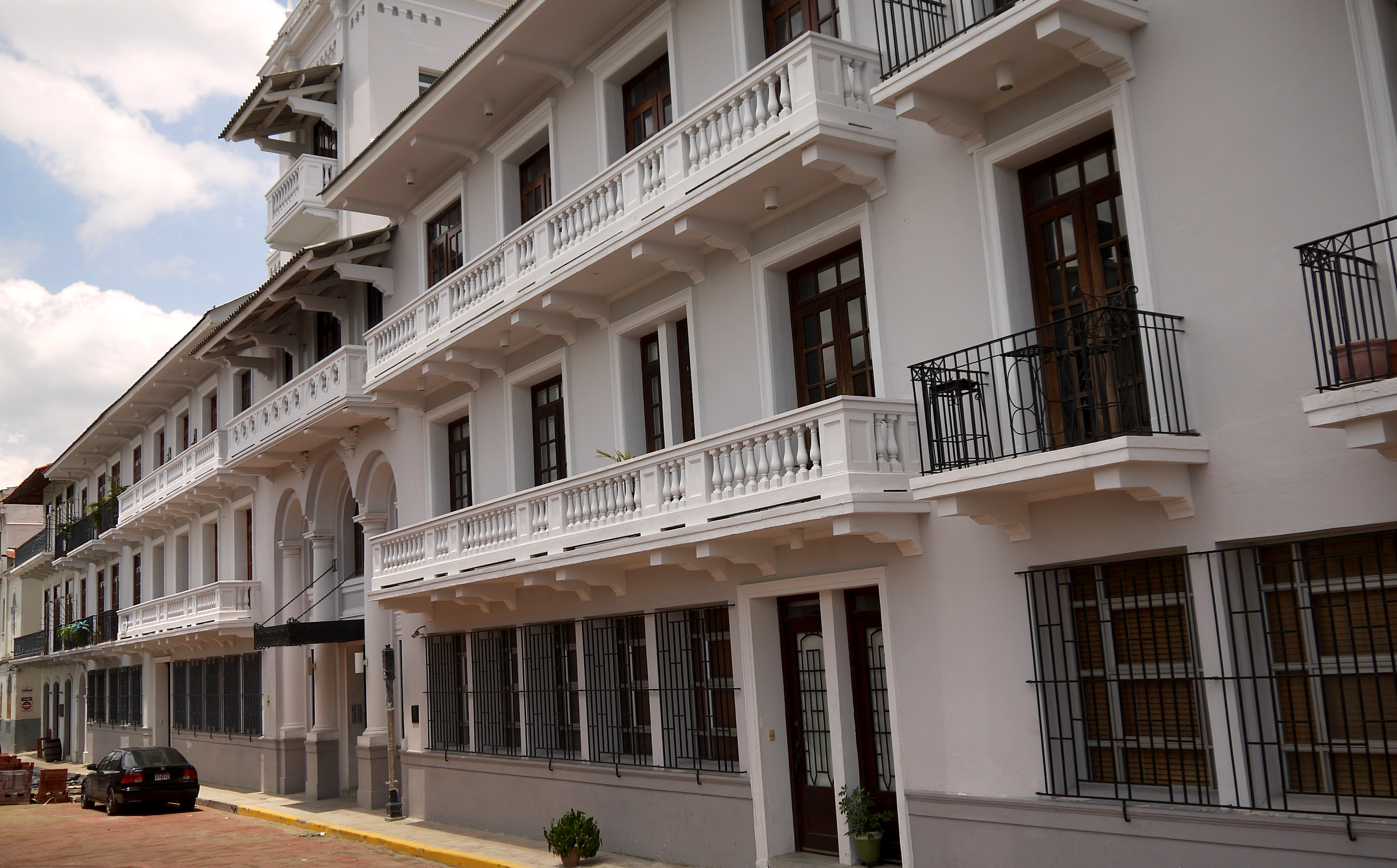
- Type: Daily newspaper
- Founded: 1849; 176 years ago
- Language: Spanish
- Country: Panama
- Website: laestrella.com.pa

La Estrella de Panamá is the oldest daily newspaper in Panama.

The newspaper was originally established in 1849 as a Spanish-language translation insert of an English daily, The Panama Star, which also had been founded in 1849. It has a circulation of approximately 8,000 print copies.

== See also ==
- List of newspapers in Panama
