= Rosa Cerda =

Ecuadorian politician

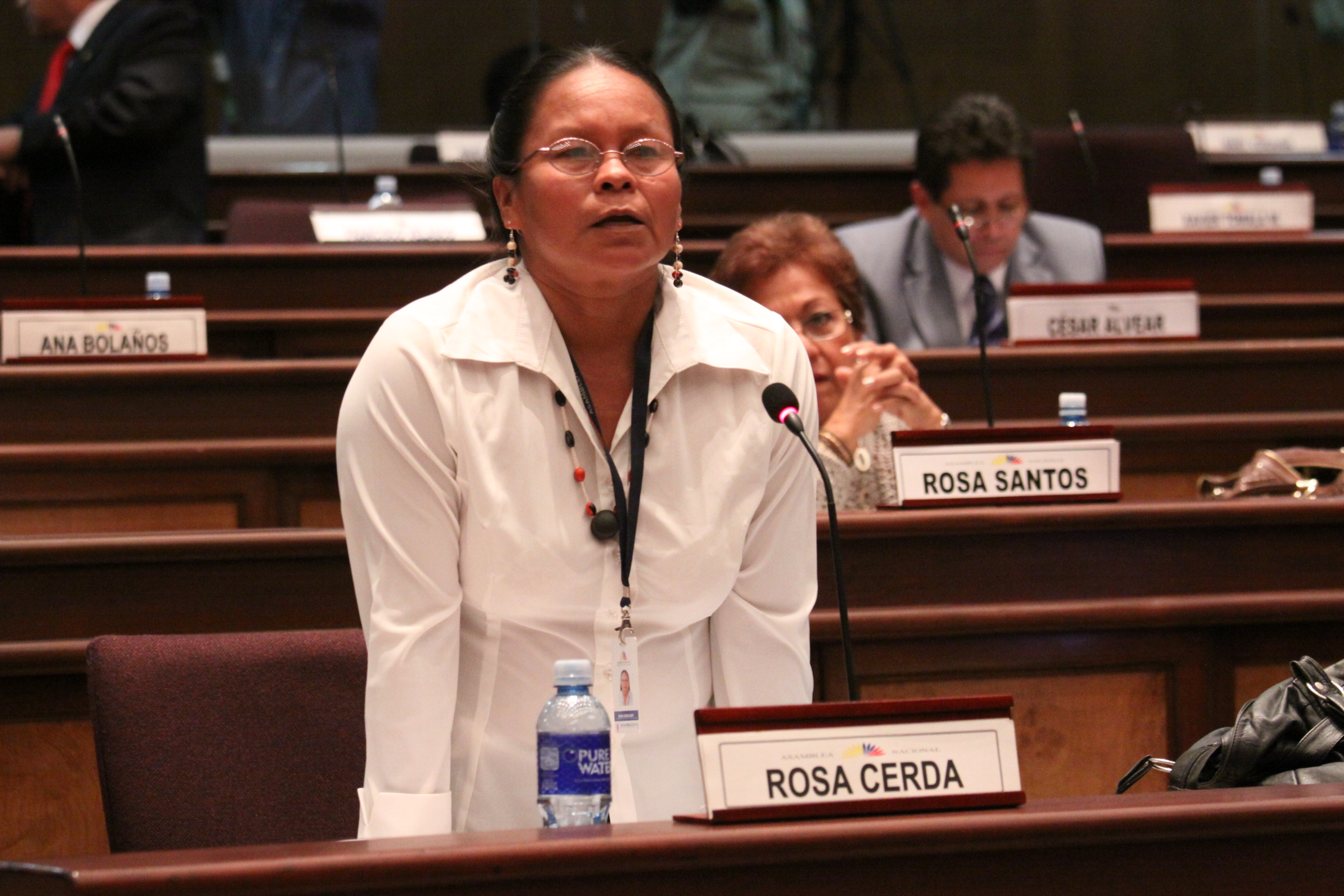
- Cerda in 2010
- Born: Rosa Elizabeth Cerda
- Occupation: politician

Rosa Elizabeth Cerda Cerda is an Ecuadorian politician elected to the National Assembly of Ecuador. She is a member of the Pachakutik Plurinational Unity Movement – New Country party.

== Life ==
In 2002 she graduated from Escuela Superior Politécnica Ecológica Amazónica.

Cerda was elected to the National Assembly of Ecuador as a member of the Pachakutik Plurinational Unity Movement – New Country. She served on the Assembly's Commission on the Right to Health and Sport after she was elected. In July 2021 she created an outcry when she said in a video "If they steal, they steal well". She was suspended for eight days from the assembly and the Pachakutik Napo movement was harsher disowning her for 180days.

In December 2021 her fellow party member, Gissella Molina, was accused by the President, Guillermo Lasso, of taking a bribe to vote against an Investment Law project. Other members mentioned in the accusation included Cerda. Molina denied it and noted that no evidence had been offered to support the accusation.

In April 2022 she left her party and became an independent member of the National Assembly. At the end of the year she presented a new draft law to the assembly. The law covered the rights of indigenous people to use traditional medicines. In the case of pregnant women it would also allow then to choose whether they wanted a traditional approach during labour.

Cerda did not attend a meeting in May 2022 at the prosecutors office in Quito to hear the case brought by Guillermo Lasso. Cerda's lawyer Gonzalo Realpe said that Cerda would not attend and that another of the accused, Édgar Quezada, would also not attend his hearing the following day.
