= Cynthia Viteri =

Ecuadorian lawyer, journalist and politician

Her Grace Cynthia Viteri
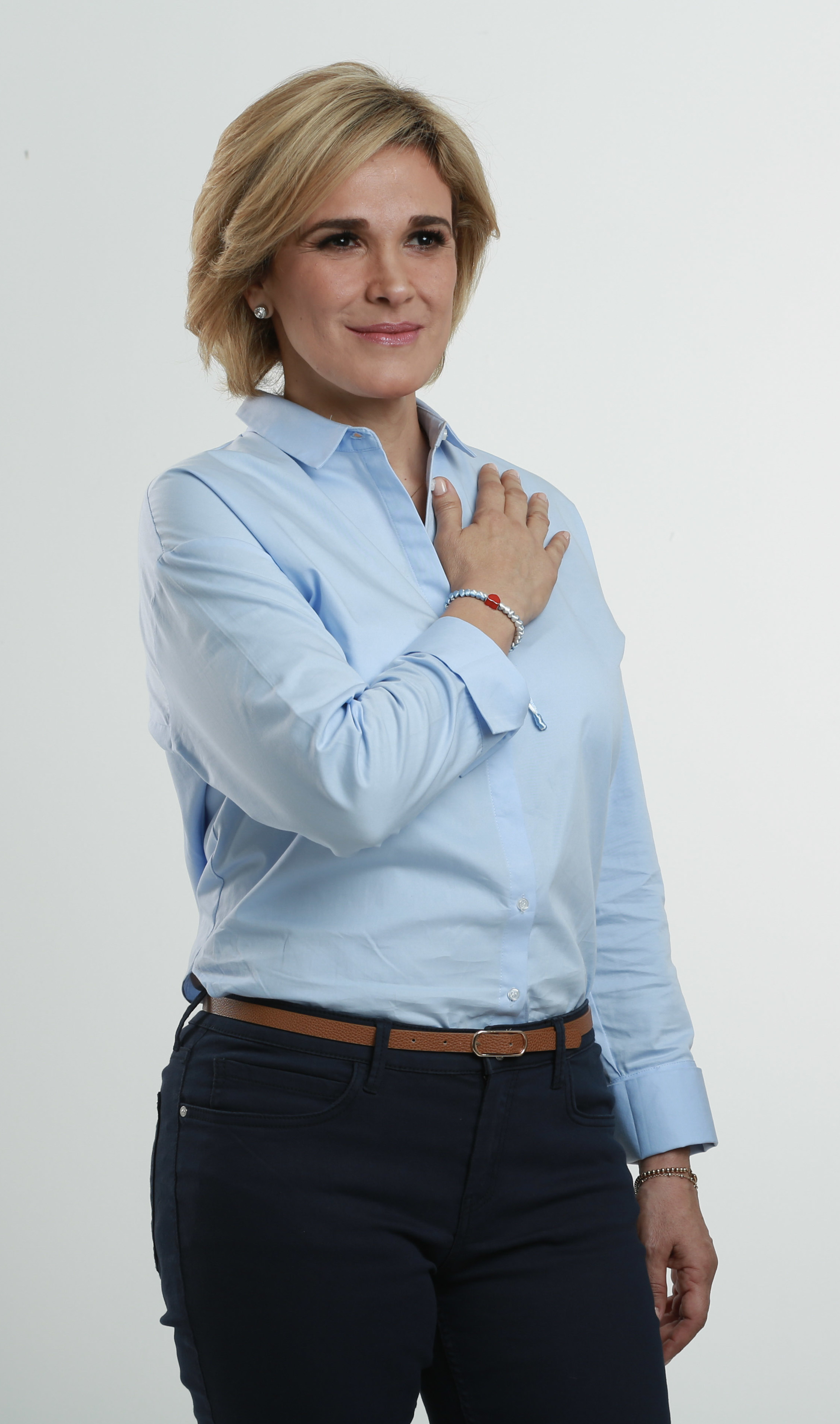

Mayor of Guayaquil
- In office 15 May 2019 – 14 May 2023

Member of the National Assembly for the National Constituency
- In office 14 May 2013 – 6 Nov 2017

Member of the National Assembly for Guayas Province
- In office 31 July 2009 – 13 May 2013

Member of the Constituent Assembly
- In office 29 November 2007 – 25 October 2008

Member of the National Congress
- In office 15 January 2003 – 15 January 2007

First Vice President of the National Congress
- In office 21 April 2005 – 26 April 2006
- President: Wilfrido Lucero

Member of the National Congress for Guayas Province
- In office 11 August 1998 – 15 January 2003

Member of the National Constituent Assembly
- In office 6 February 1997 – 11 August 1998

Personal details
- Born: 19 November 1965 (age 60) Guayaquil, Ecuador
- Party: Social Christian Party
- Website: cynthiaviteri.com

Cynthia Fernanda Viteri Jiménez de Váscones (born 19 November 1965) is an Ecuadorian lawyer, journalist and politician. On March 24, 2019, she was elected Mayor of Guayaquil, the second-largest city in Ecuador, in the sectional elections of Ecuador for a term from May 14, 2019 until May 14, 2023. She was the presidential candidate for Partido Social Cristiano in the 2017 presidential elections, and was a candidate in the 2006 presidential elections of Ecuador and finished fifth. Between 1998 and 2007 she was a member of the National Congress. In 2009 she became a member of the National Assembly.

== Early life ==
Viteri was born on 19 November 1965 in Guayaquil. Her parents are José Viteri Peña and Leonor Jiménez Campuzano.

Viteri went to the Colegio Inmaculada for her primary education and continued at the Indoamérica de Guayaquil. She studied at the University of Guayaquil where she got her licentiate in social science and politics. She continued at the same university, obtaining a doctor's degree in jurisprudence.

== Career ==
Viteri was a newsreader at Telecentro. She went on to become public relations manager of Jaime Nebot. Nebot leads the Social Christian Party and Viteri's sister, Nathalie Viteri, is one of their national assembly members.

== Political career ==
Viteri started her political career in 1997 when she was elected to the National Constituent Assembly for the Social Christian Party. After that congress finished in 1998 she was elected to the National Congress for Guayas Province. Her term ended in 2003. In the 2002 elections she was elected once more to the National Congress. Between 2005 and 2006 she was First Vice President of the National Congress. In that capacity she inaugurated Alfredo Palacio as President of Ecuador.

On 15 October 2006, she took part in the Ecuadorian presidential election and got 525,728 votes, representing 9.63% of the total poll.

Her term as member of Congress ended in 2007 when Rafael Correa called for a Constituent Assembly to replace the old Congress, that he deemed corrupt, and draft a new constitution. Viteri was elected to this Constituent Assembly. The Constituent Assembly proposed a National Assembly to replace the National Congress, this was approved by the population in the 2008 Ecuadorian constitutional referendum. In 2009 Viteri ran for the new National Assembly and was elected for Guayas Province. Viteri was reelected to National Assembly in the Ecuadorian general election of 2013, this time earning a seat for the National Constituency. The assembly was installed on 14 May 2013. After being elected Viteri became the longest serving legislator in Ecuador. In 2020 during the coronavirus, she ordered the local police to block the runway of the airport. Because of this action, several repatriation aircraft could not land. The Ecuadorian government was not happy with this action.

She was succeeded as mayor by Aquiles Álvarez in 2023 who criticised her lack of progress.

== Personal life ==
She is married to Juan Carlos Váscones. She has five children. Viteri's mother was a candidate for Plurinational Unity of the Lefts for the National Assembly in 2013 but did not win a seat.

On March 18, 2020, Viteri announced that she had been infected with the coronavirus (COVID-19).
