= Efraín Andrade Viteri =

Ecuadorian painter

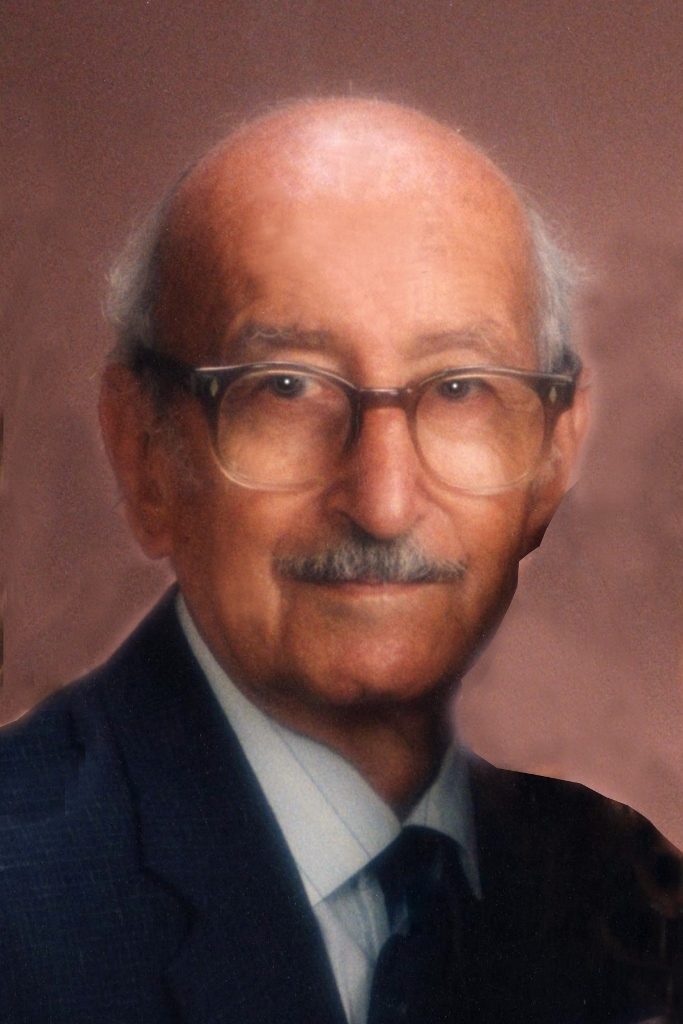
- Born: 15 May 1920; Loja, Ecuador
- Died: 1 July 1997 (aged 77)
- Education: Escuela de Bellas Artes
- Known for: Oil painting, pen-and-ink drawing, murals
- Notable work: Folke Anderson Mural (1958); Marimba en el campo (1992)
- Movement: Cubism, Realism
- Spouse: Flor de Maria Vásquez Tello (m. 1950; d. 1997)

Efraín Andrade Viteri (May 15, 1920 – July 1, 1997) was an Ecuadorian painter known as "The Painter of the Négritude Esmeraldeña".

Andrade pioneered the arts in Esmeraldas the mid-twentieth century, where he brought out the culture of the people of African descent through his artwork. He marked an era in the culture of Esmeraldas as the first painter to present an exhibition in June 1951 at Casa de la Cultura Benjamín Carrión. The work was highly admired by the audience and media. At a young age, Andrade mastered the pen and ink technique. The drawings and portraits are the ultimate representation of his artistic talent. One can see how the subjects take on new life in the exquisite delicacy of his pen strokes.

During the 1950s and 1960s most of his artwork was acquired by foreigners temporarily living in Esmeraldas, who later took the paintings to their own countries such as Sweden, Norway, France, the Netherlands and the United States. The greatest legacy of Andrade is the 2.5m x 15m Al Footbolista Mural on the façade of the Folke Anderson Stadium, which he designed and built in the mid-fifties.

== Biography ==
=== Early life ===
Efraín Andrade Viteri was born May 15, 1920, in the city of Loja, Ecuador. The eldest of Mayor Jaime Humberto Andrade Arteaga from Chone, Manabí, and Elina Josefa Viteri Aymar from Zaruma, El Oro. Due to his father's military career, the family lived in different cities the first ten years of Andrade's life. He went to elementary school in Portoviejo and Guayaquil, and in 1930 the family moved back to Quito where he continued his middle and high school studies, first at the Pensionado Mercedario, then Anexa Leopoldo Chávez del Normal Montalvo and Mejia High School.

=== Career ===
Andrade exhibited a vocation for painting early in life, and while attending high school designed and painted men's neckties and tagua-buttons for export to Italy. He studied painting and architecture at the Escuela de Bellas Artes (School of Fine Arts) from 1937 to 1941. During this time he developed good friendships with Eduardo Kingman, Cesar Bravomalo and Oswaldo Guayasamín.

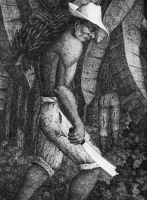
Carrying Banano

In 1941, Andrade moved to Manabí with the sole purpose of painting, and by the end of this year he had completed a collection of oil paintings and some portraits utilizing his already mastered “pen and ink” technique. He presented his first exhibition in Portoviejo, Manabí at Casa de la Cultura and soon after he returned to Quito to work along with his friend Dr. Humberto Albornoz at the “Plan Regulador” in the development of the first formal city planning project of the city of Quito.

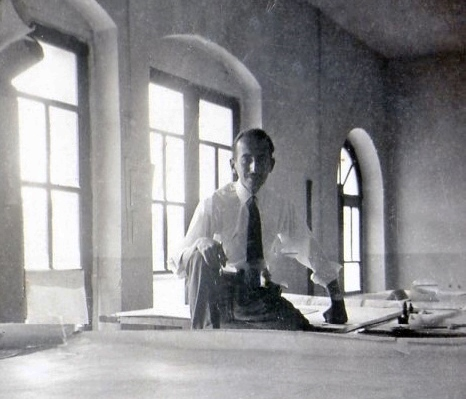
Efraín Andrade Viteri during his time as a member of the Quito City Planning Project (1945)

Andrade moved to Bogotá, Colombia in 1947 where he worked as commercial craft man and enjoyed the company of his good friend and artist César Bravomalo, who had also moved to Bogotá and made time to maintain his passion for painting. In September of that year, Andrade arranged an exhibition at the Dirección Cultural y Bellas Artes de Bogotá (Bogotá's Fine Art Board). The pen and ink portraits and drawings exhibited earned him a highly positive review from critic Ricardo Ortiz McCormick, Academic, published in El Tiempo on September 3, 1947.

His concern with social issues were expressed in his collection of photographs taken in the Lima and Cuzco areas where he traveled during 1948 with friend Luis Navarrete, and where he developed friendship with Dr. Agustin Vera Loor. In Cuzco he expressed his curiosity for the history behind the ancient ruins of Machu Picchu, then he spent time making the ruins his “still-models” and playing with light and contrast in his photography.

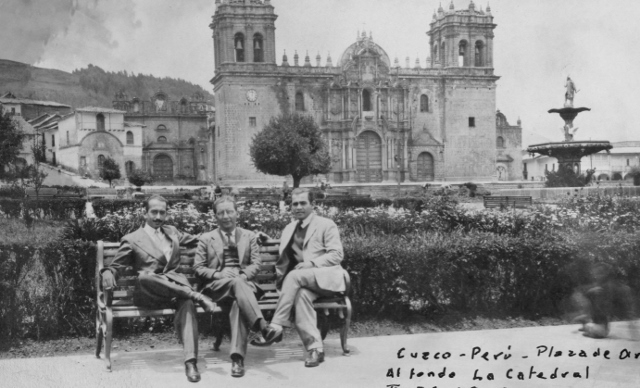
In Cuzco, Peru in 1948

In 1950 in Quito, Andrade met and married Flor de Maria Vásquez Tello, born in Manta, January 14, 1922, daughter of Octavio Vásquez Ruperti, from Manta, and Jesus Tello Arellano, from Esmeraldas.

Efraín and Flor de María settled in Esmeraldas, a then remote province bordering the Pacific Ocean to the west and Colombia to the north. Andrade felt in love with the green province from the first day he set foot on it. They had four children, Jorge Ernesto, Flor de Maria, Josefa Patricia and Gloria Teresa.

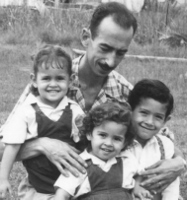
Efraín Andrade Viteri with his children in 1958.

After establishing himself in Esmeraldas, Andrade developed friendship with owner of Astral Co., Folke Anderson admired his artwork and enjoyed classic music like Efraín. Folke Anderson financed the construction of a stadium to donate to Esmeraldas and appointed Andrade to design and build a mural for the frontispiece of the stadium. The eleven figures that make up the mural represent the people of Esmeraldas' passion for soccer.

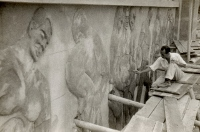
Efrain Andrade Viteri at work sculpting the "Al Futbolista" Mural, Folke Anderson Stadium, Esmeraldas, 1956.

In Esmeraldas, he used his knowledge and experience in the fields of calligraphy, draftsmanship and architecture. He designed and built schools and houses that were known for their functionality, beauty and artistic design. In 1960 he served as Director of Public Works City of Esmeraldas.

== Style ==
In the early fifties, Andrade experimented with the contemporary movement of cubism, but soon went back to the realist style that would characterize his work from then on. Andrade marked an era in the history of the artistic life of Esmeraldas: he was the first artist to present a painting exhibition in the Casa de la Cultura in June 1951.

Andrade was proud of his artistic work about the people of Esmeraldas, which to him represented the core essence of province. All his years Andrade worked on expressing the feelings and sufferings of the people he observed. He was not interested in publicity or fame, he wanted his paintings to speak for him. Nature was always the frame of his paintings. His encounter with the natural environment manifested after his arrival to Esmeraldas, the province he adopted as his own. Andrade exalted the value of nature as companion to human existence and saw beyond the human figure. He felt privileged to capture on his canvas the feelings of the people from Esmeraldas.

The use of strong colors, vivid characters and real issues has made his painting the cover letter of Esmeraldas. “Andrade captured, with a sense of movement, the spirit of the local people. For years, his paintings were almost the only artwork of Esmeraldas", wrote poet Antonio Preciado Bedoya in 2001.

His oil paintings feature the agile movement of a woman dancing to the sound of the marimba, the expression of joy of a child on a riverbank, the sweat on the back of a man carrying a banana bunch and the suffering of a father weeping over the body of his just deceased son. These expressions are part of the culture that Andrade immortalized through his paintings.

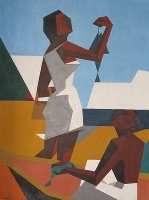
Buying Fish, an example of Andrade's early work in cubism.

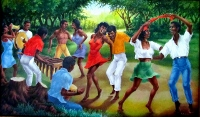
Marimba en el campo, an example of his artistic expression of Afro-Esmeraldean culture.

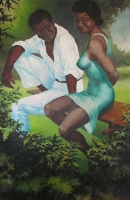
Enamorados. Nature and the greenery of Esmeraldas feature heavily in Andrade's painting.

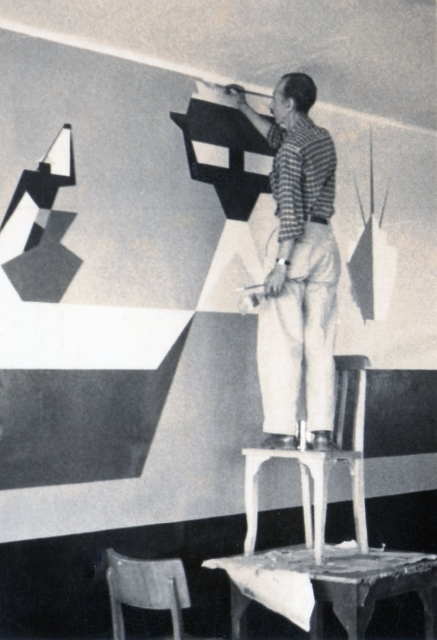
Painting the Mural Embarque in 1964. The mural represents the banana industry from the workers (left) to the shipping (right).

== Community Involvement ==
- Member of Quito City Planning Project (1942)
- Member and Columnist of Hélice Cultural Magazine of Esmeraldas (1955)
- Designed and built the mural of the Stadium Folke Anderson (1956)
- Sub-Director of Hélice Cultural Magazine (1959)
- City Planning Director of the Municipally of Esmeraldas (1960)
- Designed and Paint the Mural of Esmeraldas Central Bank (1964)

== Main Exhibits ==
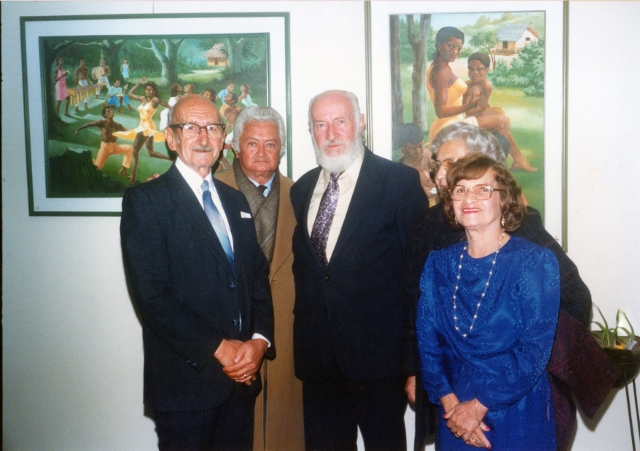
Efraín Andrade Viteri (far left) and his wife Flor de María (far right, blue dress) at an exhibit of his work at the Torres y Torres Gallery in 1991.

- Casa de la Cultura Ecuatoriana - Núcleo de Portoviejo (1941)
- Casa de la Cultura and Fine Art – Bogotá, Colombia (1947)
- Casa de la Cultura Ecuatoriana - Núcleo de Portoviejo (1948)
- Colonial Art Museum - Quito (1949)
- Casa de la Cultura Ecuatoriana- Esmeraldas (1951)
- Casa de la Cultura Ecuatoriana- Ambato (1952)
- Colombo Americano Exhibit– Caracas, Venezuela (1952)
- Casa de la Cultura Ecuatoriana - Quito (1956)
- Central University, Bodegón Hall - Quito (1958)
- Casa de la Cultura – Esmeraldas (1965)
- Casa de la Cultura - Esmeraldas (1968)
- Colonial Art Museum - Quito (1969)
- Colonial Art Museum - Quito (1982)
- Mariano Aguilera Gallery - Quito (1987)
- Torres y Torres Gallery- Quito (1991)
- Central Bank Museum – Esmeraldas (2001)
- Casa de la Cultura Ecuatoriana – Esmeraldas (2014)
- Casa de la Cultura “Benjamín Carrión” – Quito (2015)

== Awards ==
Andrade has been recognized as the greatest artist of Esmeraldas. His paintings were the first artistic expression of the Afro-Esmeraldean culture. In 1952 Andrade brought out the culture of the people of Esmeraldas throughout his painting, sculptures, murals, and architectural work. Awards given acknowledged his artistic ability and unique contribution to the art and culture of Esmeraldas.

Andrade designed schools and houses and one was the recipient of award as “Best designed house of the year” for its beauty and functionality.

- Diploma of Honor from the Association of Artists in Manabí (1968)
- Honorable Mention of the Municipality of Esmeraldas (1984)
- Recipient of the Gold Medal “Simón Plata Torres” (1988)
- Honorable Provincial Council Board Award (1995)
- Postmortem Honorable Mention from the Municipality of Esmeraldas (1997)
