= Darío Fernández Jaen =

Panamanian politician and broadcaster

- Born: March 10, 1946; Coclé
- Died: November 6, 2011 (aged 65); Coclé
- Occupations: Journalist, Politician
- Years active: 1980s–2011

Darío Fernández or Darío Fernández Jaen (1946–2011) was a Panamanian politician and broadcaster. He was the former governor of the province of Coclé and the owner of a radio station, Mi Favorita. He was assassinated for allegedly exposing government corruption and illegal activities.

== Biography ==
Fernández was born on March 10, 1946, and was raised in the Coclé countryside. His family has deep roots in the region and Fernández was known for advancing the interest of his community throughout his life. He became the provincial leader of Panama's Democratic Revolutionary Party. He became the governor of the province of Coclé in 1985, 1996, and 2004, during the administrations of the Ernesto Perez Balladares and Martin Torrijos. After retiring from politics, he obtained a degree in journalism. He started working as a teacher and journalist.

After his involvement in politics, Fernández became the owner of the radio station Mi Favorita. He was also one of its commentators and hosted his own political commentary program. He often criticized corruption and irregularities in the allocation of land titles in Coclé del Norte. Fernández was also an outspoken critic of President Ricardo Martinelli.

== Assassination ==
On November 6, 2011, Fernández was shot point blank in the head on his way home. He died in front of his wife and son. The identities of the assailants were not immediately known. A government worker was initially arrested but the suspect's lawyer was able to present a supermarket surveillance footage in Panama City, which placed him in its premises buying beer at the time of the shooting. The gunman was later identified as Joel Guerra Flores, also known as Chiri. He was part of the notorious gang The Barracudas and several of its members were allegedly seen stalking Fernández' neighborhood days before the attack. One of its members, Miguel Arner Garcia, already knocked at the victim's house hours prior to the shooting in search of the politician.

It was reported that the murder was motivated by his criticisms of the irregularities in the allocation of local land titles. Through his program, he revealed that government officials were involved in the distribution of lands to individuals close to the government.
