= Alicia Viteri =

Panamanian artist (born 1946)

- Born: 1946 (age 78–79); Pasto, Nariño, Colombia
- Known for: Installations; drawings of insects; computer graphic; lithography
- Movement: Post Modernism (1970s); installation art (1970s); digital art (1990)

Alicia Viteri (born 1946 in Pasto, Colombia) is a Panamanian artist who is a leading figure in Latina contemporary art. Viteri began her career with printmaking and installations and then turned to digital arts later on the mid-to-late 1990s.

== Education and career ==
In 1968, Alicia Viteri was a college student at the Centro Colombia-Norte Americano in Bogota, Colombia, where she participated in her very first group exhibition as an artist. In 1970, she was a graduate from the School of Fine Arts at the Universidad de los Andres, also in Bogota, Colombia.

In 1972, Viteri moved to Panama, where she had her very first solo exhibition. Within the same year, she began working as a professor at the University of Panama for a printmaking course.

For a very short time, Viteri lived and worked in Ecuador from 1977-78.

== Exhibition and works ==
1970-76 was a period of intense pictorial activity and participation in local and international exhibitions and biennials. One of Viteri's first artistic activities was in 1970 with the Young Artists Biennia at the Museum of Contemporary Art, Bogota, Colombia. Three years later, she participated in the Second Graphic Arts Biennial in Cali, Colombia and then later, her work was featured in the Casa de la Cultura (House of Culture) in Quito, Ecuador.

Viteri's art incorporates many types of media, including drawing, painting, printmaking, photography, fabric, book making, and even audio for her famous installation/mural titled Pictorial Space (held on a 7m x 2.7m fabric surface). Viteri's work displays an interest in insects and she developed a powerful passion for observing them at the Printmaking Workshop at the Universidad de los Andres, under the supervision of Umberto Giangrandi and the knowing gaze of Juan Antonio Roda. Later on in Viteri's artwork, these beetles, ants and flies slowly become humanized, which is taken to represent an examination of the inner self. She got rid of wings and insect-like limbs and joined carnivals and funerals as men and women of extravagant features and expressions walked through canvases to finally congregate in the large mural Pictorial Space.

Alicia Viteri specialized in lithography at the Blau Workshop in Formentara, Spain in 1983. Within the same year, Viteri worked on creating her new work, Pictorial Spaces, a 7’x3’ mural, the first example of installation art in Panama. This mural is an exhibit of artwork presented at the Centro Colombo Americano in Bogota, Colombia and has traveled to many locations around the world such as the Intar Gallery in New York, the Hispanic At Center in New York, the Galeria of Quito, the Museo de Arte Contemporaneo in Panama City, La Tertulia Museum in Cali, and the Banco de la Republica in Pasto.

The mural includes six panels executed in oil on canvas, in black, white, silver, and gold showing a theme of carnivals and funerals. Some of the color palette includes colors red, pink, yellow, and orange that Viteri chose to be projected onto the panels with figures of people. At the time, installation work was still a newly-explored medium in Panama. An early example is the work of Miguel Angels Rojas, who began to explore the medium at the end of the 1970s in the Atenas Salon and the project room at the Museum of Modern Art in Bogota, Colombia. Viteri's work also uses recordings of urban noise with music and lighting.

The exhibition includes the primary drafts for the mural, along with the series of drawings and prints of insects and the series entitled The Mummy.

Her artwork examines the relationship between her inner world and the transposition of human perception in profane concepts.

== Accomplishments ==
- In 1979, Viteri founded the Printmaking Workshop at the Panamanian Institute of Art, where she was responsible for revitalizing an interest in printmaking as an artistic medium in Panama. She retired from this position in 1983.
- During her years of teaching at the Panamanian Institute of Art, Alicia planned and carried out the project “Eleven Prints,” a portfolio with works by the best Panamanian artist of that time.
- In 1981, she directed the graphic series Panarte Editions. In 1984, Viteri was part of a graphic design club portfolio printed at Prografica, and the portfolio of the Religious Music Festival in Popayan, both in Colombia.

== Publications ==
Alicia Viteri's book Memoria Digital/Digital Memory was published in 2000, where she uses the technique of computer art and recreated digital photography of her family and friends, recounting her life through images and brief legends. In 2009, it won second place for Best Arts Book in the Spanish/Bilingual category of the 11th Annual International Latino Book Awards. The landscape she has been working on since sometime ago became a parallel production that allows her to approach color and to leave behind the black- and- white world of her insects, carnivals, and funerals while deepening her mastery of the craft of painting. They are bright, full-of-life photos of her family and friends, mixed with digital design.

In the middle of her new project, Viteri became very ill and while overcoming all obstacles with great tenacity, and with the support of Benjamin Villegas, the book project moved forward and came to life. The project was finished and launched in March 2009 in Panama City, and in mid-April in Bogota at the Gabriel Garcia Marquez Cultural Center. Alicia Viteri created these pieces of artwork by putting her pictorial and graphic expertise to the limit by using the services provided by technology. She used computer software to replace brushes, burins, and the sharp point of a pencil. The format of the book features a violet silk cover and the image of Alicia as a child, which turns into a delicate object. A translucent-paper sheet precedes it as if one was looking through a photo-album.
