= Jessica Castillo =

Ecuadorian politician

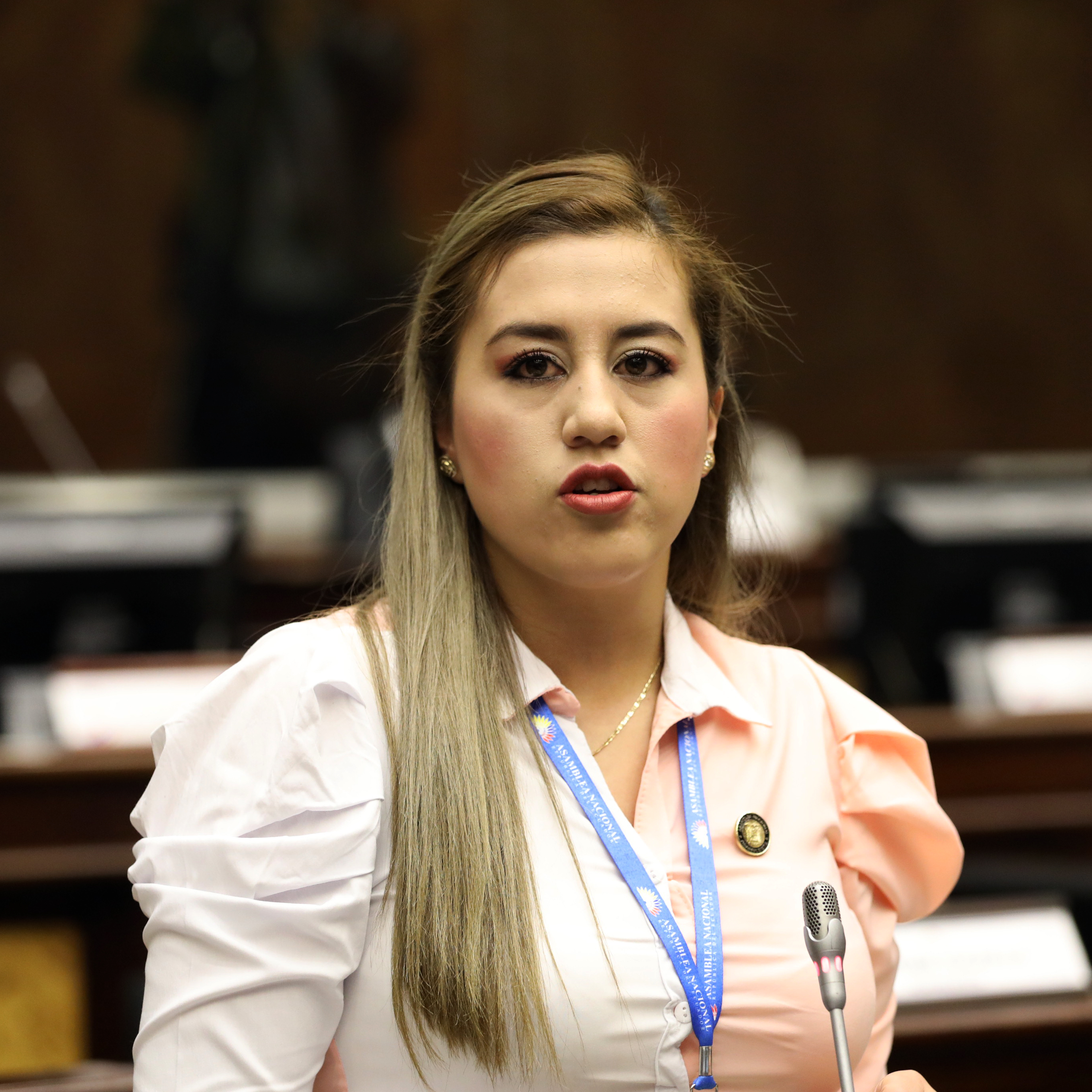
- Education: Salesian Polytechnic University
- Occupation: politician
- Known for: elected to Ecuador's 4th National Assembly
- Political party: Pachakutik Plurinational Unity Movement – New Country

Jessica Carolina Castillo Cárdenas is an Ecuadorian politician elected to the National Assembly of Ecuador.

== Life ==
She studied anthropology at the Salesian Polytechnic University. Castillo is one of three elected to the National Assembly of Ecuador to represent the Pichincha Province. The others are Jose Fernando Cabascango Collaguazo and Dina Maribel Farinango Quilumbaquin. They are all members of the Pachakutik Plurinational Unity Movement – New Country party.

In November 2021 she was one of the 81 politicians who abstained which allowed the Economic Development and Fiscal Sustainability Law to be passed. Other abstainers included Sofía Espín, Ana Herrera, Gissella Molina, Sofía Sánchez and Nathalie Viteri.

In January 2022 she presented a case for a reform to the law that would make the carrying of knives or other bladed weapons punishable by a sentence of one to three years. Those who required these for their work including the police would be exempt.
