= List of radio stations in Panama City =

This is a list of radio stations. There are 22 FM stations and 5 AM stations in Panama City.

== Radio station ==
=== AM Stations ===
Frequency	Name	Website	City
670 kHz	Radio Hogar 670	Website	Panama City
690 kHz	Radio Evangelio Vivo 690	Website	Panama City
1060 kHz	La Voz Internacional 1060	Website	Panama City
1470 kHz	La Primerisima 1470	Website	Panama City
1580 kHz	Hosanna Manantial 1580	Website	Panama City

=== FM Stations ===
Frequency	Name	Website	City
88.1 MHz	Radio 10 88.1	Website	Panama City
88.9 MHz	Sol Radio 88.9	Website	Panama City
89.3 MHz	Cool FM 89.3	Website	Panama City
90.5 MHz	Super Q 90.5	Website	Panama City
90.9 MHz	RPC Radio 90.9	Website	Panama City
91.7 MHz	Maxima Panama 91.7	Website	Panama City
92.1 MHz	Radio Ancón 92.1	Website	Panama City
92.9 MHz	YXY 92.9 FM	Website	Panama City
93.5 MHz	Radio Metropolis 93.5	Website	Panama City
94.5 MHz	Radio Panamá 94.5/ W Radio Panama	Website Website	Panama City
94.9 MHz	Hosanna Capital 94.9	Website	Panama City
95.3 MHz	La Exitosa 95.3	Website	Panama City
96.1 MHz	Stereo Fe 96.1	Website	Panama City
96.7 MHz	Radio Mia 96.7	Website	Panama City
98.3 MHz	La Mega 98.3	Website	Panama City
99.7 MHz	Tropi Q FM 99.7	Website	Panama City
100.1 MHz	Antena 8 FM 100.1	Website	Panama City
100.5 MHz	Fabulosa Estereo 100.5	Website	Panama City
101.5 MHz	Radio Disney 101.5	Website	Panama City
102.1 MHz	Lo Nuestro 102.1	Website	Panama City
102.5 MHz	FM Corazon 102.5	Website	Panama City
106.7 MHz	Rock n Pop 106.7	Website	Panama City
107.3 MHz	Omega Stereo 107.3	Website	Panama City
