= Patricia Sánchez =

Ecuadorian politician

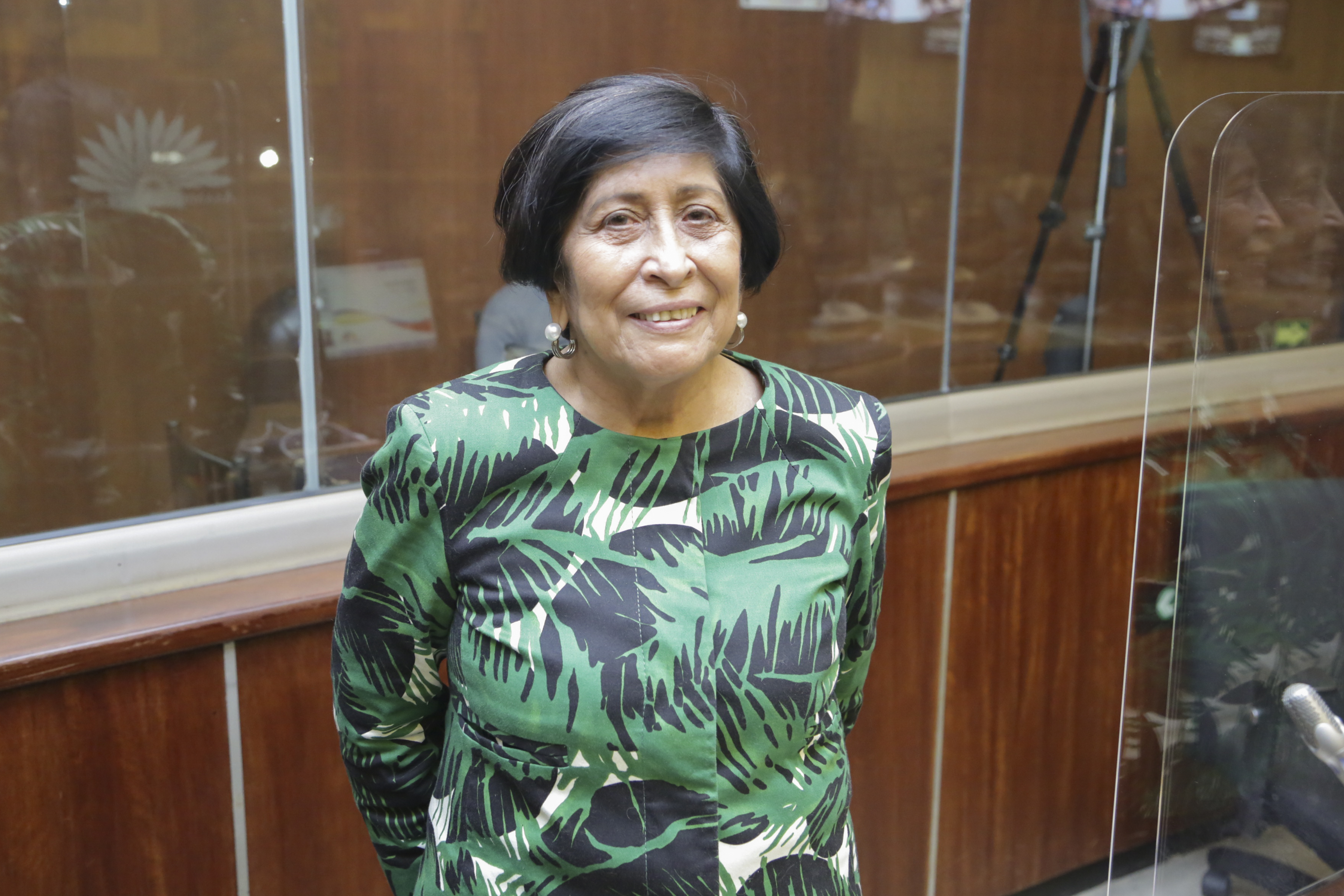
- Born: 1958 (age 67–68); Cuenca, Ecuador
- Occupation: politician
- Known for: elected to Ecuador's 4th National Assembly
- Political party: Pachakutik Plurinational Unity Movement – New Country

Bertha Patricia Sánchez Gallegos (born 1958) is a politician of Ecuador. She is a member of the National Assembly of Ecuador for the Pachakutik Plurinational Unity Movement – New Country party.

== Life ==
Sánchez was born in Cuenca in 1958. She studied in several countries at the Pontifical Catholic University of Chile, the Latin American School for Social Sciences and Central University of Venezuela.

She learned that she was elected to the National Assembly of Ecuador for the Pachakutik Plurinational Unity Movement – New Country.

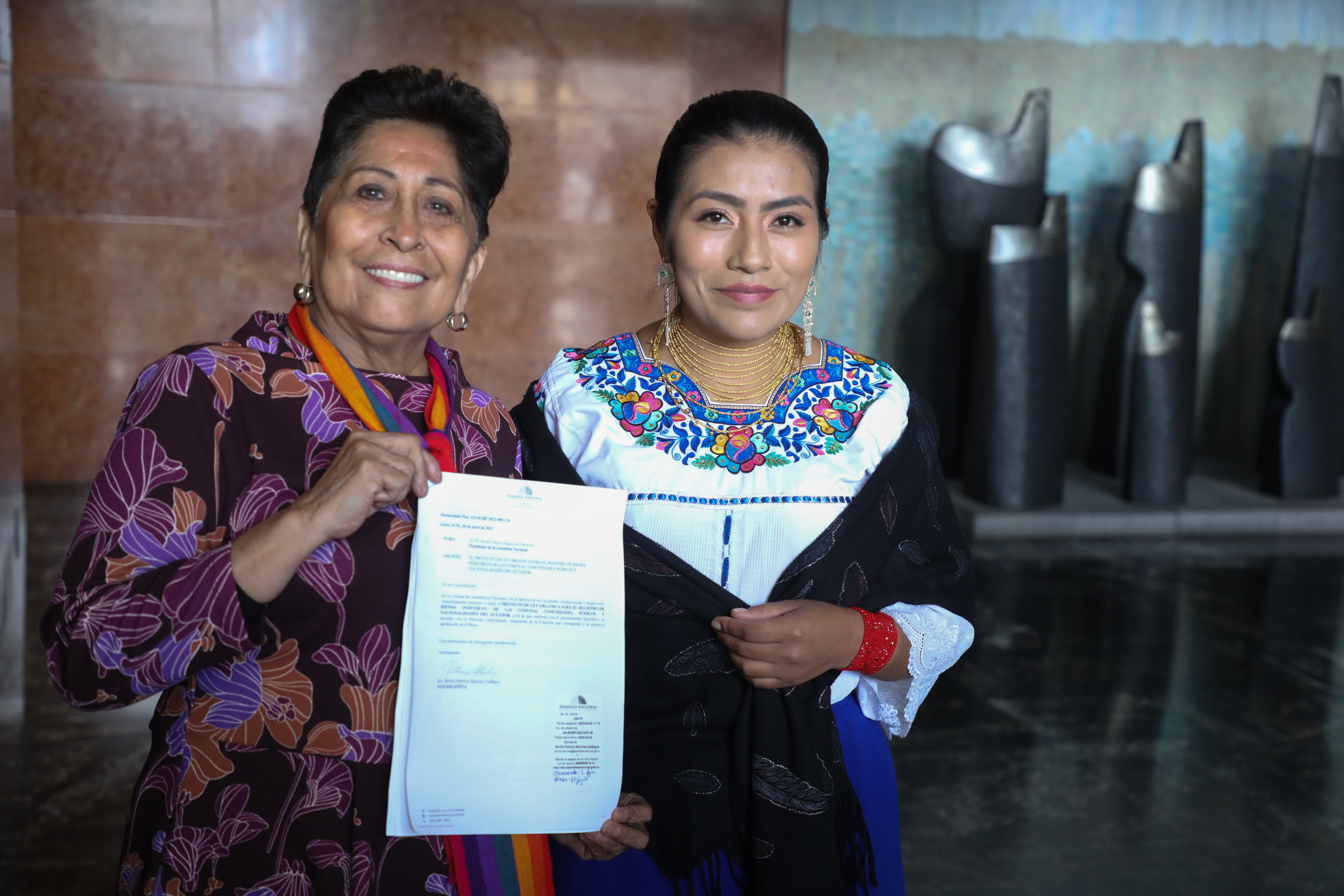
Patricia Sánchez and Sofia Sánchez with a parliamentary Bill in 2023

In November 2021 she was one of the 81 politicians who abstained which allowed the Economic Development and Fiscal Sustainability Law to be passed. Other abstainers included Jessica Castillo, Sofía Espín, Gissella Molina, Sofía Sánchez and Ana Herrera.

On 1 April 2022 she was thrown out of the Pachakutik Plurinational Unity Movement – New Country party for contempt, not attending meetings, having agendas and not supporting the party's policies. The others excluded were Mario Ruíz, Mireya Pazmino, Fernando Cabascango, Darwin Pereira and Peter Calo.

January 2023 saw a debate on laws to protect women from violence. On 24 January Sanchez spoke about the problem in the Ecuadorian Amazon. She noted that nearly 70% of women over the age of 15 have said that they have suffered violence during their lives.

In March 2023 she addressed the National Assembly to question a proposed law that it was thought might undermine the independence of the country's universities.
