= Ana Herrera =

Ecuadorian politician

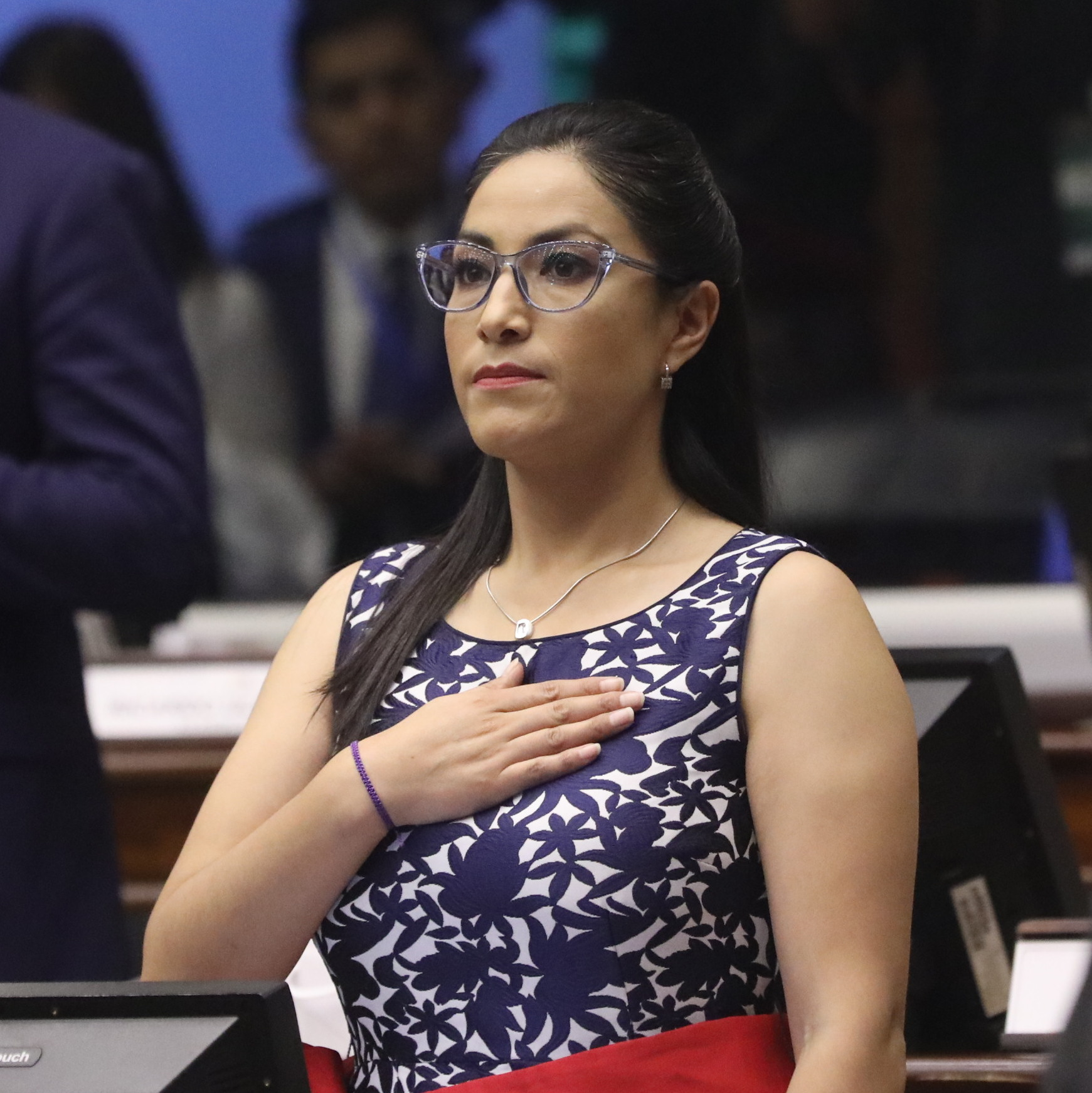
- Herrara in 2023
- Occupation: politician
- Known for: elected to Ecuador's 4th National Assembly

Ana Cecilia Herrera Gómez is an Ecuadorian politician who was elected to the National Assembly of Ecuador. She was re-elected in 2023.

== Life ==
Herrera represents the province of Cotopaxi at the National Assembly of Ecuador. She occupies seat number 31. In November 2021 she was one of the 81 politicians who abstained which allowed the Economic Development and Fiscal Sustainability Law to be passed. Other abstainers included Gissella Molina, Dina Farinango and Patricia Sánchez.

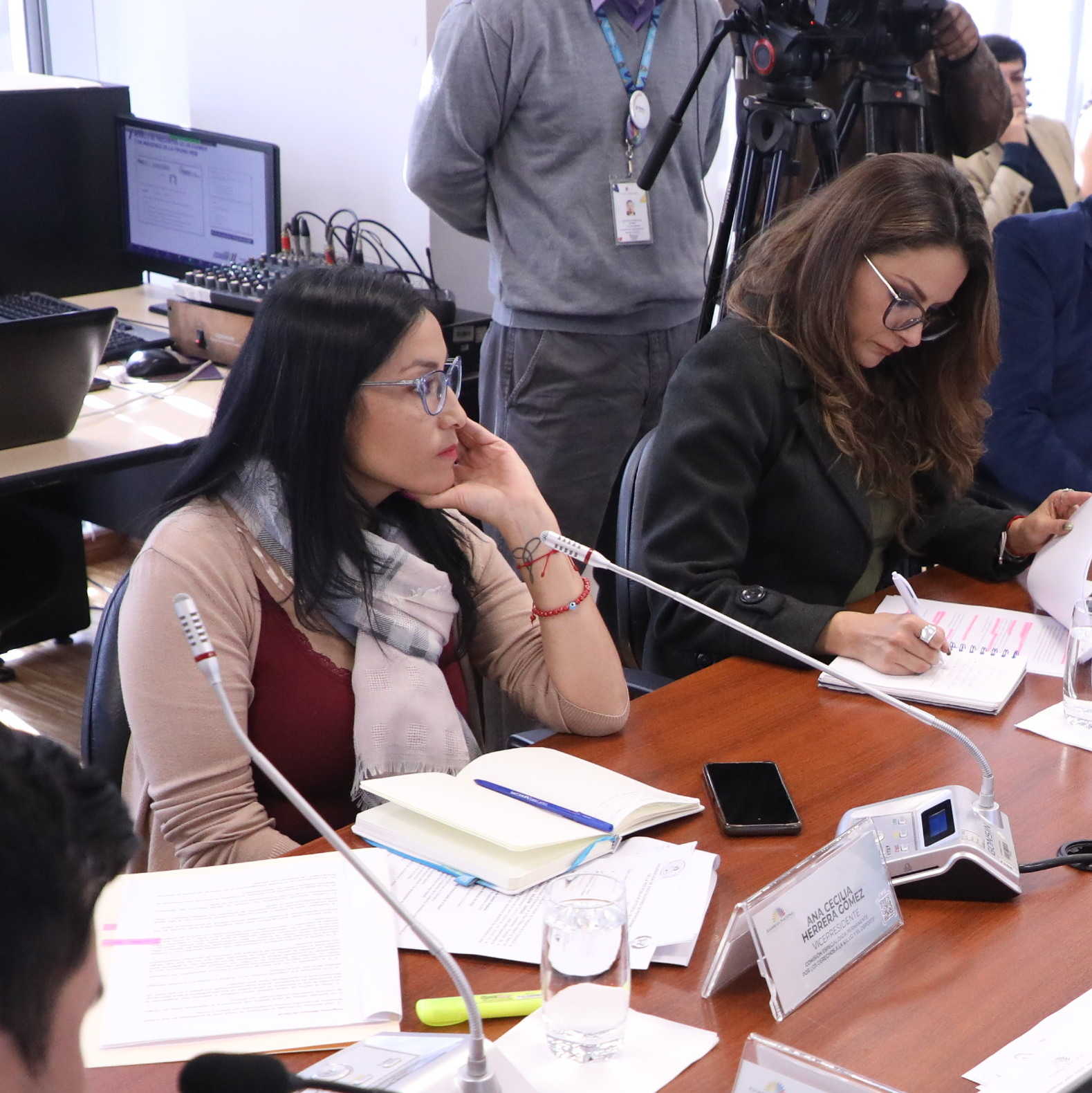
Ana Herrera and Rosa Mayorga at Ecuador's Health Commission in January 2024

In September 2022 the murder and presumed femicide of the lawyer María Belén Bernal gained international importance and the case was debated in the assembly and mentioned in the United Nations. Femicide in Ecuador is a problem and a specific offence which some believe is underreported in Ecuador. A five-woman team proposed by Pamela Aguirre was appointed to oversee the investigation after the main suspect, a police officer, had fled. The team members were Ana Herrera, Mireya Pazmiño, Marjorie Chávez, Yeseña Guamaní and Amada Ortiz who was still an independent member. Herrera was to lead the team with Guamani as the vice-president.

The President of Ecuador Guillermo Lasso brought in the constitution clause number 148 known as Mutual death in May 2023 when he knew that he was about to be impeached. This required all of the National Assembly members to stand for re-election. Herrara and 67 others stood for re-election and she was one of the 43 re-elected later that year. The others included Pierina Correa, Paola Cabezas, Patricia Núñez, Sofía Sánchez, Gissella Molina and Patricia Mendoza.

She was re-elected in the 2025 elections. In May 2025 she was elected to join the Oversight and Political Control Commission of the National Assembly. The President of that commission was Ferdinan Álvarez. The commission oversee political trials. The other members of the commission include Nataly Morillo, María Paula Villacreses Herrera, Janeth Katherine Bustos Salazar, Ana Belén Tapia and Fabiola Sanmartín.
