= Bolívar Province (Ecuador) =

Province of Ecuador

Bolivar Bolívar (Spanish)
- Province
- Province of Bolívar
- Flag

- Location of the Bolívar Province in Ecuador.

- Cantons of Bolívar Province
- Coordinates: 1°36′S 79°5′W
- Country: Ecuador
- Established: April 23, 1884
- Capital: Guaranda
- Cantons: List of Cantons

Government
  - Prefect: Aníbal Coronel (MUPP)
  - Vice Prefect: María E. Coles
  - Governor: Andrés Pozo

Area
  - Province: 3,956 km^{2} (1,527 sq mi)

Population (2022 census)
  - Province: 199,078
  - Density: 50.32/km^{2} (130.3/sq mi)
  - Urban: 64,172
- Time zone: UTC-5 (ECT)
- Vehicle registration: B
- HDI (2017): 0.714 high · 19th
- Website: www.gobiernodebolivar.gob.ec

Bolívar (Spanish pronunciation: [boˈliβaɾ]) is a province in Ecuador. The capital is Guaranda. Much of the province has a cool, 'sierra' climate, as it is located in the Andes Mountains. The area in the lower foothills has a cold, tundra-like climate.

== Cantons ==
The province is divided into seven cantons. The following table lists each with its population as of the 2010 census, its area in square kilometres (km^{2}), and the name of the canton seat or capital.

Canton	Pop. (2019)	Area (km^{2})	Seat/Capital
Caluma	16,160	176.54	Caluma
Chillanes	17,020	662.67	Chillanes
Chimbo	17,320	261.42	Chimbo
Echeandía	13,960	230.33	Echeandía
Guaranda	107,590	1,892.08	Guaranda
Las Naves	7,330	148.82	Las Naves
San Miguel	29,010	573.52	San Miguel

== Demographics ==
Ethnic groups as of the Ecuadorian census of 2010:

- Mestizo 69.6%
- Indigenous 25.4%
- White 2.7%
- Montubio 1.1%
- Afro-Ecuadorian 1.1%
- Other 0.1%

== Politics ==
Results of the Ecuadorian presidential elections of 2013 in Bolívar Province:

- Rafael Correa (PAIS) 33.7%
- Guillermo Lasso (CREO) 27.7%
- Lucio Gutiérrez (PSP) 25.4%
- Mauricio Rodas (SUMA) 4.9%
- Alberto Acosta (UPI) 4.2%
- Álvaro Noboa (PRIAN) 2.4%
- Norman Wray (Ruptura 25) 1.0%
- Nelson Zavala (PRE) 0.8%

== See also ==
- Provinces of Ecuador
- Cantons of Ecuador
