= Guaranda Canton =

- Canton
- Guaranda Canton in Bolívar Province

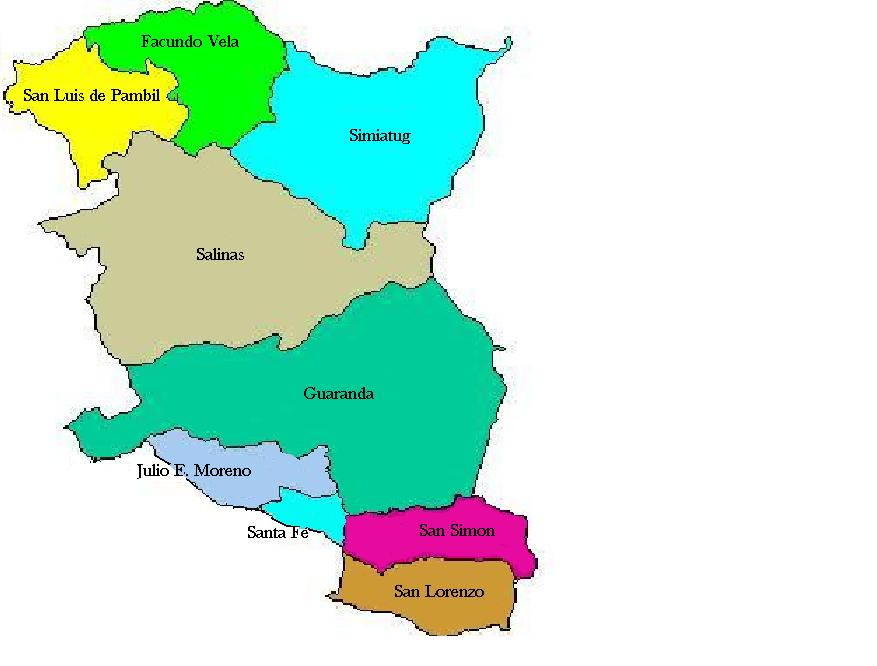
- Parishes of Guaranda Canton
- Coordinates: 1°36′20″S 79°0′11″W
- Country: Ecuador
- Province: Bolívar Province
- Capital: Guaranda

Area
  - Total: 1,860 km^{2} (720 sq mi)

Population (2022 census)
  - Total: 98,130
  - Density: 52.8/km^{2} (137/sq mi)
- Time zone: UTC-5 (ECT)

Guaranda Canton is a canton of Ecuador in the Bolívar Province. Its capital is Guaranda and its population in the 2001 census is 81,643.

== Demographics ==
Ethnic groups as of the Ecuadorian census of 2010:

- Mestizo 49.1%
- Indigenous 47.0%
- White 2.3%
- Montubio 0.8%
- Afro-Ecuadorian 0.7%
- Other 0.1%

== Politics ==
Results of the Ecuadorian presidential elections of 2013 in Guaranda Canton:

- Rafael Correa (PAIS) 33.6%
- Guillermo Lasso (CREO) 30.2%
- Lucio Gutiérrez (PSP) 20.2%
- Alberto Acosta (UPI) 6.9%
- Mauricio Rodas (SUMA) 4.7%
- Álvaro Noboa (PRIAN) 2.2%
- Norman Wray (Ruptura 25) 1.2%
- Nelson Zavala (PRE) 0.9%
