= Caluma Canton =

- Canton
- Location of Bolívar Province in Ecuador.

- Caluma Canton in Bolívar Province
- Coordinates: 1°38′S 79°15′W
- Country: Ecuador
- Province: Bolívar Province
- Capital: Caluma

Area
  - Total: 175.5 km^{2} (67.8 sq mi)

Population (2022 census)
  - Total: 15,607
  - Density: 88.93/km^{2} (230.3/sq mi)
- Time zone: UTC-5 (ECT)

Caluma Canton is a canton of Ecuador, located in the Bolívar Province. Its population at the 2010 census was 13,129.

== Demographics ==
Ethnic groups as of the Ecuadorian census of 2010:

- Mestizo 91.8%
- White 3.1%
- Indigenous 2.3%
- Afro-Ecuadorian 1.5%
- Montubio 1.1%
- Other 0.2%

== Politics ==
Results of the Ecuadorian presidential elections of 2013 in Caluma Canton:

- Lucio Gutiérrez (PSP) 33.6%
- Rafael Correa (PAIS) 31.0%
- Guillermo Lasso (CREO) 21.3%
- Mauricio Rodas (SUMA) 9.1%
- Álvaro Noboa (PRIAN) 3.0%
- Alberto Acosta (UPI) 0.8%
- Norman Wray (Ruptura 25) 0.5%
- Nelson Zavala (PRE) 0.5%
