= Nina Pacari =

Kichwa politician, lawyer and indigenous leader

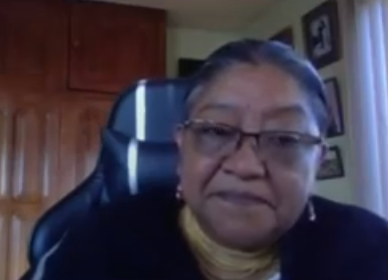
- Nina Pacari, 2020

Judge of the Constitutional Court of Ecuador
- Incumbent
- Assumed office May 2007

Personal details
- Born: 9 October 1961 (age 64) Cotacachi
- Education: Central University of Ecuador

Nina Pacari (Kichwa nina "fire", paqariy "to appear, dawn"), born as María Estela Vega Conejo (born 9 October 1961 in Cotacachi, Imbabura) is a Kichwa politician, lawyer and indigenous leader from Ecuador.

== Biography ==
Nina Pacari studied jurisprudence at the Central University of Ecuador in Quito, where she got to know other indigenous students and began to fight for indigenous rights and the defense of the Kichwa language. At the age of 24, she changed her Spanish name officially to the Kichwa Nina Pacari.

Nina Pacari worked as a lawyer for the Federación de los pueblos Kichwa de la Sierra Norte del Ecuador (FICI), an organization in Imbabura which is now a member of ECUARUNARI. After that, she supported Kichwa communities as a lawyer in the Chimborazo Province.

In 1989, she became a legal adviser of the indigenous confederation CONAIE, founded in 1986. In the uprising of 1990 she supported indigenous communities in Chimborazo and participated in the negotiations with the government. In 1994, she worked out an alternative draft against the draft law of president Sixto Durán Ballén, which was not realized due to the peasants' resistance.

=== Political career ===
In 1997, she was the representative of Chimborazo in the National Assembly and collaborated in the elaboration of the new constitution. In August 1998, she was the first indigenous woman to be elected to the Ecuadorian parliament, as a member of the newly established Pachakutik movement.

In 2003, she became the foreign minister in the government of Lucio Gutiérrez, but soon after she resigned together with the agriculture minister Luis Macas because of the neoliberal policy of Gutiérrez.

In May 2007, she was elected judge of the Constitutional Court of Ecuador.

== Works ==
- Las cultures nacionales en el estado multinacional ecuatoriano. Antropolgía, cuadernos de investigación 3 (noviembre de 1984): 113-22.
- Los indios y su lucha jurídico-política. Revista ecuatoriana de pensamientomarxista 12 (1989): 41-47.
- Levantamiento indígena. In Sismo étnico en el Ecuador: Varias perspecti-vas, edited by José Almeida et al., 169-86. Quito, Ecuador: CEDIME—Ediciones Abya-Yala, 1993.
- Taking on the Neoliberal Agenda. NACLA Report on the Americas 29, no. 5 (March–April 1996): 23-32

"The Political Participation of Indigenous Women in the Ecuadorian Congress: Unfinished Business"lInternational IDEA, 2002, Women in Parliament, Stockholm (http://www.idea.int).
