= Sylka Sánchez =

Ecuadorian politician (born 1970)

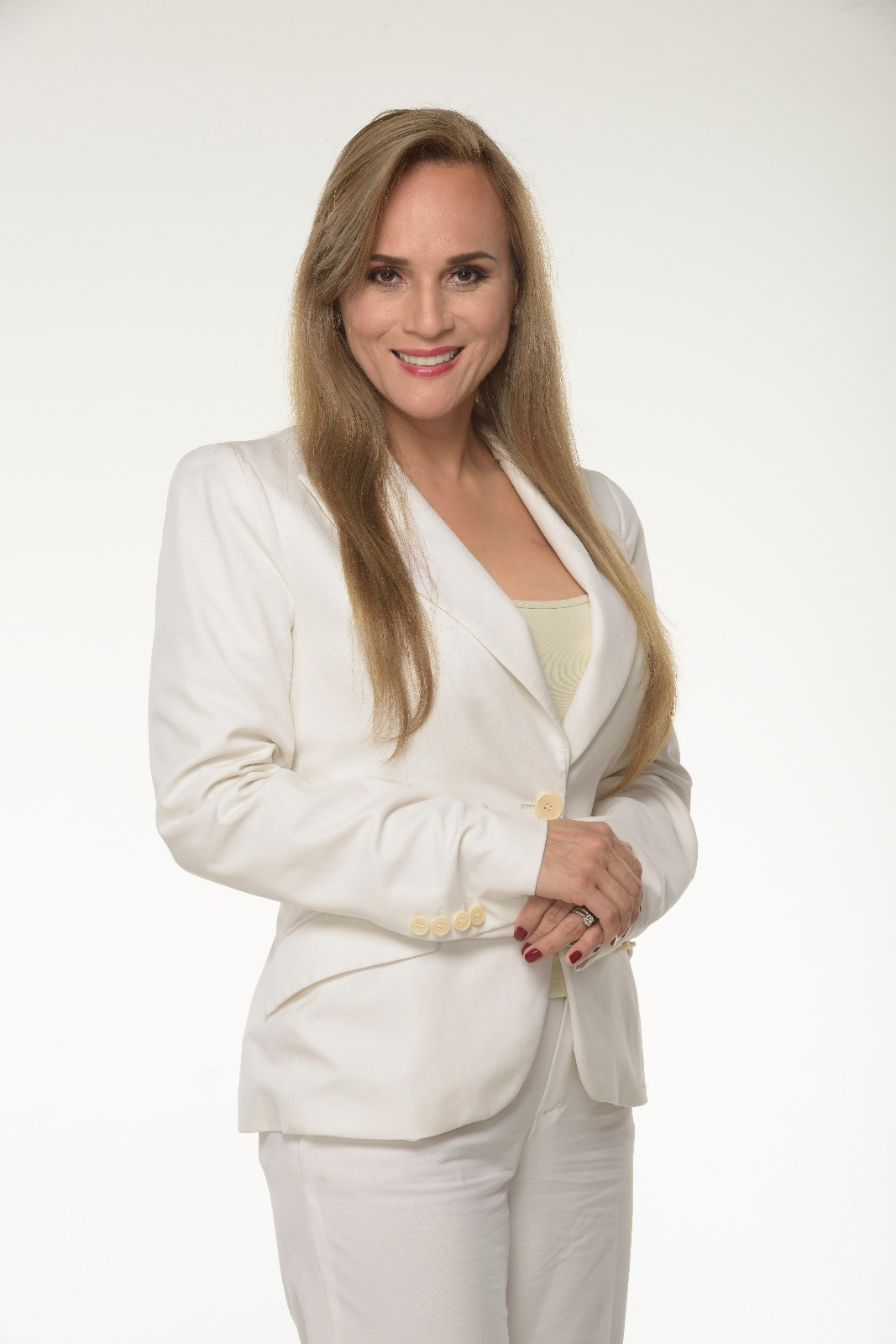

National Congress of Ecuador For Guayas
- In office 5 January 2003 – 2007

Personal details
- Born: Sylka Estefanía Sánchez Campos; 19 July 1970 (age 56) Guayaquil
- Party: PRIAN
- Education: Universidad Laica Vicente Rocafuerte
- Occupation: Politician, lawyer

Sylka Estefanía Sánchez Campos, Doctor in laws (b. 19 July 1970) is an Ecuadorian politician, lawyer, and businesswoman.

== Biography ==
Sylka Sánchez was born on 19 July 1970 in Guayaquil, Ecuador in the home of Wilson Sánchez Castello y María Campos. She completed her secondary studies t the Urdesa School and pursued higher education at the Universidad Laica Vicente Rocafuerte, graduating from there as a lawyer. Later, she would acquire a degree in Political and Social sciences and then a PhD in Jurisprudence from the same university. In 1989, Sánchez won the Queen of Guayaquil pageant.

In 1994, Sánchez began working as an assistant in the legal department of the Litoral Bank, owned by Álvaro Noboa. The following year, she was hired to the same position by the Noboa Corporation and later became its legal procurator. In 1998, she became the vice president of the Noboa Corporation and would later ascend to become the global legal director of 115 companies in the conglomerate. From 1999 to 2000, Sánchez would manage all the fruit, produce, and coffee, flour, and shipping companies under the Noboa Corporation.
