= 2009 Ecuadorian general election =

- 26 April 2009
- Presidential election
- Registered: 10,532,234
- Turnout: 75.28%
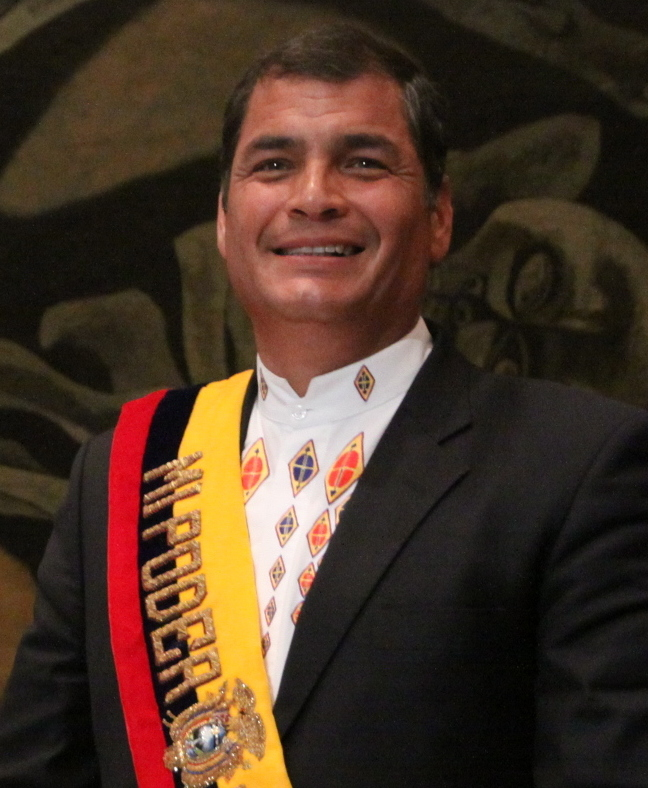

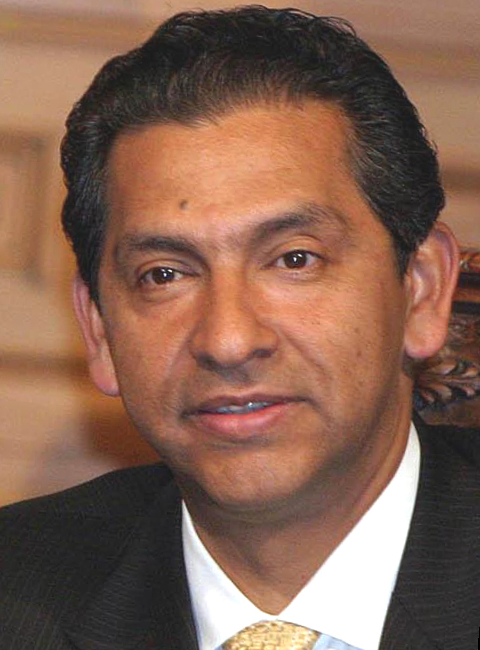

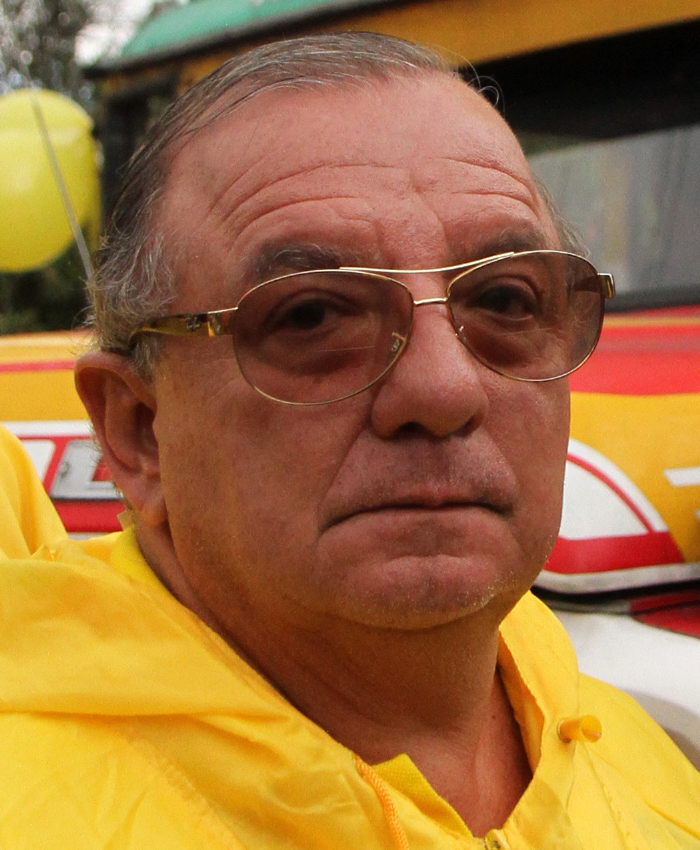
Nominee	Rafael Correa	Lucio Gutiérrez	Álvaro Noboa
Party	PAIS Alliance	PSP	PRIAN
Running mate	Lenín Moreno	Felipe Mantilla	Anabella Azín
Popular vote	3,586,439	1,947,830	786,718
Percentage	51.99%	28.24%	11.41%
- Map of results of the first round by province.
President before election
Rafael Correa
PAIS Alliance
Elected President
Rafael Correa
PAIS Alliance

Early general elections were held in Ecuador on 26 April 2009 following the approval of a new constitution in a referendum held on 28 September 2008. President Rafael Correa ran for his first term under the new constitution. The election was initially expected to be held in October 2010.

Among the candidates for President were current President Rafael Correa, supported by his PAIS Alliance and the Socialist Party; Álvaro Noboa ran under the banner of the PRIAN and had the support of the Social Christian Party (PSC) and the Christian Democratic Union. Former president Lucio Gutiérrez ran as the candidate of the January 21 Patriotic Society Party.

Preliminary results suggested that Correa had won reelection in the first round easily, surpassing 50% of the vote, followed by Gutiérrez coming in second with about 28% of the vote. Correa's came short of having an absolute majority in parliament.

In addition Correa became the first sitting president to be reelected since García Moreno in 1875.

The full results of the seat distribution was still known, though it was assumed that PAIS would have 59 seats, PSP 19, PSC/MG 11, PRIAN 7, MPD 5, the Municipalist Movement 5, and others less than 5 seats.

== Opinion polls ==
Date	Pollster	Correa	Gutiérrez	Noboa	Roldós	Sagñay	Jácome	Delgado	Gonzáles
02/08/08	S.P.Investigaciones	38%	6%	6%	–	–	–	–	–
23/01/09	Informe Confidencial	54%	8%	–	5%	–	–	–	–
21/02/09	S.P.Investigaciones	54%	11%	13%	5%	–	–	–	–
28/02/09	Perfiles de Opinión	48%	9.5%	11.5%	4%	–	–	–	–
28/02/09	Informe Confidencial	47.5%	5.5%	12.5%	6%	–	–	–	–
01/03/09	CMS	47.41%	5.82%	4.81%	1.84%	–	–	–	–
08/03/09	Informe Confidencial	48%	9%	10%	–	–	–	–	–
10/03/09	Informe Confidencial	47.5%	–	12.5%	–	–	–	–	–
09/03/09	S.P.Investigaciones	50%	13%	11%	5%	–	–	–	–
15/03/09	Perfiles de Opinión	47%	10%	13%	8%	–	–	–	–
15/03/09	S.P.Investigaciones	54%	11%	13%	5%	–	–	–	–
15/03/09	CEDATOS	46%	11%	14%	4%	0.2%	0.1%	0.5%	0.3%
16/03/09	S.P.Investigaciones	53%	13%	11%	5%	–	–	–	–
21/03/09	S.P.Investigaciones	52%	12%	11%	8%	–	–	–	–
22/03/09	Informe Confidencial	48%	7.5%	15%	–	–	–	–	–
23/03/09	Perfiles de Opinión	47.5%	7%	16%	10%	–	–	–	–
25/03/09	CMS	55%	–	13%	–	–	–	–	–
27/03/09	CEDATOS	48.5%	14.6%	12.9%	7.1%	0.2%	0.2%	0.4%	0.3%
28/03/09	CMS	52%	9%	8%	–	–	–	–	–
28/03/09	S.P.Investigaciones	53%	12%	12%	6%	–	–	–	–
30/03/09	Informe Confidencial	48%	9%	10%	5%	–	–	–	–
03/04/09	CEDATOS	49.2%	15.3%	13.2%	7.2%	0.3%	0.2%	0.6%	0.5%
03/04/09	S.P.Investigaciones	53.7%	12.4%	10.1%	6.5%	–	–	–	–
06/04/09	Market	57.5%	12.7%	13.5%	6%	–	–	–	–
06/04/09	S.P.Investigaciones	51%	13%	12%	9%	–	–	–	–
06/04/09	CMS	47.6%	15%	8.6%	6.4%	–	–	–	–
06/04/09	CEDATOS	50.5%	17.7%	15.3%	8.3%	0.3%	0.2%	0.7%	0.6%
26/04/09	CEDATOS	55.2%	27.7%	10.2%	3.4%	–	–	–	–
26/04/09	S.P.Investigaciones	56%	29%	8%	4%	–	–	–	–
26/04/09	CMS	54.92%	23.74%	7.74%	6%	–	–	–	–

== Results ==
=== President ===
Candidate	Running mate	Party	Votes	%
Rafael Correa	Lenín Moreno	PAIS Alliance	3,586,439	51.99
Lucio Gutiérrez	Felipe Mantilla	January 21 Patriotic Society Party	1,947,830	28.24
Álvaro Noboa	Annabella Azín	Institutional Renewal Party of National Action	786,718	11.41
Martha Roldós	Eduardo Delgado	Ethics and Democracy Network	298,765	4.33
Carlos Sagñay	Segundo Bueno	Thousandfold Victory	108,079	1.57
Melba Jácome	Ricardo Guambo	Fertile Earth Movement	93,146	1.35
Diego Delgado Jara	Ménthor Sánchez	Social Integration and Transformation	43,221	0.63
Carlos Gonzáles	Julio Prócel	Independent Just and Solidary Movement	33,714	0.49
Total			6,897,912	100.00
Valid votes			6,897,912	87.00
Invalid/blank votes			1,030,836	13.00
Total votes			7,928,748	100.00
Registered voters/turnout			10,532,234	75.28
Source: CNE

=== National Assembly ===
Party	Votes	%	Seats				
Party	Votes	%	National	Provincial	Overseas	Total	+/–
PAIS Alliance	27,751,651	43.05	7	47	5	59	–21
January 21 Patriotic Society Party	9,779,869	15.17	3	16	0	19	0
Social Christian Party	8,559,831	13.28	2	9	0	11	+6
Institutional Renewal Party of National Action	3,875,395	6.01	1	5	1	7	–1
Ecuadorian Roldosist Party	2,872,465	4.46	1	2	0	3	+2
Democratic People's Movement	2,766,276	4.29	1	4	0	5	+1
Ethics and Democracy Network	1,350,937	2.10	0	0	0	0	–3
National Democratic Coalition	1,341,635	2.08	0	1	0	1	+1
Municipalist Movement for National Integrity	1,246,643	1.93	0	5	0	5	New
Democratic Left	1,108,744	1.72	0	2	0	2	0
Pachakutik Plurinational Unity Movement – New Country	948,638	1.47	0	4	0	4	0
Christian Democratic Union	732,287	1.14	0	0	0	0	0
Fertile Earth Movement	619,766	0.96	0	0	0	0	New
National Agreement	482,598	0.75	0	0	0	0	0
Social Integration and Transformation	288,698	0.45	0	0	0	0	0
Thousandfold Victory	283,124	0.44	0	0	0	0	0
Independent Just and Solidary Movement	256,805	0.40	0	0	0	0	0
National Movement for Social Reconciliation	198,630	0.31	0	0	0	0	0
Independents and regionalists			0	8	0	8	7
Total	64,463,992	100.00	15	103	6	124	–6
Source: CNE

=== Andean Parliament ===
Party	Votes	%	Seats
PAIS Alliance	11,897,690	45.00	3
January 21 Patriotic Society Party	3,564,315	13.48	1
Social Christian party	3,082,565	11.66	1
Municipalist Movement for National Integrity	1,625,670	6.15	0
Democratic People's Movement	1,228,310	4.65	0
Institutional Renewal Party of National Action	908,520	3.44	0
Pachakutik Plurinational Unity Movement – New Country	817,100	3.09	0
Ecuadorian Roldosist Party	731,895	2.77	0
Democratic Left	701,445	2.65	0
Ethics and Democracy Network	353,565	1.34	0
A New Option	268,880	1.02	0
Christian Democratic Union	246,710	0.93	0
Socialist Party – Broad Front of Ecuador	212,355	0.80	0
National Agreement	134,895	0.51	0
National Democratic Coalition	125,410	0.47	0
Ecuadorian White Movement for the Vindication of the Poor	98,255	0.37	0
Fertile Earth Movement	88,855	0.34	0
Social Integration and Transformation	83,780	0.32	0
Thousandfold Victory	69,305	0.26	0
National Movement for Social Reconciliation	58,130	0.22	0
Independent Just and Solidary Movement	51,915	0.20	0
MCN	47,060	0.18	0
Movement for National Honesty	41,565	0.16	0
Total	26,438,190	100.00	5
Source: CNE
