= Guaranda =

- City
- Guaranda
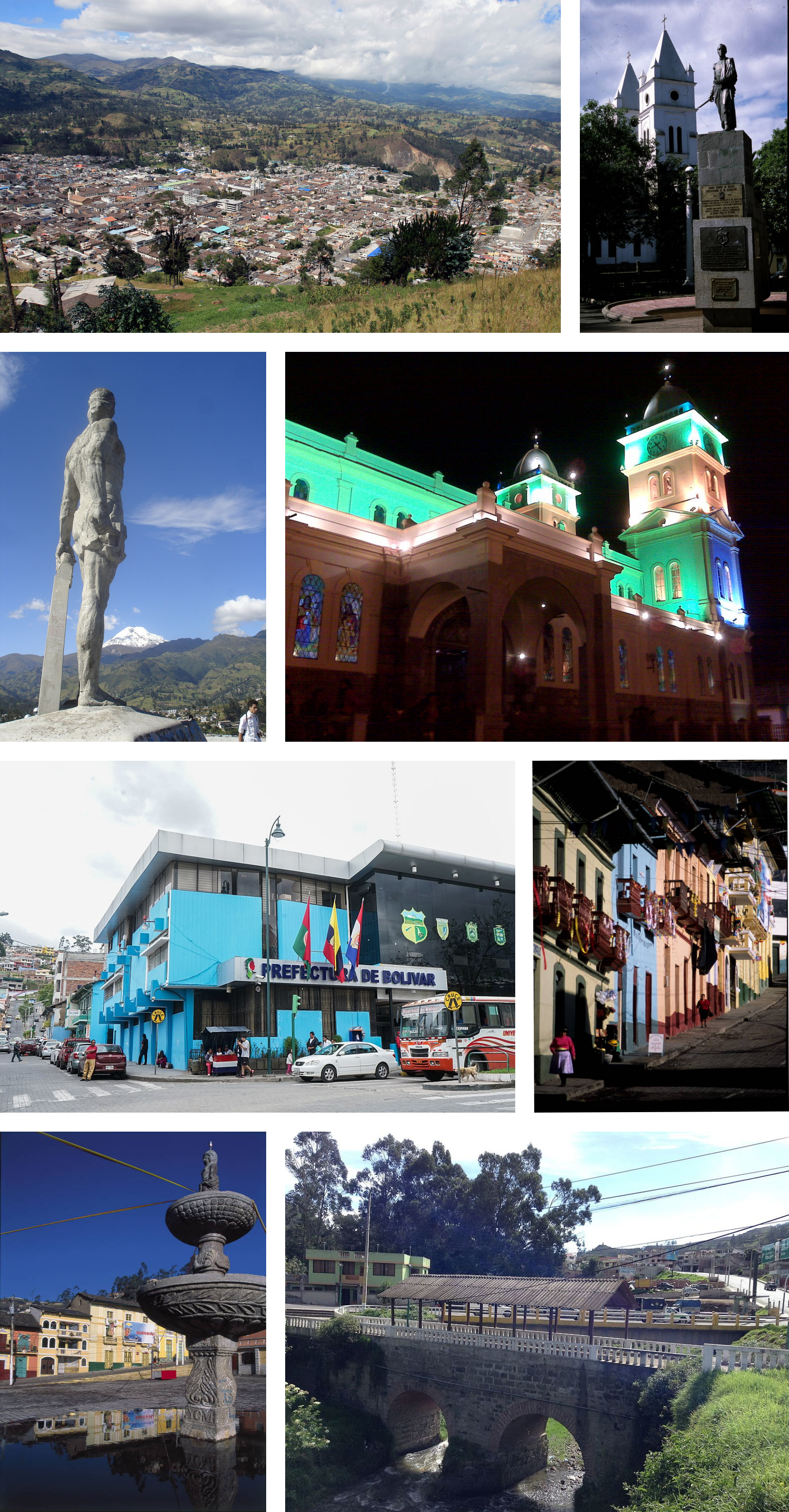
- From top, left to right: Panoramic view of the city, monument to Simon Bolivar behind St. Peter Cathedral, monument to Guaranga, St. Peter of Guanujo Sanctuary, Prefecture of Bolívar, May 7th Street, May 15th Square and bridge over the Culebrillas River.

- Flag
- Nickname: "The City of the Seven Hills"
- Location within Ecuador
- Coordinates: 1°36′S 79°0′W
- Country: Ecuador
- Province: Bolívar
- Canton: Guaranda Canton

Government
  - Mayor: Inti Yumbay

Area
  - City: 8.25 km^{2} (3.19 sq mi)
- Elevation: 2,668 m (8,753 ft)

Population (2022 census)
  - City: 30,755
  - Density: 3,730/km^{2} (9,660/sq mi)
- Time zone: UTC-5 (ECT)
- Climate: Cwb
- Website: www.guaranda.gob.ec (in Spanish)

Guaranda (Spanish pronunciation: [ɡwaˈɾanda]) is a city in central Ecuador. It is the capital of Bolívar province located in the Andes Mountains. The city is connected by road with other hubs, including Riobamba, Babahoyo and Ambato.

Guaranda is a market town located in a valle – a deep valley in the high Andes, serving a vast hinterland of agricultural settlements ("comunidades") peopled by Quechua Indians. Its climate is subtropical, with a long (May – October) dry season ("estio"). Its population is mainly mestizo, but includes many people of different ethnicities. This nucleus has been intermarrying for almost five centuries, forming a compact population linked by family connections. Since the 1990s, the indigenous majority has seized political power and most of the local elected officers are of Quechua origin.

The city has a population of 30,755 (2022 census) and is growing. It has severe electrical and water supply problems. Water is drawn from high surface sources, mostly from the Chimborazo glacier, and is of good drinking quality. The city is also known for its week-long carnival and for its "Pajaro Azul" alcoholic drink.

== History ==
The city was founded by Spanish explorers in 1571 and officially recognized on November 11, 1811. It celebrates its independence day on November 10, commemorating the day the city definitively declared its independence from the Spanish.

Guaranda weathered earthquakes in 1674 and 1775, sustaining significant damage, but rebuilding both times. After the 1775 earthquake, it took almost four years to rebuild the city.

The city was declared an official Ecuadorian cultural center on October 23, 1997, reflecting the historic architecture of the urban center.

== Geography ==
Like Rome, Guaranda is built upon seven hills. It lies at an altitude of about 2,668 metres (8,753 feet). From the city, Chimborazo is in view most days.

The downtown area is situated around Parque Libertador Simon Bolivar, named for the heroic liberator, Simon Bolivar. In the park, a statue of Bolivar designed by famous Ecuadorian artist Oswaldo Guayasamín can be found.

== Climate ==
Climate data for Guaranda (San Simón), elevation 2,600 m (8,500 ft), (1971–2000)
Month	Jan	Feb	Mar	Apr	May	Jun	Jul	Aug	Sep	Oct	Nov	Dec	Year
Mean daily maximum °C (°F)	18.9 (66.0)	18.9 (66.0)	18.6 (65.5)	19.0 (66.2)	19.4 (66.9)	19.8 (67.6)	21.0 (69.8)	21.3 (70.3)	21.3 (70.3)	20.8 (69.4)	20.6 (69.1)	20.1 (68.2)	20.0 (67.9)
Mean daily minimum °C (°F)	9.0 (48.2)	9.4 (48.9)	9.2 (48.6)	9.2 (48.6)	8.6 (47.5)	7.5 (45.5)	6.2 (43.2)	6.2 (43.2)	7.1 (44.8)	8.0 (46.4)	8.2 (46.8)	8.1 (46.6)	8.1 (46.5)
Average precipitation mm (inches)	41.0 (1.61)	79.0 (3.11)	90.0 (3.54)	94.0 (3.70)	58.0 (2.28)	44.0 (1.73)	15.0 (0.59)	26.0 (1.02)	45.0 (1.77)	81.0 (3.19)	68.0 (2.68)	49.0 (1.93)	690 (27.15)
Average relative humidity (%)	84	85	84	84	84	81	76	73	78	79	77	80	80
Source: FAO

== Parishes ==
Guaranda, including urban and rural area, has around 65,000 parishioners in eleven parishes.

=== Urban ===
- Angel Polibio Chávez
- Gabriel Ignacio Veintimilla
- Guanujo

=== Rural ===
- Facundo Vela
- Julio Moreno
- Salinas
- San Lorenzo
- San Luís de Pambil
- San Simón
- Santa Fé
- Simiatug

== Sister cities ==
- Haeju, North Korea
- Johnson City, Tennessee, United States
