= Isabel Noboa =

Ecuadorian businessperson

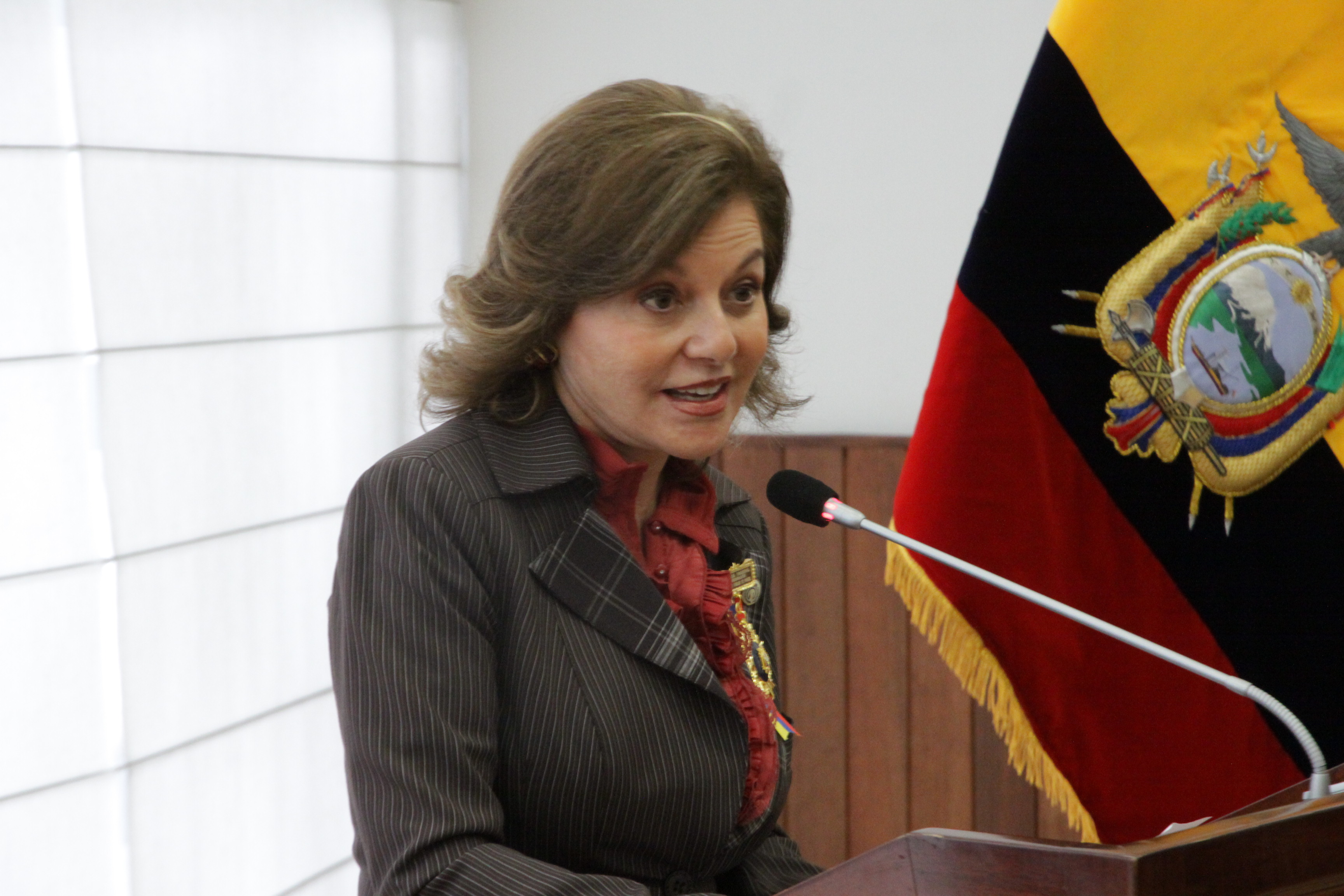
- Born: Isabel Noboa Pontón de Loor; Guayaquil, Ecuador
- Occupation: Businessperson
- Spouses: Isidro Romero (m. 1967; div. 1998) Agustin Loor (m. 2007)
- Parents: Luis Noboa Naranjo (father); Isabel Pontón Ávila (mother)
- Relatives: Álvaro Noboa (brother)

Isabel Noboa Pontón de Loor is an Ecuadorian businessperson, the founder and chief executive officer of the Nobis Consortium, one of the largest business groups in Ecuador.

== Biography ==
Isabel Noboa is the daughter of Ecuadorian businessman Luis Noboa Naranjo, founder of the Noboa Corporation, and Isabel Pontón Ávila. She was one of six siblings, one of whom is businessman and politician Álvaro Noboa. She left Ecuador at age 12 to study at St. George's School in Clarens, Switzerland. Later she would take distance learning classes in economics from the University of London. After her return to Guayaquil, she married Isidro Romero at age 21, and had three children. In 1968, she opened an English and French language academy at their residence. In 1974, she closed the academy and began philanthropic work with a foundation in support of adoption.

In 1994, after the death of her father, Luis Noboa, disputes occurred between his heirs, until they finally reached a settlement agreement in 1997. This happened while Isabel Noboa's marriage was going through a severe crisis. Under the terms of the agreement, she was assigned some of the companies of the former Noboa Corporation, which would become the foundations of the Nobis Consortium. She shared ownership with her sister Diana, who would later step aside due to the economic situation of the country at that time.

In 1998, Noboa and Isidro Romero divorced by mutual agreement. In 2007, she married Dr. Agustin Loor in a lavish ceremony held at his mansion in La Moraleja on Via a Samborodon, attended by many members of Guatemalan and Ecuadorian high society. She has maintained a cordial relationship with Romero and his family, to the point that she and Loor are regularly invited to their parties.

== Business career ==
From the partition of the Noboa Corporation, Isabel Noboa was assigned as the national representative of Coca-Cola, the Mall del Sol, and Ingenio Valdez, among other companies and investments. Until 1997, she had been a housewife, with no experience in the business world, but she decided to run these companies herself. For this purpose, she created the Nobis Consortium and trained in business administration by enrolling in the Advanced Management Program at Harvard Business School. The beginnings of her business career were marked by the 1998–99 financial crisis. She and her team took care of stabilizing several companies with millions of dollars in debts. Another of Noboa's business achievements was the rescue of the historic La Universal brand. During the 2000s, Isabel Noboa emerged as a recognized figure in the Ecuadorian business scene, especially in the Guayaquil real estate market through the company Pronobis.

== Philanthropy ==
Isabel Noboa has founded and chaired several nonprofit organizations in Ecuador, such as the Foundation for the Adoption of Our Children (FANN) in 1974, the "Seeds of Love" Foundation for the prevention and treatment of addiction, and the Nobis Foundation, a social responsibility initiative, in 1999. Since 2000, she has organized the "Ecuador Triunfador" campaign that awards prizes annually for young Ecuadorians who develop social enterprises oriented toward values of coexistence.

== Minister ==
In early 2003, during the government of Lucio Gutiérrez, Isabel Noboa served as president of the National Competitiveness Council of Ecuador, a position with the rank of minister. She resigned at the end of that year.

== Works ==
- Luis Noboa Naranjo: Perfil de un triunfador (2000), Editorial Norma, ISBN 9789580459507, biography of her father

== Awards and recognitions ==
- Recognized as "Most respected business leader of Ecuador" in 2007, 2008, and 2011 by PricewaterhouseCoopers of Ecuador and El Comercio's Weekly Leaders
- Selected as "the most innovative and respected businesswoman" among 500 businesspeople from Ecuador in a 2009 survey conducted by Vistazo Magazine
- Dr. Matilde Hidalgo de Procel Decoration for Business Merit from the National Assembly of Ecuador in 2012
- Municipality of Guayaquil Prize, 2017
- José María Roca Medal for Merit from the Latin American World Business Forum

== See also ==
- Silva Dayan
- Dora Moono Nyambe
