= Annabella Azín =

Ecuadorian politician (born 1961)

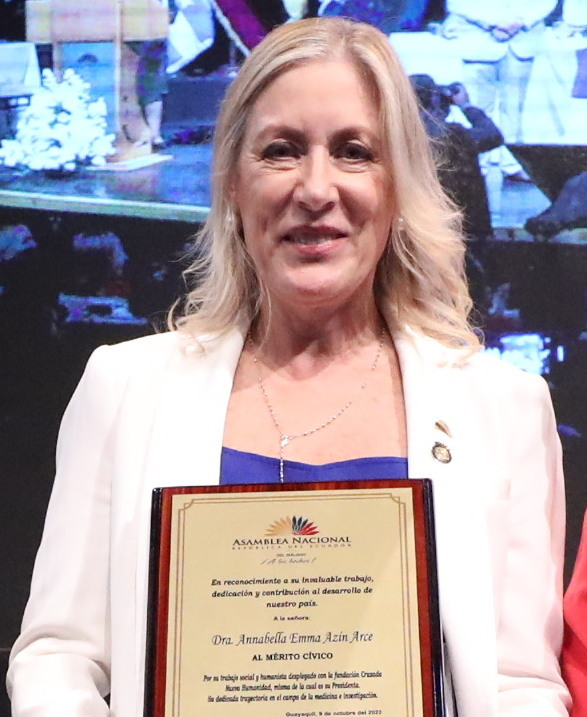
- Azín in 2022

Member of the National Assembly of Ecuador
- Incumbent
- Assumed office 14 May 2025
- Constituency: National constituency

Member of the Constituent Assembly of Ecuador from the Guayas Province
- In office 29 November 2007 – 25 October 2008

Member of the National Congress of Ecuador from the Guayas Province
- In office 5 January 2007 – 29 November 2007

Personal details
- Born: Annabella Emma Azín Arce; 30 May 1961 (age 65) Guayaquil, Ecuador
- Party: National Democratic Action (since 2024)
- Other political affiliations: Institutional Renewal Party of National Action (2002–2014)
- Spouse: Álvaro Noboa
- Children: 4; including Daniel
- Occupation: Politician, activist, and physician

Annabella Emma Azín Arce (born 30 May 1961) is an Ecuadorian politician, activist and physician who has been a member of the National Assembly of Ecuador, having been elected in 2025. She is the wife of Álvaro Noboa and the mother of President Daniel Noboa.

Azín is president of the Crusade for a New Humanity Foundation, caring for those afflicted by disease for over 20 years. Azín was her husband's running mate during his two unsuccessful presidential campaigns in 2009 and 2013.

== Personal life ==
Azín was born on 30 May 1961. She is the eldest of three daughters born to Giorgio Azín Della Volpe and Grecia Arce Paulson. She earned a doctorate in medicine from the Catholic University of Santiago de Guayaquil.

Her son, Daniel Noboa, was elected the youngest-ever President of Ecuador in the 2023 general election.

== Career ==
Azín hosted Ecuador Fashion Week on 17 September 2015. She accepted the invitation of Cecilia Niemes, director of Ecuador Fashion Week, to host the venue after Azín completed her master's degree. She participated in protest marches against the government of Rafael Correa.

Azín has campaigned for the creation of a successor to the political party PRIAN.

Azín was a member of the National Congress of Ecuador for Guayas Province and a member of the Ecuadorian Constituent Assembly, both times representing the Institutional Renewal Party of National Action between 2007 and 2008. She was a binomial candidate for the office of Vice President of Ecuador with her husband in the Ecuadorian presidential elections of 2009 and 2013.

On 9 October 2022, she was given a national award by Virgilio Saquicela and Marcela Holguín. The award was for the Crusade for a New Humanity Foundation, which she chairs.

In February 2025, Azín joined the National Assembly during the 2025 election. She was on the party's national list which included Sade Fritschi and Diana Jácome.
