= 2013 Ecuadorian general election =

- 17 February 2013
- Presidential election
- Registered: 11,675,441
- Turnout: 81.07%
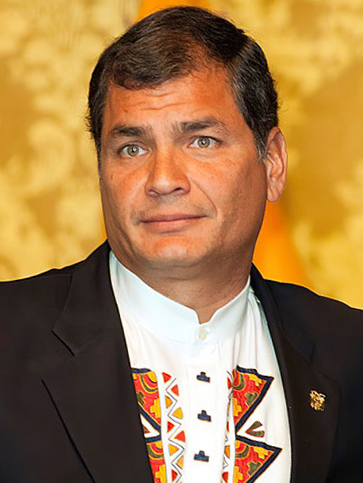

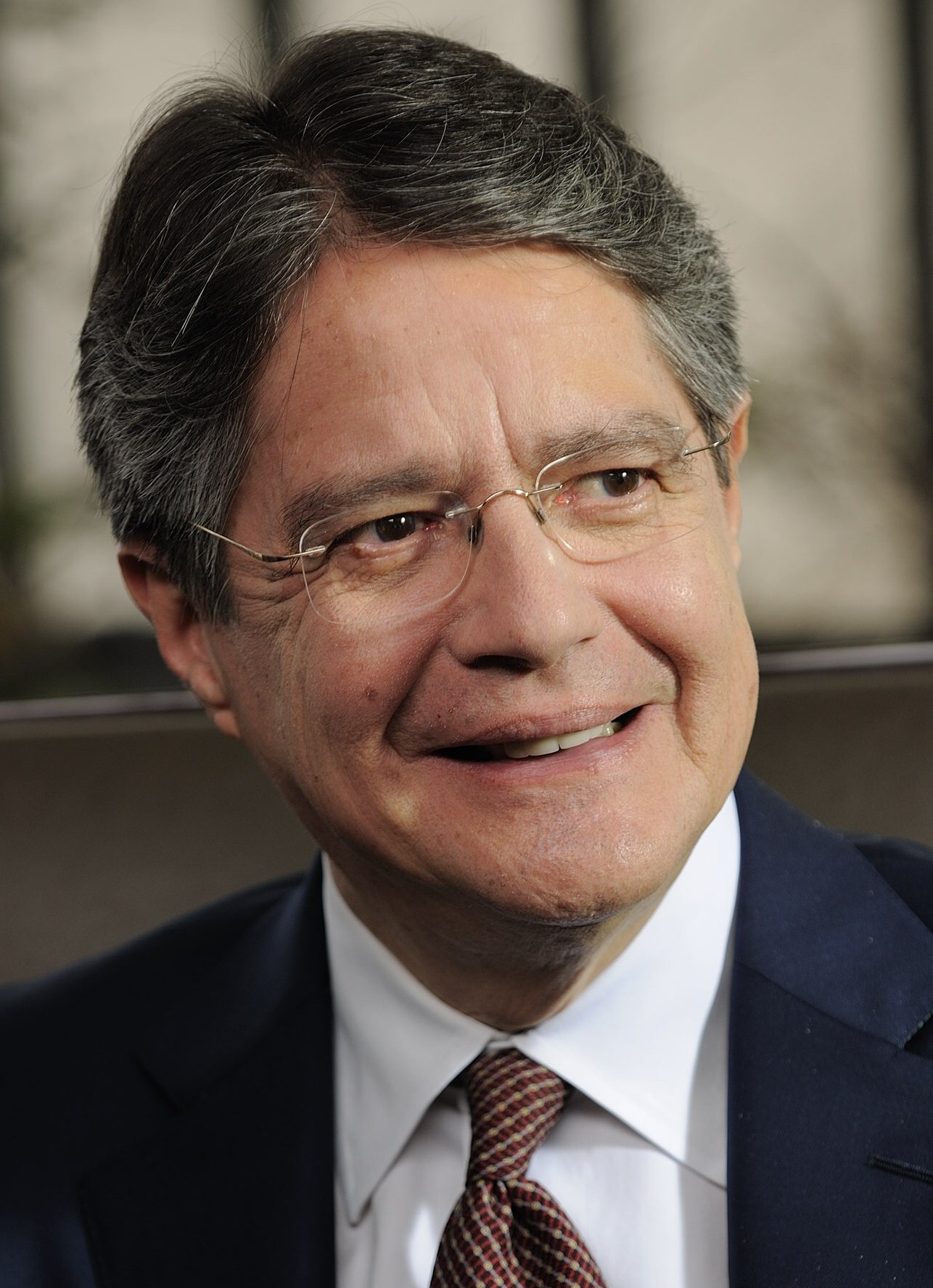

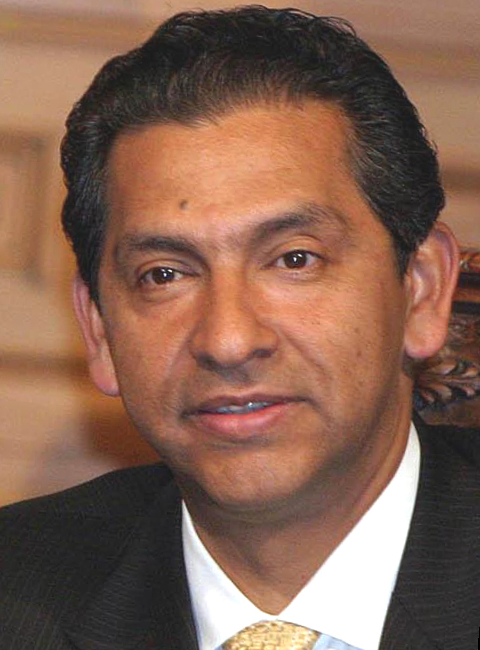
Nominee	Rafael Correa	Guillermo Lasso	Lucio Gutiérrez
Party	PAIS Alliance	CREO	PSP
Running mate	Jorge Glas	Juan Carlos Solines	Pearl Boyes Fuller
Popular vote	4,918,482	1,951,102	578,875
Percentage	57.17%	22.68%	6.73%
- Results by province
President before election
Rafael Correa
PAIS Alliance
Elected President
Rafael Correa
PAIS Alliance

General elections were held in Ecuador on 17 February 2013 to elect the President, the National Assembly, Provincial Assemblies and members of the Andean Parliament. The incumbent President Rafael Correa was re-elected by a wide margin. Correa's closest electoral rival, Guillermo Lasso, conceded the election shortly after it concluded.

The vote had been set for January 2013, but was put back a month to allow a full year to elapse after the reform of election rules.

This was the first election since 1996 held after the natural expiration of a four-year presidential term. This was due to a decade of political and economical instability that Ecuador experienced after Abdalá Bucaram was impeached by the former Congress, in late 1997, and that lasted until Correa's inauguration in early 2007.

== Background ==
The call for general elections occurred on 18 October 2012. The election campaigns were officially launched on 4 January and ended on 14 February, as announced by CNE member Juan Pablo Pozo.

Voters chose the president and vice president of the Republic, as well as national and provincial assembly members, members of the Andean Parliament, mayors, prefects, and other sectional officials.

The seated President Correa, a two-term incumbent, is credited with bringing stability and prosperity to Ecuador's nearly 15 million people. A staunch friend of Venezuela's Hugo Chavez, he is usually described as "leftist" and "socialist." He is committed to poverty reduction through not just economic growth, but redistribution of wealth as well. As he told the CELAC Summit in 2015: "For the first time in the history of humanity this poverty is no longer due to a lack of resources, but rather is the fruit of inequality, and this, in turn, the product of perverse relations of power, where few have it all and many have nothing at all.” This approach has generated fervent support as well as hostility from wealthy sectors in Ecuador; for example, his land reform policies for giving unproductive land to poor peasants has worried agribusiness, particularly the large flower and banana producers. He has vastly expanded the number of workers on the public sector and made health and education free for all Ecuadorians. Some have argued that Correa has clamped down on dissent in the country's news media, although journalists in Ecuador are not risking their lives as they are in other countries of the region. His government has run record-high deficits. In 2009, Correa became the first president of Ecuador to win re-election in nearly a half-century.

=== Democracy Code ===
In late 2012, Ecuador's Constitutional Court (CC) ruled on the adoption of the Democracy Code by a 6 to 3 vote in favor. The new resolution made the D'Hondt method of voting constitutional; therefore it was applied in the 2013 elections. The resolution also states that legal restrictions on the work of journalists during elections are unconstitutional.

== Presidential elections ==
=== Candidates ===
Eight presidential candidates were registered in the National Electoral Council. The candidates were: Rafael Correa of the PAIS Alliance movement, Guillermo Lasso of the Creating Opportunities movement, Lucio Gutiérrez of the PSP party, Alberto Acosta Espinoza, candidate of the Coordinating Committee of the Left, Norman Wray, of the Ruptura 25 movement, Nelson Zavala, of the Roldosist Party, Mauricio Rodas, of the SUMA movement, and Álvaro Noboa, of PRIAN.

=== Restrictions of the candidate's qualifications ===
The National Electoral Council (Spanish-language initials, CNE) approved the regulations for the registration and qualification of candidates running for President, Vice President, Assembly and the Andean Parliament for the election. The regulations established that candidates who have contracts with the State or have received final judgments for offenses penalized with imprisonment such as bribery, illicit enrichment and embezzlement, would not be allowed to participate.

== Parliamentary elections ==
Ecuadorians not only voted on 17 February for their president and vice-president, but as well as for 137 members of the national assembly; drawn from provinces, a national list, and six migrant spots, and for their five Andean Parliament representatives.

== Opinion polls ==
Surveys generally attributed between 50% and 60% of the votes to President Correa. The seven other candidates lagged far behind; Correa's nearest rival, Guillermo Lasso, was credited with 10—20% of the vote.

Date	Institute	Correa	Lasso	Gutiérrez	Acosta	Noboa	Rodas	Wray	Zavala
03/08/10	CEDATOS	38%	–	19%	–	2.9%	–	–	–
22/10/11	CEDATOS	40%	2.6%	5%	–	3.1%	–	–	–
13/11/11	Perfiles de Opinión	48.9%	–	3.5%	6.9%	3.6%	–	–	–
16/03/12	CMS	48.56%	4.60%	8.09%	–	6.98%	0.52%	–	–
14/04/12	Opinión Pública	39%	–	6%	–	3%	–	–	–
29/04/12	Perfiles de Opinión	50%	1%	4%	4%	3%	–	–	–
31/05/12	Perfiles de Opinión	52%	6%	3%	2%	4%	1%	–	–
15/07/12	Informe Confidencial	50%	17%	8%	3%	4%	1%	–	–
04/08/12	Opinión Pública	43%	7%	5%	2%	4%	–	–	–
05/08/12	Perfiles de Opinión	53.4%	14.4%	3.3%	4.9%	6.7%	–	–	–
16/08/12	CMS	41.75%	15.82%	8.22%	6.55%	5.72%	–	–	–
18/08/12	Opinión Pública	44%	8%	4%	2%	3%	–	–	–
27/08/12	CEDATOS	38%	11%	6%	4%	3%	–	–	–
08/09/12	Opinión Pública	44%	9%	5%	2%	2%	0%	–	–
16/09/12	Informe Confidencial	48%	18%	8%	5%	4%	–	–	–
18/09/12	CMS	48%	10%	6%	–	2%	–	–	–
26/09/12	Perfiles de Opinión	55.5%	11.4%	6.5%	3.8%	2.7%	0.2%	–	–
30/09/12	Perfiles de Opinión	61.7%	12.6%	3.6%	2.6%	1.8%	–	–	–
07/10/12	CEDATOS	44%	18%	6.9%	6.5%	2.3%	–	–	–
09/10/12	CMS	47.08%	11.03%	3.43%	4.54%	2.57%	–	–	–
15/10/12	CIEES	51%	13%	8%	7%	5%	1%	–	–
22/10/12	Market	38%	24%	11%	3%	4%	–	–	–
27/10/12	Opinión Pública	54%	16%	5%	4%	–	–	–	–
30/10/12	Market	40.20%	23.19%	15.02%	6.40%	4.31%	–	–	–
31/10/12	CEDATOS	46%	19%	8%	7%	2%	–	–	–
10/11/12	Opinión Pública	50.5%	15.2%	4.6%	3.2%	2.4%	0.3%	0.1%	–
14/11/12	Market	39%	25%	13%	6%	2%	–	–	–
19/11/12	Perfiles de Opinión	56%	15%	7%	4%	3%	–	–	–
28/11/12	Opinión Pública	51.2%	14.9%	5.4%	3.7%	1.8%	0.4%	0.3%	0.1%
29/11/12	CEDATOS	53%	22%	10%	8%	2%	1%	2%	2%
01/12/12	Opinión Pública	51.2%	13.8%	3.1%	4.7%	2.2%	0.5%	0.4%	0.4%
14/12/12	Perfiles de Opinión	62.8%	10.7%	4.1%	2.8%	2.1%	0.2%	0.3%	0.2%
15/12/12	Opinión Pública	51.2%	14.7%	6%	3.5%	3.6%	0.7%	0.9%	0.2%
21/12/12	Perfiles de Opinión	60.6%	11.2%	4.5%	3.5%	1.8%	0.3%	0.2%	0.2%
06/01/13	CIEES	53.3%	14.95%	8.85%	2.4%	8.45%	0.55%	0.2%	0.35%
10/01/13	Opinión Pública	56.7%	12.1%	4.4%	3.4%	2%	0.5%	0.3%	0.6%
13/01/13	CMS	47.65%	7.98%	1.44%	1.57%	0.80%	0.42%	0.40%	0.34%
18/01/13	Market	49%	18%	12%	6%	4%	1%	2%	2%
23/01/13	Perfiles de Opinión	63%	9%	4%	2%	2%	1%	1%	1%
26/01/13	Opinión Pública	55.9%	12.9%	5.2%	4.4%	2.3%	1.9%	1.3%	0.6%
02/02/13	CIEES	53.1%	19.5%	6.9%	5.2%	4.3%	2.1%	2.7%	3%
05/02/13	El Comercio ARCOP	37.5%	29.5%	6.5%	4.5%	2%	1.5%	0%	1%
06/02/13	CMS	48.18%	9.98%	2.05%	1.87%	0.85%	1.36%	0.53%	0.36%
07/02/13	Perfiles de Opinión	61.5%	9.2%	3.8%	2.5%	1.6%	1.3%	0.6%	0.6%
16/02/13	Market	64.1%	16.4%	7.3%	4.5%	3.6%	2.5%	0.8%	0.9%
17/02/13	CEDATOS	61.5%	20.9%	6.0%	2.9%	3.5%	3.1%	1.0%	1.1%
17/02/13	CIEES	58.8%	23.1%	5.5%	3.0%	3.6%	3.3%	1.4%	1.3%

== Results ==
=== President ===
Candidate	Running mate	Party	Votes	%
Rafael Correa	Jorge Glas	PAIS Alliance	4,918,482	57.17
Guillermo Lasso	Juan Carlos Solines	Creating Opportunities	1,951,102	22.68
Lucio Gutiérrez	Pearl Boyes Fuller	Patriotic Society Party	578,875	6.73
Mauricio Rodas	Inés Manzano	SUMA Party	335,532	3.90
Álvaro Noboa	Anabella Azín	Institutional Renewal Party of National Action	319,956	3.72
Alberto Acosta Espinosa	Marcia Caicedo	Plurinational Unity of the Lefts	280,539	3.26
Norman Wray	Ángela Mendoza	Ruptura 25	112,525	1.31
Nelson Zavala	Denny Cevallos	Ecuadorian Roldosist Party	105,592	1.23
Total			8,602,603	100.00
Valid votes			8,602,603	90.88
Invalid/blank votes			863,257	9.12
Total votes			9,465,860	100.00
Registered voters/turnout			11,675,441	81.07
Source: CNE

=== National Assembly ===
Party	Votes	%	Seats				
Party	Votes	%	National	Provincial	Overseas	Total	+/–
PAIS Alliance	45,955,995	52.30	8	86	6	100	+41
Creating Opportunities	10,032,804	11.42	2	9	0	11	New
Social Christian Party	7,901,315	8.99	1	5	0	6	–5
January 21 Patriotic Society Party	4,955,320	5.64	1	4	0	5	–14
Plurinational Unity of the Lefts	4,151,000	4.72	1	4	0	5	–4
Ecuadorian Roldosist Party	3,960,188	4.51	1	0	0	1	–2
SUMA Party	2,829,034	3.22	1	0	0	1	New
Institutional Renewal Party of National Action	2,640,181	3.00	0	0	0	0	–7
Advance	2,568,156	2.92	0	5	0	5	New
Ruptura 25	2,179,383	2.48	0	0	0	0	New
Socialist Party – Broad Front of Ecuador	698,829	0.80	0	0	0	0	–1
Independents and regionalists			–	3	0	3	–
Total	87,872,205	100.00	15	116	6	137	0
Valid votes	7,359,921	77.93					
Invalid/blank votes	2,083,795	22.07					
Total votes	9,443,716	100.00					
Registered voters/turnout	11,675,441	80.89					
Source: CNE

=== Andean Parliament ===
Party	Votes	%	Seats
PAIS Alliance	15,806,821	52.97	4
Creating Opportunities	4,350,969	14.58	1
Social Christian Party	2,271,754	7.61	0
Patriotic Society Party	1,886,932	6.32	0
Plurinational Unity of the Lefts	1,496,165	5.01	0
Institutional Renewal Party of National Action	1,241,503	4.16	0
Advance	1,096,088	3.67	0
Ecuadorian Roldosist Party	937,878	3.14	0
Ruptura 25	754,041	2.53	0
Total	29,842,151	100.00	5
Valid votes	7,159,457	75.63	
Invalid/blank votes	2,306,374	24.37	
Total votes	9,465,831	100.00	
Registered voters/turnout	11,675,441	81.07	
Source: CNE

== Reactions ==
Banker Guillermo Lasso, the runner-up in the vote, conceded his defeat in broad terms, by stating: “I recognise the triumph of President Correa.” Thousands of Correa's backers celebrated in Quito's main square just after the polls closed. Speaking from the balcony of the Presidential Palace, Correa thanked them for their "immense trust.”
