= Luis Macas =

Ecuadorian Indigenous leader

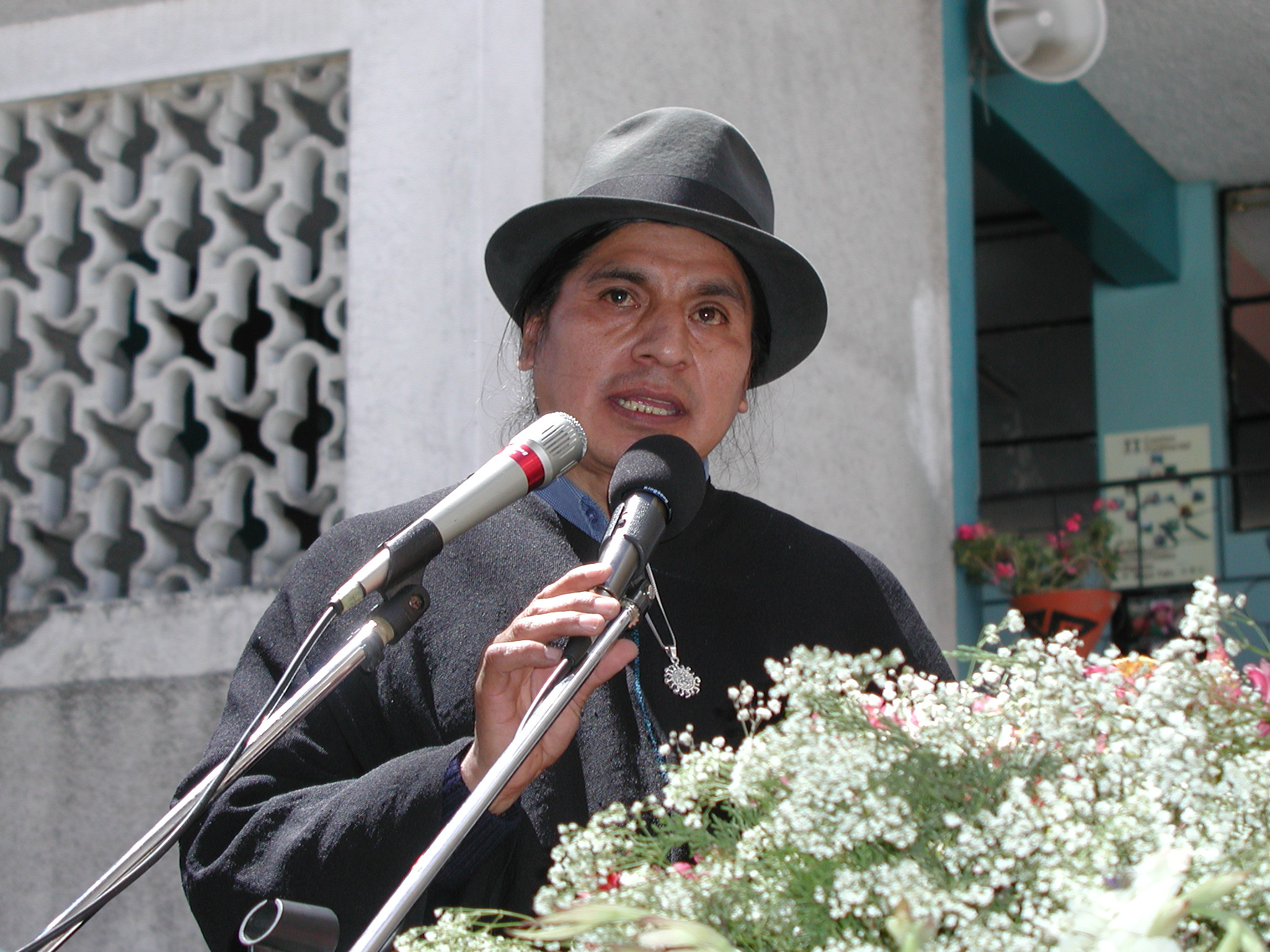
Luis Macas.

Luis Macas Ambuludí (born 1951) is a Kichwa politician and intellectual from Saraguro, Ecuador.

Macas has honorary university degrees in anthropology, linguistics and jurisprudence. He was one of the founders of the CONAIE and of the Pachakutik Movement, and was member of the National Congress of Ecuador. In 2003 he joined Lucio Gutiérrez's government as Minister of Agriculture, quit because of disagreements with his neoliberal policies.

Macas was vice-president of the CONAIE (Confederación de Nacionalidades Indígenas de Ecuador) from 1988 to 1991, and CONAIE president from 1991 to 1996 and from 2004–2008.

On May 24, 2006 Macas was proclaimed by the Pachakutik Movement as presidential candidate for the October 15, 2006 election. He came in seventh (out of 13 candidates), with just over 2 percent of the vote.
