= Caluma =

- Town
- Location within Ecuador
- Coordinates: 1°38′S 79°15′W
- Country: Ecuador
- Province: Bolívar Province
- Canton: Caluma Canton

Government
  - Mayor: Ángel Ufredo Suárez García

Area
  - Town: 1.96 km^{2} (0.76 sq mi)

Population (2022 census)
  - Town: 7,884
  - Density: 4,020/km^{2} (10,400/sq mi)
- Time zone: ECT
- Climate: Am
- Website: municipiocaluma.gov.

Caluma is a town in the Bolívar Province, Ecuador. It is the seat of the Caluma Canton.
