= Salinas de Guaranda =

Coordinates: 1.4000°S 79.0167°W

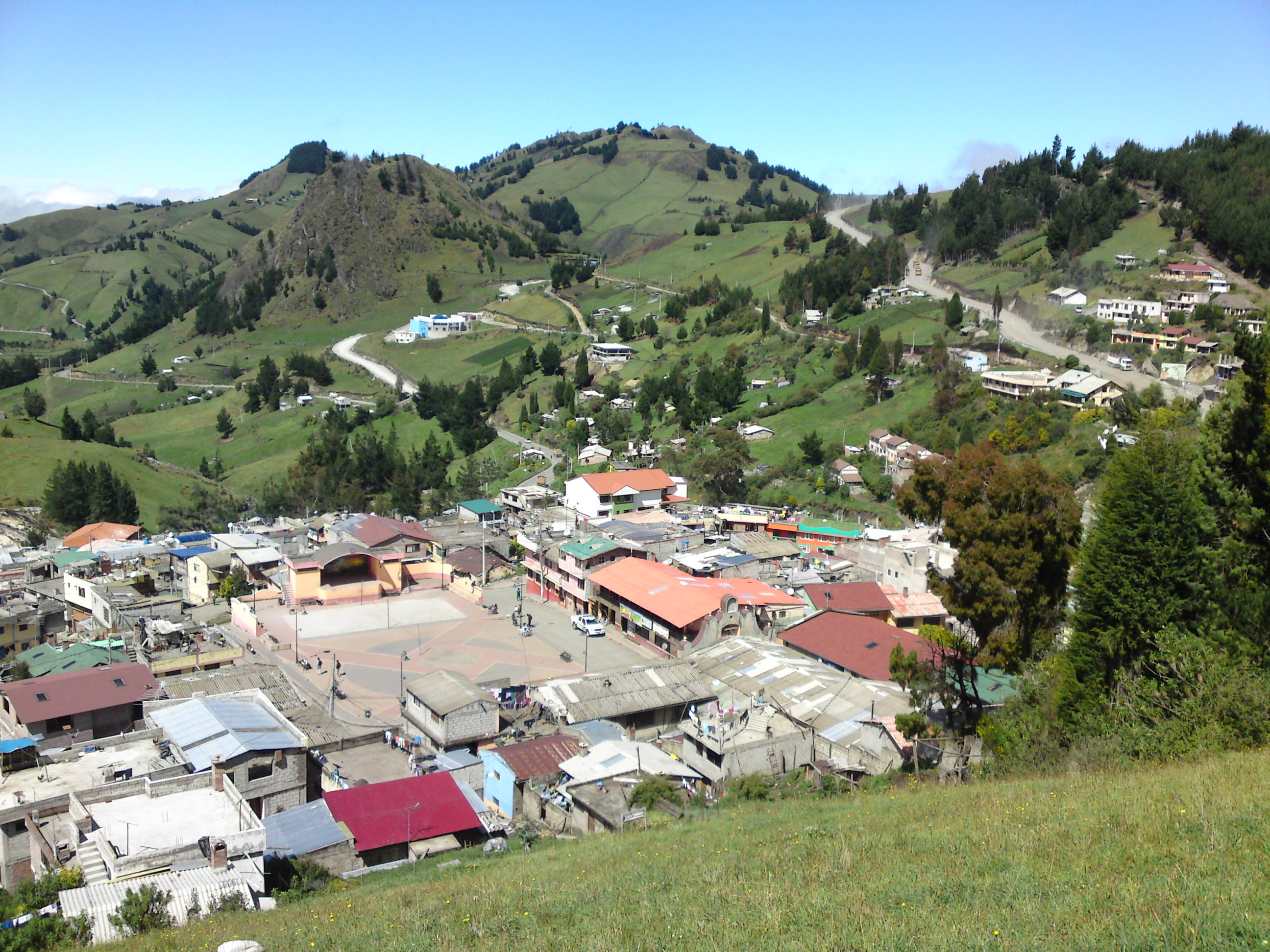
Panoramic view

Salinas de Guaranda, also known as Salinas de Tomabela, is an Ecuadorian village whose name derives from the salt mines that drove its economy prior to the 1970s. It is located at an altitude of 3,500 metres (11,500 ft) in the Andes in the province of Bolivar and its history began long before the Spanish conquest, the first inhabitants were Tomabelas tribe, Chimbus tribe and Simiatug tribe.

Its economy is cooperative, based on the Quechua concept of minkas. The village produces chocolate, cheese and salamis, and explores new products.
