= St George's School in Switzerland =

Private international school in Switzerland

St. George's International School, Switzerland
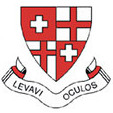

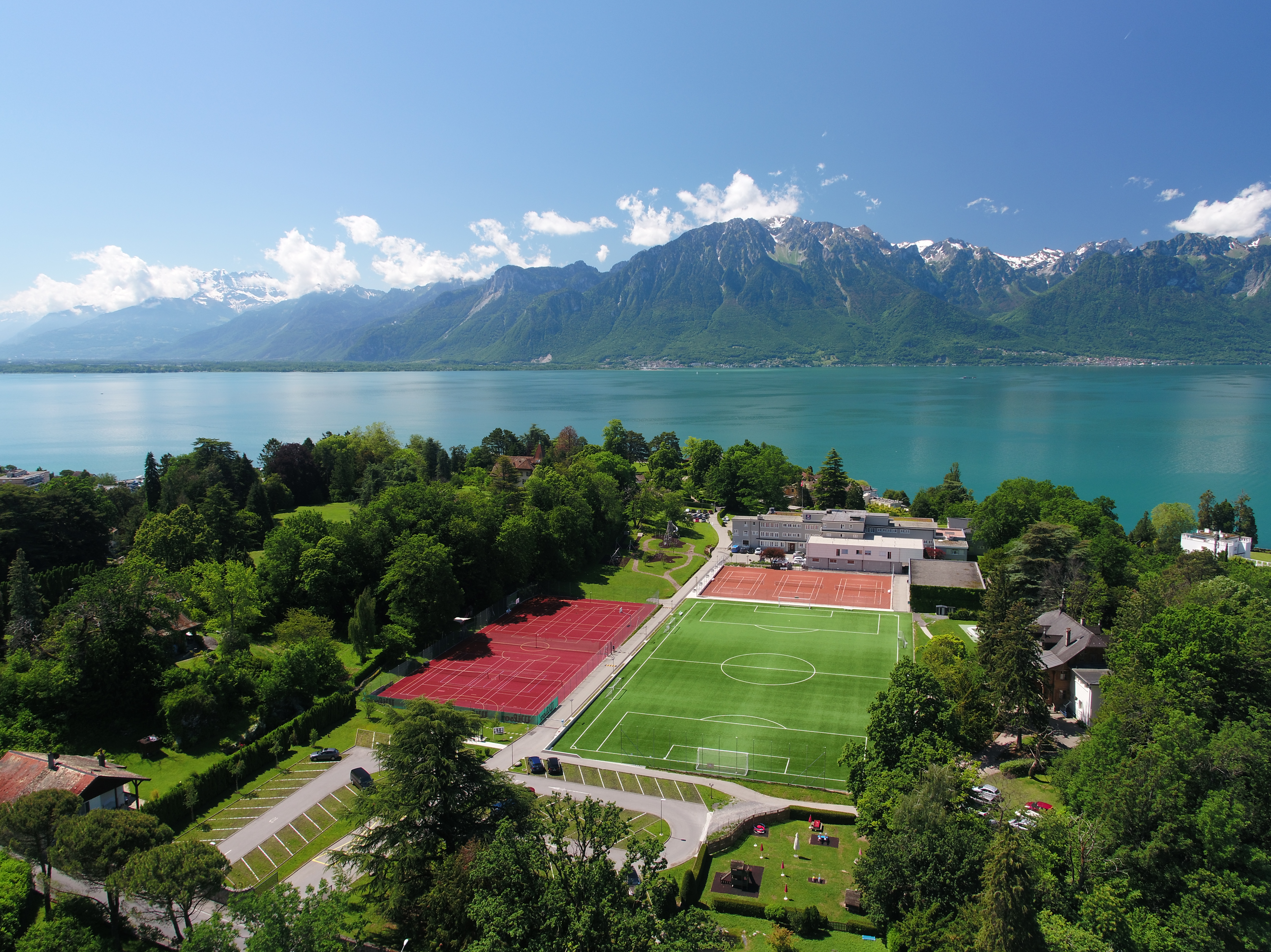

Location
- Chemin de St. Georges 19, CH-1815 Clarens / Montreux; Switzerland

Information
- Type: Independent, non-denominational, co-educational, day and boarding school
- Motto: Levavi Oculos (I Have Lifted My Eyes)
- Established: 1927
- Principal: Dr Ruth Norris
- Enrollment: ~400
- Houses: Atalanta; Diana; Minerva; Vesta
- Alumni: Georgentians
- Website: www.stgeorges.ch

St. George's International School, Switzerland (commonly referred to as St. George's) is a private, co-educational international school for boarding and day students aged 18 months to 18 years old. Its main campus is located in Montreux, Vaud, at the foot of the Alps and on the shores of Lake Léman, approximately halfway between Vevey and the center of the city of Montreux.

== Curriculum ==
The Early Learning School accepts children 18 months to 3 years old, following the Inspired Education early learning approach in a bilingual French/ English environment.

In the Junior School, children aged 3–10 years old access a dual French/English language curriculum.

The Middle School follows the Cambridge International curriculum and Perspective Globales programme in French which lead to the Senior School programmes.

The Senior School includes the four final years of secondary education. Students in years 10 and 11 prepare for the International General Certificate of Secondary Education (IGCSE). The syllabi and examinations are set and administered by the University of Cambridge International Examinations (CIE). The Pre-Diploma Programme is a one-year course that has been designed for students aged 15–16, entering the school in Year 11, who want to build a foundation before embarking on the two-year IB Diploma programme.

Students in years 12–13 prepare for the International Baccalaureate Diploma Programme (IBDP), IB Certificates or the General Diploma Programme. The IBDP is a two-year course of study for students aged 16–19. Administered by the International Baccalaureate Organisation (IBO) it is recognised internationally as a qualification for university entrance.

The General Diploma Programme is also a two-year course. It is an accredited qualification giving students credits which allow them to begin foundation courses in the United Kingdom or attend colleges in North America.

== History ==
Founded as a traditionally British school, St. George's has evolved to become international, offering International General Certificate of Secondary Education and International Baccalaureate curricula in both French and English. The student body consists of around 400 pupils, representing over 60 nationalities. The boarding section is available to students over the age of 10, with a capacity of 100 students.

St. George’s School became a member of the Inspired Education Group in 2015.

== Accreditation ==
International

The school is accredited by:

- Cambridge Assessment International Education
- Council of International Schools (CIS)
- International Baccalaureate Organisation (IBO)

Switzerland

SGIS's (upper) secondary education (Middle and High School) is not approved as a Mittelschule/Collège/Liceo by the Swiss Federal State Secretariat for Education, Research and Innovation (SERI).

== Campus and facilities ==
Situated in a 45,000 square metre campus overlooking Lake Geneva/Lac Léman and the Chablais Alps, the school's main building complex houses administrative offices, an assembly hall/theatre, a library, the boarding section, and purpose-built rooms for art, dance studio, music and information technology as well as general-purpose classrooms. An extension to the main building houses classrooms, laboratories for practical work in biology, physics and chemistry as well as a kitchen and dining room.

The Senior School is based in the main building, while the Junior School uses both the main complex and a restored Swiss Chalet located on campus. Sports facilities include a large multi-purpose sports hall, seven outdoor tennis courts, basketball courts, and playing fields.

== Gallery ==
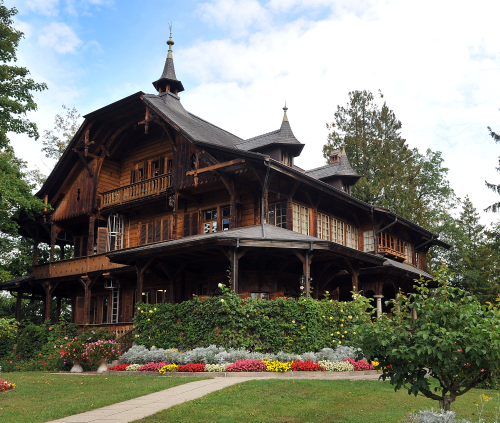
Chalet - Lower Junior School

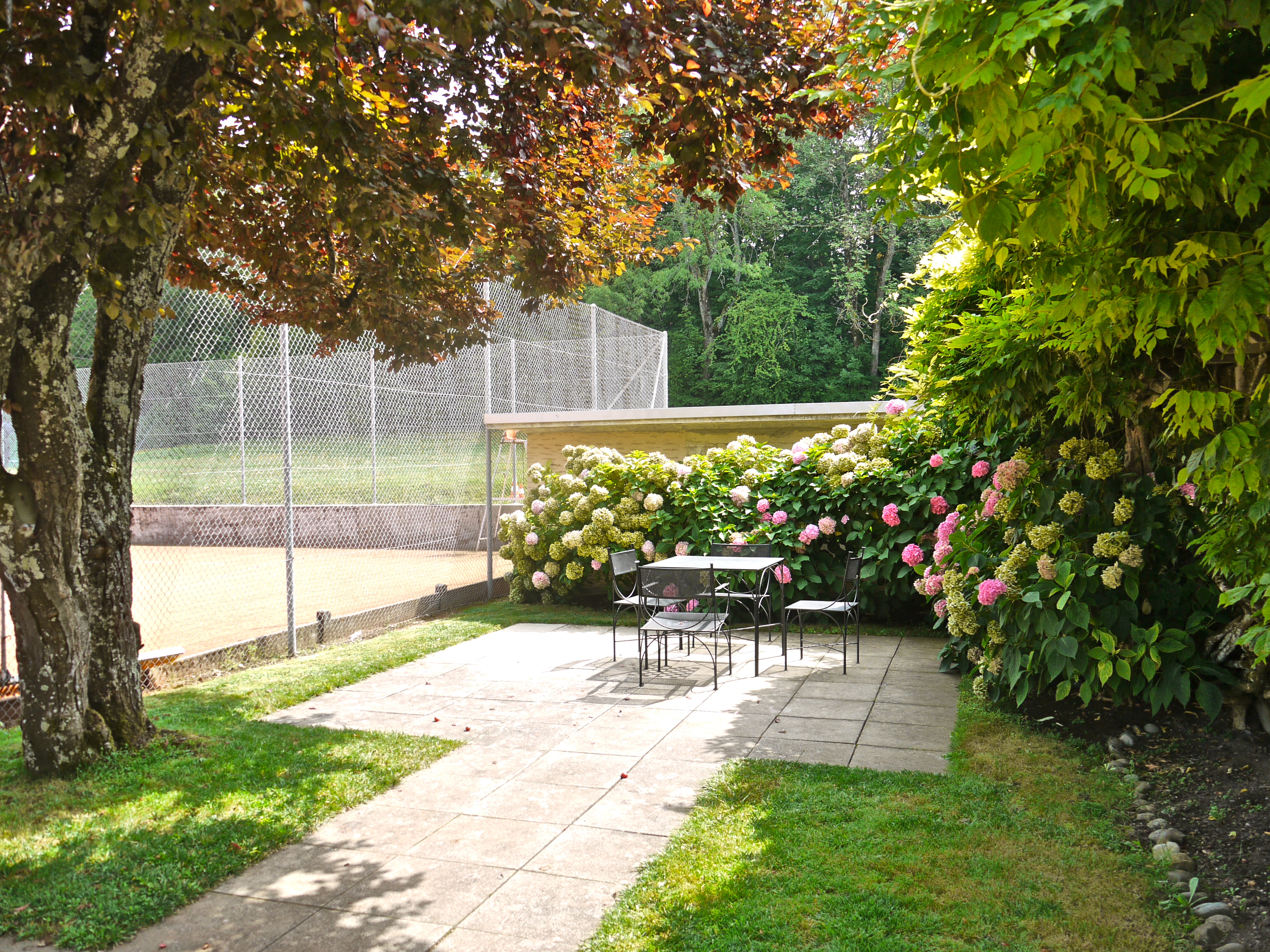
St. George's School Campus

== Notable alumni ==
- Angie Bowie, first wife of David Bowie
- Glenn Close, American actress
- Christina Onassis, businesswoman, socialite, and heiress to the Onassis fortune
- Isabel Noboa, Ecuadorian heiress
