= List of Ecuadorian provinces by Human Development Index =

This is a list of Ecuadorian regions by Human Development Index.

== 2024 by region ==
This is a list of Ecuadorian regions by Human Development Index as ranked within data from 2023.

| Rank | Region | HDI (2023) |
|---|---|---|
High human development
| 1 | Sierra | 0.790 |
| - | Ecuador (average) | 0.777 |
| 2 | Costa | 0.775 |
| 3 | Oriente | 0.741 |

== 2024 by provinces ==
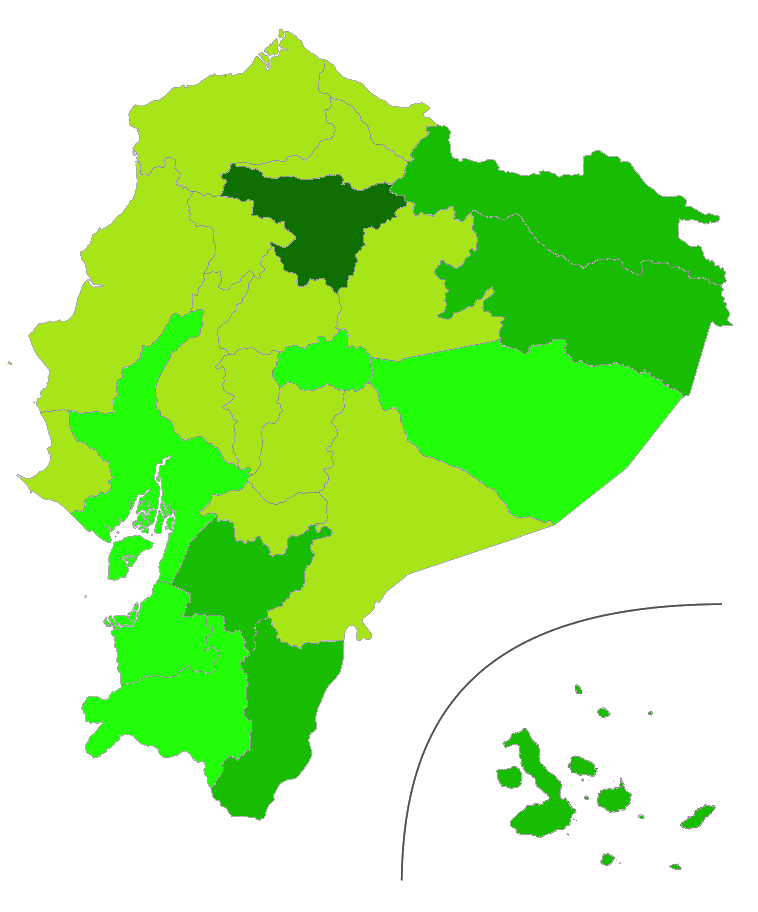
Map of the provinces of Ecuador by Human Development Index categories in increments of 0.050 (based on 2022 data, published in 2024). 0,800–0,849 0,750–0,799 0,700–0,749 0,650–0,699

This is a list of Ecuadorian provinces by Human Development Index as of 2024, using the 2022 data. The following report is not official, but it is calculated with the official data of the indicators of the index, given by the National Institute of Statistics and Censuses (INEC), and the Central Bank of Ecuador (BCE).

| Rank | Province | HDI (2022) |
Very high human development
| 1 | Pichincha | 0.841 |
| 2 | Galápagos | 0.838 |
| 3 | Orellana | 0.830 |
| 4 | Sucumbíos | 0.811 |
High human development
| 5 | Zamora Chinchipe | 0.799 |
| 6 | Azuay | 0.791 |
| 7 | Pastaza | 0.774 |
| 8 | Guayas | 0.771 |
| 9 | Tungurahua | 0.766 |
| - | Ecuador (average) | 0.765 |
| 10 | El Oro | 0.755 |
| 11 | Loja | 0.747 |
| 12 | Carchi | 0.738 |
| 13 | Cotopaxi | 0.737 |
| 14 | Cañar | 0.733 |
| 15 | Imbabura | 0.730 |
| 16 | Santo Domingo de los Tsáchilas | 0.727 |
| 17 | Napo | 0.725 |
| 18 | Bolívar | 0.720 |
| 19 | Manabí | 0.717 |
| 20 | Los Ríos | 0.712 |
| 21 | Chimborazo | 0.708 |
| 22 | Santa Elena | 0.708 |
| 23 | Esmeraldas | 0.706 |
| 24 | Morona Santiago | 0.700 |

== See also ==
- List of countries by Human Development Index
