= Pachakutik =

Pachakutik Plurinational Unity Movement – New Country Movimiento de Unidad Plurinacional Pachakutik – Nuevo País
- Abbreviation: MUPP
- National coordinator: Guillermo Churuchumbi
- Founded: 1 November 1995
- Membership: 159,961 (2016)
- Ideology: Indigenismo; Populism; Socialism; Environmentalism
- Political position: Left-wing
- National affiliation: National Agreement for Change (2016–2017)
- International affiliation: São Paulo Forum
- Colors: Rainbow/White (official); Pink (customary)
- Seats in the National Assembly: 9 / 151
- Prefects: 6 / 23
- Mayors: 26 / 221

Website
- pachakutik.com.ec

The Pachakutik Plurinational Unity Movement – New Country (Spanish: Movimiento de Unidad Plurinacional Pachakutik – Nuevo País) is a political party in Ecuador that is described as Indigenist and left-wing. It was founded primarily as a way to advance the interests of a wide variety of Indigenous peoples' organizations throughout Ecuador.

== History ==
In the context of Ecuador's Indigenous movement, Pachakutik emerged in 1995 after civil society mobilizations by large Indigenous organizations such as CONAIE and CONFENAIE. These movements had previously espoused an abstentionist position in relation to electoral politics, but came together to form Coordinadora de Movimientos Sociales (Social Movement Cooperation, CMS) and then Pachakutik to serve as an alternative to the traditional cluster of political parties that had ruled Ecuadorian politics. However, the party is not formally affiliated with CONAIE.

Pachakutik is a term taken from the Quechua pacha, meaning "time and space" or "the world"; and kuti', meaning "upheaval" or "revolution". Its aim is not just to win elections but to initiate a democratic transformation of Ecuadorian society, centring on the neglected needs of the Indigenous.

In 1996, its electoral strategy was to concentrate on areas where CONAIE or CMS were strong, but it was able to recruit TV personality Freddy Ehlers and CONAIE leader Luis Macas to its list, adding to its national prominence.

The party has been a topic of controversy among Indigenous peoples throughout Ecuador because of its nature as a political party.

According to American-Venezuelan lawyer Eva Golinger, during the 2010 Ecuador coup d'état attempt, Pachakutik stated that President Rafael Correa was authoritarian and issued a press release opposing him and supporting police and army rebels. Golinger accused Pachakutik of having accepted funding from USAID and NED, and playing a role as part of a United States plan to destabilise Latin American democracies in the Bolivarian Alliance for the Americas (ALBA). Pachakutik denied "having any relationship at all with the organism known as USAID, previously NED, not today nor ever". Golinger responded by referring to a National Democratic Institute (NDI, one of the four institutes funded by NED) report from 2007 describing Pachakutik being trained by the NDI in "Triangle of Party Best Practices and strategic planning methodologies" as part of NDI's Latin American/Caribbean Political Party Network of over 1400 individual members, funded under NED Core Grants 2000–031, 2001–048, 2003–028, and 2004–036.

== Political positions ==
The party's core commitments are to environmentalism, social justice and Indigenous rights to recognition and land.

One of the most determined adversaries of the Correa government is Marlon Santi (of the Amazonian Sarayaku people, president of CONAIE (2008–2011) and national coordinator of Pachakutik since 2016) described this eco-socialist position:

The development proposed by the national government is an aggressive development that fails to view Mother Earth as a space of life, or a space that generates life … We promote an alternative and progressive development that respects the rights of the environment, of human beings and of nature. The government, or the economic power, does not understand the model of life that the Indigenous movement has launched regarding our spaces of life where also the majority of natural wealth is to be found, such as water, oil and minerals.

According to left-wing Ecuadorian scholar Pablo Ospina Peralta, it is "a social movement that is diverse, popular, and multicultural. It has been forged in social mobilization, community resistance, and the chaotic and disorganized work of grassroots organizing."

=== The Rights of Nature: Sumak Kawsay ===
After lobbying by the four Pachakutik members of the Ecuadorian Constituent Assembly, the 2008 Ecuadorian Constitution enshrined the Quechua concept of Sumac Kawsay (buen vivir in Spanish, meaning "good living", signifying the rights of nature).

== Electoral history ==
Pachakutik participated in the presidential elections of 1996 despite having only been formed a few months beforehand. In order to give a strong media boost to the party in their first presidential election, they recruited a former TV personality named Freddy Ehlers to represent the party on the highest national stage. Although Ehlers failed to win the election, he placed third with nearly twenty percent of the popular vote despite having less than five months to prepare his campaign. In addition, eight members of Pachakutik won seats as national deputies, including CONAIE president Luis Macas, and although they constituted less than ten percent of the seats in the National Congress of Ecuador, the presence of the party was undeniable. For the first time Indigenous citizens of Ecuador were present in Congress, representing the interests of all groups throughout the country.

Pachakutik, along with a strong civil society effort by CONAIE and others, was instrumental in pushing for the new Ecuadorian Constitution in 1998 which, among other things, recognized the country as multi-cultural, paving the way for such reforms as bilingual education. Since the 1998 elections in which Pachakutik's amount of representation declined, the party has never quite reached its prior levels of support and has been unable to topple the majority of the Congress that does not share their views. It has been criticized by CONAIE for its ineffectiveness, leading to a coup d'état in 2000 organized by CONAIE in association with sympathetic members of the military. Although after only hours of taking the capital and instituting a three-man junta including CONAIE president Antonio Vargas the government dissipated, echoing CONAIE's frustration. Pachakutik has since distanced itself somewhat from CONAIE while still remaining intensely involved with gaining Indigenous rights.

At the 2002 legislative elections, the party won at least 11 out of 100 seats. Its candidate Lucio Gutiérrez, member of the Patriotic Society Party 21 January won 20.3% of the vote in the presidential elections of the same day and won the second round with 58.7%. After three months of government Gutierrez broke up its alliance with Pachakutik and he discharged its ministers. The party soon grew to despise him and publicly criticize him. In 2003 they even began to call for the removal of President Gutiérrez publicly in the media.

However, with Gutierrez out, the return of Luis Macas to the presidency of CONAIE and the opposition to the signature of an agreement of free trade with United States, they have been able to reunify to the movement.

At the 2006 elections, the party won at least 6 out of 100 seats. Its candidate Luis Macas, obtained 2.19% of the vote in the presidential elections of the same day.

At the 2009 elections, the party had its worst results since its founding, but still maintains representation, with 4 seats out of 124 in National Assembly.

At the 2013 elections, the party won at least 5 out of 137 seats. Its candidate Alberto Acosta, obtained 3.26% of the vote in the presidential elections of the same day.

The party made significant electoral gains in 2021, winning 27 seats in the National Assembly. The good performance was partly owed due to their prominent role in the 2019 Ecuadorian protests. 2021 represented a breakthrough beyond Indigenous voters, as it "struck a chord with young and disenchanted voters who responded to its call for greater protection of the environment and focus on gender issues." However, its vote declined dramatically in 2023, as indicated in the table below.

== Electoral results ==
=== Presidential elections ===
Year	Candidates		First Round		Second Round		Results	Notes
Year	President	Vice President	Votes	%	Votes	%	Results	Notes
1996	Freddy Ehlers	Rosana Vinueza	785,124	21%	—N/a	—N/a	3rd	
2002	Lucio Gutiérrez	Alfredo Palacio	943,123	21%	2,803,243	55%	Elected	Coalition with PSP
2006	Luis Macas	César Sacoto	119,577	2%	—N/a	—N/a	6th	
2013	Alberto Acosta	Marcia Caicedo	280,539	3%	—N/a	—N/a	6th	Parte de la UPI
2017	Paco Moncayo	Monserratt Bustamante	634,030	7%	—N/a	—N/a	4th	Parte del ANC
2021	Yaku Pérez	Virna Cedeño	1,798,057	19%	—N/a	—N/a	3rd	
2023	Yaku Pérez	Nory Pinela Morán	391,674	4%	—N/a	—N/a	6th	

=== Legislative elections ===
Election	Votes	Votes %	Seats	+/–
1996	718,983	20.4	19 / 82	
2002	325,365	9.2	5 / 120	▼14
2006	–	–	11 / 100	▲6
2007	–	–	6 / 100	▼5
2009	948,638	1.5	4 / 124	▼2
2013	4,149,243	4.73	5 / 137	▲1
2013	As a part of the alliance Plurinational Unity of the Lefts			
2017	2,740,043	2.67	4 / 137	▼1
2021	1,348,595	16.81	27 / 137	▲23
2023	349,450	4.07	4 / 137	▼23

== See also ==
- Pachakuti
- Pachakuti Indigenous Movement (Bolivian indigenist party)
