= Patriotic Society Party =

Political party in Ecuador

Patriotic Society Party Partido Sociedad Patriótica
- Abbreviation: PSP
- Leader: Lucio Gutiérrez
- President: Lucio Gutiérrez
- Secretary-General: Juan Carlos Rodríguez
- Founded: March 4, 2002
- Headquarters: Cuenca, Ecuador
- Ideology: Populism; Personalism
- Political position: Centre-left to centre-right
- Colors: Red, green
- National Assembly: 1 / 151
- Provincial Prefects: 0 / 23
- Mayors: 16 / 221

Party flag

Website
- Former website

The Patriotic Society Party (Spanish: Partido Sociedad Patriótica, PSP), formerly the January 21 Patriotic Society (Spanish: Sociedad Patriótica 21 de Enero) is a populist and personalist political party in Ecuador, led by former army colonel Lucio Gutiérrez. "January 21" refers to the date of the 2000 Ecuadorian coup d'état.

At the legislative elections, 20 October 2002, the party won at least two out of one hundred seats, and additional seats in alliances with other parties. Its leader, Lucio Gutiérrez, a key figure in the 2000 coup d'état, formed an alliance with the indigenous Pachakutik Movement and won 20.3% of the vote in the presidential elections of the same day, winning the second round with 58.7%. His campaign appealed especially to indigenous citizens and lower-class voters. However, Gutiérrez was deposed in 2005, and replaced with Alfredo Palacio, an independent. Gutiérrez subsequently returned to Ecuador and was imprisoned for five months before being released. He was not allowed to participate in the 2006 election to succeed Palacio, as his political rights were suspended.

His brother, Gilmar Gutierrez, was the Society's presidential candidate in 2006. Gilmar received 17% of the vote and came in third place. However, his party won 23 seats, making it the second-largest party in the National Assembly, where no party had a majority. Defections to the government left the January 21 Patriotic Society with 19 seats.

Lucio Gutiérrez recovered his political rights in 2008 and has unsuccessfully run for president again in 2009 and 2013.

== Election results ==
=== National Assembly elections ===
Election	Leader	Votes	%	Seats	+/–
2002	Lucio Gutiérrez	188,546	4.93	6 / 100	New
2006	Lucio Gutiérrez	579,775	18.56	23 / 100	▲17
2009	Lucio Gutiérrez	9,779,869	15.17	19 / 124	▼4
2013	Lucio Gutiérrez	4,955,320	5.64	5 / 137	▼14
2017	Lucio Gutiérrez	239,594	2.94	2 / 137	▼3
2021	Lucio Gutiérrez	145,398	1.81	1 / 137	▼1
2023	Lucio Gutiérrez	264,701	3.16	3 / 137	▲2
2025	Lucio Gutiérrez	210,083	2.31	1 / 151	▼2

=== Constituent Assembly elections ===
Election	Votes	%	Party leader	Seats	+/–
2007	Lucio Gutiérrez	294,240	7.28	19 / 130	New
