= Plurinational Unity of the Lefts =

Plurinational Unity of the Lefts Unidad Plurinacional de la Izquierdas
- Leader: Collective leadership
- Founded: 2011
- Dissolved: 2014
- Ideology: Anti-capitalism; Communism; Democratic socialism Marxism–Leninism; Progressivism
- Political position: Left-wing to far-left

Plurinational Unity of the Lefts (Unidad Plurinacional de las Izquierdas) was a left-wing political coalition in Ecuador, created in 2011 and Dissolved in 2014.

== History ==
In 2009, Pachakutik and the Democratic People's Movement (MPD) broke with the ruling PAIS Alliance over disagreements on water law and teacher evaluations. In the National Assembly, a new caucus formed called the Plurinational, Progressive, and Leftist Democratic Assembly, composed of Pachakutik and MPD assemblymen and assemblywomen.

=== 2011 Referendum ===
Plurinational Unity of the Lefts participated in the referendum and popular consultation of 2011, advising a "no" vote on questions 1–9, and "yes" on 10. They used the slogan "Not this time, President" recognizing their past support of President Correa's proposals, but conveying their support was over.

=== Protests of 2012 ===
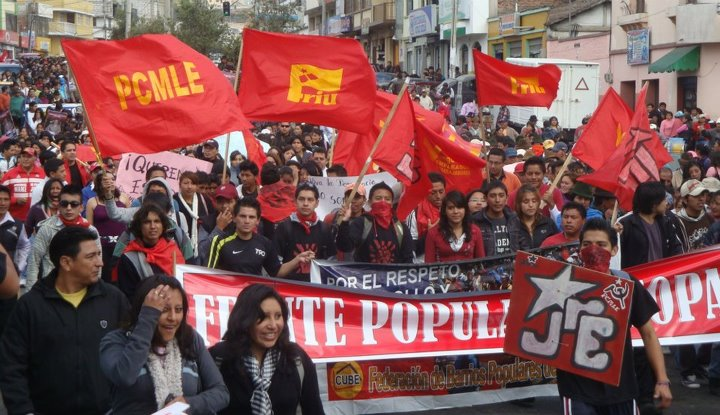
PCMLE formation in 2012.

Beginning on 8 March 2012, Plurinational Unity of the Lefts participated in a series of peaceful protests, commonly called the 8-M Movement, by indigenous groups, left-wing opponents of the government, environmental groups, LGBT groups, and students, which culminated in the arrival of more than 30,000 people in the streets of Ecuador.

=== 2014 Dissolution ===
After a failure to consolidate for the February 2014 elections, the coalition was dissolved.

== Participating Parties ==
The coalition comprised the following ten parties (in alphabetical order):

- Democratic People's Movement
- Ethics and Democracy Network
- Marxist–Leninist Communist Party of Ecuador
- Montecristi Lives
- Movement Convocation
- Pachakutik Plurinational Unity Movement – New Country
- Participation Movement
- Party of Revolutionary Socialism
- Participa Movement Radical Democracy
- Popular Power

== Electoral Results ==
=== National Assembly ===
National Assembly
| Election year | # of overall votes | % of overall vote | # of overall seats won |
| 2013 | 4,149,243 | 4.73 | 5 / 137 |

=== Presidential ===
Presidency
| Election year | Candidate | # of overall votes | % of overall vote |
| 2013 | Alberto Acosta | 280,539 | 3.26 |

== See also ==
- PAIS Alliance
