= Álvaro Noboa =

Ecuadorian businessman and politician (born 1950)

Álvaro Noboa Pontón
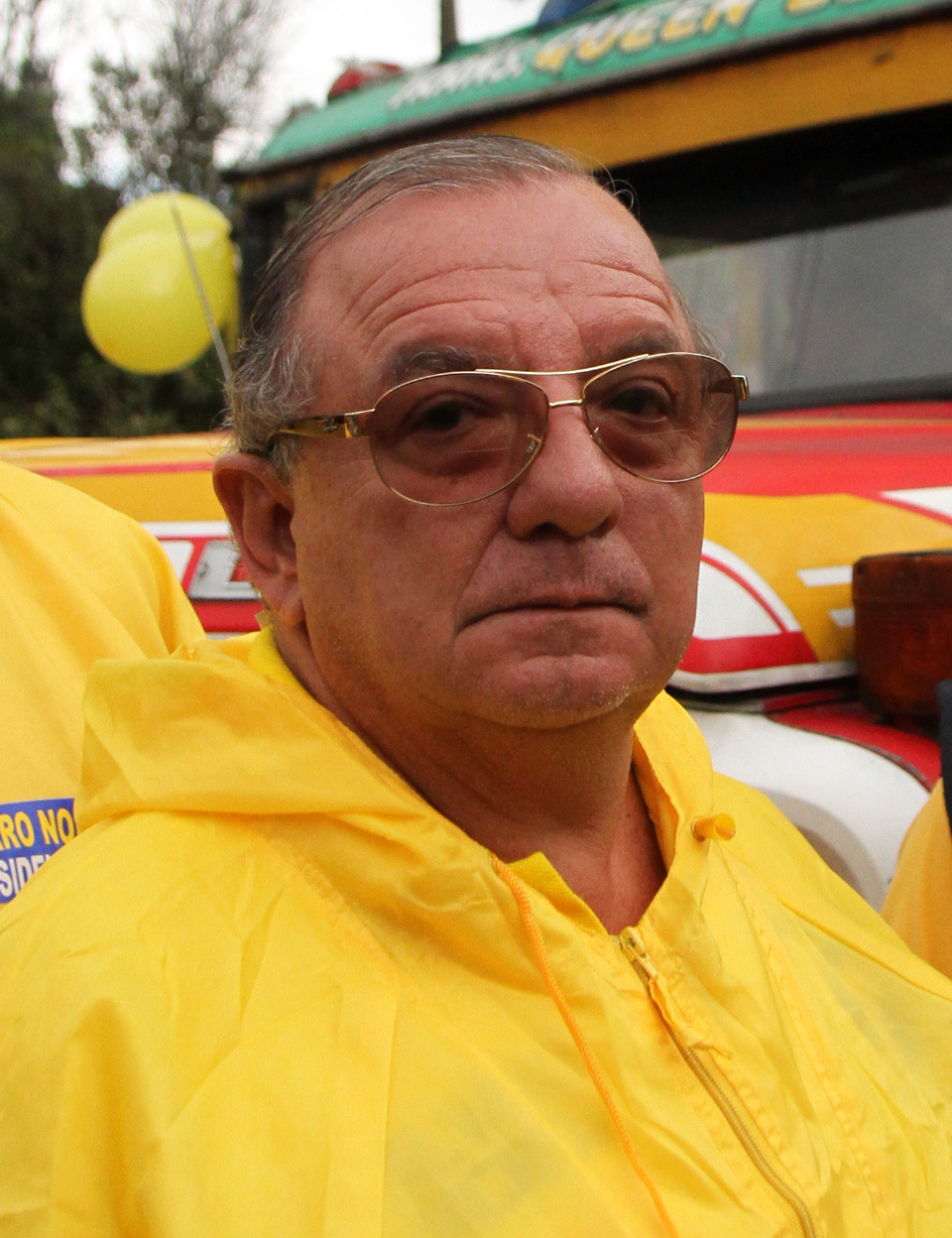
- Noboa in 2013
- Born: November 21, 1950 (age 75); Guayaquil, Ecuador
- Education: San Jose La Salle Catholic School, Guayaquil; Institut Le Rosey, Switzerland; Guayaquil State University; American Management Association, New York
- Occupation: Businessman
- Political party: Ecuadorian Roldosist Party (formerly); PRIAN (2002–2014)
- Spouse: Anabella Azín
- Children: 4, including Daniel Noboa
- Father: Luis Noboa Naranjo
- Relatives: Isabel Noboa (sister); Lavinia Valbonesi (daughter-in-law)
- Website: www.alvaronoboa.com/en/

Álvaro Fernando Noboa Pontón (born November 21, 1950) is an Ecuadorian businessman and politician. He is the father of the incumbent president, Daniel Noboa.

Noboa has been actively involved in politics as a perennial candidate, unsuccessfully running for the office of President of Ecuador in 1998, 2002, 2006, 2009 and 2013. In 2007, he was elected national assemblyman. In 2013, Noboa ran for office for the fifth time unsuccessfully. In the 2023 Ecuadorian general election, his son, Daniel Noboa, was elected President of Ecuador, the youngest ever to hold that position.

In 1997, already owning 24% of Bonita Bananas, Noboa purchased another 25% of the shares of the holding company for the family business. Presently, he runs the Noboa Group of Companies and Noboa Corporation, with more than 110 companies in Ecuador and around the world, including branch offices in United States, Antwerp, Rome, Japan, Argentina, and New Zealand.

== Personal life and education ==
Noboa attended San José La Salle Catholic School in Guayaquil as well as the Institut Le Rosey in Switzerland. He entered the University of Guayaquil, graduating with a legal degree. He also studied business administration at the American Management Association in New York. He is trilingual. Noboa decided to pursue his professional career in the business field as an entrepreneur.

His sister is business executive Isabel Noboa. Noboa's brother-in-law, Omar Quintana, was president of the C.S. Emelec football club and served as the former President of National Congress of Ecuador in 2005. His son Daniel Noboa Azin has been the president since November, 2023 after winning the 2023 Ecuadorian general election.

== Business life ==
=== Family business, inheritance and litigation ===
The estate of Álvaro Noboa's late father, Luis Noboa Naranjo, the founder of the family's banana business, was the subject of protracted litigation. According to Forbes magazine, Luis Noboa's heirs spent $20 million in legal fees culminating in a ruling by a British court: "In November 2002 a London judge found that Álvaro rightfully owned a 49% stake in Fruit Shippers Ltd., the holding company for the family business. That stake is worth $300 million, we estimate. Noboa, who has made our billionaire's list previously, claims his assets are worth at least $1 billion. 'It was a full victory', Noboa said."

The court's ruling said: "The principal business of Luis No boa Narrator was the export of bananas. But at the time of his death his interests also included coffee, sugar refining, flour milling, shipping, banking, insurance and soft drinks. The principal Ecuadorian company engaged in the banana business was Exportation [sic.] Banneker No boa S.A. (EBN). The ultimate holding company and the company owning most of the overseas business was [Fruit Shippers Ltd.] a company incorporated in the Bahamas." According to the Cadwalader, Wickersham & Taft Law firm, The Hon. Mr. Justice Langley rejected the evidence of the sisters and he held that their evidence was untruthful and "had been starkly exposed as inconsistent, lacking coherence and wholly unreliable".

=== Business ===
In 1973, Noboa established Promandato Global S.A., a firm that unites several real estate companies considered to be one of the largest firms in Ecuador. In 1988, he founded Revista La Verdad, a monthly magazine. On 22 April 1988, he founded Banco del Litoral. On 22 July 1988, he established Global Financing Company and other investment companies on an international scale. All these companies and businesses together became known as [Grupo de Empresas Ab. Alvaro Noboa P.] His exporting company, Exportadora Bananera Noboa, had sales of $220 million in 2004 and $219 million in 2005.

=== Latin American meeting ===
Since 2003, Alvaro Noboa has attended the annual Entrepreneurial Meeting for Latin American Businessmen. The summit was born in 2003 by initiative of the Mexican Carlos Slim, a personal friend of Noboa. The meeting was not meant to discuss their business concerns but rather to broach social issues in the region. It has been held in Mexico in 2003, Dominican Republic in 2004, Brazil in 2005, Argentina in 2006, Chile in 2007 and Panamá in 2008.

=== Labour practices ===
Usleap once accused Noboa of opposing campaigns for workers' rights within his own companies, and Noboa Group workers have been illegally dismissed for joining trade unions. In one 2002 incident striking workers at a Noboa subsidiary were attacked and–according to a Human Rights Watch report–several were shot by organized assailants.

In 2002, the New York Times reported on working conditions on Álvaro Noboa's banana plantations in Ecuador. The article specifically mentioned the 3,000-acre (12 km^{2}) plantation known as Los Álamos that employed about 1,300 people. The workers of Los Álamos unionized in March 2002. Noboa's company responded by firing more than 120 of them. The article read: "When the workers occupied part of the hacienda, guards armed with shotguns, some wearing hoods, arrived at 2 a.m. on May 16, according to workers, and fired on some who had refused to move from the entrance gate, wounding two."

Noboa's company, on the other hand, claims that the conflict was illegally initiated since the number of workers' with which the special committees were assembled never reached the number required by law, that is, a majority. They tried to fool authorities by having participants who were not workers. Both the workers' committee and the strike declaration were illegal.

It was said to the public and press that workers involved in this conflict were guilty of outrageous conduct at the farm, which motivated accusations brought forth before the authorities whereby the police had to intervene in order to safeguard company assets. The company told that conflict arose causing substantial losses due to unlawful stoppage of agricultural activity.

=== Child labor ===
Noboa Group was also criticized in a HRW investigation into child labor practices in the banana industry. In April 2002 Human Rights Watch released a report that "found that Ecuadorian children as young as eight work on banana plantations in hazardous conditions, while adult workers fear firing if they try to exercise their right to organize."

Chiquita, Del Monte, Dole, Favorita and Noboa's company were all accused of being supplied by plantations on which children worked. Noboa's company claims that to be untrue since child labor in the agricultural sphere is part of the existing countryside culture which not only asked but demanded the performance of some type of agricultural labor from its siblings during vacations, in order to make ends meet, and to avoid vagrancy and therefore the possibility of delinquent behavior. It was pointed out that the work performed by these minors, and which fulfilled social and family-oriented needs, was always adequate for their age group and received all guarantees and conditions contemplated in social and labor legislation. It was said to the public: "Ever since abolishment of child- labor became a reality in agricultural concerns, Noboa Corporation took corrective measures to the extent that child- labor has been non-existent for many years not even for minors 15-18 years old which is permissible by law, due to consistent political attacks which distort the truth of the matter."

== Business practices ==
=== In search of new international markets ===
As a businessman always on the lookout for new business opportunities and concerned about the economic situation of his country, Álvaro Noboa announced his decision in October 2009 to search for new international markets for his products, organizing meetings with foreign investors to bring about new deals.

"Ecuador suffers from an internal crisis cancer," he asserted to the country's press media, forcing him to visit countries like France, Croatia, Belgium and Spain, among others, and which have invited him to invest, while in Ecuador there is no support for business development given by Rafael Correa's government. "I am too demotivated and knocked back to continue investing," said Álvaro Noboa to one member of the press who asked him about the reasons for his decision. The former candidate stated that "In Ecuador there are so many problems that we have slowed down investment a bit. Now we are going to look at continuing development of agricultural production, but in other countries like China, Macedonia, India, and various regions of Africa. There, from the outset, they exempt us from paying taxes for five years and they grant us political protection, incentives, and we are even seen as popular heroes for giving employment, while here in Ecuador we are persecuted."

Markets like England and Eastern Europe are seen now as potential new clients for Ecuadorian products, such as bananas, flowers, crafts, shrimp, rice, and tuna, among others, according to the intentions manifested by Álvaro Noboa in his new worldwide commercial undertaking. "There is a negative view of Ecuador in the world because of the political system it employs." He was able to perceive this reaction during his international tour of European countries in search of new markets for Ecuadorian products. He also mentioned that the products that Ecuador generates for the world are considered to be of good quality and cost.

=== Shell companies ===
A 2005 investigation uncovered 99 companies in Ecuador registered to fictitious addresses. All were associated with Noboa's business. The companies, with names like Dalioca, Domintini, Abacus and Carani, were listed in the archives of Ecuador's Ministry of Labor as being third-party labor-placement businesses, which served other, larger companies by hiring workers on their behalf. The same telephone number was found in all companies' files and it connected to a recording that said that Corporacion Noboa had been reached. Then a person got on the phone and said that no companies with those names functioned at that location. The shell companies were also traced to an address that corresponded to an abandoned warehouse in the city of Guayaquil. One company's file, Empacadora Tropical, had written the warehouse as the address of Corporacion Noboa. The company's shareholders were Fruit Shippers and New York Commodities, two companies based in Canada and the Bahamas, respectively. The shell companies were used to dodge labor obligations on the part of the employer. Courage Exchange, Communications Director of Grupo Noboa, said to a newspaper that Noboa's company knew nothing about these links.

=== Museum ===
On January 25, 2006, he founded the Luis A. Noboa Naranjo Museum (Spanish: Museo Luis A. Noboa Naranjo) to honor his father's memory and to exhibit for the first time, the important collection of paintings that Luis Noboa Naranjo collected over his lifetime. As of 2012, Noboa has sponsored three Biennale events over the years in order to exhibit the works of art of artists from all over the world and has recognized them with important Awards.

=== Tax evasion ===
In March 2005, Ecuador's government closed one of Noboa's companies, Elaborados de Café, a coffee-processing business, for failing to file a tax return. Also, the government determined that another Noboa company, Frutería Jambelí Frujasa, owed almost $20 million in back taxes, including about $7 million due to interest accrued. The amount was calculated as part of an audit of Noboa's 114 firms. A newspaper contacted the firm and was told by employees that it no longer existed. The number was that of Corporacion Noboa.

Other Noboa enterprises were notified that they owed taxes, including: Industrial Molinera, a flour mill, ($2.4 million), Compañía Nacional de Plásticos, a plastic-manufacturing firm, ($1.1 million) and Manufacturas de Cartón, a cardboard box factory, ($3.1 million). A member of Noboa's party and member of Ecuador's congress, Sylka Sanchez, called the audits "blackmail" and said the arrears came to light after Noboa refused to join a legislative coalition headed by then-president of Ecuador Lucio Gutierrez.

Ecuador's internal revenue director, Vicente Saavedra, denied that Noboa was being singled out and said audits were done on a million and a half taxpayers. "If that's what they call persecution, then there ought to be a law so that politicians don't have to pay their taxes," he said to a newspaper.

=== Legal issues ===
Some of Noboa's Ecuadorian companies have faced lawsuits and Servicio de Rentas Internas claims. The banana exporting company also has been audited by international organisations due to child labor issues and strike conflicts. Noboa's major company in Ecuador, Exportadora Bananera Noboa, faced as of February 2009, an assessment of three hundred million dollars (Ecuador was dollarized in 2000) imposed by the governmental revenue service of Ecuador, the SRI. A representative of TP Consulting, an independent audit firm, stated that what is in question is the price for a crate of bananas: that which the SRI has fixed is a number above that determined by other parts of the government (the Ecuadorian banana business is regulated by the government which sets prices paid to producers for bananas, the cost of exportation and the referential FOB price.). The representatives of Bananera Noboa have stated that exportation prices were within the range of prices of exportation of other exporters, according to information from the Central Bank of Ecuador. The audit, undertaken by TP Consulting (who were contracted to carry out a study of the transfer prices of Bananera Noboa), revealed an amount to be paid of US$139,949.00. As of 2011, Bananera Noboa was still facing charges from the SRI, but the legal representatives of the Company state that the company 'Is not Bankrupt'.

A judge in New York has recommended a $6.96m default judgment against Alvaro Noboa in NYKCool's long hunt for payment from the empire of the Ecuadorian banana baron. If Magistrate Judge Andre Peck's recommendation is approved by the higher ranking jurist overseeing the lawsuit, it will follow a string of such judgments against companies alleged to be under Noboa's control. All but one of the judgments has gone unpaid.

NYKCool, the Stockholm-based subsidiary of Japan's NYK Line, has been seeking payment of a 2011 arbitration award for $8.79m, plus costs, over a collapsed contract of affreightment (COA) with companies associated with Noboa, who controls the Bonita Banana brand and who was placed fifth in last year's Ecuadorian presidential elections. The reefer operator was finally able to collect some of the funds after District Judge Lewis Kaplan, of the federal court in Manhattan, which serves as the legal fight's epicentre, approved a default judgment against Noboa-linked fruit exporter Truisfruit in March. Truisfruit has appealed that decision.

Peck's recommendation for a direct judgment against Noboa is likely to come as no surprise, given the judge's refusal last month to take up Noboa's request to throw out NYKCool's claims against him because his challenge came late in the game. "The failure of Noboa to state under oath whether he received email or other notice of the lawsuit will also be considered by the court in ruling on the plaintiff's default motion," Peck said at the time. "Since Noboa has not answered the complaint even at this late date, default is likely. It is really time for the defendants' shell game to stop." Noboa's lawyers at law firm Paul Hastings had argued that the multimillionaire businessman was not subject to the jurisdiction of a court in New York but Peck said in his recommendation that NYKCool's allegations that other entities in the legal fight are mere alter egos of Noboa were enough to establish the court's ability to hear the case against him.

Over the course of his career in public service, which began in 1998 with his first candidacy for President of the Republic, Noboa has been the object of multiple denunciations and labor- and tax-related allegations, as well as political and personal ideological attacks, from what Noboa describes as powerful and influential political and commercial adversaries within the country.

His foundation "Crusade for a New Humanity" (Spanish: Cruzada Nueva Humanidad) draws on Noboa's personal fortune to fund social projects. While running for the presidency, some have criticized the foundation social work for mostly political reasons. Noboa, however, says he has worked in this foundation continuously for more than 30 years, long before his presidential run.

== Social work ==
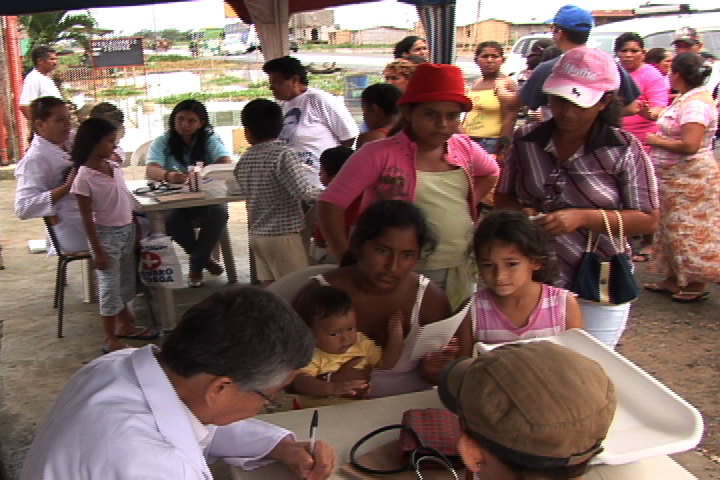
Medical attention at Babahoyo and Barreiro

In 1977, Noboa established the [Fundación Cruzada Nueva Humanidad (Crusade for a New Humanity Foundation)], which began with the philosophy of fighting misery, disease, ignorance, spiritual weakness, hatred and other misfortunes that afflict man. The Foundation is based on the Christian beliefs of love, unity and self-improvement. As of 2012, the foundation continues with its mission.

According to the foundation website, currently, the medical brigades of the "New Humanity Crusade" Foundation are carrying out a plan of nationwide scope for permanent medical service and assistance to marginal areas of various rural populations and cities, staying always alert for emergency cases.

== Politics ==
=== Political experience ===
In 1996, Álvaro Noboa was named President of Ecuador's Monetary Board by then-President of the Republic Abdalá Bucaram. According to an account of Bucaram's last day in office (he was overthrown before his term expired) Noboa was the last person to leave the presidential palace in Quito before Bucaram himself left the building 30 minutes later in the evening of February 7, 1997.

While in office Bucaram used his presidential powers to sway the dispute between Noboa and his siblings. Early in his short-lived administration, when Exportadora Bananera Noboa was not yet in Noboa's hands, Bucaram ordered the Superintendent of Companies to intervene in the company citing as a pretext the lowering of the price paid for bananas in bulk. Then in January 1997 Bucaram threatened Noboa's siblings with the possibility of expropriating a large estate.

During his short tenure as head of Ecuador's Monetary Board (August 1996-February 1997) Noboa owned a small bank, Banco Litoral, and collaborated as part of an economic team that included Domingo Cavallo, the architect of Argentina's monetary convertibility policy during the 1990s and special foreign advisor to Bucaram, David Goldbaum, head of the National Finance Corporation and owner of Banco Territorial, and Roberto Isaias, then-president of now-defunct Filanbanco, one of Ecuador's largest banks, who served as economic advisor.

Noboa pledged to stop the privatization program began by the previous administration of Sixto Durán Ballén and replace that with a policy of capitalization of state-owned enterprises, like the program implemented by Gonzalo Sánchez de Lozada in Bolivia. However, Noboa did not outright dismiss the idea of privatizing some state-owned companies.

The administration planned to eliminate gas subsidies, except for the poorest, and to sell off part of EMETEL, the national telephone company, as well as parts of state-owned energy industries. Noboa, faced with a budget shortfall, claimed that Ecuador's government could have raised hundreds of millions of dollars by going after tax evaders and late-payers of taxes.

=== Political party ===
Noboa is the leader of the Institutional Renewal Party of National Action (Partido Renovador Institucional de Acción Nacional, PRIAN), a populist party he founded himself after separating from the populist center-right Ecuadorian Roldosist Party (Partido Roldosista Ecuatoriano, PRE).

=== Responses to Criticisms ===
Over the course of his public service career, which began in 1998 with his first-time candidacy for President of the Republic, Noboa has been the object of multiple denunciations and labor- and tax- related allegations, as well as political and personal, ideological attacks, by what he describes as powerful and influential political and commercial adversaries from within the country who wish to do him harm via a permanent smear campaign aimed at denigrating his honor and that of his family, thereby evading his fight against corruption on behalf of the poor and undermining his aim to transform Ecuador into a developed country. In July 2009, Noboa defended himself via a public communication directed to both the country and the entire world and published by the Ecuadorian press, in which he characterizes as vile and perverse all of the infamies that have been brought against him, either directly, or through third parties, over the course of the years.

Remonstrating, he pointed out that, "I have been attacked through my businesses, being discredited that I don't pay sufficient taxes, despite the fact that I, and the companies, are among the biggest contributors in the country. Without success, they have tried to make an enemy of me among the workers of my businesses, when in reality I maintain excellent work relations and a great sense of affection towards my workers and employees. They have wanted to prosecute me in order to take as much money as possible from me. They have wanted to ruin me. They have wanted to convince Ecuadorians that I am just one more heir, however what I own, I have through my own labors of more than 40 years. They have wanted to accuse me be unfair economically to my siblings when those family members are all very well off and I have never affected them. They have wanted to damage my image with slander of all kinds. They have attacked my sense of honor."

Noboa describes himself as the businessman who has generated the most employment in the country, and says that he feels proud to continue creating businesses and generating well-being, and of the social work that he carries out by giving free medical attention to hundreds of thousands of Ecuadorians, and that he feels proud of his wife and the family that they have formed together. The richest man in Ecuador considers himself a part of history and claims that he will continue to make history through his work, his social efforts, and public service. He warns that he will not stop in light of the infamies and the attacks of all kinds because he loves Ecuador and desires education, health care, housing, a worthy life of well-being and progress for its people.

=== Presidential runs ===
In 1998 Noboa ran for president for the first time. In the first round of elections, held on May 31, Noboa got 1,022,026 votes, 26.61% of valid ballots. That placed him second behind Jamil Mahuad (1,341,089 votes, 34.92% of valid ballots) and both battled in a runoff held on July 12. Noboa lost the runoff by 102,519 votes. Mahuad won with 2,243,000 votes. After the election Noboa claimed that fraud had been committed. He accused Supreme Electoral Tribunal President Patricio Vivanco of refusing to conduct a recount as was his request. He said that some precinct acts had been corrected using whiteout and others showed no blank votes.

He ran for president a second time in 2002, again reaching the runoff, though he received only 17% of the vote in the first round. He lost the November 24, 2002 second round to Lucio Gutiérrez (2,803,243 or 54.79% to 2,312,854 or 45.21%).

In 2006, he decided to run once again as presidential candidate for his party. With 99.5 percent of votes from the October 15 election officially counted, Noboa won 26.83 percent of the vote, Rafael Correa the closest opponent received 22.84 percent of the vote. The two candidates contested a run-off on November 26. With 98.91% of the votes cast, Correa had an unassailable lead with 56.8% of valid votes cast. Noboa at first refused to accept defeat, and suggested that he might challenge the legitimacy of the ballot count. Noboa ran for president for the fourth time in 2009, when Correa called an early election. This time, Noboa only received 11% of the vote, coming in a distant third place, behind Lucio Gutierrez, who came in second place, and Correa, who was reelected without a runoff.

On 2 May 2012, Noboa announced that he would be running for a fifth time to become the President of Ecuador in the upcoming 2013 Ecuadorian Presidential Elections. Noboa warned that Correa's government "will continue to use the IRS to bring to bankruptcy Bananera Noboa and not allow to defend itself in court as it shall be done. They will keep controlling 100% of the electoral tribunals. They will continue intimidating the press, they will continue to detain political parties to register themselves".

==== Campaign spending ====
Noboa was fined more than $2 million for exceeding campaign spending limits in 2002. Noboa spent $2.3 million in his campaign, 98% above limit. The fine equaled twice the excess. In 2004, he offered to pay not with cash but with financial instruments which would lose up to half their face value when exchanged. Ecuador's Supreme Electoral Tribunal, the agency responsible for enforcing campaign spending law accepted Noboa's terms. The Supreme Electoral Tribunal was first headed by Nicanor Moscoso, a member of Noboa's party and his former campaign treasurer, and then by Wilson Sanchez, co-founder of Noboa's party and his personal friend.
