= Lucio Gutiérrez =

43rd President of Ecuador (2003–2005)

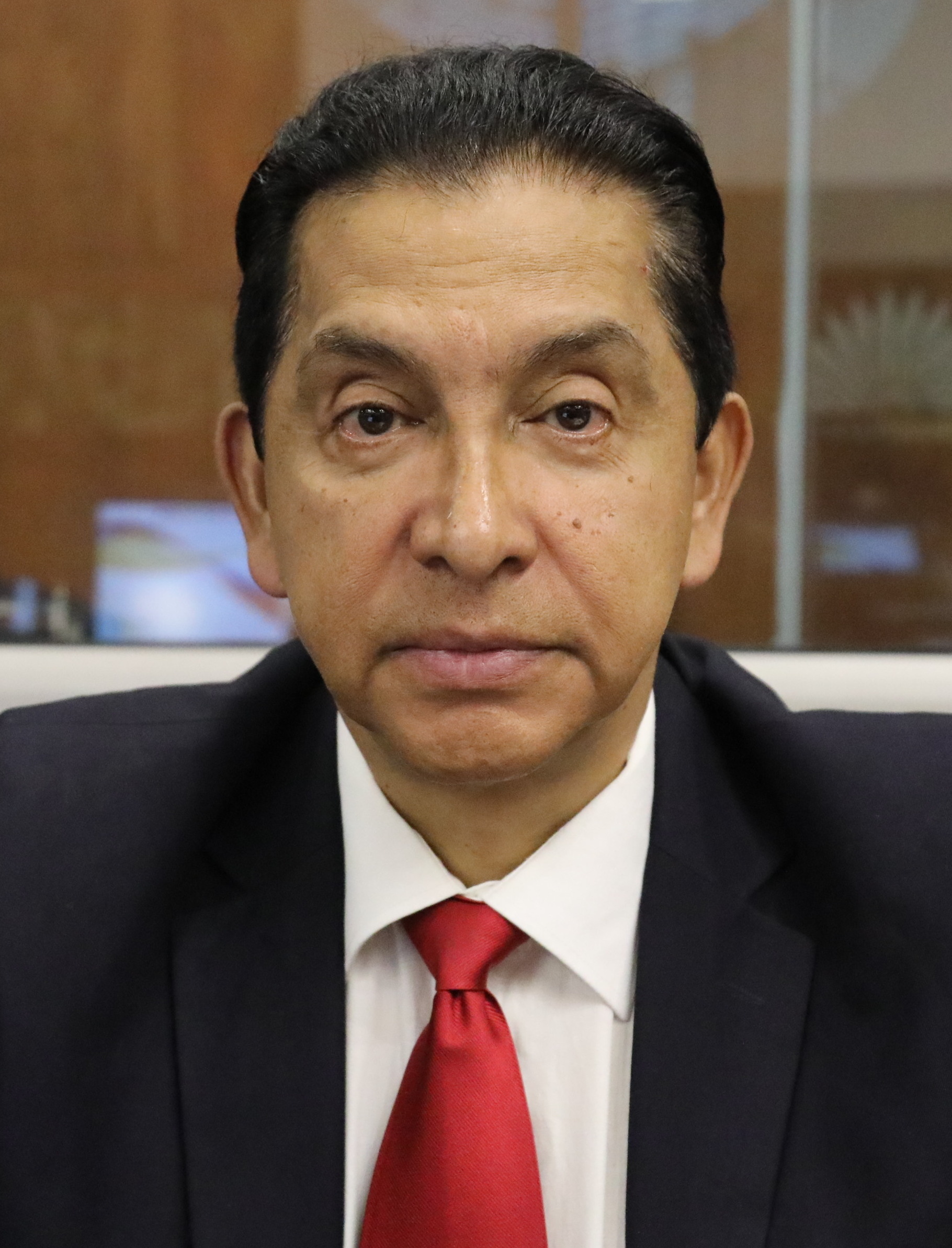
- Gutiérrez in 2023

43rd President of Ecuador
- In office 15 January 2003 – 20 April 2005
- Vice President: Alfredo Palacio
- Preceded by: Gustavo Noboa
- Succeeded by: Alfredo Palacio

Member of the National Assembly
- In office 17 November 2023 – 13 May 2025
- Constituency: National constituency

Personal details
- Born: Lucio Edwin Gutiérrez Borbúa; 23 March 1957 (age 69) Quito, Ecuador
- Party: Patriotic Society Party
- Spouse: Ximena Bohórquez (m. 1982)
- Education: Escuela Politécnica del Ejército

Military service
- Allegiance: Ecuador
- Branch: Ecuadorian Army
- Years of service: 1972–2000
- Rank: Colonel

Lucio Edwin Gutiérrez Borbúa (born 23 March 1957) is an Ecuadorian politician and former military officer who served as the 43rd president of Ecuador from 2003 until his impeachment in 2005. In 2023, he was elected to the National Assembly.

== Early life ==
Lucio Edwin Gutiérrez Borbua was born on 23 March 1957 in Quito. He was raised in Tena, an Amazon basin town. He was the son of a traveling salesman and attended primary and secondary school in Tena before transferring at age 15 to a military college in Quito. Gutiérrez graduated from the Army Polytechnic School as a civil engineer after having won honor's for academic and athletic prowess. He later studied in Brazil and the United States.

Gutiérrez rose steadily through the army ranks. In 1990–92 he served with the United Nations observer mission to Nicaragua. As a young man, he demonstrated little interest in politics, but during the 1990s he sympathized with fellow Ecuadorians as they became increasingly disenchanted with corruption and poverty. In 1997, as aide-de-camp to Pres. Abdalá Bucaram Ortiz, he refused an order to use force against a crowd outside the presidential palace. Bucaram fled the palace and was later removed from office by the National Congress. In 1999 Gutiérrez repeatedly questioned the government's conduct and pointedly refused to shake Pres. Jamil Mahuad Witt's hand during a public ceremony in December.

== Political rise ==
Gutiérrez entered the national spotlight during the 2000 Ecuadorian coup d'état that unseated President Jamil Mahuad for three hours and forced him to abandon office after demonstrations in Quito by thousands of Indigenous Ecuadorians protested the Mahuad government's support of neoliberal economic policies, particularly the proposed dollarization plans. Instead of ordering to disperse the protesters, then Col. Gutiérrez and the army stood aside and let them take over the National Congress of Ecuador.

Under pressure from the United States, and lacking support from the indigenous movement, the Junta was dissolved by General Carlos Mendoza and the Congress named then Vice President Gustavo Noboa as president of the country. The armed forces jailed Gutiérrez for six months, but he was discharged, and faced no criminal prosecution despite the fact he was a direct participant.

Prior to the 2000 coup, Gutiérrez was aide-de-camp to former presidents Abdalá Bucaram and Fabián Alarcón. He claimed that, during the demonstrations that unseated Bucaram in February 1997, he also disobeyed orders to protect Carondelet Palace, leaving Bucaram no other choice but to leave.

== Presidency (2003–2005) ==
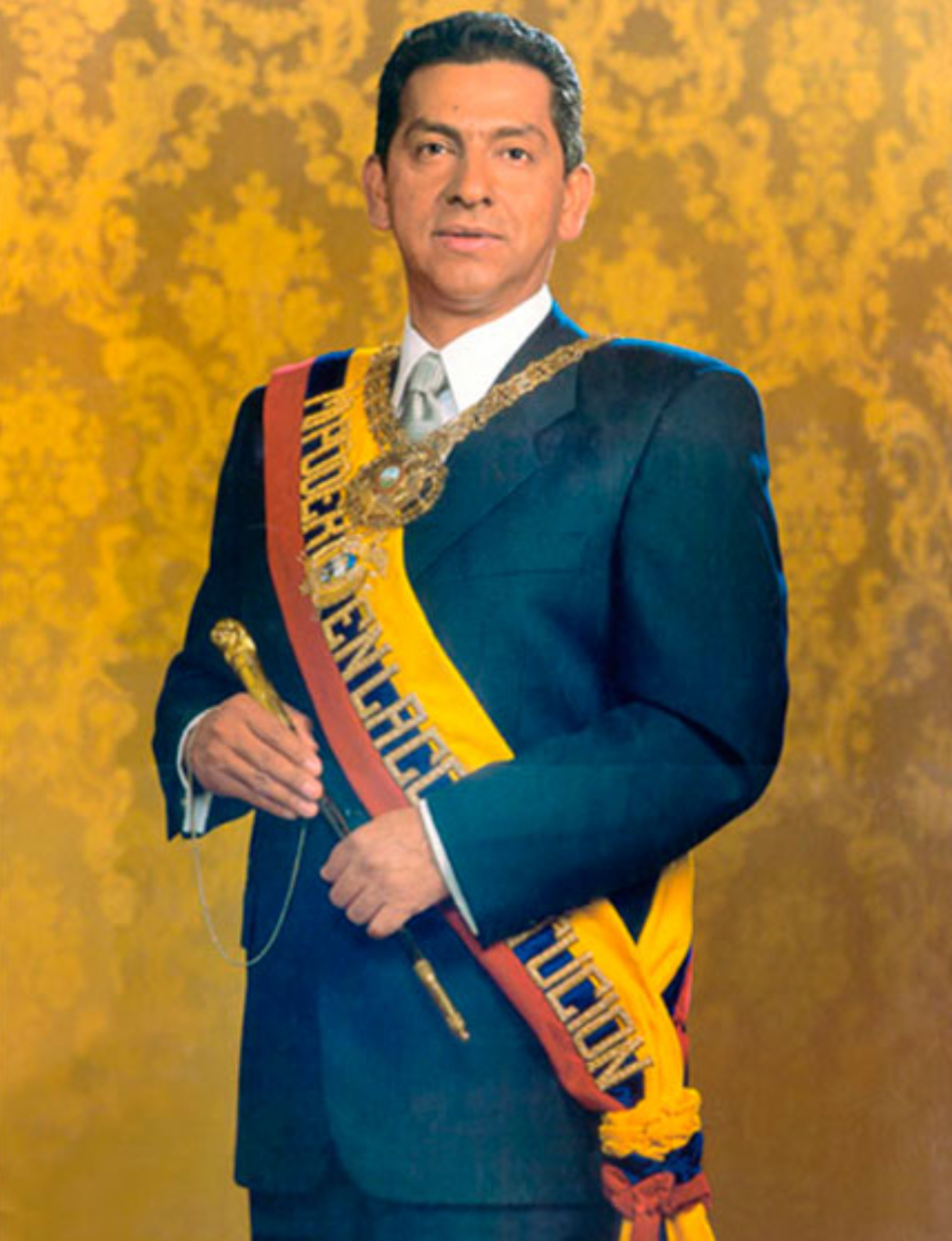
- Lucio Gutiérrez; 15 January 2003 – 20 April 2005
- Vice President: Alfredo Palacio (2003–2005)
- Election: 2002
- Seat: Carondelet Palace

Gutiérrez ran for President in 2002 as the candidate of the January 21 Patriotic Society Party (PSP), named for the date of the 2000 protest, and the Pachakutik Movement, on a platform of fighting corruption and reversing neoliberal economic reforms. He defeated banana magnate and wealthiest man in Ecuador, Álvaro Noboa, in the second round with 55% of the popular vote, through a partnership with the leftist and indigenous movement parties, Democratic People's Movement (Movimiento Popular Democratico/MPD) and Pachacutik, respectively.

Gutiérrez alienated many of his supporters by supporting the Free Trade Area of the Americas (FTAA) and by keeping the status-quo on economic issues. After three months of government, Gutiérrez broke his alliance with leftist parties and reached an agreement with the Social Christian Party (Partido Social Cristiano/PSC), continuing the economic policies of its predecessors and increasing bonds with the United States. The government received increased frequent accusations of corruption and nepotism. After two years, Gutiérrez broke the agreement with the PSC, further weakening the government politically.

In November 2004 his former left-wing supporters joined with the conservative PSC in launching an effort to impeach him on various charges. Gutiérrez was accused of embezzlement by the PSC for using funds, resources and public property in favor of PSP candidates in the elections of 2004, and by the Democratic Left (Ecuador) (Izquierda Democrática/ID), MPD and Pachakutik for jeopardizing the security of the state for literally inciting the people to burn the courts. Impeachment proceedings collapsed when two legislators broke party lines, and a majority (51) votes could not be reached to continue the proceedings.

In December 2004, Gutiérrez alleged that the Supreme Court of Justice was biased in favor of the PSC. His political party, PSP, together with the Institutional Renewal Party of National Action (Partido Renovador Institucional de Acción Nacional/PRIAN) of Álvaro Noboa, the Ecuadorian Roldosist Party (Partido Roldosista Ecuatoriano/PRE) of Abdalá Bucaram, independents, and MPD, voted in the Congress for the reorganization of the Supreme Court of Justice via majority resolution. His adversaries sustained that the Constitution gives autonomy to the judicial branch and does not authorize Congress to interfere in the judiciary by removing or nominating judges. Judges were replaced by allies to PRE, PRIAN and PSP political parties with the clear intention of dropping criminal charges against former president Abdalá Bucaram, accused of several acts of corruption during his presidency which led to his exile in Panama from 1997 until April 2005.

=== Crisis ===
On 15 April 2005, amid a growing political crisis and protests in Quito against the Government, President Gutiérrez declared a state of emergency in Quito and revoked the newly appointed Supreme Court of Justice. This was a controversial move that provoked conflicting reactions and was seen by analysts as a dictatorial act. The state of emergency was lifted on 16 April, as the State of Emergency was disobeyed by citizens and General Aguas of the army, who refused to enforce it, and Ecuador's Congress was expected to hold a session in order to decide whether to ratify the Supreme Court's dismissal.

On 20 April 2005, following a week of massive demonstrations, the Congress of Ecuador (meeting in a special session in a private building, CIESPAL, with opposition delegates only), on the grounds that Gutiérrez had abandoned his constitutional duties, voted 60–2 (38 members, including the great majority of PRE/PRIAN/PSP deputies, did not vote) to remove Gutiérrez from office and appointed Vice President Alfedo Palacio González to serve as President. At the same time, the Ecuadorian Joint Armed Forces Command (Comando Conjunto de las Fuerzas Armadas) publicly expressed that they were withdrawing their support for Gutiérrez, who had no option but to leave the Presidential Palace on a helicopter. He sought political asylum in the house of the Brazilian Ambassador in the north of Quito, after his attempt to leave the city aboard a plane at Quito International Airport was thwarted by hundreds of angry protesters that breached airport security and blocked the airstrip

The removal of the justices of Ecuador’s Supreme Court was subsequently challenged before the Inter-American Commission on Human Rights. The justices of the Supreme Court and the Constitutional Tribunal were represented by professors Ramiro Ávila Santamaría (who would subsequently serve as a judge of the Constitutional Court of Ecuador) and David Cordero Heredia (Yale School of the Environment). The proceedings ultimately reached the Inter-American Court of Human Rights, which held Ecuador internationally responsible for violations of the former justices’ rights and ordered the State to provide reparations, including a monetary compensation. Hernán Salgado Pesantes, a former judge of both the Constitutional Court of Ecuador and the Inter-American Court of Human Rights, criticized the amount of compensation.

=== Approval rating ===
Gutierrez began his presidency with an approval rating of 64%. Gutierrez left office with a 32% approval rating, according to a CEDATOS survey.

== Post-Presidency ==
Brazil offered Gutiérrez asylum and arranged air transport out of Ecuador for the former president. He arrived via Rio Branco on 24 April 2005. He renounced his asylum, then went to Peru and the United States. In September he was reported to be seeking political asylum in Colombia. This was offered on 4 October only to be refused by Gutiérrez on 13 October. Then on 15 October he voluntarily returned to Ecuador vowing to "use all legal and constitutional means to retake power." He was arrested at the Eloy Alfaro International Airport in Manta, after arriving in a chartered SARPA plane with his brother, Gilmar Gutiérrez, his companion-in-arms Fausto Cobo, and some collaborators. He was taken to a prison in Quito and locked in a maximum security cell on charges of attempting to subvert Ecuador's internal security by repeatedly proclaiming to the international media that he continued to be the legitimate President of the Republic of Ecuador.

On 3 March 2006, a judge in Ecuador dismissed the charges against Gutiérrez. A very notorious political agreement ensued between Gutiérrez and the PSC. Gutiérrez and the deputies of PSP sided with the PSC in order to gain a majority for controlling the country's Constitutional Court. Upon his release, Gutiérrez thanked the Ecuadorian people for their support and vowed that he would participate and win the presidential election in October.

On 15 October 2006, his PSP, led by Gilmar Gutiérrez, got the third place in the national election with 17% of the total votes, with the support of the economically disadvantaged, landless farmers and indigenous population.

In the 2009 Presidential Election, Lucio Gutiérrez ran for president of Ecuador under the flag of PSP. In the presidential election held on 26 April, he came in second with 26.8% of the vote, losing to Rafael Correa. Lucio Gutiérrez declared election fraud even though all the polls conducted well before election day gave a great advantage to Rafael Correa, and even when international observers from the European Union declared total transparency of the election process.

He again ran for president in 2021, obtaining 1.8% of the vote.

== Post-Election ==
Almost all supporters of Lucio Gutiérrez are in the Amazon region where he was born. This relationship has been used by his political party to gain the support of inhabitants of these isolated areas. Gutiérrez has said he will form a parallel cabinet to that of President Rafael Correa so that if the "people give him the opportunity, he will have an experienced cabinet."

=== Attempted coup ===
He is alleged to have instigated the 2010 police revolt against Correa. He has fervently denied the allegations claiming that he was in Washington D.C. attending an event at the Inter-American Defense College (of which he is an alumnus), then traveled to Miami to attend a conference on the Socialism of the 21st century and finally to serve as an observer in the Brazilian presidential poll. He has further stated that the whole event was fabricated.

A special commission formed by Correa in 2013 to investigate the events has claimed that he and his party plotted, along with the fugitive Isaias brothers (former owners of Filanbanco who reside in Miami after fleeing during the 1998–1999 banking crisis), former chief of intelligence Mario Pazmiño (accused by Correa of working with the CIA and of being involved in the Colombian attack against Ecuadorian territory in 2008 which killed FARC leader Raúl Reyes and sparked a regional crisis) as well as others.

Government offices
Preceded by Gustavo Noboa	President of Ecuador; 15 January 2003 – April 20, 2005	Succeeded by Alfedo Palacio González
