= Institutional Renewal Party of National Action =

Defunct political party in Ecuador

Institutional Renewal Party of National Action Partido Renovador Institucional de Acción Nacional
- Leader: Álvaro Noboa
- Founded: 2002
- Dissolved: 2014
- Succeeded by: Partido Adelante Ecuatoriano Adelante
- Ideology: Populism
- Political position: Centre-right
- Colors: Yellow and Blue

Website
- http://www.alvaronoboaprian.com/

The Institutional Renewal Party of National Action (Spanish: Partido Renovador Institucional de Acción Nacional, PRIAN) was a centre-right, populist political party in Ecuador.

At the legislative elections on 20 October 2002, the Party won 10 out of 100 seats. Its presidential candidate, Álvaro Noboa, the wealthiest man in Ecuador, won 17.4% of the vote in the presidential elections on the same day, but was defeated in the second round. At the October 2006 elections, Noboa was the party's presidential candidate again. This time, he came in first place in the first round, winning 26% of the vote, but he lost again the runoff, this time against Rafael Correa. At the Ecuadorian National Assembly elections, the Party won 28 of the 100 seats and became the largest party in Congress.

In 1998, Álvaro Noboa became the outside runner in the presidential elections. He achieved a technical draw with the man who then became the President of Ecuador. Álvaro's popularity was left unscathed, and on 20 September 2002 all polling companies with the exception of one predicted that Noboa would have become President of Ecuador if the elections had been held on that day.

In 2002, Noboa inspired and guided the foundation of the PRIAN political Party. The party was an immediate success after it was established and gained ten seats in Congress in less than six months.

During the last presidential campaign, Álvaro Noboa's mission was consistent with his career path and life. The mission stated the need to fight corruption, reactivate the economy, provide jobs for all Ecuadorians, promote low-income housing for all citizens, establish a national health plan and implement an educational plan. Today, Álvaro Noboa is seen as a political, economic and social leader in Ecuador. On this last presidential campaign, the second one in his political career, he lost with a small percentage to Coronel Lucio Gutierrez. Again there was talk of fraud in these elections.

Álvaro Noboa has structured his PRIAN Political Party in such a way that today it is the second leading force insofar as votes are concerned among a field of fourteen political parties. The man who instituted public service with the use of his own funds has kept his "Medical Brigades" in a ceaseless relief effort since 1998 thus proving sincerity behind social-minded convictions. In the mid-term elections of 2004 the PRIAN Party got 19 mayors of different cities of Ecuador elected as well as 1 prefect and more than 70 council-members in different provinces. Álvaro Noboa, as leader of the PRIAN Party, campaigned in favor of these elected dignitaries.

For a third time, Álvaro Noboa ran for president representing the PRIAN political party, registering his candidacy in the supreme electoral tribunal on 15 August 2006. With a liberal democratic and social justice platform, openness to foreign investment an ambitious housing plan, which as a whole, would multiply employment with an emphasis on the quality of health and education, Álvaro Noboa won the first electoral round in November 2006 and turned his party, the PRIAN, into the leading electoral presence in the country. With 27 elected members of congress the PRIAN obtained the right to place the president of congress from among its ranks.

On 2 May 2012, Noboa publicly announced that he would be running for a fifth time to become the President of Ecuador in the upcoming 2013 Ecuadorian Presidential Elections. Noboa warned that Rafael Correa's Government "will continue to use the IRS to bring to bankruptcy Bananera Noboa and not allow to defend itself in court as it shall be done. They will keep controlling 100% of the electoral tribunals. They will continue intimidating the press, they will continue to detain political parties to register themselves".

In 2013, Ecuadorian general election Noboa's candidacy received only 3.72% of the votes, with PRIAN party taking 3% of the votes for National Assembly, losing them 7 seats.

In 2014, PRIAN was one of the four political parties that had their legal status revoked by Consejo Nacional Electoral (CNE, national electoral council) for failing to win at least 4% of the popular vote in two consecutive national elections according to Article 327 of the 2010 electoral code. The CNE took the combined results of the February 2013 general election and the February 2014 municipal elections to reach this verdict.
