= Timeline of LGBTQ history in Ecuador =

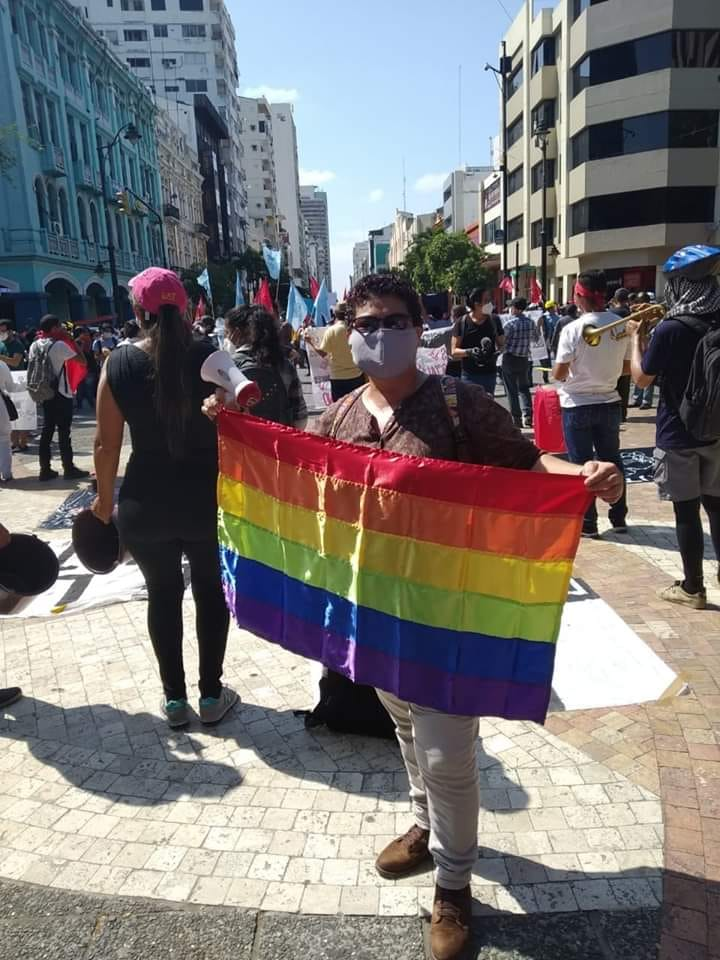
LGBT activist during a protest in Ecuador in 2020.

This article presents a timeline of the most relevant events in the history of LGBT people in Ecuador. The earliest manifestations of lesbian, gay, bisexual, and transgender (LGBT) people in Ecuador were in the pre-Columbian era, in cultures such as Valdivia, Tumaco-La Tolita, and Bahía, of which evidence has been found suggesting that homosexuality was common among its members. Documents by Hispanic chroniclers and historians—such as Pedro Cieza de León, Gonzalo Fernández de Oviedo y Valdés, and Garcilaso de la Vega—point to the Manteño-Huancavilca culture in particular as one in which homosexuality was openly practiced and accepted. However, with the Spanish conquest, a system of repression was established against anyone who practiced homosexuality in the territories that currently make up Ecuador.

Homosexuality remained absent from the Ecuadorian Criminal Code until 1871, when it was classified for the first time as a crime with a penalty of four to eight years in prison. During the subsequent decades, there was little mention of the subject, mainly due to the criminalization of homosexuality and the conservatism present in Ecuadorian society at the time. A noticeable change took place in the late 1970s, when waves of migration to major cities and the effect of events such as the Stonewall riots caused an increase in the visibility of LGBT people, who began to hold informal meetings that would lead to the birth of an Ecuadorian gay community. However, these activities led to a spike in police repression, mainly during the administration of León Febres-Cordero Ribadeneyra (1984–1988).

The event that marked the turning point in LGBT rights activism was the raid on the Bar Abanicos, a gay bar in the city of Cuenca that was the subject of police intervention in June 1997 and where dozens of people were arrested, and then tortured and raped. The event sparked criticism nationwide and led the various LGBT groups in the country to unite for the first time in a single front, in order to demand the decriminalization of homosexuality and organize the first marches and public demonstrations of LGBT people in the history of Ecuador. Finally, on 25 November 1997, the Constitutional Court decriminalized homosexuality.

The first years of the 21st century were characterized by greater visibility and social acceptance of sexual diversity. With the implementation of the 2008 Constitution, LGBT people witnessed progress being made regarding their rights, such as the legalization of de facto unions between persons of the same sex. Recent years have brought more advances in favor of the demands of LGBT groups, with several of them obtained through rulings of the Constitutional Court, such as Case 0011-18-CN and Case 10-18-CN, decided on 12 June 2019 and through which same-sex marriage was legalized in Ecuador.

== Before the 20th century ==
There is archaeological evidence, as well as chronicles, of homosexuality being practiced openly—before the Spanish conquest—among the pre-Columbian peoples that inhabited what is now Ecuador. Ceramics have been found from the Valdivia culture that showed this type of relationship as part of its representations of eroticism and fertility. Everything changed with the arrival of the Europeans, who imposed a negative view of homosexuality based on their Catholic beliefs.

=== 1594 ===
- 11 October: Andrés Cupín, former slave of doctor Manuel Barros de San Millán—who until the previous year had held the position of president of the Real Audiencia of Quito—is executed in Lima by garrotte vil after having been accused of the sin of sodomy committed with Barros. In turn, Barros was sentenced in 1597 to the payment of 7,000 ducats and banishment from the Indies.

=== 1837 ===
- The first Criminal Code of Ecuador was issued, which did not include sanctions for homosexual relations.

=== 1871 ===
- A new Criminal Code was issued to criminalize homosexuality in Ecuador for the first time, specifically male homosexuality, which was referred to as "sodomy." Article 401 of this Code stated:

In cases of sodomy, the guilty parties shall be sentenced to a prison term of four to eight years when no violence or threats are involved; eight to 12 years when one of these circumstances is involved; and an extraordinary prison term when the victim is a minor.

== 20th century ==
=== 1926 ===
- 26 April: Loja-born writer Pablo Palacio published his short story Un hombre muerto a puntapiés (The Man Who Was Kicked to Death) in Hélice magazine—the first cuadorian literary work to openly deal with the subject of homosexuality.

=== 1938 ===
- Article 491 of the Criminal Code of this year changed the crime of sodomy to that of "homosexuality," and thus broadened the definition to include lesbian relations. The article would later be moved to paragraph 516. Its first subsection reads as follows:

In cases of homosexuality that do not constitute rape, the two persons who are jointly responsible shall be punished with maximum-term imprisonment of four to eight years.

=== 1963 ===
- 17 December: A young homosexual man named Wilfrido Villamar died in Quito after being shot twice by poet and diplomat Francisco Granizo, in an alleged incident of jealousy resulting from a love triangle between them and another man. The case received intense negative attention from the press in subsequent months, and figures such as Alejandro Carrión made public calls to clean up "the homosexual decay" of society. When making arrests, the police forced detainees to provide a list of about 400 alleged homosexual persons, whose names were then published in the country's major newspapers as a form of ridicule. As a result, many of those mentioned lost their jobs, while others had to flee the country.

=== 1972 ===
- 26 November: The first gender-affirming surgery in the history of Ecuador was performed on this date, although it was not made public. It was performed at a clinic in Guayaquil on a trans woman named Sandra Inés Ortiz.

=== 1979 ===
- Recently appointed Police Chief of Guayas—and future president—Abdalá Bucaram launched a campaign of public ridicule against people he considered morally reprehensible. Shortly after taking office, he carried out a police raid in Guayaquil in which he arrested female sex workers, gay men, and trans women. He then called on citizens to take to the streets and forced detainees to walk 25 blocks from the Cuartel Modelo police station to the Municipal Palace, while citizens who were present along the path hurled insults and objects at them.

=== 1982 ===
- Quito writer Javier Vásconez published his short story Angelote, amor mío (Angelote, my love) as part of his book of short stories Ciudad lejana (Distant City) The theme of the story, which describes the wake of a homosexual character and criticizes the hypocrisy and double standards of society at the time, generated strong controversy in Quito in the 1980s, which led the Ministry of Education to ban reading the story in educational institutions.

=== 1984 ===
- Guayaquil Mayor Abdalá Bucaram took part in a police raid in which ten LGBT people were arrested. After the arrest, Bucaram personally beat the detainees with a whip.
- August: The first case of HIV/AIDS in Ecuador is detected in Guayaquil.
- 4 September: In an event described by the press as "unprecedented," a group of 14 homosexual persons detained by the police appeared before Quito Mayor Gustavo Herdoíza to request a writ of habeas corpus and denounce extortion and torture.

=== 1985 ===
- 23 May: Conservative President León Febres-Cordero Ribadeneyra created the escuadrones volantes (mobile squads), a group of special police forces that perpetrated human rights violations and acts of torture until it was dissolved in 1988. Among the targeted groups were LGBT people, particularly trans women, who were often beaten, raped, and tortured by the squads.

=== 1986 ===
- Activist Orlando Montoya was interviewed on Channel 4, where he denounced hate crimes against gender-diverse persons and the impunity regarding these cases. This made him the first LGBT person to appear on Ecuadorian television to denounce cases of homophobia. As a result of his participation in the interview, Montoya was arrested by the police.
- 25 December: The group Entre Amigos (Among Friends) was created. It was led by Orlando Montoya and considered one of the first LGBT groups in the country to decry human rights violations against LGBT people, apart from promoting campaigns for the prevention of HIV/AIDS. It later became the SOGA (Sociedad Gay; Gay Society) collective—later on, the FEDAEPS (Fundación Ecuatoriana de Ayuda, Educación y Prevención del Sida). (Note: English: Ecuadorian Foundation of Help, Education, and Prevention of AIDS)

=== 1989 ===
- SOGA launched the publication En directo. Boletín lésbico gay (Live. Gay Lesbian Bulletin), where it published news related to sexual diversity and the fight for LGBT rights.

=== 1992 ===
- 9 January: The Ecuadorian Police captured Juan Fernando Hermosa—known as Niño del Terror (Child of Terror)—a serial killer who murdered at least ten gay men and who had caused panic among the LGBT population in Quito.

=== 1994 ===
- The Inter-American Commission on Human Rights required Ecuador to comply with international treaties regarding the respect and protection of gender-diverse persons, after receiving complaints about instances of police abuse in the country.

=== 1995 ===
- 15 August: The nonprofit organization Fundación Amigos por la Vida (Famivida, Friends for Life Foundation), the first LGBT organization in Guayaquil, was created.

=== 1997 ===
- 14 June: The National Police of Ecuador carried out a raid on Bar Abanicos, a gay bar located in Cuenca, where it arrested around 63 people, many of whom were subsequently tortured and abused. The case led various sectors of the gender-diverse population to organize for the first time in the country and hold events to demand the decriminalization of homosexuality.
- 27 August: Human rights organizations, gay men, and trans women, mainly organized through the Coccinelle Association, held a march in Quito—that ended at Independence Square—to demand the decriminalization of homosexuality. This was the first march of gender-diverse persons in the history of Ecuador.
- 17 September: The first public demonstration of LGBT people in the history of Guayaquil took place in the city as part of the struggle to achieve the decriminalization of homosexuality in the country.
- 25 November: The Constitutional Court issued a ruling in Case 111-97-TC, which decriminalized homosexuality in Ecuador by unanimously repealing the first clause of Article 516 of the Criminal Code, that is, the one that criminalized homosexuality with a sentence of four to eight years of imprisonment. The decision was published in the Official Gazette two days later.

=== 1998 ===
- The sitcom Mis adorables entenados con billete (My adorable stepchildren with money) premiered this year. It was the first Ecuadorian television program to include a homosexual character, although it reinforced negative stereotypes.
- The 1998 Constitution of Ecuador was approved, which prohibited, for the first time, to discriminate based on sexual orientation. The first subsection of article 23 states:

All persons shall be considered equal and shall enjoy the same rights, freedoms, and opportunities, without discrimination on grounds of birth, age, sex, ethnicity, skin color, social origin, language, religion, political affiliation, economic status, sexual orientation, health status, disability, or difference of any other kind.

- 28 June: The first LGBT pride parade in the history of the country took place in Quito.

== 21st century ==
=== 2000 ===
- 28 June: Around 300 people, organized by the Famivida foundation, attempted to hold the first LGBT pride parade in Guayaquil but the event was disrupted by a group of 60 police officers who launched tear gas at them.

=== 2002 ===
- 26 July: Several countries, including Ecuador, signed the Andean Charter for the Promotion and Protection of Human Rights in Guayaquil, which recognized sexual orientation as a category protected against discrimination.
- November: The first edition of The Place Without Limits International LGBT Film Festival was held this month.

=== 2003 ===
- 23 January: Voces de la diversidad (Voices of Diversity), the first LGBT radio program in the history of the country, premiered on Radio La Luna ratio station.

=== 2005 ===
- Juan Sebastián López, Ecuadorian participant and eventual winner of reality show Gran Hermano del Pacífico, came out as gay on the program and was a part of the first same-sex kiss in the history of Ecuadorian television.
- 23 June: Political party Ruptura de los 25 published a communiqué vindicating LGBT rights, making it the first Ecuadorian political organization to publicly support the demands of the LGBT community.
- September: Guayaquil-born writer Sonia Manzano Vela published her novel Eses fatales, considered the first lesbian novel written by an Ecuadorian woman.
- October: The novel Salvo el calvario, by writer Lucrecia Maldonado, won the Aurelio Espinosa Pólit National Literature Award. The novel was one of the first Ecuadorian literary works to take a positive look at same-sex relationships.

=== 2007 ===
- The Civil Registry Office updated its instructions for the issuance of identity cards to transgender persons following the case of Gabriela Salazar, a trans woman who had protested against the institution's refusal to change her birth name to a female name and for trying to force her to remove her make-up to pose for the photograph on her identity document. The case set a precedent for trans women in similar situations.
- On the occasion of the 2007 Constituent Assembly election, openly LGBT people ran for elected office for the first time in the country, such as Mabell García, Any Argudo, Óscar Ugarte, Elizabeth Vásquez, Francisco Guayasamín, and Thalía Álvarez.
- December: The Metropolitan Council of Quito approved Ordinance 240 against the discrimination of LGBT people, making Quito the first city in the country to approve regulations in favor of gender-diverse persons.

=== 2008 ===
- 25 June: The city of Manta held its first LGBT Pride Parade.
- 28 June: Guayaquil held its first LGBT pride parade.
- 20 October: The 2008 Constitution of Ecuador added gender identity to the list of categories protected against discrimination. In addition, the constitution legalized de facto unions for same-sex couples. Article 68 states:

The stable and monogamous union between two persons, free of marriage ties, who form a de facto couple, for the duration and under the conditions and circumstances established by law, shall generate the same rights and obligations as held by families constituted by marriage.

=== 2009 ===
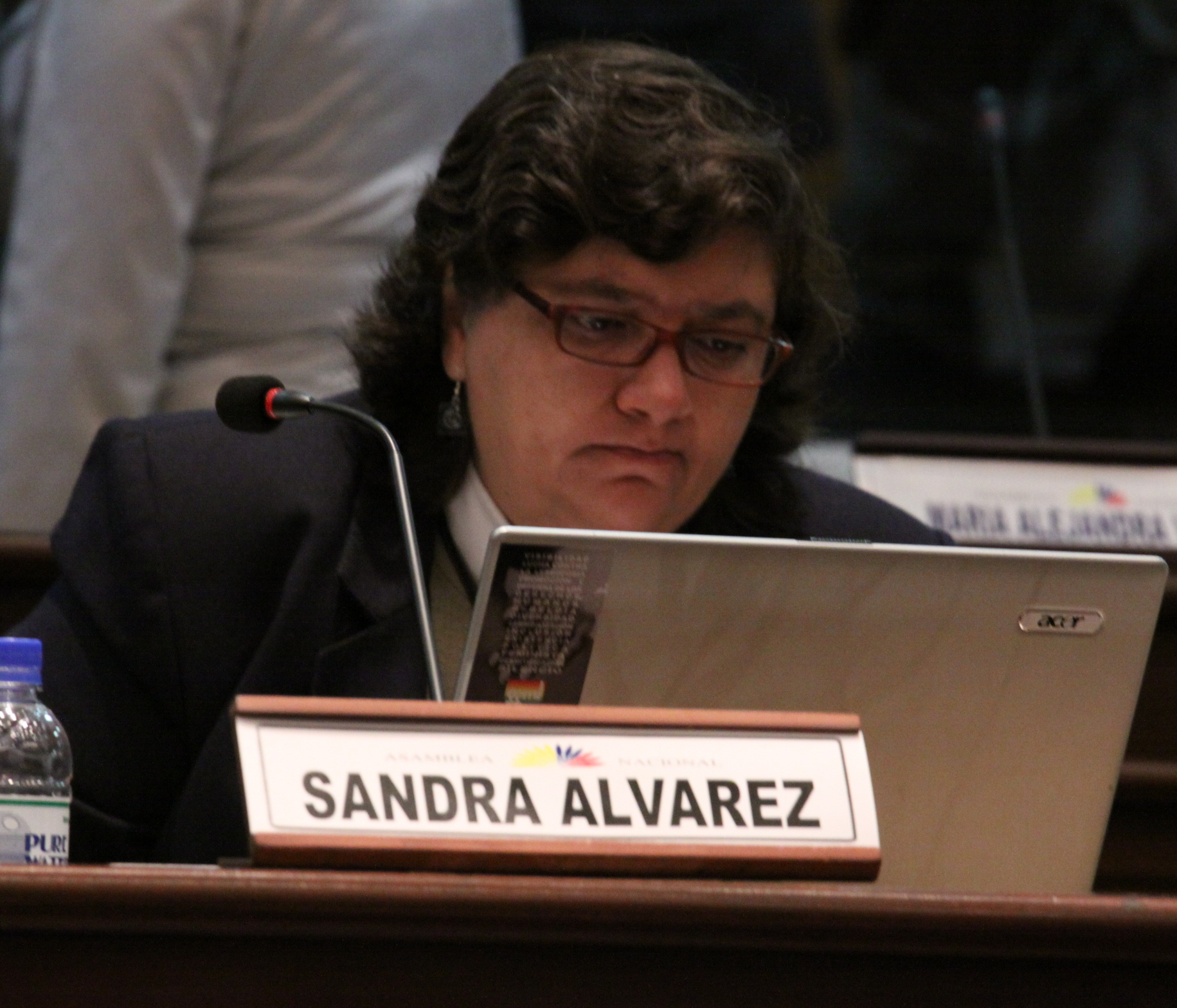
Sandra Álvarez, first openly LGBT person elected as alternate assembly member.

- February: The Legislative and Oversight Commission amended the Code of Criminal Procedure to introduce, among other criminal offenses, the figure of hate crimes against LGBT people.
- 26 April: Activist Sandra Álvarez Monsalve is elected as an alternate member of the National Assembly for the 2009–2013 term, making her the first openly lesbian woman in the country to achieve this position.
- 12 August: The first de facto union of a same-sex couple is registered in a notary's office in Quito. The couple chose to keep their identity confidential.
- 22 October: After a long court battle, Estrella Estévez became the first trans woman in the country's history to change her gender marker to female on her identity document.

=== 2010 ===
- 10 December: The marriage of Joey Hateley and Hugo Vera—a couple made up of a trans man and a cisgender man—is held in Quito. The marriage was officiated by City Councilor Norman Wray Reyes. It was possible because Hateley still had his gender marker as female on his identity documents and thus there were no legal restrictions applicable. National and international media outlets described the event as the country's "first gay wedding."

=== 2011 ===
- The Ecuadorian Institute of Social Security agreed for the first time to grant the corresponding pension and benefits to the same-sex partner of a woman who had died. It also stated that it would do the same in the future for people in similar situations.
- March: Activist and politician Humberto Mata Espinel became the first Ecuadorian public figure to marry a person of the same sex. The wedding took place in Argentina.

=== 2012 ===
- January: Carina Vance, the former director of lesbian rights organization Causana, was appointed as the minister of public health of Ecuador, making her the first openly gay person to hold a ministerial office.
- 11 May: The Ministry of Public Health issued ministerial decision 767, which established the prohibition for the operation of centers that perform sexual conversion therapy.

=== 2013 ===
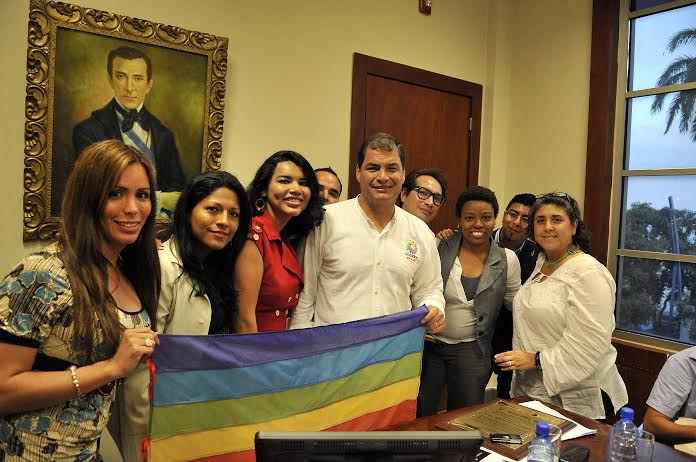
Meeting of LGBT activists with President Rafael Correa.

- During the 2013 presidential elections, candidates Alberto Acosta Espinosa and Norman Wray Reyes publicly expressed their position in favor of legalizing same-sex marriage.
- 8 June: The city of Portoviejo held its first LGBT Pride Parade.
- June: The Kidnapping of Zulema Constante, a young lesbian woman who was kidnapped by her family and sent to a conversion therapy clinic in the Ecuadorian Amazon rainforest, where she was tortured in an attempt to change her sexual orientation, caused international uproar. The incident was decried by celebrities such as Puerto Rican singer Ricky Martin, who described the incident as "a horror movie."
- 13 December: For the first time in history, LGBT activists held an official meeting with an Ecuadorian president, in this case with Rafael Correa.

=== 2014 ===
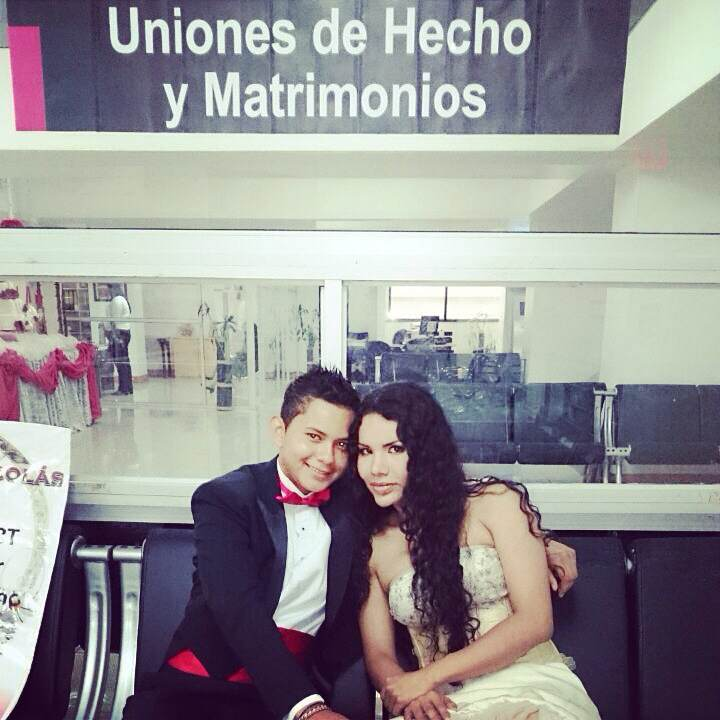
Diane Rodríguez and her partner minutes before the registration of their common-law marriage (15 September 2014).

- 28 January: The National Assembly approved the Comprehensive Organic Criminal Code. It included a subsection that defined sex or gender conversion or reorientation therapies as an aggravating circumstance of the crime of torture.
- 23 June: The city of Cuenca held its first LGBT Pride Parade.
- 22 August: The Civil Registry of Ecuador issued a resolution allowing common-law unions to be registered in a person's identity card as complementary information related to marital status.

=== 2015 ===
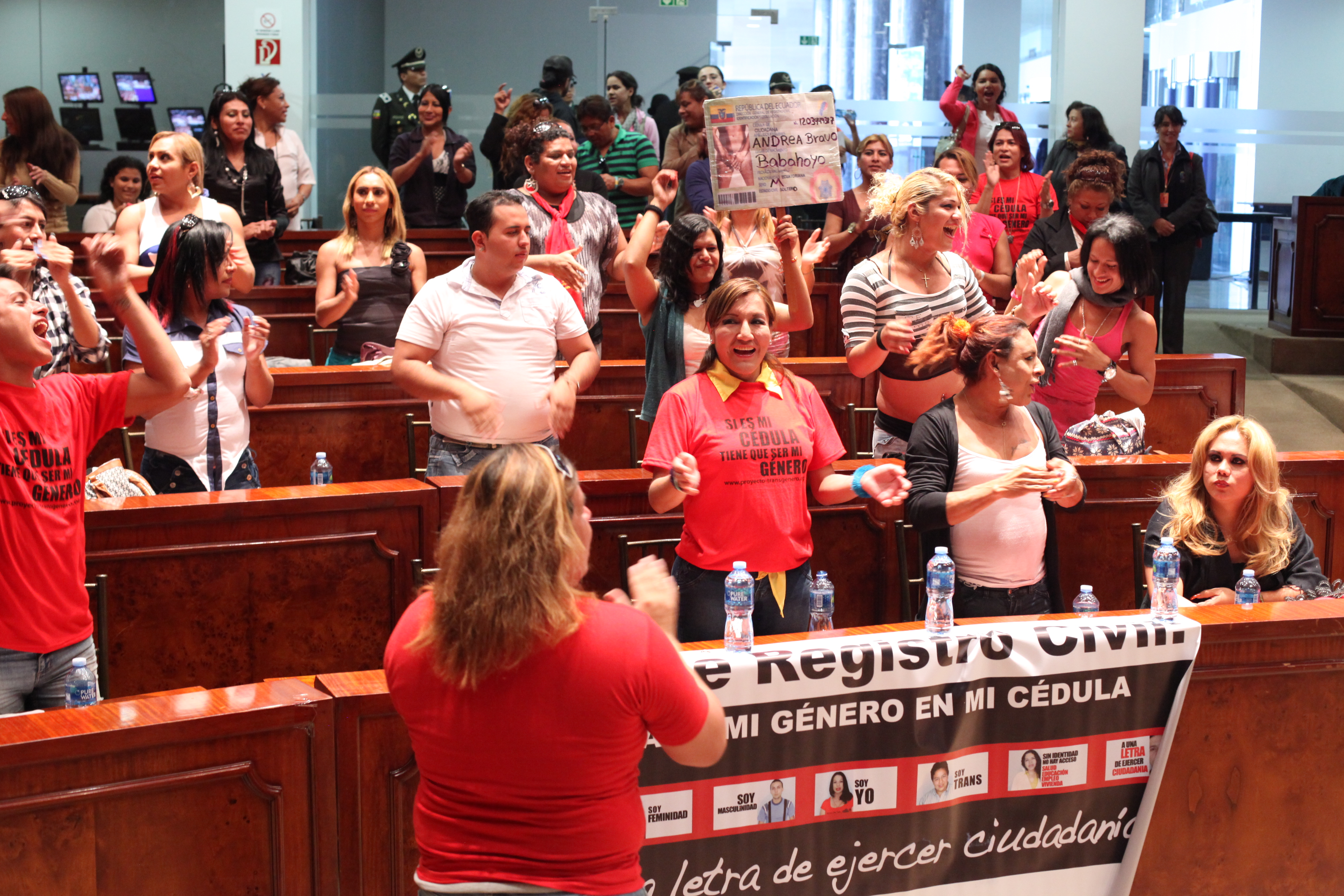
LGBT activists at the National Assembly during one of the debates on reforms to the Civil Code.

- 14 April: The National Assembly of Ecuador approved the Organic Law for Labor Justice, which includes an article that establishes economic retribution for people who are fired because of their sexual orientation.
- 21 April: The National Assembly approved a series of reforms to the Civil Code, one of which turned the concept of a de facto union or domestic partnership into a new marital status. In addition, it approved the possibility of changing the field marked gender in a person's identity card for the one they identify with, provided they are older than 18, presents a court order, and brings two witnesses to corroborate their gender identity.

=== 2016 ===
- 12 February: The Cuenca municipal council approved the "Ordinance for the inclusion, recognition, and respect for gender and sexual-gender diversity in the canton of Cuenca."
- 4 March: The Provincial Chamber of Azuay unanimously approved an ordinance that opened a registry of symbolic marriage ceremonies for same-sex couples. The first one took place on 28 June of the same year.
- 16 June: The National Assembly approved a resolution to officially declare 27 November as the National Day of Sexual-Gender Diversity.
- 22 July: The city of Quevedo held its first LGBT Pride Parade.
- 31 August: The Inter-American Court of Human Rights issued a ruling in the Flor Freire vs. Ecuador case, in which it found the country guilty of discriminating against former soldier Homero Flor Freire, who had been expelled from the Armed Forces in 2001 for allegedly having had sexual relations with another man. In its decision, the Court found that the disciplinary rule that had been applied to Flor Freire's expulsion was discriminatory, as it penalized sexual relations between men more severely than heterosexual relations.

=== 2017 ===
- During the 2017 presidential election, candidate Paco Moncayo, of the Democratic Left party, publicly expressed his position in favor of legalizing same-sex marriage.
- 19 February: Activist Diane Rodríguez was elected alternate member of the National Assembly for the 2017–2021 term, making her the first transgender person in the country to occupy that position.
- 10 May: The Constitutional Court issued a ruling in Case 0288-12-EP in favor of Bruno Paolo Calderón, a trans man who sued the State for it to recognize his gender as male. The Court ruled that both his identity card and birth certificate should be changed to state his gender as male and asked the National Assembly to amend the law to facilitate future cases.

=== 2018 ===
- 29 May: The Constitutional Court issued a ruling in Case 1692-12-EP in favor of Satya—a girl born to a lesbian couple—whose birth the Civil Registry had refused to register with the surnames of her two mothers. In its decision, the Court ordered the Civil Registry to register Satya with the surnames of her mothers, in addition to ruling that, in the future, any child conceived through assisted reproduction methods shall be registered regardless of whether they come from a heterosexual or same-sex parent household.
- 29 June: Judges Iliana Vallejo and Ruth Álvarez, from the Judicial Unit for Families, Women, Children and Adolescents of the city of Cuenca, admitted the appeal for protection of two same-sex couples who had unsuccessfully attempted to marry months earlier. The judges also declared that the principle of equality had been violated and that the Civil Registry should allow the couples to marry immediately. The Civil Registry refused and appealed the ruling.
- 29 June: The cities of Babahoyo and Zamora held their first LGBT pride parades.
- 10 September: The Tribunal of the Court of Justice of Azuay admitted the appeal of the Civil Registry and overturned the decision of judges Vallejo and Álvarez, who had ruled in favor of same-sex marriage on 29 June.
- 16 October: Judge Jorge Duarte Estévez ruled in favor of Amada, a nine-year-old trans girl whose family sued the Civil Registry for preventing her from registering her new name and gender. Amada made the changes at the Civil Registry on 27 November of the same year, becoming the first trans girl in Ecuador to successfully change her identity.

=== 2019 ===
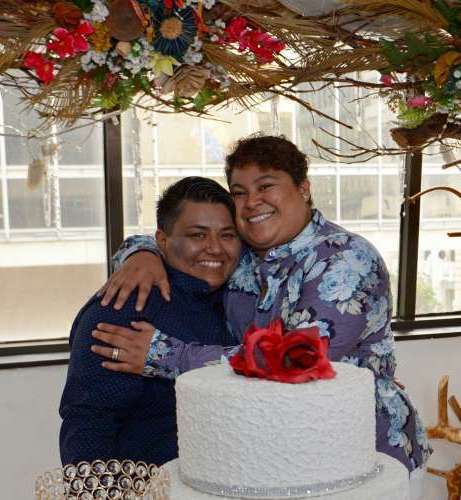
Alexandra Chávez and Michelle Avilés, first same-sex couple to get married in Ecuador.

- 12 June: The Constitutional Court issued a ruling in Case 0011-18-CN and Case 10-18-CN, legalizing same-sex marriage in Ecuador. The first case originated after the Civil Registry denied the couple made up by Efraín Soria and Javier Benalcázar the right to marry, so they took the case to the Provincial Court of Pichincha, which in turn decided to elevate the request to the Constitutional Court. Soria and Benalcázar finally got married on 31 August of that same year.
- 18 July: Michelle Avilés and Alexandra Chávez became the first same-sex couple to enter into a civil marriage in the country. The ceremony took place in the building of the Civil Registry of Guayaquil.
- 25 July: Giovanny Vareles and Borys Álvarez became the first male couple to enter into a civil marriage in Ecuador. The ceremony also took place in Guayaquil.

=== 2020 ===
- 20 November: The first National Trans March of Ecuador was held on this date.

=== 2021 ===
- 28 June: President Guillermo Lasso created the Undersecretary of Diversities, the first public institution in the country's history created with the sole purpose of addressing the problems of the LGBT community.
- 28 June: The city of Riobamba held its first LGBT Pride Parade.
- 13 July: The National Assembly of Ecuador ratified, with 126 votes in favor and 0 against, the Inter-American Convention Against All Forms of Discrimination and Intolerance, the first binding regional document that explicitly recognizes sexual orientation, gender identity, and gender expression as grounds for discrimination.
- 20 October: The Constitutional Court issued a ruling in Case 1290-18-EP in favor of Diocles García, a man who was expelled from the Armed Forces in 1991 for allegedly being homosexual. As reparation measures, the Court required the Armed Forces to apologize publicly to García, give him a sum of US$5,000 in reparations, and launch human rights training courses within the institution.
- 23 December: The Provincial Court of Guayas ruled in favor of Raphaella, a girl born of a lesbian couple whom the Civil Registry refused to register as the daughter of two mothers, stating that the precedent established in the Satya case did not apply to Raphaella because she was conceived by non-medical artificial insemination. The Court rejected this argument and ordered the registration of the child, which finally occurred in February 2022.

=== 2022 ===
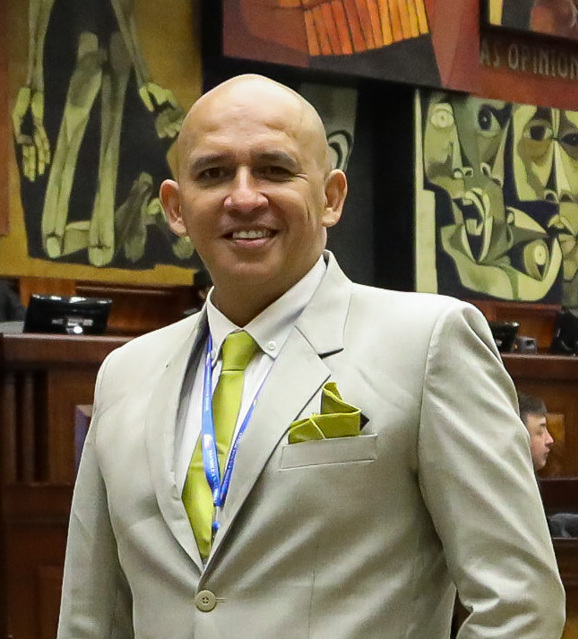
Walter Gómez Ronquillo in 2022.

- 12 September: Two openly LGBT politicians, Walter Gómez Ronquillo and Jahiren Noriega, took office as principal Assembly members after the resignation of Alexandra Arce and Pabel Muñoz.
- 14 October: The LGBT Chamber of Commerce of Ecuador held the first job fair for the LGBT+ community in the country.

=== 2023 ===
- 5 February: José Arroyo Cabrera is elected mayor of Pujilí Canton, making him the first openly LGBT person to be elected mayor in Ecuador's history.

=== 2024 ===
- 25 January: The National Assembly of Ecuador approved, in a final vote, a reform to the law on identity and vital records management, through which it legalized the change of sex or gender in identity documents for trans people without the need to present medical certificates or witnesses, as the law previously required. The bill was approved in the first vote on 12 December 2023.

== See also ==
- LGBT rights in Ecuador
- Decriminalization of homosexuality in Ecuador
- Same-sex marriage in Ecuador
- LGBT rights in the Americas
- Case No. 111-97-TC
- The Man Who Was Kicked to Death
- LGBTQIA+ in Guayaquil

== Bibliography ==
- Ugalde, María Fernanda (June 2017). Gutiérrez Usillos, Andrés (ed.). "2.4 De siamesas y matrimonios: tras la simbología del género y la identidad sexual en la iconografía de las culturas precolombinas de la costa ecuatoriana". Trans: Diversidad de identidades y roles de género (in Spanish). Madrid: Museo de América: 108–118. ISBN 978-84-8181-672-3. OCLC 1002691485.
- Aguiar, Juan Javier (August 2018). "Historia legal de la homosexualidad en el Ecuador". Novedades Jurídicas (in Spanish). XV (146): 50–61.
- Benavides, Hugo (2006). "La representación del pasado sexual de Guayaquil: historizando los enchaquirados". Íconos - Revista de Ciencias Sociales (in Spanish). 10 (24, Dossier: Lo global y lo local en el medio rural). Quito, Ecuador: Latin American Faculty of Social Sciences (FLACSO): 145–160. doi:10.17141/iconos.24.2006.154. hdl:10469/715. ISSN 1390-8065.
- Buendía, Silvia (2019). "Desde la vergüenza hacia el orgullo: El trayecto que nos permitió dejar de ser delincuentes y empezar a ser ciudadanos". In Viteri, María Amelia (ed.). Violencia, géneros y derechos en el territorio (in Spanish). Ecuador: Abya-Yala. pp. 113–138. ISBN 9789942096333.
- Ramos Ballesteros, Paulino (2019). Memorias Mecas. Archivo, imágenes y cuerpo en el vigésimo aniversario de la despenalización de la homosexualidad en Ecuador (MA in Visual Anthropology thesis) (in Spanish). Quito, Ecuador: Latin American Faculty of Social Sciences. hdl:10469/16003.
- Quintana, Yina; Pimentel, José Luis (2014). Balance y perspectivas de los derechos humanos de las personas LGBTI en el Ecuador (PDF) (in Spanish). Quito: Spanish Agency for International Development Cooperation (AECID). ISBN 978-9942-07-763-9. Archived from the original (PDF) on 3 November 2018.
- Mori Bolo, Giancarlo (2020). "El peso de Sodoma: el caso del doctor Manuel Barros de San Millán como arma política en el virreinato peruano a fines del siglo XVI". Histórica (in Spanish). 44 (1). Lima, Peru: Pontifical Catholic University of Peru: 7–40. doi:10.18800/historica.202001.001.
- Camacho Zambrano, Margarita (2011). La representación pública de la homosexualidad y el desprestigio político en el Ecuador: estudio de dos casos en medios escritos de comunicación masiva; 1963-4 y 2009 (Report) (in Spanish). Quito, Ecuador: Simón Bolívar Andean University (UASB). hdl:10644/3965.
- Cardona Montoya, Claudia Cristina (2015). Al otro lado del espejo: representación y homosexualidad en el festival de cine LGBT "El Lugar sin límites" de Ecuador (MA in Visual Anthropology thesis) (in Spanish). Quito, Ecuador: Latin American Faculty of Social Sciences. hdl:10469/8079.
- Cardona Acuña, Luz Ángela (2019). Sotavento y Barlovento: el impacto de las interacciones societales y soio-estatales sobre los cambios legales relativos a la diversidad sexual en Perú y Ecuador (1980-2018) (PhD in social sciences research thesis) (in Spanish). Mexico: Latin American Faculty of Social Sciences.
- Mancero, Cristina (2007). La construcción del movimiento gay y sus manifestaciones sociales, culturales, y políticas en la ciudad de Quito (Master's degree in social anthropology thesis) (in Spanish). Quito, Ecuador: Latin American Faculty of Social Sciences. hdl:10469/489.
- Garita, Ana Karen (2021). Hacerse voz: hacia una comprensión del sujeto, la subjetividad y la identidad política lésbica de Quito y Guayaquil a través del espacio biográfico (Master's degree in social sciences research thesis) (in Spanish). Quito, Ecuador: Latin American Faculty of Social Sciences. hdl:10469/17377.
- Del silencio a la visibilidad: activismos, politización y derechos humanos de las mujeres lesbianas en Ecuador (Report) (in Spanish). Quito, Ecuador: National Council for Gender Equality. 2020.
- Sancho Ordoñez, Fernando I.; Platero, R. Lucas (2018). "Memorias posibles para el Movimiento Trans* en Ecuador" (PDF). Ex Æquo (in Spanish). No. 38. Associação Portuguesa de Estudos sobre as Mulheres. doi:10.22355/exaequo.2018.38.04.
- Véjar, María Emilia (2013). TRANSgrediendo cuerpos Campaña comunicacional a favor del reconocimiento de la diversidad sexo-genética, específicamente de las mujeres trans (Bachelor's degree in communications and public relations thesis) (in Spanish). Quito, Ecuador: Universidad San Francisco de Quito.
