= Constitutional history of Ecuador =

Ecuador's first constitution as a republic was established in 1830, following the country's independence from Gran Colombia.

Ecuador has had a total of twenty constitutions over the course of its history, which can be seen as a symptom of Ecuador's chronic instability.

After several years of political crisis, the government of Rafael Correa, elected in 2006 following the dismissal of Lucio Gutiérrez by Congress, proposed a new Magna Carta for the country with the goal of stability and social development. This constitution, approved in 2008, is the latest episode of Ecuador's constitutional history.

== List of Constituent Assemblies of Ecuador ==
Year	Meeting place	Notes
1830	Riobamba	The Constituent Assembly for Ecuador's first constitution met on August 14 and was presided over by José Fernández Salvador. Its objective was the creation of the Republic of Ecuador, and Juan José Flores was named the provisional president.
1835	Ambato	The Constituent Assembly was presided over by José Joaquín de Olmedo and chose Vicente Rocafuerte as president.
1843	Quito	The Constituent Assembly was presided over by Francisco Marcos and chose Juan José Flores as president. This third constitution was called la Carta de la Esclavitud (the Charter of Slavery). It provided that Congress would meet only every four years. The term of the president and the Chamber of Deputies was eight years. Senators were elected for 12 years.
1845	Cuenca	The Constituent Assembly was presided over by Pablo Merino. This constitution legitimated the Marcist Revolution that overthrew Flores and installed a Provisional Triumvirate, led by Vicente Ramón Roca.
1850–51	Quito	The Constituent Assembly was presided over by Ramón de la Barrera. Diego Noboa was chosen as president.
1851	Guayaquil	The Constituent Assembly was presided over by Pedro Moncayo. General José María Urbina was chosen as president.
1861	Quito	The Constituent Assembly was presided over by General Juan José Flores. Gabriel García Moreno was chosen as president.
1869	Quito	The Constituent Assembly was presided over by Rafael Carvajal. This eighth constitution was called la Carta Negra (Black Charter). It was approved by referendum and permitted the second presidency of Gabriel García Moreno. It imposed the death penalty for political crimes and prohibited cults and religions except Catholicism. Catholicism was a requirement for citizenship.
1878	Ambato	The Constituent Assembly was presided over by General José María Urbina, following the overthrow of Antonio Borrero. General Ignacio de Veintemilla was chosen as president.
1883	Quito	The Constituent Assembly was presided over by Francisco J. Salazar, the tenth constitution was drawn, and named José María Plácido Caamaño as president, after the dictatorship of Ignacio de Ventimilla.
1896–97	Guayaquil	The first liberal constitution, following the June 5 Revolution. General Eloy Alfaro was chosen as president. The constitution established freedom of religion, removed the death penalty, and held that all citizens were equal under the law.
1906	Quito	The second liberal constitution. General Eloy Alfaro was chosen as president. This constitution was called "atheist" by the conservatives, because it separated church and state.
1928	Quito	New constitution and election for the presidency of Isidro Ayora. Included the achievements of the Revolución Juliana of 1925.
1937	Quito	Convened by dictator Federico Páez. It was dissolved when he was overthrown in the coup d'état led by General Alberto Enríquez Gallo.
1938	Quito	Convened by Alberto Enríquez Gallo. The Constituent Assembly chose Aurelio Narváez as president. The constitution never went into effect because it was abrogated by Narváez.
1944	Quito	A constitution was drawn up as a result of the Revolución de Mayo that overthrew president Carlos Arroyo del Río. José María Velasco Ibarra was named as president.
1946	Quito	Convened by José María Velasco Ibarra after a coup d'état.
1966	Quito	Convened by Clemente Yerovi. Otto Arosemena Gómez was chosen as president.
1978	Quito	Convened by the military government. The election of Jaime Roldós Aguilera was permitted. It was approved by referendum and allowed the Ecuadorian state to return to democratic government.
1997–98	Sangolquí	Constitutional Assembly was installed as but then called itself Constituent backed by referendum. He drafted a new constitution and government legalized Fabián Alarcón.
2007–08	Montecristi	Convened by Rafael Correa. It installed the Constituent Assembly backed by referendum in 2007 and is approved by referendum in 2008.

== See also ==
- Politics of Ecuador
- 2008 Constitution of Ecuador
