= Case 10‑18‑CN =

- Court: Constitutional Court
- Full case name: Case No. 10‑18‑CN (Same‑Sex Marriage)
- Decided: 12 June 2019
- Citation: 10‑18‑CN/19

Court membership
- Judges sitting: Alí Lozada(reporting justice) and all magistrates of the Constitutional Court

Case No. 10‑18‑CN (Same‑Sex Marriage) is a constitutional challenge filed before the Constitutional Court of Ecuador, seeking a ruling on the constitutionality of Article 81 of the Civil Code and Article 52 of the Organic Law on Identity Management and Civil Data. Ecuador's Civil Registry had invoked these two provisions to reject a same-sex marriage application.

The Court handed down its judgment on 12 June 2019, finding the contested articles unconstitutional. Justice Alí Lozada drafted the ruling, which the Court approved by a five‑to‑four margin, with four magistrates issuing dissenting votes. The judgment was released concurrently with case 11-18-CN, another proceeding addressing equal marriage rights. It took effect upon its publication in the Government gazette on 8 July that same year. Together, the two rulings legalised same-sex marriage in Ecuador.

The case originated from protective remedy No. 17230‑2018‑11800, brought by Rubén Salazar and Carlos Verdesoto. The Civil Registry had denied the two men's marriage petition in 2018. Following the judgment's entry into force, Salazar and Verdesoto married on 15 November 2019.

== Background ==
The legal battle to legalise same‑sex marriage in Ecuador began in 2013, at_activist Pamela Troya and her girlfriend attempted to register their marriage at the Civil Registry offices in Quito. After their application was rejected, the two women filed an action for protection against the agency. The case later reached the Constitutional Court but stalled indefinitely.

The litigation gained renewed momentum in 2018, when ten same‑sex couples filed separate actions for protection seeking marriage rights in Quito, Guayaquil and Cuenca as a form of strategic litigation. Eight of these claims were represented by the Pakta Foundation, and the remaining two by the Feminist Legal Collective. Among the ten protective remedies, the eighth was submitted on 8 August 2018 by the couple Carlos Daniel Verdesoto Rodríguez and Rubén Darío Salazar Gómez, and assigned case file number 17230‑2018‑11800. This specific protective proceeding would later give rise to Case 10‑18‑CN.

On 16 August 2018, the presiding judge of the Civil Judicial Unit of the Iñaquito parish in Quito — who was hearing Verdesoto and Salazar's protective claim — filed a constitutional review petition with the Constitutional Court challenging Article 81 of the Civil Code and Article 52 of the Organic Law on Identity Management and Civil Data. The Civil Registry had cited these two provisions to justify denying the couple's marriage application. The constitutional review petition was formally transmitted to the Constitutional Court on 22 August that same year.

== Grounds for the Referral ==
The referral was submitted to the Constitutional Court after the trial judge hearing the protective remedy brought by Carlos Verdesoto and Rubén Salazar determined that the statutory provisions relied on by the Civil Registry to reject their marriage application likely violated the petitioners' rights to equality and non‑discrimination. These rights are enshrined under Article 424 of the Constitution of Ecuador and the American Convention on Human Rights. The first contested provision was Article 81 of the Civil Code, which read as follows:

Art. 81: Marriage is a solemn contract through which a man and a woman unite for the purpose of cohabitation, procreation, and mutual support.

The second statute challenged in the referral was Article 52 of the Organic Law on Identity Management and Civil Data, whose text stated:

Art. 52: Authority before which marriage is solemnised and registered. Marriage is the union between a man and a woman, and it shall be solemnised and registered before the General Directorate of the Civil Registry, Identification and Civil Documentation. Outside Ecuadorian territory, marriage shall be solemnised and registered before a diplomatic or consular agent, provided at least one of the contracting parties holds Ecuadorian nationality.

== Constitutional process ==
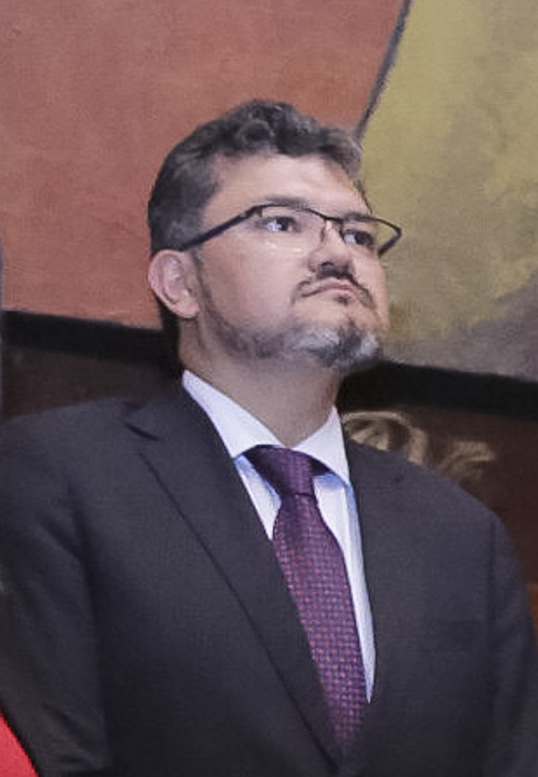
Alí Lozada, the judge who reported on the case.

On 27 March 2019, the Constitutional Court accepted the Civil Judicial Unit judge's constitutional norm review petition for formal processing, triggering a 45‑day deadline to resolve the matter.

On 7 May that same year, Justice Alí Lozada — randomly assigned as the case's reporting justice — scheduled a public hearing to take place on 20 May. During that hearing, Verdesoto told the Court that the couple would not settle for common‑law partnerships, as such unions "do not carry the same rights afforded to married couples." He added that he and Salazar sought official state recognition of their family unit.

The case drew 25 amicus curiae submissions. Twenty‑three were delivered orally at the 20 May public hearing, one was submitted both orally and in writing, and the final filing was provided solely in written form. Individuals and organisations contributing these briefs included activists Pamela Troya and Christian Paula, Ecuador's Ombudsman Office, the group Colombia Diversa, and the Universidad Internacional SEK and UIDE

=== Case Judgment ===
The Constitutional Court held a closed-door deliberation on 12 June 2019 to rule on both Case No. 10‑18‑CN and case 11-18-CN. The draft judgment authored by Justice Alí Lozada was ultimately approved by a five‑to‑four majority, striking down the challenged statutory provisions as unconstitutional and thereby legalising same‑sex marriage nationwide. Joining Lozada in the majority were Constitutional Magistrates Agustín Grijalva, Daniela Salazar, Karla Andrade and Ramiro Ávila Santamaría. Magistrates Hernán Salgado, Carmen Corral, Enrique Herrería and Teresa Nuques filed dissenting opinions.

In the official ruling, formally titled Judgment No. 10‑18‑CN/19, Justice Lozada structured his analysis around three core questions to resolve the constitutional referral: whether the Constitution banned same‑sex marriage outright, left its regulation solely to legislative discretion, or mandated its legal recognition. Addressing the first question, Lozada examined Article 67 of the Constitution, which governs heterosexual marriage, and concluded the text contained no explicit ban on same‑spouse marriage, nor any constitutional principle supporting such a restrictive reading. He reasoned that the Constitution instead enshrines protections for all families, the free development of personality, privacy, and freedom of conscience — principles incompatible with a prohibition on equal marriage.

Turning to the argument that the legislature held discretionary authority over legalising same‑sex marriage, Lozada acknowledged the principle of legislative deference but held that constitutional provisions mandating equal marriage rights took precedence. He further noted that international jurisprudence, specifically Advisory Opinion OC‑24/17, also affirmed the human right to equal marriage; failure to recognise this right would expose Ecuador to adverse international repercussions.

Based on these lines of reasoning, Lozada's judgment issued a substitutive finding of unconstitutionality with erga omnes effect for Article 81 of the Civil Code and Article 52 of the Organic Law on Identity Management and Civil Data. The ruling specifically struck the phrases "a man and a woman" and "procreation" from both statutes. It also ordered the National Assembly to amend all marriage‑related legislation to include same‑sex spouses. The Court's judgment accordingly replaced Article 81 of the Civil Code with the following text:

Art. 81: Marriage is a solemn contract through which two persons unite for the purpose of cohabitation and mutual support.

As for Article 52 of the Organic Law on Identity Management and Civil Data, the revised text reads as follows:

Art. 52: Authority before which marriage is solemnised and registered. Marriage is the union between two persons, and it shall be solemnised and registered before the General Directorate of the Civil Registry, Identification and Civil Documentation. Outside Ecuadorian territory, marriage shall be solemnised and registered before a diplomatic or consular agent, provided at least one of the contracting parties holds Ecuadorian nationality.

=== Saved votes ===
The ruling in Case 10‑18‑CN included a dissenting opinion written by Constitutional Magistrate Hernán Salgado, was joined by three other magistrates. In his reasoning, Salgado argued that Article 67 of the Constitution the provision governing heterosexual marriage — contained unambiguous language that did not allow for alternative judicial interpretations. He contended that the majority's reasoning set a precedent permitting the Court to reinterpret any clear, specific constitutional provision.

In Salgado's view, Article 67 explicitly defined marriage as a union between one man and one woman as a mandatory prerequisite. On that basis, he maintained that the statutory provisions challenged in the case were not unconstitutional and remained consistent with the constitutional text.

Salgado further argued the judgment created an internal conflict in practical enforcement. The ruling simultaneously authorised same‑sex couples to enter marriage and directed the National Assembly to pass supplementary marriage law reforms. He noted this directive stood in tension with the judgment in case 11-18-CN, which held that no legislative amendments were required to immediately solemnise same‑sex marriages.

== Reactions ==
The Constitutional Court's rulings in Cases 10‑18‑CN and case 11-18-CN sparked street celebrations by LGBT rights organisations across multiple Ecuadorian cities. Religious and conservative groups, however, voiced opposition to the decisions. The Archdiocese of Quito released a statement on 14 June 2019 criticising the judgments, shortly after Constitutional Court President Hernán Salgado announced at a press conference that marriage rights had been extended to same‑sex couples. In the weeks afterward, anti‑ruling protest marches were held in Guayaquil and Quito. Conversely, rallies supporting the verdicts took place in several cities to mark International LGBT Pride Day.

On 21 June, President Lenín Moreno addressed the matter in a televised speech, stating that both he and all citizens bore a duty to respect the Constitutional Court's rulings. He described the Court's magistrates as "serious and honest judges." United Nations High Commissioner for Human Rights for Human Rights also issued a statement commending the Court's justices for "responsibly taking on the challenge of building bridges between diverse perspectives without leaving anyone behind."

The judgment entered into force upon its publication in the Official Registry of Ecuador on 8 July of the same year, formally legalising same‑sex marriage throughout Ecuador. The nation's first same‑sex wedding occurred on 18 July 2019, when a lesbian couple registered their marriage at the Civil Registry offices in Guayaquil.

== See also ==
- LGBTQ rights in Ecuador
