= Satya case =

2018 court case in Ecuador regarding same-sex parenting

- Court: Constitutional Court of Ecuador
- Full case name: 1692-12-EP
- Started: June 8, 2017
- Decided: May 29, 2018

Case 1692-12-EP, also known as the Satya case, is an Ecuadorian court case of alleged gender discrimination involving the name of a little girl. Her two mothers were prevented from registering her in the Civil Registry of Ecuador using both their surnames. The legal case is presented as a case of gender discrimination due to her status as a child of a same-sex parent household.

The problem arose when the Civil Registry refused to register the child with the surnames of her two mothers: Helen Bicknell and Nicola Rothon, a British couple living in Ecuador who, at the time, had been together for 14 years. In August 2012, the couple filed a writ of amparo against the Civil Registry of Ecuador.

On 29 May 2018, the Constitutional Court ruled in favor of Satya's mothers and gave the Civil Registry a period of 30 days to register the girl with her mothers' surnames. In addition, the Court ordered that, in the future, any child conceived through assisted reproductive technology will have to be registered regardless of whether they come from a heterosexual or same-sex parent household.

== Background ==
Satya Bicknell Rothon was born on 8 December 2011, the daughter of British citizens Nicola Rothon and Helen Bicknell, conceived via artificial insemination. At the time of Satya's birth, Rothon and Bicknell had been in a relationship for 14 years. Moreover, they had legally registered as a couple in the United Kingdom in 2010. In Ecuador, their relationship had been recognized as a de facto union.

On 10 January 2012, the couple attempted to register Satya in the Civil Registry, but the institution refused, arguing that it was doing so en pro de precautelar la seguridad jurídica de la filiación paterna (Note: English: In order to safeguard the legal security of paternal filiation) because Ecuadorian legislation did not consider the duplicidad de filiación materna en una inscripción de nacimiento. (Note: English: Duplication of maternal filiation in a birth registration) Bicknell and Rothon, with the support of the Ombudsman's Office of Ecuador, filed a writ of amparo against the Civil Registry. The public hearing on the case took place on 4 May 2012 at the Fourth Court of Criminal Guarantees, but the judge dismissed the motion, stating that the complainants should exhaust the appeal measures of the Civil Registry before resorting to justice.

== Development ==
The Ombudsman's Office of Ecuador was present at the last hearing of the case that took place in the Constitutional Court. Prior to the judge issuing a decision, the arguments of the case were explained based on the principle of the best interest of the child and the violation of her rights.

The hearing at the Constitutional Court to hear the points of view of several witnesses in favor and against Satya's registration with the surnames of her two mothers lasted for more than three hours. Meanwhile, several human rights activist groups gathered outside the court, carrying signs to ask for a ruling in favor of the little girl and to comply with the Constitution regarding respect for diverse families.

Christian Paula, an attorney and university professor who was present at the hearing, said:

Ha sido un viacrucis demostrar cómo se ha vulnerado los derechos de esta niña y cómo tener el apellido de sus 2 madres la violenta en su identidad, ya que no tiene el mismo ejercicio de derechos que un pequeño que lleva los apellidos de su padre y madre. (Note: English: It has been an ordeal to prove how the rights of this little girl have been violated and how having the last name of her two mothers violates her identity, since she does not have the same exercise of rights as a child who bears the surnames of her father and mother.)

Moreover, José Luis Guerra, the director of the Ombudsman's Office and a member of the defense team, argued:

Queremos que se respete la identidad de Satya como hija de una pareja de mujeres y eso no afecta los derechos de otras familias del país ya que vivimos en un estado laico. (Note: English: We want Satya's identity to be respected as the child of a female couple. This does not affect the rights of other families in the country since we live in a secular state.)

The hearing ended without a final ruling from the Constitutional Court. At the time, the people involved hoped that the court would rule in favor of the British couple, as the case represented a significant milestone in equal rights for LGBTQIA+ persons.

On Tuesday 29 June 2018, the Constitutional Court admitted the extraordinary motion.

The ruling in Satya's case sets a precedent in the fight for the rights of same-sex parent families in Ecuador, since one of the reparation measures included in the ruling is making it mandatory for the Civil Registry to register the children of same-sex couples by writing the surnames of their two mothers or fathers. This only applies when the couple has chosen to have children via assisted reproduction methods, since Article 68 of the Constitution of Ecuador still maintains the prohibition of adoption for same-sex couples. (Note: English: Adoption shall apply only to opposite-sex couples.)

== See also ==
- Timeline of LGBT history in Ecuador

== Bibliography ==
- Figuera Vargas, Sorily Carolina; Robles Arias, Johana (January–June 2019). "La nacionalidad como un derecho humano: El caso Satya de Ecuador". Justicia (in Spanish). 24 (35). Venezuela: Simón Bolívar University: 41–53. doi:10.17081/just.24.35.3387. ISSN 2590-4566.
