= Genetically modified food in South America =

Brazil and Argentina are the 2nd and 3rd largest producers of genetically modified food behind the United States.

The Argentine government was one of the first to accept genetically modified food. Assessment of genetically modified products for release is provided by the National Agricultural Biotechnology Advisory Committee (environmental impact), the National Service of Health and Agrifood Quality (food safety) and the National Agribusiness Direction (effect on trade), with the final decision made by the Secretariat of Agriculture, Livestock, Fishery and Food. The government is looking to tighten the current law which allows farmers to keep seed without paying royalties in a bid to encourage more private investment.

In Brazil the National Biosafety Technical Commission is responsible for assessing environmental and food safety and prepares guidelines for transport, importation and field experiments involving GM products. The Council of Ministers evaluates the commercial and economical issues with release. The National Biosafety Technical Commission has 27 members and includes 12 scientists, 9 ministerial representatives and 6 other specialists.

Honduras, Costa Rica, Colombia, Bolivia, Paraguay, Chile, and Uruguay also allow GM crops to be grown.

Venezuela banned genetically modified seeds in 2004, in 2008, Ecuador prohibited genetically engineered crops and seeds in its 2008 Constitution, approved by 64% of the population in a referendum (although Ecuadorian President Rafael Correa said in 2012 that this was "a mistake"). Peru has banned transgenic crops.
