= Constitution of 1830 =

Constitution of 1830 may refer to:

- Charter of 1830 in France
- Constitution of Ecuador of 1830
- Constitution of Uruguay of 1830
- Constitution of Venezuela of 1830
