= 1997 Ecuadorian Constitutional Assembly election =

Constitutional Assembly elections were held in Ecuador on 30 November 1997. They followed a referendum earlier in the year, in which 65% of voters voted in favour of electing an Assembly. The referendum was held after a military coup on 5 February.

The Social Christian Party emerged as the largest faction in the Assembly, winning 20 of the 70 seats.

== Results ==
| Party | Votes | % | Seats |
|---|---|---|---|
| Social Christian Party | 768,514 | 24.82 | 20 |
| Ecuadorian Roldosist Party | 441,165 | 14.25 | 7 |
| Popular Democracy | 291,835 | 9.42 | 10 |
| New Country | 196,572 | 6.35 | 2 |
| New People | 190,083 | 6.14 | 1 |
| Democratic People's Movement | 154,739 | 5.00 | 3 |
| Freedom Party–Alfarista Radical Front | 141,646 | 4.57 | 5 |
| Democratic Left | 134,853 | 4.36 | 3 |
| Pachakutik Movement | 128,461 | 4.15 | 7 |
| Popular Democracy–Democratic Left | 34,754 | 1.12 | 3 |
| ID–PSE–MP | 15,690 | 0.51 | 2 |
| CFP–PSC | 8,904 | 0.29 | 1 |
| ALAP–NP | 6,312 | 0.20 | 1 |
| Independent Social Movements | 4,363 | 0.14 | 1 |
| PL–FRA–DP | 1,829 | 0.06 | 1 |
| ID–PSE–MP–NP | 1,248 | 0.04 | 1 |
| FRA–PSE | 1,067 | 0.03 | 1 |
| Independent Movement "Pastaza, Change with Dignity" | 557 | 0.02 | 1 |
| Others | 573,917 | 18.53 | 0 |
| Total | 3,096,509 | 100.00 | 70 |
| Valid votes | 3,096,509 | 74.29 | |
| Invalid/blank votes | 1,071,590 | 25.71 | |
| Total votes | 4,168,099 | 100.00 | |
| Registered voters/turnout | 6,974,623 | 59.76 | |
Source: Nohlen, LADB
