= Same-sex civil unions in Ecuador =

Countries with civil unions in South America. Civil unions for same-sex and opposite-sex couples. Civil unions only for opposite-sex couples. No civil unions.

Same-sex civil unions in Ecuador, legally recognized as "de facto unions" (Spanish: Unión de hecho), have been permitted since the adoption of the 2008 Constitution. On 15 September 2014, following agreements between LGBTQ organizations and the executive branch, the government formally implemented their registration.

The decision was announced by the President of Ecuador during his 387th weekly address, following a meeting with LGBTQ groups on 18 August 2014. The recognition of same-sex de facto unions as a civil status—granting rights comparable to marriage—was met with protests from conservative and religious groups.

== History ==
One of the earliest precedents for the recognition of same-sex couples in Ecuador occurred in 2004. Drawing on the historical development of common-law unions in the country—which had initially resembled private contracts before gaining legal recognition—activist Elizabeth Vásquez developed a strategy she described as "alternative litigation" to secure legal recognition for LGBTQ couples. She drafted a contract outlining the terms of a "gay union" between two men, Bermeo and Carrillo. Taking advantage of the fact that commercial contracts in Ecuador faced few restrictions as long as they did not violate existing laws, the document established provisions such as a joint property arrangement, the exchange of engagement rings, the presence of witnesses, and even referred to the parties as "bride and groom".

The notary who received the request initially refused, arguing that the couple was attempting to register a common-law marriage. Vásquez responded that the document was merely a commercial contract and that the notary's role was limited to certifying the agreement between the parties. The contract was ultimately notarized.

== See also ==
- LGBTQ rights in Ecuador
- Same-sex marriage in Ecuador
