= Pamela Troya =

Ecuadorian LGBT rights activist and communications manager (born 1982)

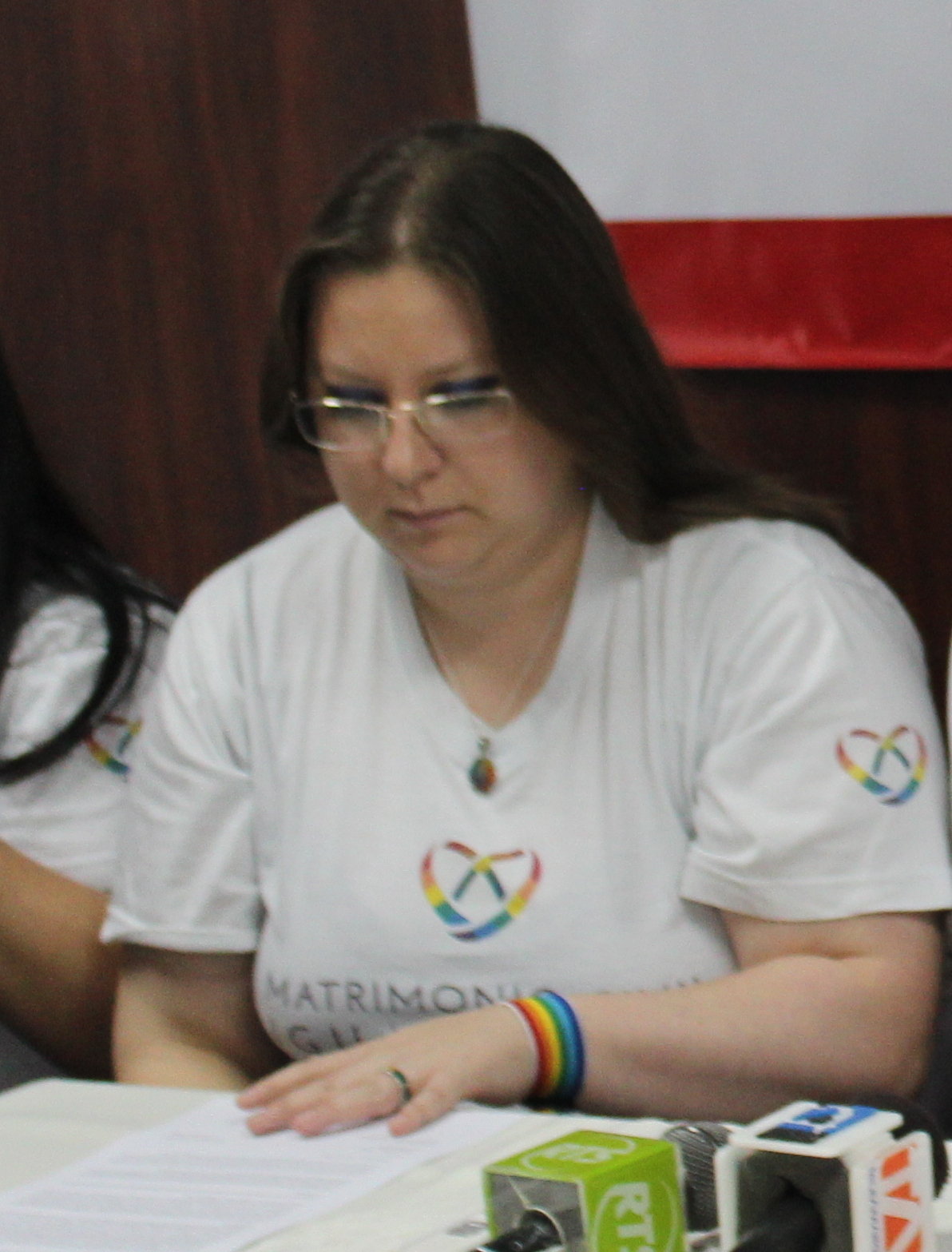
- Pamela Troya in 2013
- Born: Pamela Karina Troya Báez; 1982 (age 43–44); Quito, Pichincha, Ecuador
- Education: Universidad San Francisco de Quito
- Occupations: LGBT rights activist; communications manager
- Years active: 2007–present
- Known for: Establishing the campaign to legalise same-sex marriage in Ecuador
- Spouse: Gabriela Correa (m. 2019; div. 2019)

Pamela Karina Troya Báez (born 1982) is an Ecuadorian LGBT rights activist and communications manager, known for starting the campaign to legalise same-sex marriage in Ecuador. In the political sphere, she ran as a candidate to the Ecuadorian National Assembly and to the Council of Citizen Participation and Social Control.

== Early life and education ==
Pamela Karina Troya Báez was born in 1982 in Quito, Ecuador.

Troya was educated at the Universidad San Francisco de Quito, graduating in 2005 with a bachelor's degree in organisational communication.

== Career ==
In 2007, Troya began her public career as an advisor to Quito Counselor Margarita Carranco during the approval process of Ordinance 240. Passed in December 2007, Ordinance 240 guaranteed protections based on sexual orientation and gender identity and was the first ordinance of its kind in the country.

In 2012, Troya joined the Council for Citizen Participation and Social Control.

=== Legal battle for equal marriage ===
Before her activism in favor of same-sex marriage, Troya was part of the LGBT activism group "¡Igualdad de Derechos, Ya!" (English translation: "Equal rights, now!").

In 2013, Troya started the group Matrimonio Civil Igualitario Ecuador. On August 5 of that year, she and her partner went to the Quito Civil Registry offices to ask to get married, which began the campaign to legalize same-sex marriage in Ecuador. This petition was rejected by the entity days later, citing the prohibition of equal marriage in the Constitution of Ecuador and in the Civil Code as the reason for the refusal. In response, Troya and her girlfriend filed a protection action on August 13.

In September of the same year, civil judge Gloria Pillajo issued a ruling in which she rejected the protection action. Troya and her girlfriend appealed that decision, but the Provincial Court of Pichincha also denied the request. On June 24, 2014, both filed a last instance appeal before the Constitutional Court, where the lawsuit remained unanswered for years.

After the legalization of same-sex marriage in the country in June 2019, thanks to the constitutional rulings in the cases 11-18-CN and 10-18-CN. Troya was finally able to marry her girlfriend, an event that took place on August 5 of the same year, six years after they applied to marry for the first time. However, both divorced on September 27, 2019, 53 days after the wedding.

=== Later trajectory ===
For the 2021 legislative elections, Troya was one of the few openly LGBT candidates for the National Assembly. She ran on the election on behalf of the Popular Unity party to be a provincial assembly member for Pichincha. Although Popular Unity supported the presidential candidacy of environmental politician Yaku Pérez in those elections, Troya positioned herself in favor of the social democrat Xavier Hervas.

In February 2022, she joined work as a national deputy coordinator of Transparency in the Council for Citizen Participation and Social Control (CPCCS), where she continued to work until September of the same year. Previously, she had already worked in the entity as an advisor. During the following year's selections, Troya was a candidate on the women's list for the CPCCS, but obtained sixth place and was not elected.

In June 2024, Troya and the politician Santiago Becdach filed a complaint with the Electoral Contentious Court against four members of the CPCCS (two principals and two alternates) alleging that their candidacies were promoted by the Citizen Revolution Movement. On September 3rd of the same year, the court ruled in favor of the plaintiffs and dismissed the appointed councilors.

== See also ==
- Same-sex marriage in Ecuador
