= Kidnapping of Zulema Constante =

2020 hate crime in Ecuador

- Date: May 2013
- Location: Tena, Napo Province, Ecuador
- Type: Kidnapping

In May 2013, Zulema Constante was kidnapped by her father and four others and interned against her will in an addiction center called La Esperanza in the Tena, Ecuador. She was held at the facility with the intention of "dehomosexualizing" her after Zulema informed her family that she was involved in a romantic relationship with another woman. The case was widely reported in the media.

== Background ==
In early 2013, Zulema Constante revealed to her parents that she was in a romantic relationship with another woman, Titi. Her homosexuality was rejected by her family, who threatened her and her partner. As per a recording done on a cell phone, Constante's mother is seen yelling, "You know that sick people need to be restrained to heal. If I send you, no one will find you even under the stones".

== Incident ==
In mid May 2013, Zulema's father told her to take a break from her work at the Ministry of Agriculture in Guayaquil and to have lunch with him to allegedly make peace with her. When Constante came to meet her father, she found four people waiting along with her dad with two cars. They forcibly took her, put her in one of the vehicles and handcuffed her. Zulema's parents interned her against her will in a deaddiction center called La Esperanza located in Tena, Napo province, as a form of conversion therapy.

Titi, who had last heard from Zulema on 17 May 2013, reported her disappearance to the authorities. However, the police did not take her complaint, and discredited her. As the disappearance of Zulema spread on the social networks, the family felt pressurized and took her back from the center. Constante later told her lawyer, "They were scared in the clinic as my parents called them. They put me in the first taxi, paid my father money and ordered him to take me back to the house".

== Aftermath ==
Lawyer Silvia Buendía took up the case. Zulema's first reaction to the media was that she denounced the narration of her parents, and described the incident as a hate crime, as her parents had put her in the center with the intention of "dehomosexualizing" her.

When Buendía took the case to the public prosecutor, as per Buendía, the prosecutor's office refused to take up the case and threw the papers in her face while replying "this is no crime, ma'am. Surely the parents have decided that, in fact, this girl must be denied because she has behaved badly". The prosecutor's office only accepted the case after it was taken to the Ombudsman's Office in Guayaquil.

The case was widely reported in the media. The existence of such clinics was condemned and the incident was denounced by public figures such as the Puerto Rican singer Ricky Martin.

== Investigation and trial ==
The prosecutor's office conducted an investigation into the case. As per the prosecutor Mario Cadena, the vehicle, which was used for kidnapping Zuelma, was stopped by the Traffic Police before leaving Guayaquil. While Zulema screamed and kicked, her father called someone to influence the police, and the police released them. She described that Zulema's parents decided to intern her against her as a form of conversion therapy, while the contract, signed by Constante's parents, did not mention of the word "dehomosexualization" because it was officially constituted as de-addiction center.

On 16 July 2013, the officials from the center, who assaulted Zulema, were held in pretrial detention. Further investigation revealed that the clinic was operated by the National Inter-Agency Commission, under the direct supervision of an official of the Ministry of Health, which owned the clinic. On 18 July, the trial began, and initial orders were passed by the judge. On 24 February 2014, three of the accused were found responsible for the hate crime, and were sentenced to ten days in prison, a penalty to be served at the Archidona Social Rehabilitation Center apart from and a fine of six US dollars.
