= Humberto Mata Espinel =

Ecuadorian politician and activist

- Born: 1968 (age 57–58); Guayaquil, Ecuador
- Education: Harvard University
- Occupations: LGBTQ activist; politician

Humberto Mata Espinel (born 1967 or 1968, Guayaquil) is an Ecuadorian activist and former politician. He currently serves as the manager of the VIHDA Foundation, an organization that aims to reducing HIV transmission from mothers to their children.

In 2011, he became the first Ecuadorian public figure to marry a person of the same sex. The marriage took place in Argentina, and his spouse is activist Maximiliano Novoa.

== Biography ==
Mata began his secondary education at the Cristóbal Colón Salesian School in Guayaquil before continuing his studies in the United States. He earned a degree in Political Science from Harvard University and later obtained a Master of Business Administration from the University of Pennsylvania.

=== Political career ===
Mata entered politics in 1994 as part of a youth group affiliated with the Concentration of People's Forces party, led by former deputy Rodolfo Baquerizo Nazur.

In 1997, he founded the Fuerza Ecuador Movement. He ran for prefect of Guayas Province in the 2000 sectional elections, but lost to conservative candidate Nicolás Lapentti Carrión. One of his main campaign proposals was to increase the province’s autonomy. In the 2002 presidential election, Mata and his movement supported the candidacy of socialist León Roldós Aguilera.

In the 2004 sectional elections, Mata again ran for prefect of Guayas, finishing second to Lapentti. He also ran unsuccessfully for the 2007 Constituent Assembly, where he opposed the policies of President Rafael Correa.

Following these campaigns, Mata withdrew from political life.

=== Personal life ===
Before publicly coming out as gay, Mata was in a relationship with dancer and television presenter Carla Sala.

In April 2011, he announced his marriage to activist Maximiliano Novoa in Argentina, becoming the first Ecuadorian public figure to enter into a same-sex marriage. Actress and news anchor Érika Vélez later stated that the couple had been in a relationship for five years at the time of the wedding.

After coming out, Mata said he had concealed his sexual orientation during his political career to prevent it from being used against him or his family.
