= Same-sex marriage in Ecuador =

Same-sex marriage has been legal in Ecuador since 8 July 2019, following a ruling from the Constitutional Court of Ecuador that the ban on same-sex marriages was unconstitutional under the Constitution of Ecuador. The court held on 12 June 2019 that the Constitution required the government to license and recognise same-sex marriages. It focused its ruling on an advisory opinion issued by the Inter-American Court of Human Rights in January 2018 that signatories to the American Convention on Human Rights should grant same-sex couples "accession to all existing domestic legal systems of family registration, including marriage, along with all rights that derive from marriage". The ruling took effect upon publication in the government gazette on 8 July. Ecuador was the fifth country in South America, after Argentina, Brazil, Uruguay and Colombia, and the 26th in the world to allow same-sex couples to marry nationwide.

Ecuador has also recognized same-sex civil unions since 2008, following inclusion in the new constitution and approval in a general referendum. Adoption by married couples remains restricted to opposite-sex couples.

== Civil unions ==
=== Passage and referendum ===
Since the early 20th century, opposite-sex civil unions, available after two years of cohabitation, have been granted the same rights as civil marriages. In the late 19th century, the liberal revolution led by Eloy Alfaro established the separation of church and state in Ecuador. Since the consolidation of this separation in the first decades of the 20th century, only civil marriage or unions have been recognized by the state.

During debate over the 2008 Ecuadorian Constitution, LGBT organizations campaigned for the inclusion of same-sex civil unions, which were eventually included in Article 68 of the Constitution, despite protests from the Catholic Church and evangelical groups. Under the text of the new Constitution, the only difference between same-sex and opposite-sex unions is that adoption by same-sex couples is not permitted; adoption rights are identical for civil unions and civil marriages, but do not extend to same-sex unions. Protection against discrimination based on sexual orientation had already been introduced in the 1998 Constitution, Ecuador being among the first three countries in the world to adopt such a constitutional protection, alongside South Africa and Fiji. President Rafael Correa said he wanted the document to allow same-sex unions, saying that "the profoundly humanistic position of this government is to respect the intrinsic dignity of everyone, of every human being, independently of their creed, race, sexual preference. We will give certain guarantees to stable gay couples but matrimony will continue being reserved for a man, a woman and the family. Every person has dignity, that's to say, one must respect a person independently of their sexual preference. Be careful not to deny employment to someone because of their sexual preference. That is discrimination, that is unconstitutional."

The Constitution was approved in a referendum by 69% of voters, and was officially recorded on 20 October 2008. The first same-sex union was recognised in August 2009. Article 68 of the Constitution states:

The stable and monogamous union between two persons, free of matrimonial bond, who form a de facto couple, for the duration and under the conditions and circumstances that the law provides, will generate the same rights and obligations as held by families built through marriage. Adoption will pertain only to couples of different sexes. (Note: In some languages of Ecuador: Spanish: La unión estable y monogámica entre dos personas libres de vínculo matrimonial que formen un hogar de hecho, por el lapso y bajo las condiciones y circunstancias que señale la ley, generará los mismos derechos y obligaciones que tienen las familias constituidas mediante matrimonio. La adopción corresponderá sólo a parejas de distinto sexo.; Quechua: Kawsankapa tinkunakuyka, shuk kari, shuk warmi mana sawarishka tantarishkallami tukun, shinapash shuk ayllumi wallparin; kayka shuk pachata, arinishkakuna ukupi, kamachiy shuk kutinlla nishkami kan. Shinapash sawarishpa ayllu wallparishkakunapak hayñikunata, mañayta charishkatami hapin. Shukpak wawata wakchushpa wiñachinaka shuk kari, shuk warmi sawarishka, tantarishkapakllami kanka.; Shuar: Tsaniniamuka chikichkijiainkiti, ankant natsa ania, tuke nuatnaikia atiniaiti umitiai umpuarma tana aintsank, máshi nuatnaikiar matsatainia aintsank pujusartiniaiti. Uchirimmiaka nuájai aishmank uchinkia tsakátmartin Ainiawai.)

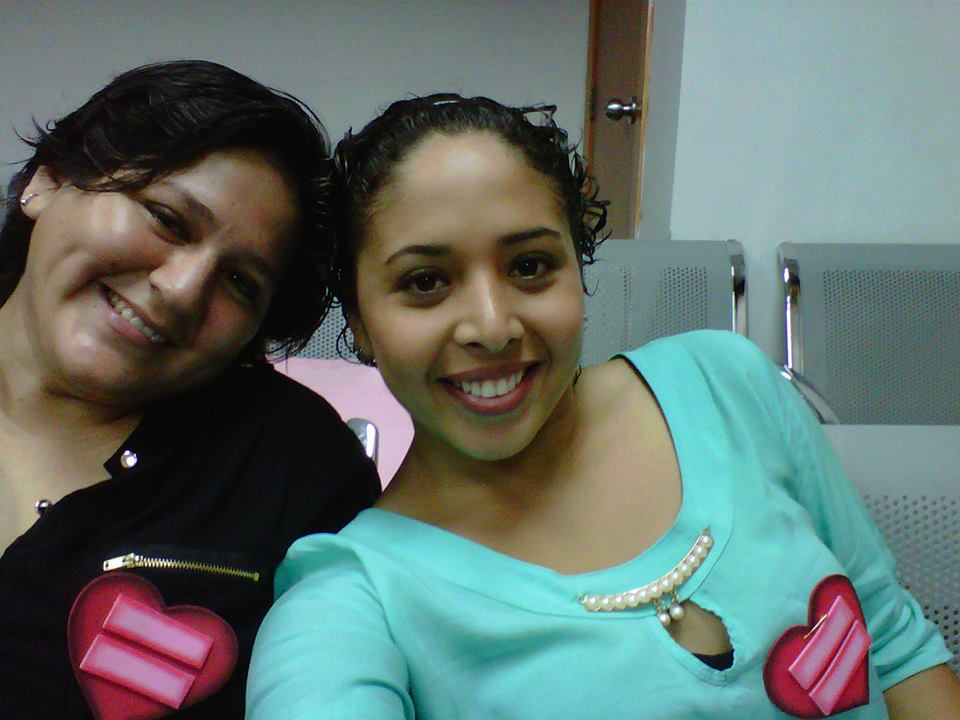
Karla Vacacela and Priscila Rivera, the first Ecuadorian lesbian couple to register a civil union

Although civil unions were legalised in the 2008 Constitution, they were not formally recognized in the government's vital records until 15 September 2014, when the General Directorate of Civil Registry Identification and Certification (Dirección General de Registro Civil, Identificación y Cedulación) began registering them nationwide. Three cities, Quito, Guayaquil and Cuenca, had already begun registering civil unions prior to this. On 21 April 2015, the National Assembly approved a bill codifying same-sex civil unions into statutory law by a vote of 89–1. The bill also removed the requirement to have lived together for two years. President Correa signed it into law on 19 June 2015. The law changed article 222 of the Civil Code to read: The stable and monogamous union between two persons, free of matrimonial bond, of legal age, who form a de facto couple, generates the same rights and obligations as held by families built through marriage and leads to a community property. (Note: Spanish: La unión estable y monogámica entre dos personas libres de vínculo matrimonial, mayores de edad, que formen un hogar de hecho, genera los mismos derechos y obligaciones que tienen las familias constituidas mediante matrimonio y da origen a una sociedad de bienes.)

=== Statistics ===
By January 2018, 15,992 civil unions had been registered in Ecuador, of which 3% were to same-sex couples.

== Same-sex marriage ==
Recognition of same-sex unions in South America Marriage Other type of partnership Unrecognized Constitution limits marriage to opposite-sex couples Same-sex sexual activity illegal, though penalties not enforced

=== Background and summary ===
Under Article 67 of the 2008 Constitution, "marriage is the union between man and woman based on the free consent of the parties and their equal rights, obligations and legal capacity." However, the Constitutional Court ruled that this article was unenforceable and void on 12 June 2019, legalizing same-sex marriage in Ecuador. The court focused its ruling on an advisory opinion issued by the Inter-American Court of Human Rights (IACHR) in January 2018 that signatories to the American Convention on Human Rights should grant same-sex couples "accession to all existing domestic legal systems of family registration, including marriage, along with all rights that derive from marriage".

During a series of interviews with local newspaper El Universo before the 2013 general election, two of the eight presidential candidates expressed their support for same-sex marriage: leftist candidates Alberto Acosta Espinoza from the Plurinational Unity of the Lefts, and Norman Wray from the Ruptura 25 party. President Rafael Correa did not participate in the interviews. However, in a 2011 interview for Radio France Internationale, Correa said that he "couldn't accept" same-sex marriage or abortion, although when asked if he would oppose legislation legalizing either of them, he referred only to abortion when saying that he would certainly oppose it. On 17 February 2013, Correa was re-elected by a wide margin. He reiterated his opposition to same-sex marriage on 23 May 2013. Ahead of the 2017 presidential election, Paco Moncayo, candidate for the Democratic Left, called for a national debate on the legalisation of same-sex marriage. The election was won by Lenín Moreno, candidate for the PAIS Alliance, whose position on same-sex marriage was unknown, as he had refused to answer questions on the issue from activist Pamela Troya.

On 4 March 2016, the Azuay Provincial Chamber, with support from the provincial government, unanimously approved an ordinance allowing symbolic same-sex marriages in Azuay. The ordinance allowed same-sex couples to register their marriages with the provincial civil registry, but the marriages were only symbolic with no legal effect. The first symbolic marriage was held in late June 2016 in Cuenca.

=== Early campaigning and first lawsuits ===
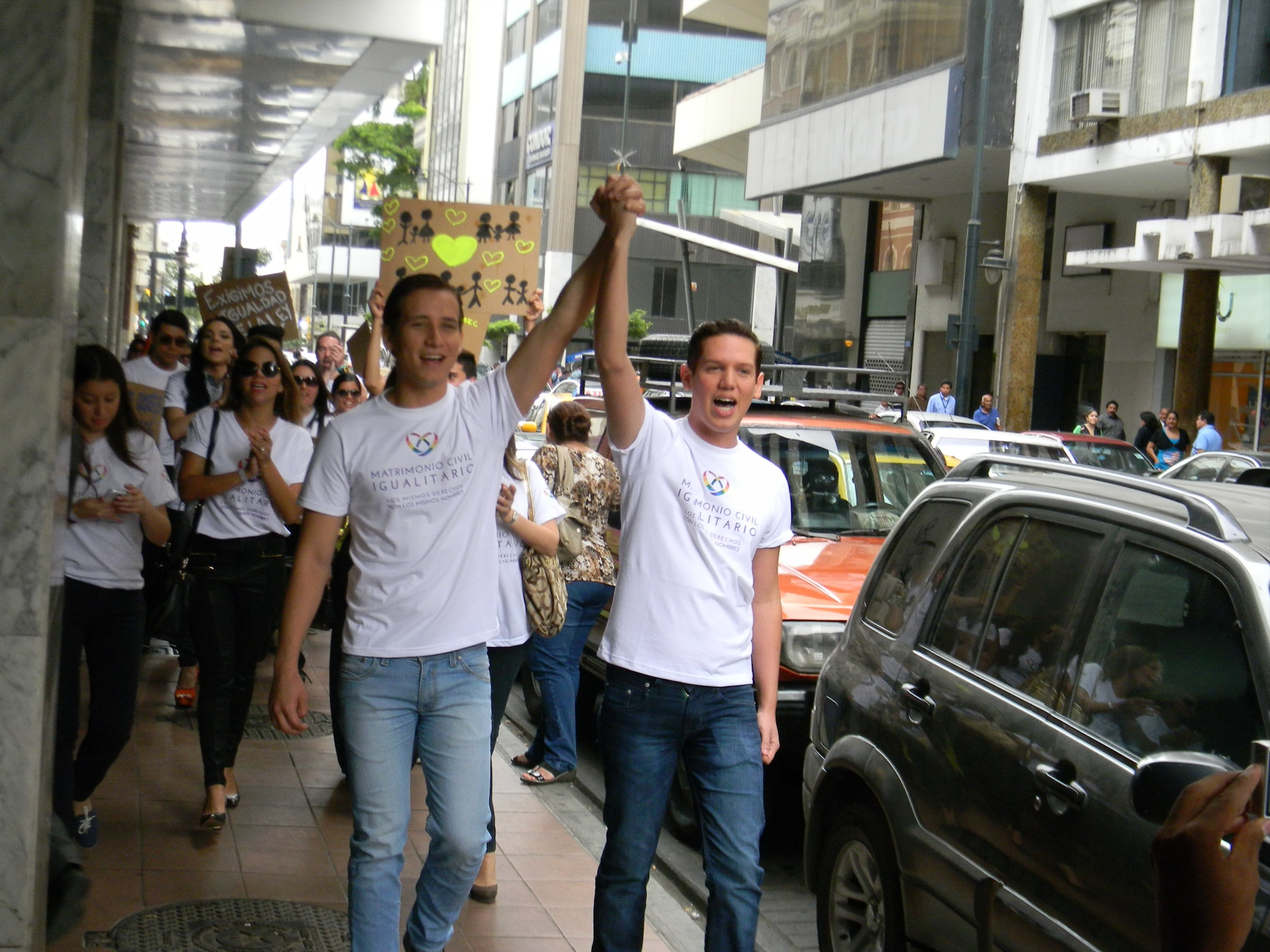
Santiago Vinces and Fernando Saltos on their way to the civil registry office in Guayaquil, as part of the "Equal Civil Marriage" campaign

On 5 August 2013, LGBT groups launched a nationwide campaign under the name "Equal Civil Marriage" (Matrimonio Civil Igualitario), with the goal of raising support for the legalization of same-sex marriage. A marriage petition was launched by activist Pamela Troya and her partner at the civil registry office in Quito. The petition was rejected days later, citing the Constitution and the Civil Code. The couple announced on 8 August that they would file a lawsuit asking a judge to order the civil registry to marry them. The lawsuit was filed on 13 August 2013, for review by the Constitutional Court, and focused heavily on the Inter-American Court of Human Rights' decision in Atala Riffo and Daughters v. Chile, which held that sexual orientation is a suspect classification. On 26 August 2013, another couple applied to marry at the civil registry office in Guayaquil. The couple, Santiago Vinces and Fernando Saltos, marched through the city to the civil registry office with a convoy of activists and supporters. Their marriage petition was denied three days later, citing the same reasons given to the first couple. In June 2014, a third couple appeared at the civil registry office in Machala, but were similarly rejected a few days later. That same month, Pamela Troya and her partner filed a legal challenge at the Constitutional Court, appealing previous judgments from lower courts that had upheld the registry's refusal to marry them. This petition was accepted for oral arguments in December 2014; however, the case stalled for the following years and made no progress.

On 9 January 2018, the Inter-American Court of Human Rights issued an advisory opinion that parties to the American Convention on Human Rights should grant same-sex couples "accession to all existing domestic legal systems of family registration, including marriage, along with all rights that derive from marriage". The advisory opinion states that:

The State must recognize and guarantee all rights derived from a family bond between persons of the same sex in accordance with the provisions of Articles 11.2 and 17.1 of the American Convention. (...) in accordance with articles 1.1, 2, 11.2, 17, and 24 of the American Convention, it is necessary to guarantee access to all the existing figures in domestic legal systems, including the right to marry. (..) To ensure the protection of all the rights of families formed by same-sex couples, without discrimination with respect to those that are constituted by heterosexual couples.

Ecuador ratified the American Convention on Human Rights on 28 December 1977 and recognized the court's jurisdiction on 4 July 1984. LGBT activists urged the government to abide by the advisory opinion, believing that Ecuador is required to recognise same-sex marriages under Article 417 of the Constitution:

The international treaties ratified by Ecuador shall be subject to the provisions set forth in the Constitution. In the case of treaties and other international instruments for human rights, principles for the benefit of the human being, the nonrestriction of rights, direct applicability, and the open clause as set forth in the Constitution shall be applied.

=== Constitutional Court ruling ===
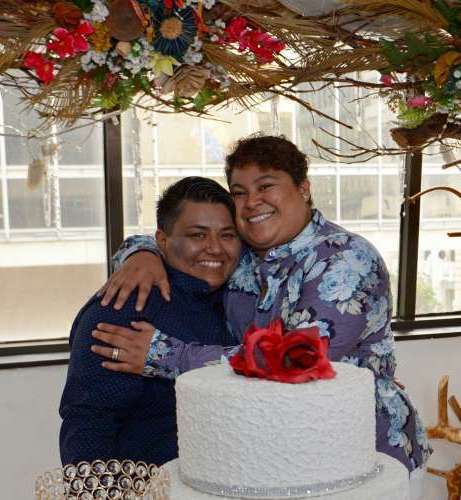
Alexandra Chávez and Michelle Avilés, the first same-sex couple to marry in Ecuador

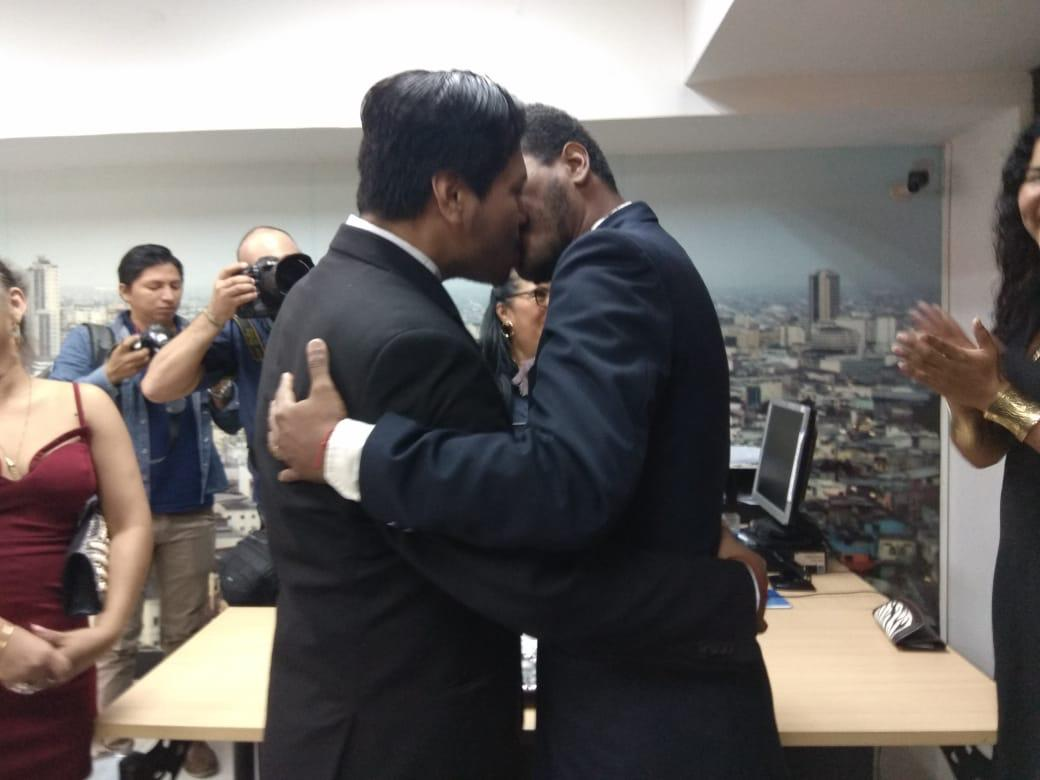
The first marriage between two men, Geovanny Vareles and Borys Alvarez, 25 July 2019, Guayaquil

Following the IACHR opinion, two same-sex couples applied for marriage licenses at the civil registry office in Cuenca. They were denied, and subsequently filed separate lawsuits, arguing that the refusal was discriminatory, unconstitutional and a violation of the American Convention on Human Rights. Citing the IACHR opinion, two family judges ruled in favour of the couples on 29 June 2018. The judges ordered the civil registry to immediately begin registering same-sex marriages, but the decision was stayed pending appeal. The two cases had the support of the Azuay Government. On 10 September 2018, the Labor Chamber of the Provincial Court of Justice overturned both decisions, ruling that the issue of same-sex marriage was a matter for the National Assembly or the Constitutional Court to address. On 28 July 2018, the president of the Constitutional Court, Alfredo Ruiz Guzmán, said he believed that a majority of judges on the court were in favour of legalizing same-sex marriage.

On 29 March 2019, a public hearing was held to determine whether the IACHR opinion on same-sex marriage was applicable to Ecuador, and whether it could be applied without a constitutional amendment or modifications to the Civil Code and the Organic Law of Identity and Civil Data Management (Spanish: Ley Orgánica de Identidad y Gestión de Datos Civiles). The case was accepted for review by the Constitutional Court on 6 March, following a request from judges of the Provincial Court of Justice of Pichincha to review the marriage petition of Efraín Soria and Javier Benalcázar. The Constitutional Court had 45 days to issue a response and resolve the case. On 20 May, another public hearing was held on a different same-sex marriage case. A ruling in the cases was originally set for 4 June 2019, but was delayed as the judges were unable to reach a decision after several hours of discussion, and announced they would continue to convene over the following days. The court issued two rulings in favour of same-sex marriage, both by a 5–4 margin, on 12 June 2019. In the first ruling, the court held that the IACHR opinion was fully binding on Ecuador and took precedence over Ecuadorian domestic law. In its second ruling, the court re-wrote article 81 of the Civil Code, as well as article 52 of the identity and civil data management law, to remove gender-specific terms which had implied married spouses to be of opposite sexes. The court ruled that Article 67 of the Constitution must be interpreted "in the sense that most favors the full validity of rights". On 14 June, the president of the Constitutional Court, Hernán Salgado Pesantes, said in a press conference that a constitutional amendment was not necessary to implement the decision, and that the National Assembly should reform the secondary laws as soon as possible. The decision also allows same-sex couples to marry in Ecuadorian embassies and diplomatic offices worldwide. The rulings took effect upon publication in the government gazette, the Registro Oficial, on 8 July 2019. Article 81 of the Civil Code was amended to read:

Matrimonio es un contrato solemne por el cual dos personas se unen con el fin de vivir juntos y auxiliarse mutuamente.

(Marriage is a solemn contract by which two persons are united in order to live together and mutually help each other.)

Human rights groups and LGBT activists welcomed the ruling, with Christian Paula of the Pakta Foundation, who had provided legal advice to several of the couples, saying that the ruling "implies that Ecuador is more egalitarian, more just than yesterday, and that it recognizes that human rights must fit all people without discrimination". In particular, LGBT activists noted that the wording used in the ruling would likely result in the legalisation of same-sex marriage in numerous other Latin American nations under the jurisdiction of the IACHR. The Catholic Church expressed opposition to the ruling. In a national broadcast aired on 20 June, President Lenín Moreno expressed his "respect" for the decision of the Constitutional Court, saying, "our duty, as citizens, and my own, as President, is to respect the decisions of all the functions and organs of the State. I maintain my absolute respect for what has been done by the Constitutional Court, which is composed of serious and honest judges." The first same-sex marriage occurred on 18 July in Guayaquil between Michelle Avilés and Alexandra Chávez.

=== Statistics ===
122 same-sex marriages took place in Ecuador in the first year of legalisation; 77 between male couples and 45 between female couples. According to statistics from the civil registry, 82 same-sex marriages were performed in 2019, 115 in 2020, and 240 in 2021, mostly in the provinces of Pichincha, Guayas and Manabí. There were also 5 same-sex divorces during those three years. By May 2024, 1,014 same-sex marriages had been performed in Ecuador. Carchi and Sucumbíos were the only two provinces where no same-sex couple had married by that time.

=== Religious performance ===
The Catholic Church, the largest Christian denomination in Ecuador, opposes same-sex marriage and does not allow its priests to officiate at such marriages. The Church has been strongly opposed to the legalization of same-sex marriage in Ecuador. In June 2019, it announced planned demonstrations in "defense of marriage between a man and a woman", and further issued a media statement incorrectly arguing that only a referendum or a law enacted by the National Assembly could legalize same-sex marriage. The Ecuadorian Episcopal Conference stated, "We do not marginalize anyone, we respect, but we also demand respect for our beliefs". Plaintiff couples in the Constitutional Court case that legalized same-sex marriage criticized the Church's position, "Families are not being destroyed, families are going to be strengthened, families are not going to end. On the contrary, it is simply the formal recognition of families that exist, that have been in hiding, forgotten by the State". The Ecuadorian Federation of LGTBI Organizations (FELGTBI; Federación Ecuatoriana de Organizaciones LGTBI) urged the Church to "take adequate advice" on Ecuadorian laws, adding that "the only thing they [priests] cause is scandal and defamation" and criticized the Church's "use of children to position their anti-rights agendas"; "They do not care about the actions of their pedophile priests, whose cases have been aired in Ecuador." In December 2023, the Holy See published Fiducia supplicans, a declaration allowing Catholic priests to bless couples who are not considered to be married according to church teaching, including the blessing of same-sex couples.

== Public opinion ==
According to a Pew Research Center survey conducted between 7 November 2013 and 26 January 2014, 16% of Ecuadorians supported same-sex marriage, while 74% were opposed. According to the 2014 AmericasBarometer (published in June 2015), 16.5% of Ecuadorians were in favour of same-sex marriage. The 2017 AmericasBarometer poll showed that 33% of Ecuadorians supported same-sex marriage.

A July 2019 survey conducted by the Vanderbilt University showed that 51% of the Ecuador public opposed same-sex marriage, 37% "strongly". The poll found a significant age gap; 69% of the Silent Generation were opposed, followed by 63% of Baby boomers, 54% of Generation X, 42% of Millennials and 17% of Generation Z.

== See also ==
- LGBT rights in Ecuador
- Recognition of same-sex unions in the Americas
- Same-sex unions in Ecuador
- Same-sex union court cases
- Decriminalization of homosexuality in Ecuador
- Timeline of LGBT history in Ecuador
