= Silvia Buendía =

Ecuadorian columnist and lawyer (1967–2026)

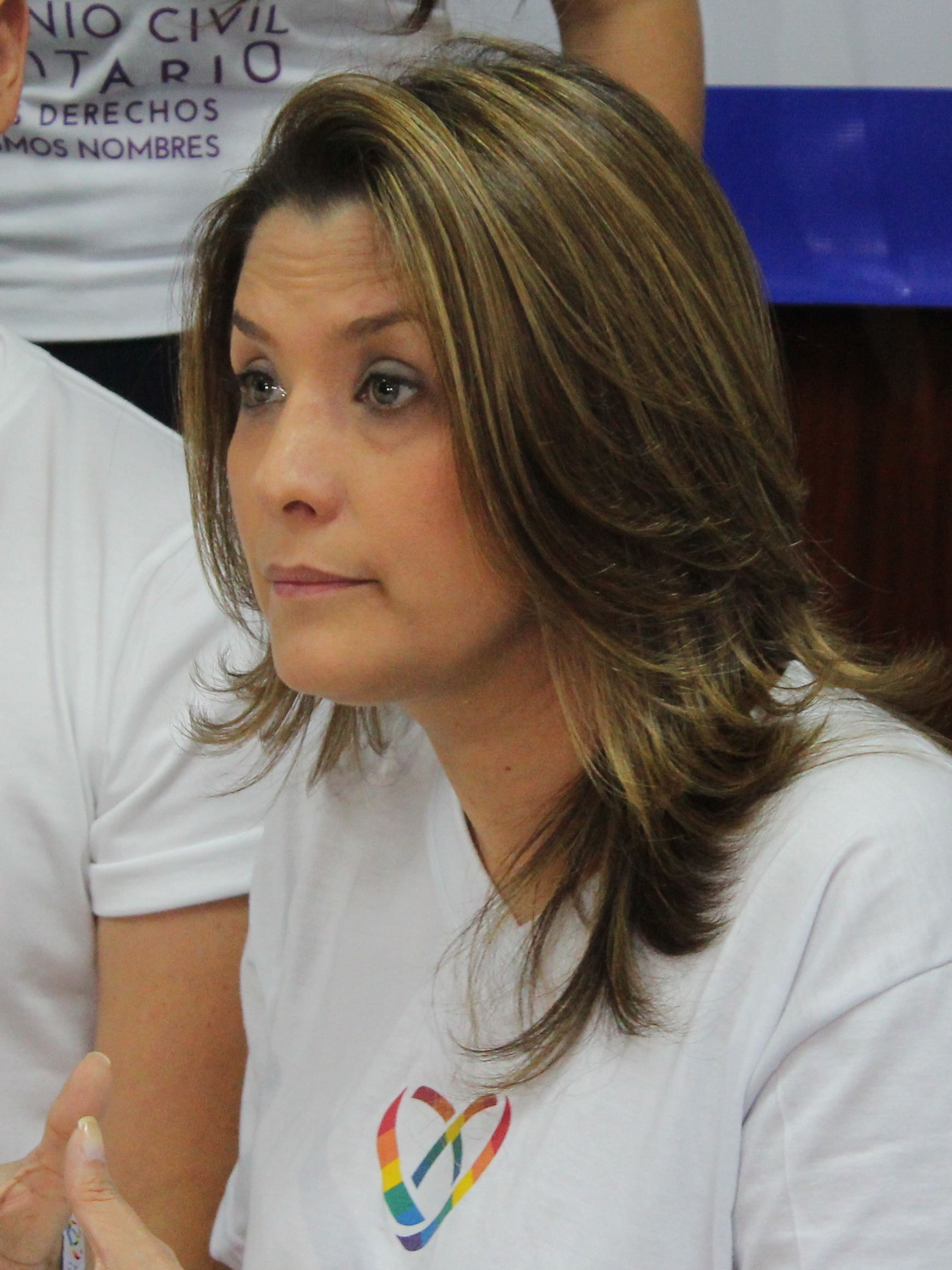
Buendía campaigning for same-sex marriage in 2013

Silvia Elena Buendía Silva (9 October 1967 – 24 August 2026) was an Ecuadorian lawyer, television host, columnist and feminist activist. She was noted for her work campaigning for the legalization of same-sex marriage in Ecuador.

== Life and career ==
Born in Guayaquil on 9 October 1967, Buendía was educated at Colegio Alemán Humboldt before graduating in law from the Universidad Católica de Santiago de Guayaquil. She started working on women's rights in the 1990s and became known as a prominent figure in the Ecuadorian feminist movement, a campaigner against femicide and for LGBTQ+ rights, becoming a spokesperson for the LGBTI Diversity Network of Ecuador (Spanish: Red LGBTI Diversidad Ecuador).

In 2016, Buendía was part of a civil society team who travelled to Geneva to contribute to a UN report on LGBTQ+ rights in Ecuador, highlighting conversion therapy and the fight for equal marriage.

Buendía wrote a column in El Telégrafo, and contributed to other newspapers and magazines in Ecuador. In the 2010s she became known as a television presenter, hosting shows such as Así Somos and Ventana Ciudadana on Ecuador TV 7.

Buendía died from cancer in Guayaquil on 24 August 2026, at the age of 58.
