= 1830 Constitution of Ecuador =

Former constitution

The 1830 Constitution of Ecuador was the first constitution governing the Republic of Ecuador. It was written by the 1830 Constituent Congress that met in the city of Riobamba, which began their work on August 14 with the assistance of 20 deputies. The constitution was adopted on September 11, 1830, by the Constituent Congress, who in 45 days, in addition to the new constitution, also issued several new laws.

== Background ==
After the disintegration of Gran Colombia, May 12, 1830, the Distrito del Sur (Southern District) formed a new nation under the name Republic of Ecuador. Under the Act of Quito of May 13, 1830, General Juan José Flores was named interim leader, with broad powers to organize the new state.

On May 31, 1830, Flores in his capacity of Encargado del Mando Civil y Militar issued a decree convoking a Constituent Assembly, which was to meet on August 10, 1830, in Riobamba. However, because of organizational difficulties and problems with transport of deputies to Riobamba, the Constituent Congress began its work on August 14, with the assistance of 20 deputies.

== Contents ==
The constitution contains a preamble and 75 articles, of which 73 are divided into nine titles. The remaining two articles are "transitory articles". There is also a final provision.

== See also ==
- Constitutional history of Ecuador
- 2008 Constitution of Ecuador
