= 2007 Ecuadorian Constituent Assembly referendum =

- 15 April 2007
- Do you approve the convocation and installation of a plenipotentiary Constituent Assembly in accordance with the electoral statute attached hereto in order to transform the institutional framework of the state and to draw up a new constitution?

Results
Choice	Votes	%
Yes	5,354,595	86.80%
No	814,323	13.20%
Valid votes	6,168,918	94.15%
Invalid or blank votes	383,571	5.85%
Total votes	6,552,489	100.00%
Registered voters/turnout	9,188,787	71.31%

A referendum on establishing a Constituent Assembly to write a new constitution was held in Ecuador on 15 April 2007. After its approval by 87% of voters, a Constituent Assembly election was held on 30 September 2007 with Correa's PAIS Alliance taking the majority of seats. The assembly was to sit for a maximum of 180 days with a possible 60-day-extension.

== Background ==
The referendum was called by President Rafael Correa on 15 January 2007, and was originally planned to be held on 18 March 2007. On 23 January 2007 the Electoral Court decided to send the referendum call to Congress for consideration, which later approved it in a vote that was boycotted by a large number of parliamentarians. A poll taken in January showed 70% of voters to be in favour of the proposal.

== Results ==
Choice	Votes	%
For	5,354,595	86.80
Against	814,323	13.20
Total	6,168,918	100.00
Valid votes	6,168,918	94.15
Invalid votes	332,484	5.07
Blank votes	51,087	0.78
Total votes	6,552,489	100.00
Registered voters/turnout	9,188,787	71.31
Source: Cairn.info
