= Ecuadorian Constituent Assembly =

Asamblea Nacional Constituyente

Type
- Type: Constituent Assembly

Leadership
- President: Alberto Acosta; Fernando Cordero Cueva
- Seats: 130 asambleistas

Meeting place
- Montecristi, Manabí, Ecuador

Website
- Official website

The Ecuadorian Constituent Assembly was a 2007–2008 constitutional assembly in Ecuador, which drafted the 2008 Constitution of Ecuador, approved via the Ecuadorian constitutional referendum, 2008.

On 30 September 2007 an election for a constituent assembly was held in Ecuador following the referendum on this issue held on 15 April 2007. 130 delegates were elected: 24 members from national lists, 100 representing the provinces and six for emigrants living outside Ecuador. President Rafael Correa's PAIS Alliance won a landslide victory, winning 74 of the 130 seats, giving the party the power to make the substantial constitutional reforms for which Correa had been calling.

The assembly first convened on November 29, 2007 in Montecristi, and was given six months to write a new constitution, with a possible two-month extension. In late July, 2008, the assembly approved a draft constitution comprising 494 articles, which was approved by the registered voters of Ecuador in September 2008 with a 63.93% to 28.10% margin of victory.

== Setting up the assembly ==
Although the Constituent Assembly was planned to be set up on 31 October 2007, this was postponed for a month due to delays in the official pronouncement of the final election results. The Assembly had six months (with a possible extension of two months) to draft a new constitution, which would then have to be ratified in a referendum.

The Assembly convened on 29 November 2007, elected its leadership and then heard a proposal to dismiss Congress on the grounds that it was corrupt. A vote was taken, which was televised live, and 110 out of the 128 delegates present voted for Congress's dismissal.

The intentions of the Constituent Assembly had been publicly known since the results of the elections in October and consequently some members of Congress had vowed to resist their dismissal. Congress had originally approved the idea of a plebiscite for the creation of a Constituent Assembly on the condition that Congress itself would not be dismissed. However, when the potential powers of the assembly were expanded, Congress objected. Correa submitted the new terms of the plebiscite to the Electoral Tribunal and not to Congress, thus circumventing Congress's power. This led to various other confrontations between Correa and Congress. In late November, Jorge Cevallos, the head of Congress, said that the National Congress would submit to the decision of the Constituent Assembly saying that he and other legislators were not willing to "risk their lives over" the issue and that Ecuadoreans had made their decision in the referendum. It was thought unlikely that any resistance or appeal to international courts would have much effect on the proceedings of the Constituent Assembly. With Congress dismissed, the Constituent Assembly assumed the legislative functions in the country. A 13-member commission would examine potential bills to be passed by the entire assembly.

Besides removing Congress and assuming legislative capacities, the Assembly also removed Ecuador's attorney general, bank superintendent and some other state officials.

== Workings ==
According to a poll from late November 2007, 76% supported confirming Correa as president, 69% supported dismissing Congress, and 59% supported taking full powers. Support for gaining the ability to dismiss any official who failed to perform his duty was at 52%, and only 35% supported the Assembly's immunity from prosecution.

The Constituent Assembly will likely propose allowing a second term as president, as well as a provision to recall the incumbent president after half of the current term has expired.

A national discussion on women's rights was raised after PAIS lawmaker María Soledad Vela proposed to enshrine a women's right to sexual happiness in the constitution; she later clarified that she primarily wanted to provoke a discussion on clearer laws regarding life, health and sex education.

By early May, 38 of a planned 256 articles had been approved already; the current topic of discussion at that time was whether to allow presidential reelection.

In June 2008, the president of the CA, Alberto Acosta, resigned due to his opposition to speeding up the debate on the remaining articles to meet the deadline of 26 July 2008. He was replaced by Fernando Cordero Cueva on 24 June 2008.

The last points were approved on 17 July 2008, the constitution was to be presented on 24 July 2008 and the referendum was expected to be held on 28 September 2008. The new constitution would have 494 articles.

Two articles legalising same-sex unions and declaring Quechua an official language were dropped in the last minute; polls see a majority in favour of the new constitution, but a lot of people are undecided.

Of the 130 members, 94 voted in favour of the draft (consisting of 444 articles), which would be Ecuador's twentieth constitution since its inception as a sovereign state. It would enable Correa to run for two new terms, and also gives the president the right to dissolve Congress within the first three years of its four-year term.
