= 1997 Ecuadorian referendum =

A fourteen-part referendum was held in Ecuador on 25 May 1997. Voters were asked whether they approved of the dismissal of President Abdalá Bucaram by the National Congress, the appointment of Fabián Alarcón as interim President for twelve months, the calling of a Constitutional Assembly, whether a Constitutional Assembly should be elected by direct elections or by appointment, whether spending limits should be introduced for election campaigns, whether voters should be able to modify electoral lists, whether National Assembly elections should be held alongside the first or second round of presidential elections, whether political parties that fail to cross the 5% threshold in two consecutive elections should be deregistered, whether the Supreme Electoral Tribunal (TSE) should reflect the political makeup of the National Congress, whether the National Congress should appoint managers of state-owned companies with a two-thirds majority, reforms to the justice system, allowing the Supreme Court to appoint judicial authority member, whether elected officials who commit a criminal offence should be removed from office, and whether the National Assembly should implement the 13 proposals. All eleven proposals were approved by voters.

After all yes/no questions were approved, a Constitutional Assembly was subsequently elected in 1997 and produced a new constitution which entered into force on 10 August 1998.

== Background ==
On 6 February 1997 the Constitutional Assembly had removed President Bucaram from office due to "mental retardation". However, it had not been done by a majority of 67 of the 100 members as proscribed by the constitution. On 8 April interim President Alarcón issued decree 201, calling a referendum on 14 questions, as allowed by article 58 of the constitution.

== Results ==
=== Yes/no questions ===
| Issue | For | | Against | | Invalid/ blank | Total | Registered voters | Turnout |
| Issue | Votes | % | Votes | % | Invalid/ blank | Total | Registered voters | Turnout |
|---|---|---|---|---|---|---|---|---|
| Removal of President Abdalá Bucaram from office | 2,488,778 | 75.76 | 796,154 | 24.24 | 798,174 | 4,083,106 | 6,890,832 | 59.25 |
| Appointment of Fabián Alarcón Rivera as interim President | 2,241,299 | 68.37 | 1,036,722 | 31.63 | 802,602 | 4,080,623 | 6,890,832 | 59.20 |
| Election of a Constitutional Assembly | 1,903,962 | 64.58 | 1,044,188 | 35.42 | 1,130,671 | 4,078,821 | 6,890,832 | 59.19 |
| Spending limits on election campaigns | 1,999,776 | 69.87 | 862,377 | 30.13 | 1,218,078 | 4,080,231 | 6,890,832 | 59.21 |
| Deregister parties failing to cross the 5% threshold twice in a row | 1,892,180 | 68.45 | 872,330 | 31.55 | 1,314,947 | 4,079,457 | 6,890,832 | 59.20 |
| TSE composition to reflect party strength | 1,592,945 | 58.67 | 1,122,234 | 41.33 | 1,361,927 | 4,077,106 | 6,890,832 | 59.17 |
| National Assembly to appoint heads of state-owned companies | 1,373,957 | 50.75 | 1,333,339 | 49.25 | 1,369,447 | 4,076,743 | 6,890,832 | 59.16 |
| Judicial reforms | 1,651,162 | 60.73 | 1,067,724 | 39.27 | 1,356,506 | 4,075,392 | 6,890,832 | 59.14 |
| Supreme Court to elect judicial authorities | 1,512,406 | 55.97 | 1,189,976 | 44.03 | 1,372,931 | 4,075,313 | 6,890,832 | 59.14 |
| Sacking of elected officials who commit criminal offences | 1,615,292 | 60.25 | 1,065,850 | 39.75 | 1,393,477 | 4,074,619 | 6,890,832 | 59.13 |
| Allowing electoral list modification | 1,250,663 | 51.65 | 1,170,865 | 48.35 | 1,649,311 | 4,070,839 | 6,890,832 | 59.08 |
| National Assembly to pass reforms within 60 days | 1,790,383 | 66.88 | 886,459 | 33.12 | 1,396,259 | 4,073,101 | 6,890,832 | 59.11 |
Source: Direct Democracy

=== Method of election of a Constitutional Assembly ===
| Choice | Votes | % |
|---|---|---|
| Purely elected | 1,454,306 | 59.85 |
| Partially elected, partially appointed | 975,807 | 40,15 |
| Invalid/blank votes | 1,643,431 | – |
| Total | 4,073,544 | 100 |
| Registered voters/turnout | 6,890,832 | 59.12 |
Source: Direct Democracy

=== Timing of National Assembly elections ===
| Choice | Votes | % |
|---|---|---|
| Alongside first round of presidential elections | 1,469,052 | 61.30 |
| Alongside second round of presidential elections | 927,290 | 38.70 |
| Invalid/blank votes | 1,678,271 | – |
| Total | 4,074,613 | 100 |
| Registered voters/turnout | 6,890,832 | 59.13 |
Source: Direct Democracy
