= Freedom Party (Ecuador) =

Freedom Party Partido Libertad
- Abbreviation: PL
- Founded: 2001 (original); 2007 (second)
- Dissolved: 2003
- Ideology: Progressivism; Humanism

The Freedom Party (Partido Libertad, PL) was a progressive and humanist party in Ecuador, mostly based in small and medium enterprise politics. It was founded around 2001 and dissolved in 2003.

In the legislative elections, held on 20 October 2002, the party won 1 out of 100 seats. Its candidate, César Alarcón, won 1.2% of the vote in the presidential election held on the same day. After the dissolution of the party in 2003, its only parliamentary representative, Hugo Ibarra, became an independent.

In 2007, the party was reregistered to participate in the elections of the 2007 Constitutional assembly. The party would go on to win 0.47% of the national popular vote and no seats.
