= 2008 Ecuadorian constitutional referendum =

- 28 September 2008
- Do you approve the text of the new Political Constitution of the Republic prepared by the Constituent Assembly?
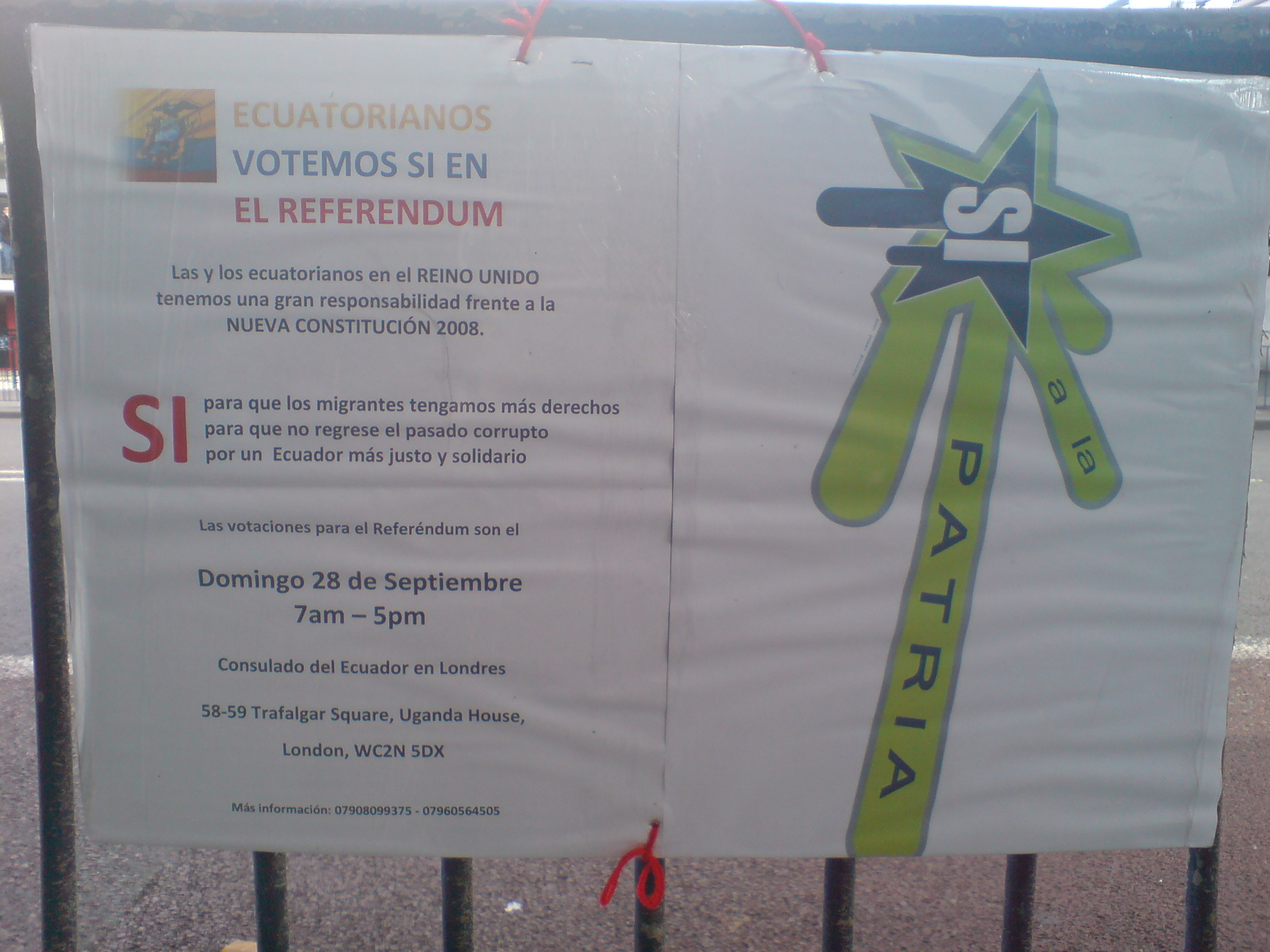
- Poster aimed at the Ecuadorian diaspora in London

Results
Choice	Votes	%
Yes	4,722,073	68.91%
No	2,075,764	30.29%
Blank votes	55,071	0.80%
Valid votes	6,852,908	92.77%
Invalid votes	533,684	7.23%
Total votes	7,386,592	100.00%
Registered voters/turnout	9,754,883	75.72%

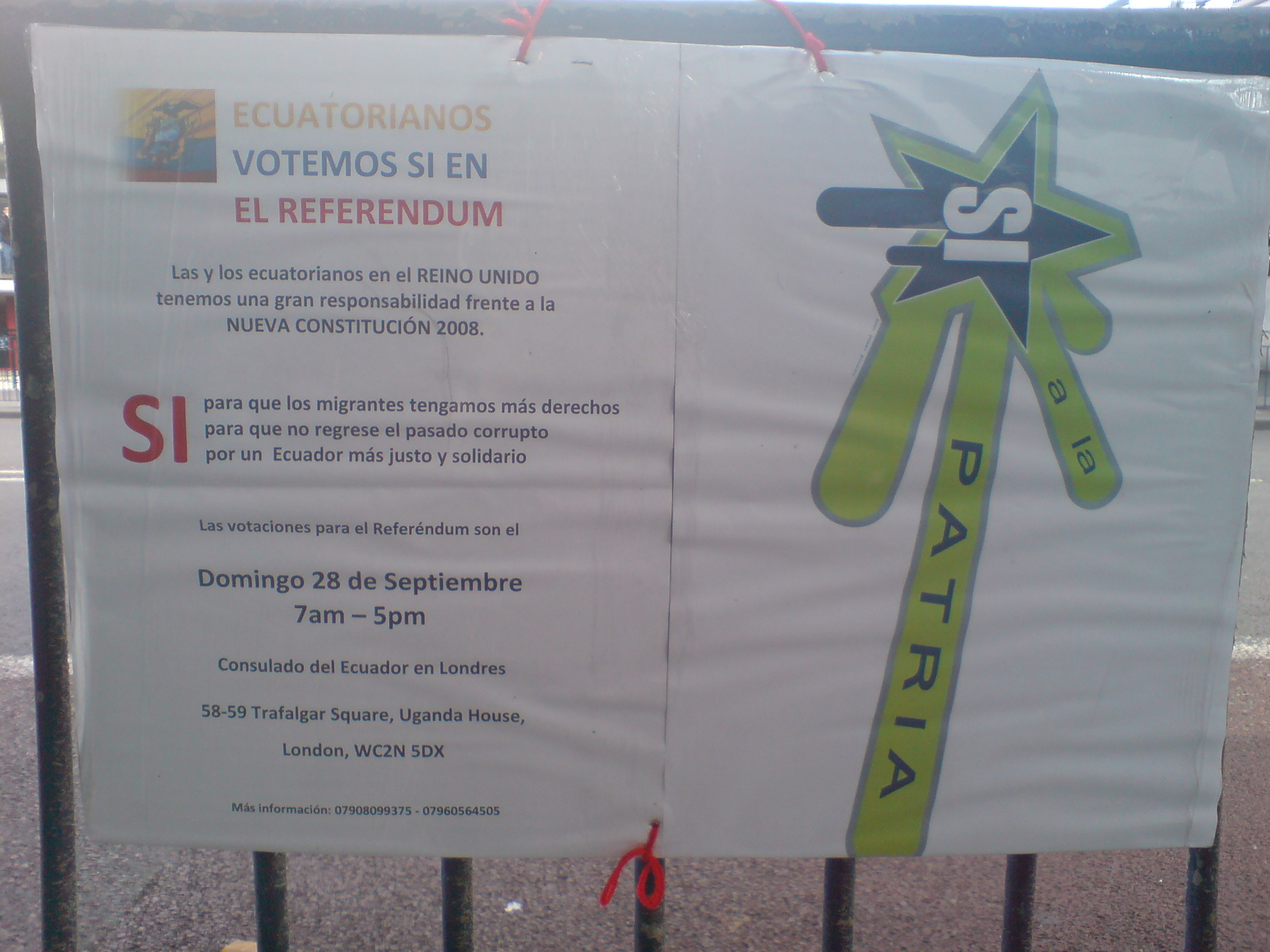
Poster aimed at the Ecuadorian diaspora in London

A constitutional referendum was held in Ecuador on 28 September 2008 to ratify or reject the constitution drafted by the Ecuadorian Constituent Assembly elected in 2007. The new constitution was approved by 69% of voters.

Following its approval, early elections were held in April 2009.

== Background ==
President Rafael Correa had initially stated he would resign if the constitution were rejected, but later stated he would finish his term.

A Cedatos/Gallup poll from May 2008 saw 41% in favour of the constitution draft, 31% against, and 28% not sure. Another Cedatos/Gallup poll from June 2008 showed 37% support.

Provisions include the right to healthcare, food, social security, and education as well as an emphasis on Latin American integration. The more controversial proposals include allowing a second four-year term for the president and legalising civil unions.

== Conduct ==
The EU sent an election observation team.

== Results ==
Choice	Votes	%
For	4,722,073	69.46
Against	2,075,764	30.54
Total	6,797,837	100.00
Valid votes	6,797,837	92.03
Invalid/blank votes	588,755	7.97
Total votes	7,386,592	100.00
Registered voters/turnout	9,754,883	75.72
Source: Direct Democracy
