= 2007 Ecuadorian Constituent Assembly election =

- 30 September 2007

All 130 seats in the Constituent Assembly
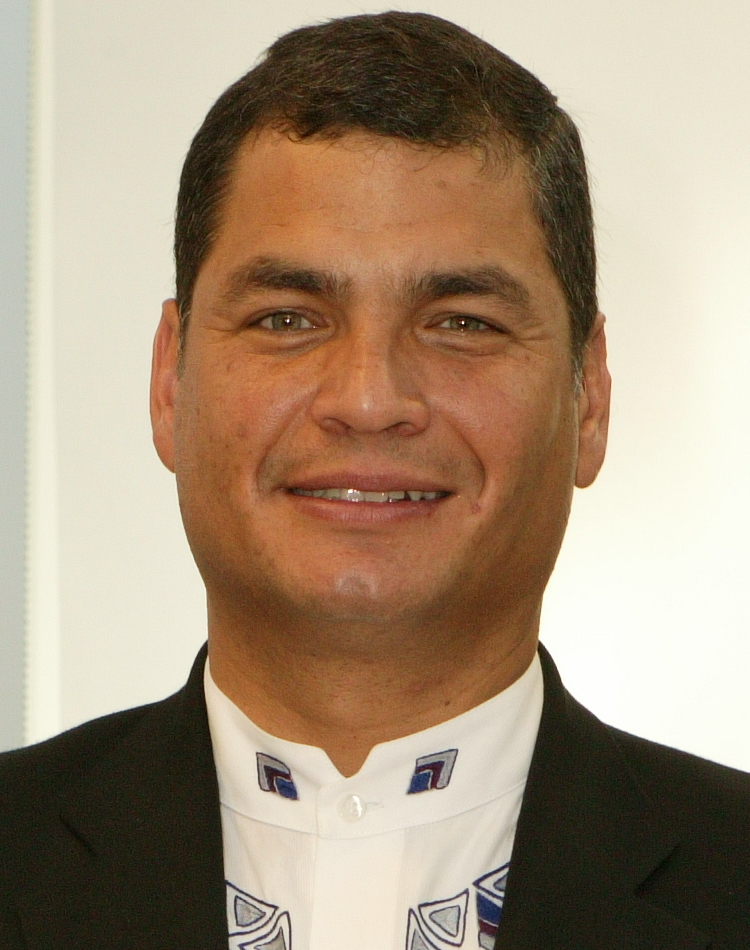

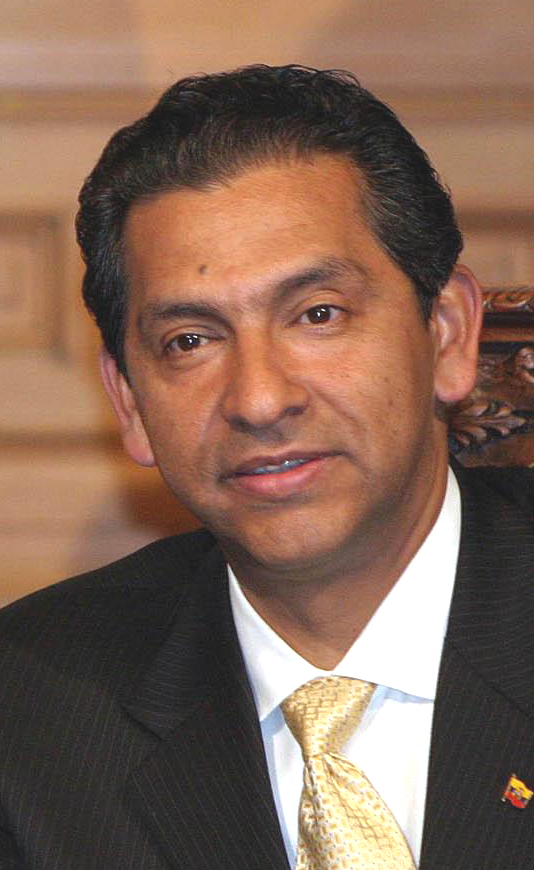

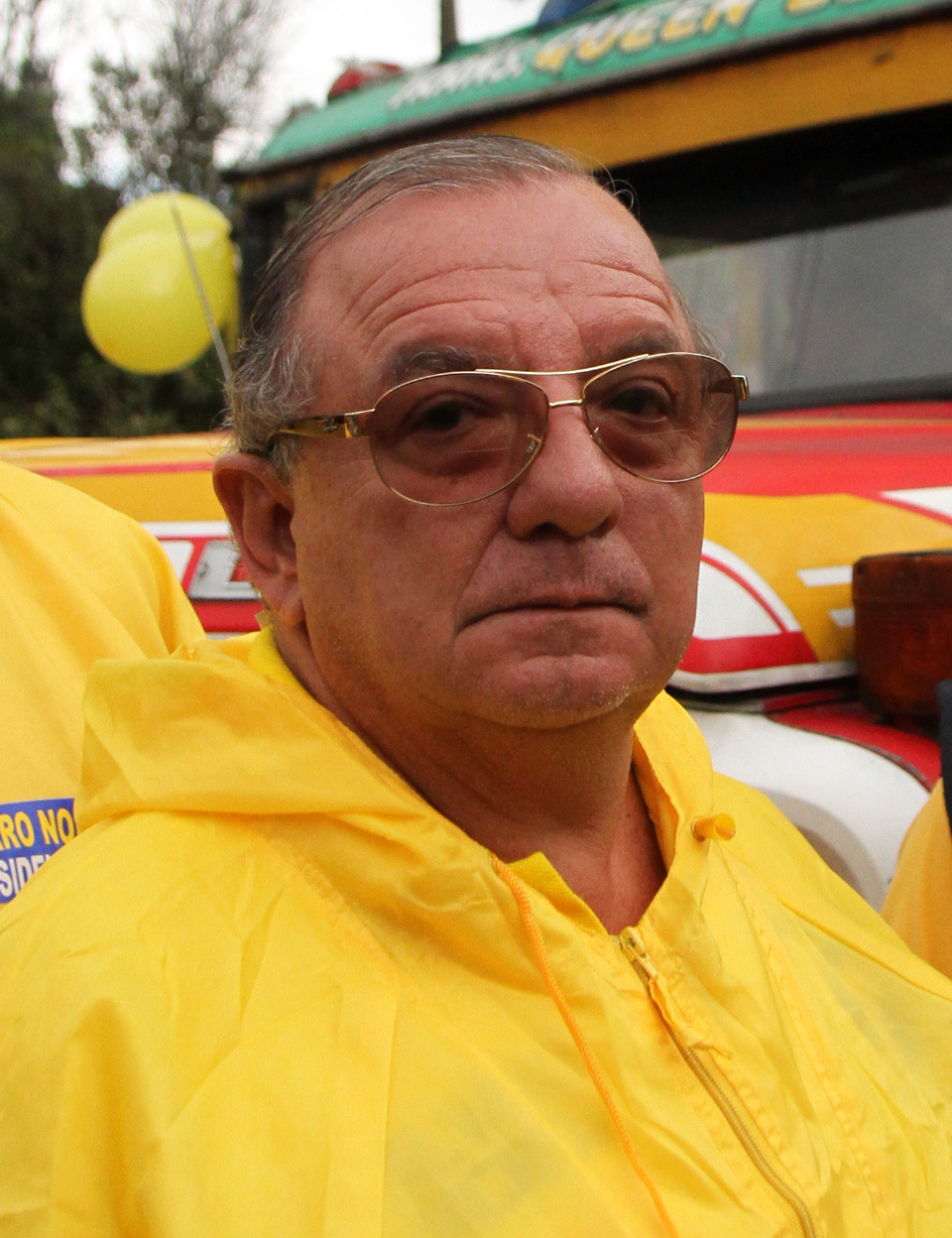

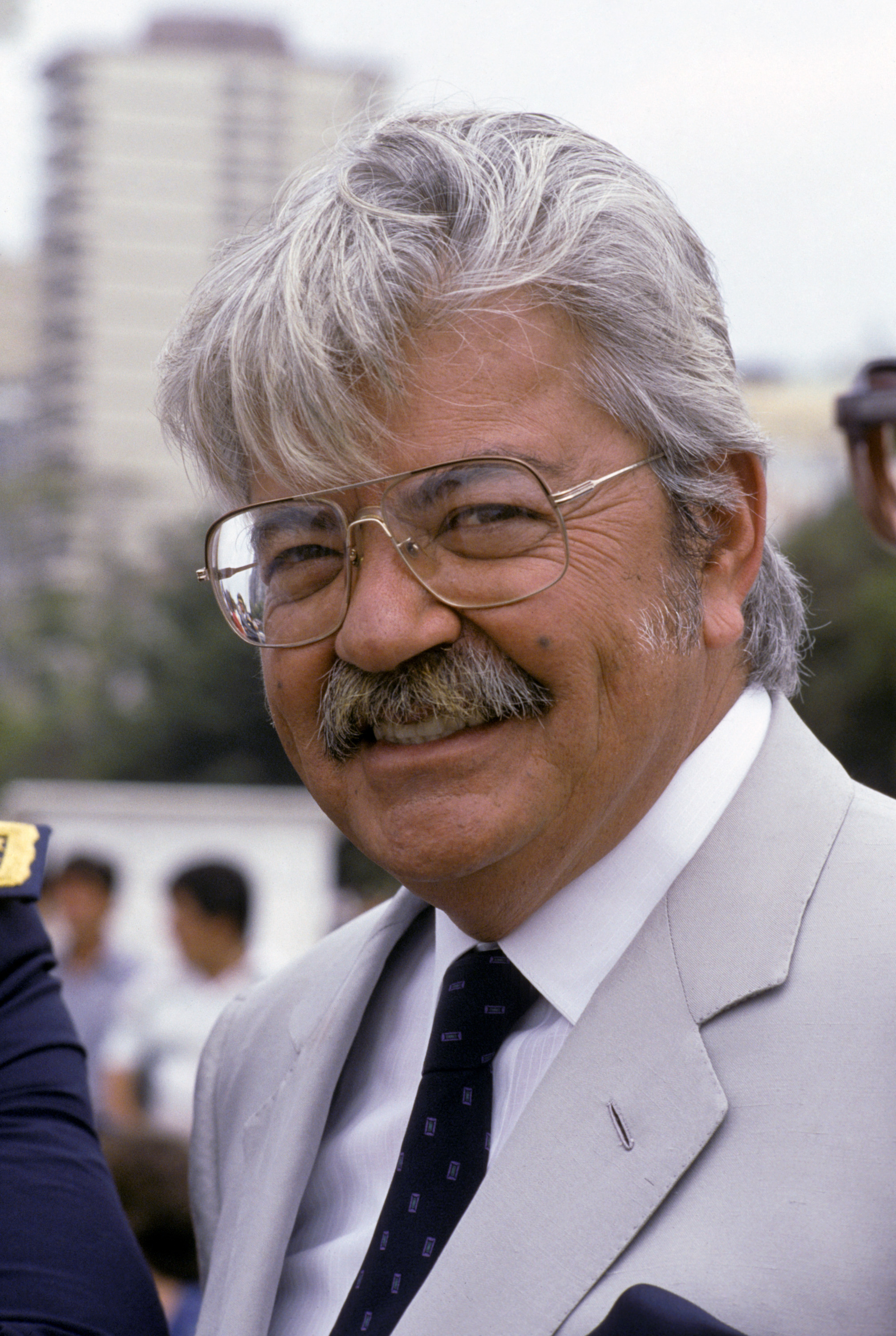
	Majority party	Minority party
Leader	Rafael Correa	Lucio Gutiérrez
Party	PAIS Alliance	PSP
Leader since	2006	2000
Seats won	80	19
Percentage	69.47%	7.28%
	Third party	Fourth party
Leader	Álvaro Noboa	León Febres Cordero
Party	PRIAN	PSC
Leader since	2002	1984
Seats won	8	5
Percentage	6.62%	3.88%
Legislator before election
León Febres Cordero
PSC
Resulting Legislator
Alberto Acosta
PAIS Alliance

Constituent Assembly elections were held in Ecuador on 30 September 2007. A Constituent Assembly was established following an April referendum on doing so. A total of 130 delegates were elected; 24 members from national lists, 100 elected from provincial constituencies and six for overseas votes.

The large number of candidates and lists (26 national lists, 428 provincial lists, 44 emigrant lists) caused the elections to be the most complex in Ecuador's history. Although polls indicated that Correa's PAIS Alliance would win a plurality in the election, but not a majority, PAIS won a landslide victory, winning 80 of the 130 seats, giving the party the power to dismiss Congress and make the substantial constitutional reforms for which Correa has been calling. PAIS won all six foreign seats.

The Constituent Assembly was to be set up on 31 October 2007 and have six months (with a possible extension of two months) to draft a new constitution, which will then have to be ratified in a referendum. However, the installation of the Assembly was delayed to 29 November 2007 due to delays in the official proclamation of the final result.

== Results ==
Party	Votes	%	Seats			
Party	Votes	%	National	Provincial	Overseas	Total
PAIS Alliance	2,806,004	69.47	15	59	6	80
January 21 Patriotic Society Party	294,240	7.28	2	17	0	19
Institutional Renewal Party of National Action	267,605	6.62	2	6	0	8
Social Christian Party	156,840	3.88	1	4	0	5
Ethics and Democracy Network	80,927	2.00	1	2	0	3
Democratic People's Movement	68,060	1.68	1	3	0	4
A New Option	45,127	1.12	1	1	0	2
Ecuadorian Roldosist Party	32,332	0.80	0	1	0	1
PS-FA–MUPP-NP Alliance	28,635	0.71	0	4	0	4
Movement for National Honesty	28,198	0.70	1	0	0	1
National Agreement	26,358	0.65	0	0	0	0
ID–MPC Alliance	21,759	0.54	0	2	0	2
Freedom Party	19,036	0.47	0	0	0	0
Ecuadorian White Movement for the Vindication of the Poor	17,813	0.44	0	0	0	0
Christian Democratic Union	17,450	0.43	0	0	0	0
Independent Movement of Committed Seculars	17,264	0.43	0	0	0	0
Movement Ecuador's Force	16,445	0.41	0	0	0	0
Christian Civic Compromise with the Community C4	15,594	0.39	0	0	0	0
MCSXXI–MAE–MTF Alliance	15,279	0.38	0	0	0	0
National Democratic Coalition	13,285	0.33	0	0	0	0
Independent Movement Democratic Pole	13,037	0.32	0	0	0	0
National Reconciliation	11,663	0.29	0	0	0	0
Independent Just and Solidary Movement	7,883	0.20	0	0	0	0
National Movement for Social Reconciliation	7,026	0.17	0	0	0	0
Thousandfold Victory	6,815	0.17	0	0	0	0
Social Integration and Transformation	4,718	0.12	0	0	0	0
Citizens' Independent Movement Future Already			0	1	0	1
Total	4,039,393	100.00	24	100	6	130
Valid votes	4,039,393	78.67				
Invalid/blank votes	1,094,896	21.33				
Total votes	5,134,289	100.00				
Source: TSE
