= 2008 Constitution of Ecuador =

Current constitution of the Republic of Ecuador

The Constitution of Ecuador is the supreme law of Ecuador. The current constitution has been in place since 2008. It is the country's 20th constitution.

== History ==
Ecuador has had new constitutions promulgated in 1830, 1835, 1843, 1845, 1851, 1852, 1861, 1869, 1878, 1884, 1897, 1906, 1929, 1938, 1945, 1946, 1967, 1978, and 1998. Following his election as President of Ecuador, Rafael Correa called for a referendum on establishing a Constituent Assembly to write a new constitution for the country, which was held on April 15, 2007, and passed with 81.7% approval. The elections for the Ecuadorian Constituent Assembly were held on September 30, 2007. With 74 seats, Rafael Correa's political party, PAIS Alliance, won the majority of the 130 available seats. The assembly first convened on November 29, 2007, in Montecristi, and was given six months to write a new constitution, with a possible two-month extension. On July 24, 2008, the assembly approved a draft constitution consisting of 494 articles.

When Ecuador began the process of writing a new constitution, they received help from the Community Environmental Legal Defense Fund to draft environmental laws giving nature and ecosystems rights.

The Constitution was approved by the electorate in the constitutional referendum in September 2008 by 63.93% to 28.10%.

== Analysis ==
=== Environmental rights ===
The Constitution is the first in the world to recognize legally enforceable rights of nature, or ecosystem rights. Article 71-74 prohibits the extraction of non-renewable resources in protected areas. Moreover, the production of monocultures will be avoided for reforestation and rehabilitation of the soil. The state will also protect the intellectual property of collective work based on national biodiversity and begin to recognize the rights of nature.

=== International investment ===
The Constitution prohibits Ecuador from yielding jurisdiction over private trade or contract disputes to external organizations. As a result, Ecuador was forced to withdraw from the International Centre for Settlement of Investment Disputes (ICSID).

=== Food sovereignty ===
The constitution is one of the first in the world to recognise the right to food.

Article 281, labelled Food Sovereignty, reads: "Food Sovereignty constitutes an objective and strategic obligation from the State to guarantee its people, communities, pueblos and nationalities self sufficiency in healthy food, culturally appropriate in a permanent form." This entails the following state responsibilities:

1. Incite production, transformation of the agro-food and fishery of small to medium size units of production, communities and social and solidarity economies.
2. Adopt fiscal politics, tributaries and tariffs to protect the agro-food sector and national fishery to avoid dependency on food imports.
3. Strengthen diversification and the introduction of ecological and organic technologies in the production of agriculture.
4. Promote redistributive politics to permit access of farmers to soil, water and other productive resources.
5. Establish preferential financial mechanisms for small and medium producers, facilitating the acquisition of the means of production.
6. Promote the preservation and rehabilitation of agro biodiversity linked to ancestral knowledge; likewise its use, conservation and free seed exchange.
7. Ensure that animals destined for human consumption are healthy and raised in sound environments.
8. Assure the development of scientific investigation and innovative technologies are appropriate to guarantee food sovereignty.
9. Regulate under bio-security standards the use and development of biotechnology, including experimentation and commercial use.
10. Strengthen the development of organizations and networks of producers and consumers and the commercialization and distribution of food to promote equity within rural and urban spaces.
11. Generate just and solidarity systems of distribution and commercialization of food. Impede monopolistic practices and any type of speculation with food products.
12. Supply food to the victims of anthropogenic or natural disasters in risk of accessing food. International food donations should not affect health or future production of local food.
13. Prevent and protect the population from consuming contaminated food or places their health in risk or if science has uncertainties of its effects.
14. Acquire food and primary materials for social and food programs, prioritizing in associative networks of small producers.

Article 15 protects agricultural, wild and genetic biodiversity by prohibiting genetically modified seeds and crops. The President and the National assembly can introduce exceptions, but genetic modification are not allowed if its intervenes with food sovereignty.

=== Drug liberalization ===
According to Article 364 of the 2008 Constitution of Ecuador, the Ecuadorian state does not see drug consumption as a crime but only as a health concern. Since June 2013 the State drugs regulatory office, CONSEP, has published a table that establishes maximum quantities carried by persons so as to be considered in legal possession and that person as not a seller of drugs.

=== Recognition of same-sex relationships ===
Within the Ecuadorian Constitution adopted in 2008, Article 67 limits marriage to the union of a man and a woman. ("El matrimonio es la unión entre hombre y mujer...") Same-sex couples became eligible for de facto civil unions based on Article 68, which specifies that unmarried couples in stable and monogamous unions enjoy the same rights and obligations of married couples. In 2015, the civil code was updated to allow for civil unions to be contracted without a requirement for prior cohabitation.

An unofficial English language translation of Article 68:

The stable and monogamous union between two persons without any other marriage ties who have a common-law home, for the lapse of time and under the conditions and circumstances provided for by law, shall enjoy the same rights and obligations of those families bound by formal marriage ties. (Note: In Spanish, the official version of Article 68 reads as follows: La unión estable y monogámica entre dos personas libres de vínculo matrimonial que formen un hogar de hecho, por el lapso y bajo las condiciones y circunstancias que señale la ley, generará los mismos derechos y obligaciones que tienen las familias constituidas mediante matrimonio. Article 68, Constitución de la República del Ecuador)

Article 68 also limits adoption rights to opposite-sex couples.

In 2019, Ecuador's Constitutional Court legalized same-sex marriage.

=== Recognition of sexual orientation and gender identity ===
Article 11, paragraph two of the Constitution of the Republic of Ecuador reaffirmed as a fundamental right to sexual orientation and included for the first time and even globally gender identity. Until 2008, no constitution in the world recognized gender identity.

== See also ==
- 1830 Constitution of Ecuador
- Ecuadorian Constituent Assembly
- Constitution
- Constitutional law
- Constitutional economics
- Constitutionalism
- Case No. 111-97-TC (1997), a landmark decision by the Constitutional Tribunal of Ecuador on 25 November 1997 regarding the country's sodomy laws
- Recognition of same-sex unions in Ecuador (2009), civil unions for same-sex couples were legalized by the approval of the 2008 Constitution of Ecuador
- Legal Precedent (2009), right to change legal names female to male and vice versa for people transgender and intersex by the approval of the 2008 Constitution of Ecuador
