= Rafael Correa =

President of Ecuador from 2007 to 2017

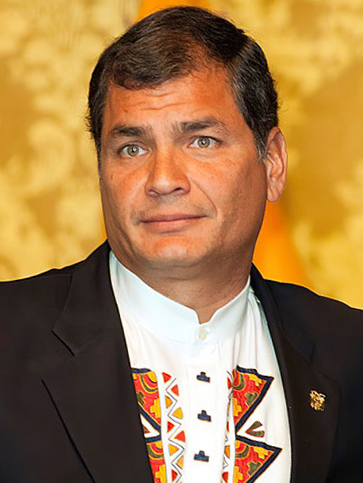
- Correa in 2013

45th President of Ecuador
- In office 15 January 2007 – 24 May 2017
- Vice President: Lenín Moreno (2007–2013); Jorge Glas (2013–2017)
- Preceded by: Alfredo Palacio
- Succeeded by: Lenín Moreno

President of the PAIS Alliance
- In office 2 April 2006 – 1 May 2017
- Preceded by: Party established
- Succeeded by: Lenín Moreno

Minister of Economy and Finance
- In office 20 April 2005 – 9 August 2005
- President: Alfredo Palacio
- Preceded by: Mauricio Yépez
- Succeeded by: Magdalena Barreiro

Personal details
- Born: Rafael Vicente Correa Delgado; 6 April 1963 (age 63) Guayaquil, Ecuador
- Party: PAIS Alliance (2006–2018); Citizen Revolution Movement (since 2018)
- Other political affiliations: Acuerdo Nacional (since 2018)
- Spouse: Anne Malherbe Gosselin (m. 1992)
- Children: 3
- Education: Catholic University of Guayaquil (BA); Université catholique de Louvain (MA); University of Illinois, Urbana-Champaign (MS, PhD)

Rafael Vicente Correa Delgado (Spanish pronunciation: [rafaˈel βiˈsente koˈre.a ðelˈɣaðo]; born 6 April 1963) is an Ecuadorian politician and economist who served as the 45th president of Ecuador from 2007 to 2017. The leader of the PAIS Alliance political movement from its foundation until 2017, Correa is a democratic socialist and his administration focused on the implementation of left-wing policies. Internationally, he served as president pro tempore of the UNASUR. Since 2017, he has been living with his family in Belgium.

Born to a lower middle-class family in Guayaquil, Correa studied economics at the Universidad Católica de Santiago de Guayaquil, the University of Louvain (UCLouvain), and the University of Illinois, where he received his PhD. Returning to Ecuador, in 2005 he became the Minister for the Economy under President Alfredo Palacio, successfully lobbying Congress for increased spending on health and education projects.

Correa won the presidency in the 2006 general election on a platform criticizing the established political elites. Taking office in January 2007, he sought to move away from Ecuador's neoliberal economic model by reducing the influence of the World Bank and International Monetary Fund. He oversaw the introduction of a new constitution, being reelected in 2009 and again in the 2013 general election.

Correa's presidency was part of the Latin American pink tide, a turn toward leftist governments in the region, allying himself with Hugo Chávez's Venezuela and bringing Ecuador into the Bolivarian Alliance for the Americas in June 2009. Using its own form of 21st century socialism, Correa's administration increased government spending, reducing poverty, raising the minimum wage and increasing Ecuador's standard of living. From 2006 to 2016, poverty decreased from 36.7% to 22.5% and annual per capita GDP growth was 1.5% (as compared to 0.6% over the previous two decades). At the same time, economic inequality, as measured by the Gini coefficient, decreased from 0.55 to 0.47. By the end of Correa's tenure, the 50% drop in the price of oil since 2014 had caused Ecuador's economy to enter a recession, resulting in government spending being slashed.

After leaving office, Correa feuded with his successor, Lenín Moreno. Since leaving office in 2017, he has lived in self-imposed exile in Belgium, which granted him asylum. Correa continues to exercise political influence in Ecuador through social media and as a leading figure in his political party. Ecuadorean politics remains polarized between pro- and anti-Correa forces.

In 2018, a judge in Ecuador ordered a warrant for Correa's arrest after he failed to appear in court during a trial surrounding the kidnapping of his political opponent Fernando Balda in 2012. Interpol rejected requests by the Ecuadorian government to issue a red notice requesting Correa's arrest in connection with the kidnapping case, calling it "obviously a political matter." In 2020, Correa was tried in absentia by an Ecuadorian criminal court, convicted of accepting bribes in exchange for public contracts from 2012 and 2016, sentenced to eight years in prison, and banned from seeking office for 25 years. Correa has denied all wrongdoing, and has called the charges against him politically motivated attempts to discredit his movement.

== Early life ==
=== Early life ===
Correa's father was Rafael Correa Icaza, born in Los Ríos Province, Ecuador, while his mother is Norma Delgado Rendón (born 1 September 1939). He had three siblings; Fabricio Correa, Pierina Correa and Bernardita Correa. Having grown up in the coastal city of Guayaquil, he has described his family background as being that of the "lower middle class".

When Correa was five, his father was arrested and imprisoned for three years after attempting to smuggle illegal narcotics into the United States. Publicly acknowledging this incident while president, Correa stated that "I do not condone what he did [but] drug smugglers are not criminals. They are single mothers or unemployed people who are desperate to feed their families". Correa was 18 when he was told about his father's actions.

While living in Guayaquil, Correa was highly involved in the Boy Scout program. When he was 17, despite his family facing financial hardship, a family friend paid for him to be educated at an elite local school, where he excelled. During his secondary studies he was president of the Lasallian Student Cultural Association ("ACEL" in Spanish). Correa then obtained a scholarship to study at the Universidad Católica de Santiago de Guayaquil (UCSG), a private higher education institution in Guayaquil, Ecuador, where he obtained an undergraduate degree in economics in 1987.

When attending UCSG, he was elected President of the Association of Students of Economy, Audit and Administration (AEAA) and, later on, President of the Federation of Students (FEUC) of the same education center, a position which in 1986 allowed him to preside over the Private Universities Students Federation of Ecuador (FEUPE).

=== University ===
Following the conclusion of his studies at UCSG, Correa worked for a year in a mission at a kindergarten run by the Salesian order in Zumbahua, Cotopaxi Province, where he taught Catholicism and mathematics. It was here that he furthered his faith in Catholicism, and developed a working understanding of the Quechua language spoken by most of Ecuador's indigenous people. He then secured a scholarship to study economics further at UCLouvain in Belgium, where he met Anne Malherbe Gosselin, whom he married and has three children with. He later received a Master of Arts in Economics from UCLouvain in June 1991.

Correa was able to afford a university education with the aid of funding grants. He continued his studies at the University of Illinois at Urbana-Champaign, where he earned a Master of Science in economics in May 1999, and a PhD in economics in October 2001.

Returning to Ecuador, Correa secured a position at the University of San Francisco in Quito, where he taught economics. At the same time, he worked as an economic adviser to state and international agencies. During this period, Ecuador experienced a banking crisis and the government of President Jamil Mahuad replaced the Ecuadorean sucre currency with the U.S. dollar. Correa was highly critical of this dollarisation policy, arguing against it in various academic publications that he produced at the time.

== Politics ==
Between 1992 and 1993, during the presidency of Sixto Durán Ballén, Correa was a director at the Ministry of Education and Culture (MEC) in Ecuador, tasked with administrative oversight and supervision of improvement programs for the national educational system. The improvement programs were funded by the Inter-American Development Bank (IDB).

=== Minister of Finance ===
On 20 April 2005, Correa was appointed to the position of Minister of Economy and Finance in the government of President Alfredo Palacio, having previously advised Palacio before his ascension to the presidency. As finance minister, Correa met with a number of Latin American presidents, including Brazil's Luiz Inácio Lula da Silva, Argentina's Nestor Kirchner, and Venezuela's Hugo Chávez. He established himself as both a political maverick and a staunch critic of economic liberalization.

During his four months in charge of the portfolio, Correa was skeptical of signing a free trade agreement with the United States and declining advice from the International Monetary Fund, instead working to increase Ecuador's cooperation with other Latin American countries. Arguably his most notable decision within the Ministry of Finance was to reverse the fact that surpluses from oil sales go directly to prepay Ecuador's foreign debt and instead go to investment in health and education. After the World Bank stopped a loan, citing changes in the oil revenue stabilization fund, Correa resigned from Palacio's government. He had also proposed the issuance of government bonds at a lower interest rate than the 8.5% prevailing one at that time. Venezuela's government was buying half of the new bond issue. Correa claimed in his resignation letter that the sale was done with full presidential authorization, but cited lack of support from the president as a factor in his decision to resign. When Correa resigned as minister, polls showed he had the highest credibility of any official in the administration at the time, with 57% of Ecuadorians saying that they trusted him.

Prior to becoming President, Correa denounced the "sophistry of Free Trade", in an introduction he wrote for a book titled The Hidden Face of Free Trade Agreements. One of the authors of that book is his ex-Minister and congressman Alberto Acosta. Citing as his source the book, Kicking Away the Ladder, written by Korean economist based at Cambridge University and Center for Economic and Policy Research analyst Ha-Joon Chang, Correa identified the difference between an "American system" opposed to "a British System" of free trade. The latter, he says, was explicitly viewed by the Americans as "part of the British imperialist system". Correa wrote that Chang showed that it was Treasury Secretary Alexander Hamilton, and not Friedrich List who was the first to present a systematic argument defending industrial protectionism. (Correa includes List's National System of Political Economy in his bibliographic references.)

=== 2006 presidential campaign ===
Correa decided to campaign for the presidency in the 2006 presidential election, although at the time he was a largely unknown figure among the Ecuadorean public. Employing Vinicio Alvarado as his campaign manager, Correa's campaign emphasised his personality as a macho family man of modest origins who was angry with the country's political elites. During his campaign, he described himself as the head of "a citizen's revolution" against the established political parties and corrupt elites, and depicted himself as the leader of a second independence movement devoted to freeing Ecuador from American imperialism. Touring the country aboard a motorized caravan attending political rallies, he emphasized this opposition using campaign songs such as Twisted Sister's "We're Not Gonna Take It", as well as through the slogan "Se viene el correazo" ("Here comes a whipping"), a pun on the fact that "Correa" can be translated as whip.

Correa established a political vehicle, the PAIS Alliance (Alianza PAIS—Patria Altiva y Soberana, "Proud and Sovereign Fatherland Alliance"), which united a disparate group of leftist organizations. However, in an unusual move he announced that the PAIS Alliance would not put forward any congressional candidates during the election, thus reflecting his opposition to the established political system. During the campaign, Correa stated that if elected he would use an executive decree to introduce a national referendum on the establishment of a constituent assembly which had the potential to rewrite Ecuador's constitution. He presented this as a process necessary to overthrow the established political elites, whom he termed the partidocracia ("partyarchy") and redistribute political power.

The Alianza PAIS movement signed a political alliance with the Ecuadorian Socialist Party, which did present candidates for Congress. On 31 July 2006, Alianza PAIS also signed a Programmatic Political Agreement with the Communist Party of Ecuador when Correa was postulated for candidate for president. Other parties that joined Alianza PAIS coalition in a runoff election included Democratic People's Movement, Democratic Left, Pachakutik, and the Partido Roldista Ecuatoriano.

During his campaign, Correa traveled to Barinas, Venezuela to spend time at Hugo Chávez's family home, describing the Venezuelan President as a personal friend.

On economic policy, Correa called for reform of the petroleum industry, including an increase in the percentage of petroleum revenues spent on social programs for the Ecuadorian poor, following the reforms of the Hydrocarbons Law promoted by former Economy and Finance Minister Diego Borja. He accused foreign petroleum companies operating in Ecuador of failing to meet existing environmental and investment regulations.

In an interview, Correa stated:

Many of the oil contracts are a true entrapment for the country. Of every five barrels of oil that the multinationals produce, they leave only one for the state and take four... That is absolutely unacceptable. We're going to revise and renegotiate the contracts.

Correa also proposed strategies for reducing the burden of Ecuador's foreign debt service through compulsory debt restructuring. He indicated that his top priority would be spending on social programs rather than servicing Ecuador's debt. On foreign policy, Correa stressed Ecuador's aversion to becoming involved in Colombia's domestic conflict. In October 2006, Correa added that he would "pursue and capture" FARC members if they entered Ecuador. He also condemned their kidnappings, violations of human rights and bombings. In addition to his platform on economic and social policy, Correa's ability to communicate with a large majority of Ecuador's indigenous population in their own language also differentiated him from other candidates. He learned Quichua in his youth during a year he spent volunteering in a remote highland town.

In the October 2006 general election, Correa obtained second place (23%) behind banana tycoon Álvaro Noboa (27%). The situation led to a run-off election, in which Correa portrayed Noboa as an exploitative oligarch and Noboa portrayed Correa as a dangerous leftist with strong links to Venezuela. Correa won the subsequent November 2006 runoff election with 57% of the vote.

== Presidency (2007–2017) ==
=== First term: 2007–2009 ===
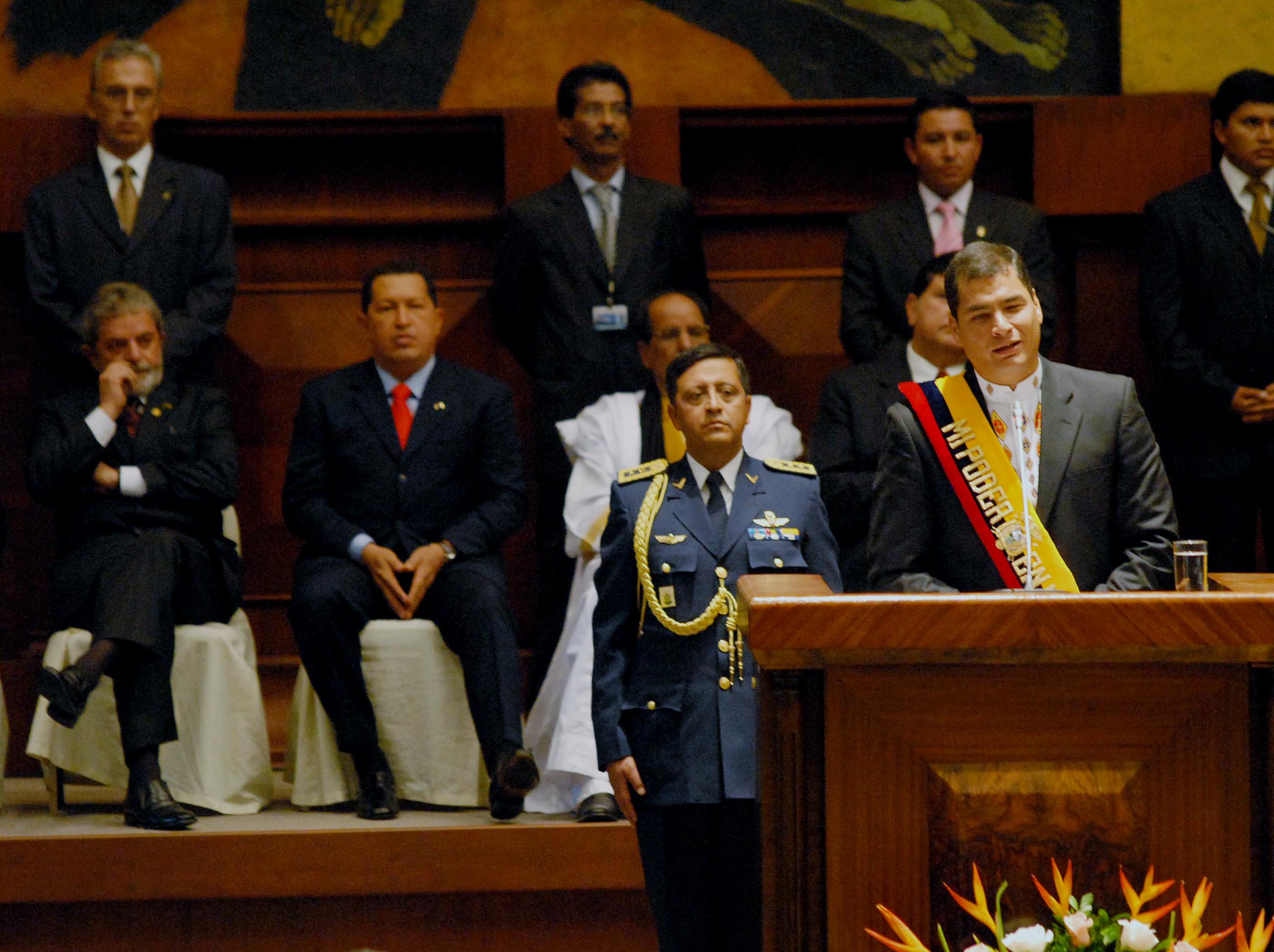
Rafael Correa during his inaugural speech as president of Ecuador

Rafael Correa was officially declared President on 4 December 2006 by the electoral court. He was sworn in on 15 January 2007 as the 45th president of Ecuador, the seventh to occupy the post since the legislature removed President Abdalá Bucaram 10 years earlier in the midst of a debt crisis that had devastated the country. His inauguration was attended by most regional leaders, as well as the Iranian president and the Spanish Crown Prince. Declaring that "Ecuador had voted for itself", Correa proclaimed that his election meant an end to neoliberalism in the country. Invoking the name of African-American civil rights activist Martin Luther King Jr., Correa also spoke out against racial discrimination against indigenous and Afro-Ecuadorians in his speech. During the ceremony he wore a shirt decorated with motifs from the prehistoric Jama Coaque culture.

During his first months in office, Correa's government doubled the monthly poverty assistance payments to $30, doubled the credits for housing loans and reduced the electricity rates for individuals on low incomes.

Correa ordered a plebiscite on the issue of whether or not Ecuador should establish a new constitution in April 2007; the proposal passed with over 80% of the vote. Elections to establish a Constituent Assembly were held in 2007 and were won by Correa's government with over 60% of the vote. The new constitution also increased the powers of the presidency by increasing the number of presidential decrees permitted.

==== Economic policy ====
Socialism will continue. The Ecuadorian people voted for that. We are going to emphasize this fight for social justice, for regional justice. We are going to continue the fight to eliminate all forms of workplace exploitation within our socialist conviction: the supremacy of human work over capital. Nobody is in any doubt that our preferential option is for the poorest people, we are here because of them. Hasta la victoria siempre! (Until victory, for ever!)

— Rafael Correa, 30 April 2009

Correa adopted a confrontational approach to both the International Monetary Fund and the World Bank. Correa's administration stated that the new government would not sign an agreement which allowed the International Monetary Fund to monitor its economic plan. In February 2007, Correa's economy minister Ricardo Patiño stated: "I have no intention … of accepting what some governments in the past have accepted: that (the IMF) tell us what to do on economic policy ... That seems unacceptable to us". However, as a member of the IMF, the annual report known as the "Article IV" report will be submitted. In April 2007, Ecuador paid off its debt to the IMF. Correa said Ecuador wanted no further relationship with the fund. During his first year in office, Correa spoke of building an alternative to capitalist development, stating "we are building a conception of development that is different from that of the capitalist system, where we seek not to live better, to have competition, to have more every day, but to live well, to satisfy basic needs, where harmony with nature is sought, where we seek the indescribable life of cultures." This was reflected in an ideological manifesto of Correa's PAIS Alliance and various development plans, which promoted as an alternative to capitalism Buen Vivir (Good Living). He declared Ecuador's national debt illegitimate and announced that the country would default on over $3 billion worth of bonds; he pledged to fight creditors in international courts and succeeded in reducing the price of outstanding bonds by more than 60%.

In May 2007, evidence surfaced that some of the Ecuadorian government rhetoric might have been part of an alleged market manipulation to benefit Ecuador from movements in the price of financial instruments linked to Ecuadorian bonds. A fall in Ecuador bond prices, ignited by aggressive default rhetoric, would trigger a buyback by Ecuador, financed by Venezuelan banks. This strategy collapsed due to operations by Venezuelan financial institutions who profited from the market swings. Correa referred to the allegations as a conspiracy from a powerful banker. On 26 July 2007, Rafael Correa replaced finance minister Patiño, due to Patiño's appearance in a video recording, apparently discussing the market manipulation. Patiño then assumed a newly created position responsible for the Pacific coast region and later assumed the Political Affairs Ministry. In a radio address on 13 December, Correa said that he wanted to force a "big discount" on creditors, whom a day earlier he called "true monsters who won't hesitate to crush the country". "I have lost sleep over this … this will cost us tears and sweat but I think we are doing the right thing." Correa, who endorses anti-debt NGO Jubilee 2000's slogan "life before debt", is popular among Ecuadorians for his stance against foreign investors.

Correa has criticized the neoliberal policies of previous presidents, particularly former president Mahuad's adoption of the U.S. dollar as Ecuador's domestic currency in 2000 to combat the country's inflation. Correa has characterized American dollarisation as a "technical error" which has effectively eliminated Ecuador's ability to set its own currency and exchange policy. However, Correa has also acknowledged that it would be politically and economically impossible to abandon that policy now. After his election victory of 15 April 2007, he pledged to maintain dollarisation during the entire four years of his administration, though he also indicated his support for the idea of replacing the US dollar with a regional South American currency at some point in the future.

On 16 April 2009, Finance Minister María Elsa Viteri embarked on a trip to Europe in a mission to present Ecuador's offer to buy back global bonds 2012 and 2030 at 30% of their current value. In May 2009, Ecuador announced that it had successfully bought 91% of the bonds at a cost of 35 cents on the dollar.

In May 2008, the Ecuadorian government renegotiated radio spectrum franchises for mobile phone operators Porta and Movistar for a total price of 700 million dollars, far more than that recommended by studies conducted under previous governments, which had proposed granting the same franchises for only 70 million dollars.

==== Foreign policy ====
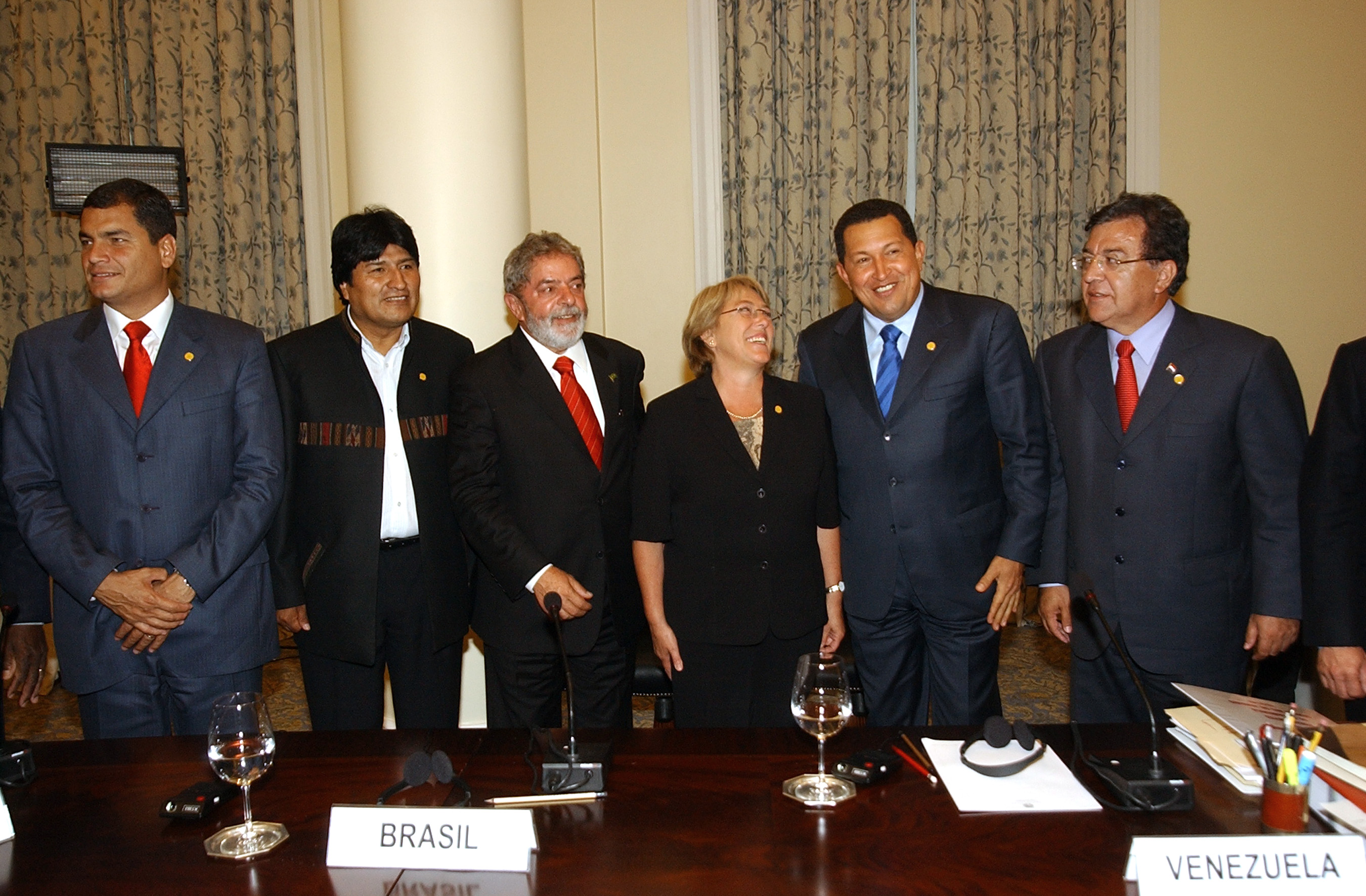
Presidents of South American countries meet in Rio de Janeiro. From left to right: Rafael Correa (Ecuador), Evo Morales (Bolivia), Luiz Inácio Lula da Silva (Brazil), Michelle Bachelet (Chile), Hugo Chávez (Venezuela) and Nicanor Duarte (Paraguay)

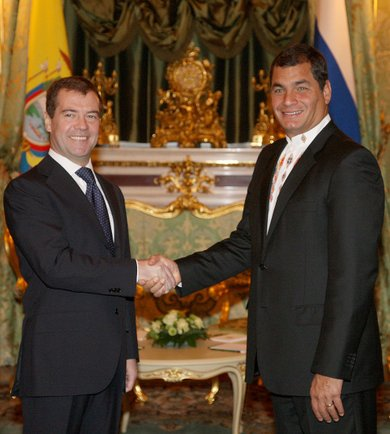
Correa and Russian President Dmitry Medvedev in Moscow, 29 October 2009

During Rafael Correa's tenure as president, he took some radical alternative steps to change the course of Ecuador's relations with the rest of the world. Amongst these were economic moves to correct Ecuador's debt imbalance, distancing from the United States, a rift with its northern neighbor Colombia, and a strengthening of ties with ALBA (including Venezuela and Bolivia), as well as Iran.

Correa adopted a confrontational approach to the governments of both the United States and neighboring Colombia. At the time of his election, Ecuador contained Manta Air Base, the only U.S. military base in South America. Correa refused to renew the base's lease when it expired in 2009 and the constitution was changed to ban foreign military bases being established in Ecuador.

On 1 March 2008 at 00:25 local time (05:25 UTC), Colombia launched a military operation, 1.8 kilometers (1.1 mi) into Ecuador. According to Colombian authorities, the guerrillas responded militarily to this initial bombardment from a position in the vicinity of Santa Rosa de Yanamaru, on the Ecuadorian side of the border, killing a Colombian soldier, Carlos Hernández. A second bombardment was then carried out, resulting in the deaths of Raúl Reyes and at least 20 more FARC members. Two bodies, several documents and three laptops found in the guerrilla camp were returned to Colombia. This was the first time the Colombian military had killed a member of FARC's leadership council in combat. After this operation, Colombia increased its security measures nationwide, fearing FARC retaliation.

According to the Ecuadorian government, the attack happened 3 kilometres (1.9 mi) inside its own territory, lacked its permission and was a planned strike, intended to be followed by the incursion of Colombian troops by helicopter. It pointed out that the attack had left a total of more than 20 people dead in Ecuadorian territory, many of whom were found to be wearing underwear or sleeping clothes. The government of Ecuador concluded that the attack was a "massacre" and not the result of combat or "hot pursuit". Ecuadorian president Rafael Correa had reason to believe that the Colombian warplanes had penetrated 10 km into Ecuador's territory and struck the guerrilla camp while flying north, followed by troops in helicopters who had completed the killings. He claimed that some of the bodies had been found to be shot from behind.

The Ecuadorian authorities found three wounded women in the camp, including a Mexican student who was identified as Lucía Andrea Morett Álvarez. Lucía Morett claimed that she was visiting the guerrilla group as part of an academic investigation, refusing to answer other questions about the circumstances surrounding her presence there. Regarding the attack on the camp, she has stated: "I was asleep when we received a first aerial attack. Two or three hours later we were attacked again". Ecuador said that it was cooperating with Mexico to investigate whether any Mexicans had been killed during the raid. According to the director of the Ecuadorian military hospital which treated the three women, they had received some sort of medical attention from both the attacking Colombian forces and the Ecuadorian soldiers who later found them.

President Uribe of Colombia spoke by telephone with his Ecuadorian counterpart, Rafael Correa, early on the morning of the raid, to inform him of the incident. In a press conference that evening, Correa denounced the attack as "aggression" against Ecuador, calling it a "massacre", and claiming that the rebels had been killed in their sleep using "advanced technology". He announced that he was summoning his ambassador in Colombia for consultations. On Sunday, 2 March, Correa said that a diplomatic note would be sent in protest at the incursion, claiming that the action had been a violation of Ecuador's airspace. Ecuador formally recalled its ambassador from Colombia and expelled the Colombian ambassador from Quito.

Correa withdrew his government's ambassador in Bogotá, Colombia, and ordered troops to the country's border following the 2008 Andean diplomatic crisis in early March 2008. On 3 March 2008, Colombia's police said that documents found in a camp in Ecuador where Colombian troops killed Raul Reyes, a top guerrilla boss, showed ties between the FARC rebels and Correa, including contacts about political proposals and local military commanders. Correa denied the accusations, calling them lies. Correa also said that a deal to release political prisoners – including former Colombian Sen. Ingrid Betancourt – was nearly complete before the 1 March 2008 Colombian raid into his country. On 5 March 2008, Correa and Venezuelan president Hugo Chávez met to discuss Colombia's attack and made a series of accusations against Colombia's government. During the meeting, Correa dismissed Colombia's president Álvaro Uribe as just a "puppet" while others are the "puppet masters". On 18 May 2011, Colombia's Supreme Court ruled documents found on computers of slain FARC commander "Raul Reyes" are inadmissible as evidence in court as the material is illegally obtained and provides no evidence.

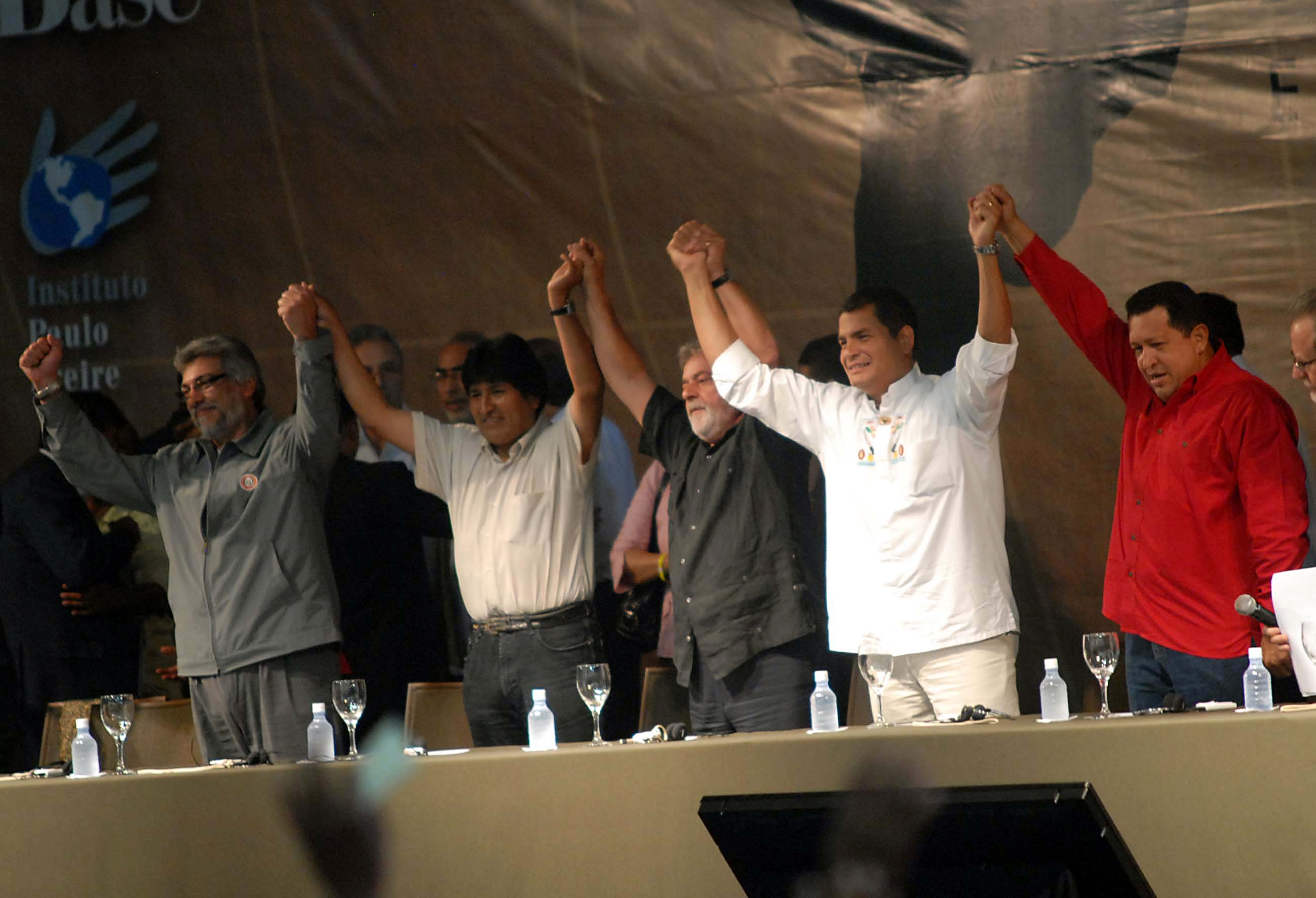
Presidents Fernando Lugo of Paraguay, Evo Morales of Bolívia, Luiz Inácio Lula da Silva of Brasil, Rafael Correa of Ecuador, and Hugo Chávez of Venezuela, in Fórum Social Mundial for Latin America

==== 2008 Constitution ====
===== Relations with Congress and Legislative crisis =====
In February 2007, Correa's plan to have a referendum on the convening of a constituent assembly was approved by Congress. The referendum took place on 15 April 2007. However, after this date was set, the "statutes" for the referendum were modified by Correa to allow more powers to the constituent assembly. One of these powers was the ability to dismiss Congress, a power which Congress never approved. The newer version of the referendum was approved by the majority of the seven-seat Electoral Tribunal. In early March, Congress, which was controlled by Correa's opposition, reacted by trying to impeach the President of the electoral tribunal. The electoral tribunal then removed from office the 57 members of Congress who tried to impeach the President of the Electoral Tribunal, on the grounds of attempting to intervene an electoral process. Correa backed the electoral tribunal (which approved his version of the referendum) while stating that the removal of the 57 congressmen was constitutional. The situation escalated to a feud between the opposition in Congress and the Executive and marches in the street against Congress and police intervention to prevent the Congressmen from entering the legislative building.

On 22 March 21 alternate deputies were sworn in, allowing the Congress to regain quorum, and on 23 and 24 March a further 20 deputies were sworn in. The new majority (formed by 28 alternate deputies and 31 deputies from parties that support the referendum and Assembly) pledged to support the referendum on the Constitutional Assembly.

On 23 April, the Constitutional Court decided to try to reinstate 51 of the 57 Congressmen who had been fired by the Electoral Tribunal. The Constitutional Court claimed that it was illegal to remove them in the first place and approved a petition by the 51 requesting their reinstatement. But before the congressmen had the chance to reenter Congress, Congress voted to fire all nine judges of the Constitutional Court for their "unconstitutional actions".

On 15 April 2007, Ecuadorians voted overwhelmingly (81.72% in favor) to support the election of a constituent assembly. On 30 September 2007, due to the extraordinarily large number of candidates and lists (26 national lists, 428 provincial lists, 44 emigrant lists) the 2007 Ecuadorian Constituent Assembly election was the most complex in Ecuador's history. As a result, in the national election, President Correa won backing for his plans to rewrite Ecuador's constitution and expand state control of the nation's economy. Correa's faction won approximately 61% of the seats in the National Assembly (80 of 130 Assembly Members).

==== Constituent Assembly ====
The Ecuadorian Constituent Assembly first convened on 29 November 2007 in Montecristi and was given six months to write a new constitution, with a possible two-month extension. When Ecuador began the process of writing a new constitution, they received help from the Community Environmental Legal Defense Fund to draft environmental laws giving nature and ecosystems rights.

A constitutional referendum was held in Ecuador on 28 September 2008 to ratify or reject the constitution drafted by the Ecuadorian Constituent Assembly elected in 2007. Partial results show that 64% of voters voted to approve the 2008 Constitution of Ecuador.

==== Environmental conservation ====
The President affirmed that his was a "green" Government for its defense of the environment." In line with this, he had decided to return to the International Whaling Commission to impede the restart of the hunt of whales; established a prohibition on the extraction of prized types of wood; and announced that for an annual compensation of 350 million dollars from the international community it would give up the exploitation of an oil field of around 1 billion barrels, one of their biggest reserves of petroleum located in a reservation of the Yasuní National Park biosphere in the Amazon Basin. The proposal hoped to collect contributions starting from 2010.

===== Oil politics =====
In 2013 Ecuador announced that it would auction more than three million hectares of Amazonian rainforest in the Yasuni Nature Reserve to Chinese oil companies. The indigenous people inhabiting the land protested the deal. They claim that the oil projects would threaten their traditional way of life and devastate the area's environment. Ecuador's Shuar people's women's leader, Narcisa Mashienta, said that the government lied when claiming that the people would have given their consent.

The NGO Amazon Watch claims that the reason for the projects is the government's 7-billion-dollar debt to China and the desire to get Chinese funding to build a 12.5 billion dollar oil refinery.

An 11,000-barrel oil spill in the Amazon was considered problematic to Correa's desire to win a third term, because he had tried to assure his critics of him being environment-friendly.

===== Yasuní-ITT Initiative =====
The Yasuní-ITT Initiative is aimed at ceasing crude oil extraction in the Ishpingo-Tiputini-Tambococha (ITT) oil fields, which are located in the highly vulnerable area of Yasuní National Park. The proposal would contribute to preserving biodiversity, reducing carbon dioxide emissions, and respecting the rights of indigenous peoples and their way of life.

President Correa has stated that Ecuador's first option is to maintain the crude oil in the subsoil. The national and international communities would be called on to help the government implement this costly decision for the country. The government hopes to recover 50% of the revenues it would obtain by extracting the oil. The procedure involves the issuing of government bonds for the crude oil that will remain "in situ", with the double commitment of never extracting this oil and of protecting Yasuní National Park. The hoped for-amount is estimated at 350 million dollars annually.

A more promising alternative would be a strategy to provide the government with the 50% of resources in such a way as to provide a consistent income for an indefinite period of time. This resource would be channeled towards activities that help to free the country from its dependency on exports and imports and to consolidate food sovereignty.

In August 2013, Correa abandoned the initiative and approved oil drilling, blaming lack of support from the international community for the decision.

===== Sea conservation =====
Correa overturned a ban on the sale of shark fins, which are popular in Asia, but stipulated that the fins can only be sold if the sharks are caught accidentally and by artisan fishermen. He did not say how authorities would determine whether the shark had been caught accidentally or deliberately.

On 3 August 2007, Correa ordered the deportation of Sean O'Hearn-Gimenez, director of the Sea Shepherd Conservation Society, saying that he would not allow "gringuitos" (literally, "little gringos") to tell Ecuadorians what to do or to pursue local fishermen. However, a local newspaper noted that O'Hearn-Gimenez had signed a 5-year agreement with Ecuador's own Environmental Police rather than acting unilaterally (as a foreigner with no authority of his own), and was married to an Ecuadorian. The deportation was ordered because Sea Shepherd, in partnership with the Ecuadorian National Environmental Police, exposed and stopped the biggest shark-fin shipment in the port city of Manta. Correa later rescinded the extradition order because O'Hearn-Gimenez was married to an Ecuadorian woman. All the arrested fishermen were released, too, and the confiscated shark fins returned to them.

==== Police and security ====
The homicide rate per 100,000 inhabitants fell from 18 in 2011 to 5.8 in 2017, making Ecuador one of the safest countries in the Americas. This was achieved in part after a thorough reform of the police force, which was known for its corruption and inefficiency. The length of police training and their salaries have been significantly increased, and investments have been made to modernize equipment. In addition, since 2007, a new approach has been adopted that is less repressive and gives greater attention to prevention and reintegration. Access to social programs has been facilitated for ex-offenders. Above all, the reduction of poverty seems to be the main reason for the improvement of the security situatio.

==== People with disabilities ====
According to The Guardian, Ecuador has become one of the "most progressive nations in Latin America when it comes to providing financial, technical and professional assistance to people with disabilities". State spending on related fields has increased from $2m a year to $150m. Tests are carried out on newborns to ensure care is provided early, and all leading employers in Ecuador must earmark at least 4% of their jobs for disabled people. There are also programmes to provide braille texts and computers for visually impaired people.

=== Second presidential term: 2009–2013 ===
Rafael Correa was re-elected for a second term in the April 2009 general election, where he gained 52% of the vote. He was the first Ecuadorian President to serve a second consecutive term since the 19th century. It was the first time in thirty years that the country had re-elected a president and the first elected president from Guayaquil (The coast) who had finished his term after Leon Febres Cordero (1984–1986). He won by a large margin over the other seven candidates, taking 52 per cent of the vote to the 28 per cent of Lucio Gutiérrez, his nearest rival. His party also won the largest legislative block in the National Assembly, although not a majority.

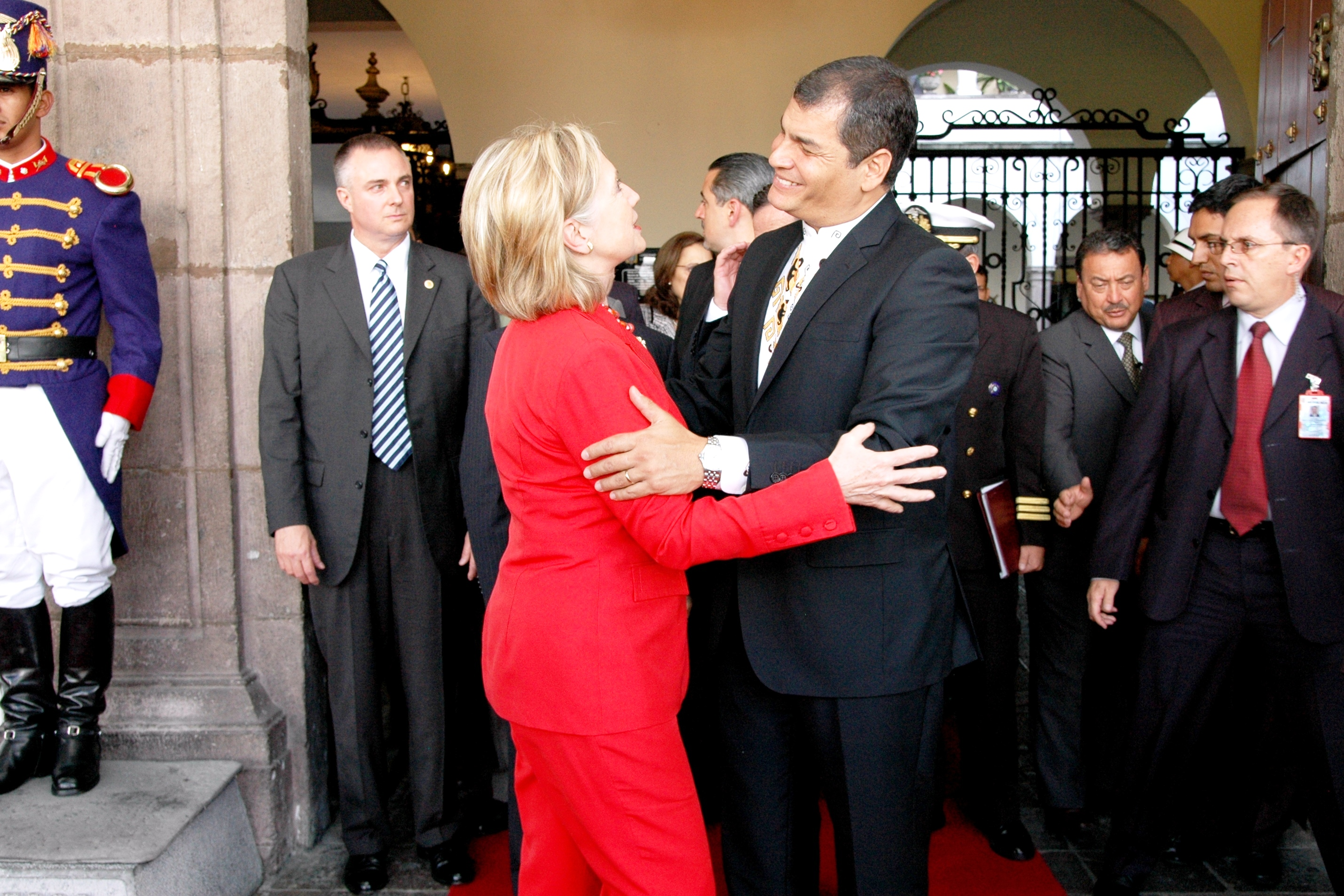
Correa and U.S. Secretary of State Hillary Clinton in Quito, 8 June 2010

Correa was sworn into the Presidency on 10 August 2009, the same day as Ecuador's bicentennial. His speech took place in front of several Latin American dignitaries, such as the president of Argentina Cristina Fernández de Kirchner, Bolivian President Evo Morales, Cuban President Raúl Castro, and Venezuelan President Hugo Chávez. Correa used the opportunity to promise a continuation of his "socialist revolution", his plans to end poverty and to go on "stamping out the structural causes of poverty". He also said the actions of the media were opposing his government. He claims that the continuation of his "The Citizens' Revolution" policy is intended to ensure all citizens are equal.

==== Health ====
The health budget was $561 million in 2006 and was increased to $1.774 billion in 2012, which is 6.8% of the national budget. The Ecuadorian government signed an agreement with the Cuban government to allow public company Enfarma to massively produce medicine at low cost. Working hours for doctors were increased to 40 hours/week and their salaries were also increased. Mobile hospitals have been implemented. Another program has been implemented to increase the rate of return of medics amongst Ecuadorian emigrants.

Infant mortality, from 24.4 per 1000 in 2005, declined to 18.3 in 2015. Between 2008 and 2016, new public hospitals have been built, the number of civil servants has increased significantly, and salaries have been increased. In 2008, the government introduced universal and compulsory social security coverage. In 2015, corruption remains a problem. Overbilling is recorded in 20% of public establishments and in 80% of private establishments.

==== Closure of Teleamazonas ====
In June 2009, CONARTEL (a radio and television regulating body) imposed fines on a television station, Teleamazonas. A third fine could lead to a temporary or permanent ban on this private television channel. In December 2009, the station was taken off the air by the Superintendent of Telecommunications [es], under a provisional suspension of 72 hours for purportedly "spreading false information."

==== 2009 Ecuador electricity crisis ====
Beginning 5 November, rolling blackouts took place across Ecuador for two to six hours per day. Government officials also urged citizens to conserve energy. Economic losses from the blackouts are estimated to be in the tens of millions of dollars; factory output slowed, and storage of perishables was disrupted.

On 6 November, the government declared an emergency in the power sector, which was expected to "allow the Finance Ministry to seek to guarantee fuel imports for thermoelectric plants". The government also agreed to purchase an additional "5,200 MW per hour [sic] of electricity from Peru and Colombia". Government officials aimed to end power rationing before Christmas.

The power crisis led to criticism of the Correa administration's management of the power sector as water levels of the reservoirs became depleted.

==== Mining protests ====
In January, Ecuador experienced mass protests against large-scale mining. Indigenous people were demanding that they not be exploited at all and were blockading highways to make their point. Correa cited a constitutional article that prohibited the blocking of roads. Police officers were also injured in attempting to clear blockades. An opposition leader claimed to witness, "The response from the government was gunfire from the ground and the air," The leader said that police, backed by a helicopter, opened fire on the protesters unprovoked. In an interview with the state-run media on Thursday, Correa said that the police were not armed and had only riot gear to protect them from demonstrators who were wielding shotguns. The Shuar man that died was killed by protesters' own weapons, and police were also injured by the same shotgun pellets that killed the brother Shuar, Correa said.

==== Hydrocarbon production reforms ====
Correa announced that on 26 July 2010 Ecuador would enact reforms to a hydrocarbons law that aims to expropriate foreign-company operations unless they sign service contracts increasing state control of the industry. Correa reminded oil companies that if they did not abide by the state's policies, they would have their fields nationalized and would be forced from the country.

==== Higher Education Law ====
A debate to modify this and other reforms, especially the one which granted control of the Higher Education System by the government, was practically passed with consensus by the multi-partisan National Assembly on 4 August 2010 but vetoed by the president Rafael Correa, who wanted to keep the law strictly as it was originally redacted by his political party and SENPLADES (National Secretary of Planning and Development). Due to this change, there are many highly educated professionals and academicians under the old structure but estimated that only 87% of the faculty in public universities have already obtained a master's degree and fewer than 5% have PhD (although many of them have already Ecuadorian granted Doctorate degrees). To raise the number of Masters and PhDs the Government started a scholarship program to send Ecuadorians to study in the top ranking Universities around the world (around 8,500 scholarships until 2013) and around 820 more have been approved for 2014.

==== 2010 Ecuador crisis ====
On 30 September 2010, the National Police went on strike over the passage of a bill that would end the practice of giving medals and bonuses with each promotion. In what was called an attempted coup d'état, protests included road blockades, storming the National Assembly and state-run television station, and the military seizure of the Old Mariscal Sucre International Airport in Quito. President Correa went to debate with the rebellious police, but he was unsuccessful and instead challenged them to kill him, saying, "I'm not taking one step back. Gentlemen, if you want to kill the president, here he is, kill him if you have the guts." At this point none of the policemen dared to shoot him, so instead they decided to attack him and take him hostage. While held in the hospital inside the police headquarters, Correa declared a national state of emergency. That night, an elite army unit rescued him from the hospital amid violent clashes between the police and the army. The Army then took him to Carondelet Palace, where he announced he would not pardon those responsible. Throughout Ecuador, eight people were killed and 274 wounded in the unrest.

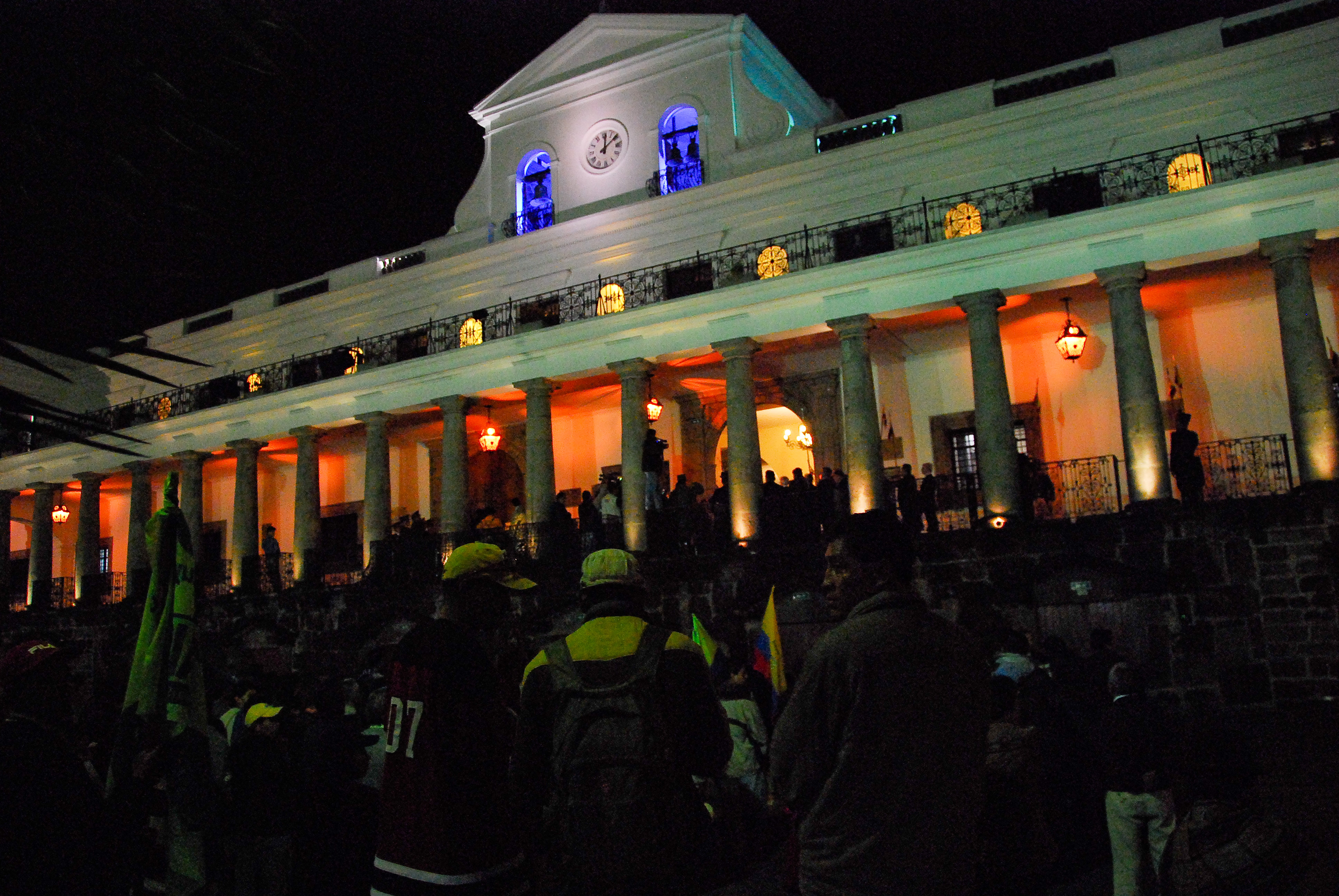
After the rescue, Correa immediately was presented in the Palacio of Carondelet in the night of 30 September.

On the same night, eight South American presidents attended an emergency summit of UNASUR convened that night in Buenos Aires to express their full support for Ecuadorean democratic institutions and Rafael Correa. The summit also announced a "democratic clause" to the UNASUR Constitutive Treaty and an agreement to take immediate and concrete steps if further similar attempts should occur.

The United States declared support for Correa through its ambassador to the Organization of American States. U.S. Secretary of State Hillary Clinton expressed "full support for President Rafael Correa, and the institutions of democratic government in that country." On 5 October, Ecuadorian foreign minister Ricardo Patiño said "I firmly believe that Mr. Obama had nothing to do with this. I hope, and trust that neither his (immediate subordinates) did.

==== President of UNASUR ====
Correa was a signatory to The UNASUR Constitutive Treaty of the Union of South American Nations on 15 July 2009. Ecuador has ratified the treaty. According to treaty, the UNASUR headquarters will be located in Ecuador.

On 10 August 2009 Correa hosted the Heads of Government of South America in Quito, as he took over the one-year Pro Tempore Presidency of UNASUR. Correa announced on 3 April 2010 that he would propose to UNASUR the creation of a united front against transnationals like the American Chevron, which he accused of attempting to destroy his country.

Correa also asked that UNASUR create a commission to investigate the events that led to the 30 Sep police revolt in Ecuador in which about a dozen people died and 270 were wounded. The uprising was led by police upset over a new law that would deny them promotion bonuses.

During Friday's summit, leaders also approved a democratic charter that would serve as a guide for the 12-nation bloc if any of them faced an attempted coup. The charter would have been an effective tool during Ecuador's revolt, Correa said. On 29 November 2010, UNASUR's presidency passed from Ecuador to Guyana.

In 2014, Correa opened the $65 million headquarters in Quito.

==== Lawsuit against the El Universo newspaper and Big Brother authors ====
Correa announced another lawsuit this time against an editorial writer and the directors of El Universo newspaper. The legal action included the opinion editor of the paper, Emilio Palacio, who was sued for defamation by a high-ranking public official last year. Correa alleged that several of Palacio's editorials were "accusations" and "slander", where Palacio stated "...ordered fire at will and without warning against a hospital full of civilians and innocent people..." In an official Universo editorial it was said that Correa committed crimes against humanity reasons, which Palacio was sued for. El Universo says the president's suit was announced several hours after the newspaper published an article about an information access request denial. While Palacio claimed, he was sued for calling Correa a "dictator".

"We are not only suing the editorial writer, but also the newspaper El Universo's directors", said Correa, in a radio interview on Ecuadorinmediato, quoted by El Universo. "Ecuador's autocrat cracks down on media freedom," was the title of an editorial published by The Washington Post on 27 July 2011:

Last week the president personally attended the trial while thuggish supporters threw eggs and bottles at the defendants outside the courthouse. To no one's surprise, the provisional judge hearing the case quickly ruled in the president's favor, sentencing Mr. Palacio and the three El Universo directors to three years in prison and awarding $40 million in damages to Mr. Correa – an amount that exceeds the total value of the newspaper.

As of 16 February 2012, the National Court of Justice (Ecuador's highest court) confirmed the lower court's award of $40 million in damages, as well as the three-year prison sentences against a journalist and three executives of the newspaper. The case related to unrest in September 2010, described by Correa as an attempted coup, which saw him trapped inside a hospital for several hours by police officers. In an opinion article from February 2011 which appeared in El Universo, Emilio Palacio alleged that the president had ordered soldiers to fire on the hospital, which was full of civilians.

Correa also filed a lawsuit against Juan Carlos Calderón and Christian Zurita, investigative journalists and authors of the book Gran Hermano (Big Brother). Rafael Correa insisted that if the authors of the book admitted wrongdoing and asked for forgiveness he would pardon them. The lawsuit is based on the book's accusation that Correa knew of his brother Fabricio Correa's multimillion-dollar contracts with the government, a journalistic "investigation" into contracts signed between the president's brother, Fabricio Correa, and the State. The authors claim was based on a testimony by Pablo Chambers, who based his accusation on a manipulated video of Correa during an interview with a radio station in Quito.

Following wide condemnation of the sentences in the El Universo case, Correa announced on 27 February 2012 that he would pardon the four individuals involved, also reminding that from the very beginning he asked for a rectification by the newspaper or an apology, both which the newspaper refused, instead claiming this was censorship, including asking Correa what he wanted them to publish. Despite the subsequent pardons, "the lawsuit had," according to Steven Levitsky and Daniel Ziblatt, "a powerful chilling effect on the press."

Correa also said he would drop his case against the authors of Gran Hermano.

Correa has been accused, in the words of the President of the Inter-American Press Association, of mounting a "systematic and hostile campaign to do away with the independent press and establish, by law or through the courts, ownership of the truth that all the Ecuadoran people must swallow." These complaints relate both to a series of lawsuits against journalists and to government takeovers of many media outlets.

The Washington Post reported in July 2011 that, according to a report for the National Endowment for Democracy, the government had controlled one radio station when Mr. Correa became president in 2007, but that by the time of the report it owned five television channels, four radio stations, two newspapers and four magazines.

==== Ecuadorian constitutional referendum, 2011 ====
Correa announced a constitutional referendum, which took place on 7 May 2011. The Ecuadorian people were asked to vote on ten questions, including a reform of the judiciary, although opposition members denounced what they called a "power grab" on behalf of Correa's government. Although an exit poll conducted by the Santiago Perez pollster showed that the 10 questions won with the 62% of the votes, as the count continued the "yes" lost presence even going as far as slightly losing to the "no" for a short period of time in questions 4 and 9. Correa pledged that the data had been manipulated by counting first the votes from the provinces where the "no" have won to create the "sensation of fraud" and he predicted that the "yes" will win with at least 250.000 votes on all 10 questions. At the end the "yes" won all 10 questions but only the first question got more than the 50% of the votes This was the eighth election to pass during Correa's term in office.

==== Chinese credits ====
In 2010 and 2011, Ecuador received Chinese credits for around US$5 billion. One of this financing model's projects is the hydroelectric Coca Codo Sinclair that China builds and it finances with something more than US$2 billion.

Correa pointed out that China gives credits to Ecuador at 7.0 percent, but the credits are to finance projects with 23 or 25 percent of profitability, that is extremely good business, when referring to two thousand million dollars which will be dedicated to public investment initiatives. The Chinese credits are a "good business" with interests of 7 percent to finance projects with a profitability that goes from 23 to 25 percent. Correa discarded the idea that Ecuador is delivered to or have mortgaged its petroleum to China.

On this point he mentioned that in the year 2006 75% of the Ecuadorian petroleum went to United States, in exchange for nothing. "Now we have 50% of the committed petroleum with China, in exchange for thousands of millions of dollars to finance the development of this country.

In 2012, China loaned Ecuador 240 million dollars for the purpose of overhauling the Ecuadorian security system. This system comprises 4,300 new surveillance cameras, drones, automated evidence processing systems, and increased manpower to manage each of these new technologies, which have been collectively dubbed the ECU 911 Integrated Security Service. Much of this new hardware has been developed in Ecuador, but in laboratories designed and set up by China National Electronics Import and Export Corporation (CEIEC), which is a state-owned company and a subsidiary of national defence contractor China Electronics Corporation (CEC). The CEC has also undertaken similar surveillance overhauls in Venezuela and Bolivia and has also introduced technology to monitor the Amazon Rainforest in Brazil. The Ecuadorian government has highlighted the benefits of this extensive security system, which has been installed across the nation's 24 provinces. They argue that it has been able to decrease the response time for everyday emergencies such as life-threatening illness, and have cited the system as a large factor in the dramatic drop in crime in Ecuador since its installation. Some individuals have expressed concern about the nature and the pervasiveness of these technologies, however, and how they may be used to create an Ecuadorian police state.

==== Restructuring of the justice ====
After the results of the popular consultation was created the Council of the Transitory Judicature integrated by three members Tania Aryans (delegate of the Legislative), Paulo Rodríguez (delegate of the Executive) and Fernando Yávar (delegate of the Function of Transparency). This advice has 18 months to restructure the Judicial Function Among its functions it was the one of creating the new National Court of Justice whose possession was given January 2012, 21 whose members will be in the positions for nine years. The court of justice was created through a competition of merits and opposition. Correa who participated of the act of possession of the new domestic magistrates, said that the administration of justice is an imperium of the state and at the same time, it is a public service, also it expressed his total back to the new judges of the National Court of Justice (CNJ)

In 2014, the law is amended to allow same-sex unions to benefit from legal recognition.

==== 2012 Ecuadorian protests ====
Ecuador's largest advocacy group for Indians, the Confederation of Indigenous Nationalities of Ecuador, planned a two-week march to Quito beginning on Thursday to protest Correa's land and water policies that they say were hurting their way of life. Correa condemned the action and accused them of being hypocrites for having allied with the extreme right, of seeking to exploit mining for themselves and of trying to destabilize his government, urging his followers to mobilize against them. The Indians were supported by the Popular Democratic Movement, a leftist party, the National Union of Educators and CONAIE, which supported Correa at the start of his administration in 2007 but soon moved to the opposition.

The support march on the Government concentrated on thousands of demonstrators coming from different zones that met in a park where they enjoyed artistic shows put on to celebrate the Woman's International Day. The march began in an Amazon region to the southeast and it arrived in Quito on 22 March. It had the support of the teachers' organizations and students.

Correa declared that the protests were intended to destabilize his government and he encouraged his followers "to keep mobilized until March 22"... "to resist peacefully. Those in favor of the Government also announced countermarches in various localities, such as in Cuenca where they had a concentration that gathered around fifteen thousand people.

==== Sex education and contraceptive services ====
Correa established the National Interagency Strategy for Family Planning and the Prevention of Teen Pregnancies (ENIPLA) in 2011. It had an annual budget of $2 million and focused on preventive doctor visits and family planning, including access to the morning-after pill. In the four years since ENIPLA was established pregnancies amongst girls between the ages of 11 and 14 decreased by 18 percent. At the end of 2014 Correa replaced ENIPLA with Plan Familia (a family-based abstinence only program). One study found that this shift led to an increase in teenage pregnancy in Ecuador.

==== CIA ====
Correa alleged that the United States attempted to meddle in the country's affairs during his presidency, saying that a representative from the American Central Intelligence Agency requested a meeting with him at the start of his administration and that the accounts of senior state officials had been hacked. Former British diplomat Craig Murray claimed that the CIA had tripled its budget to destabilise Rafael Correa's government during 2012.

=== Third presidential term: 2013–2017 ===
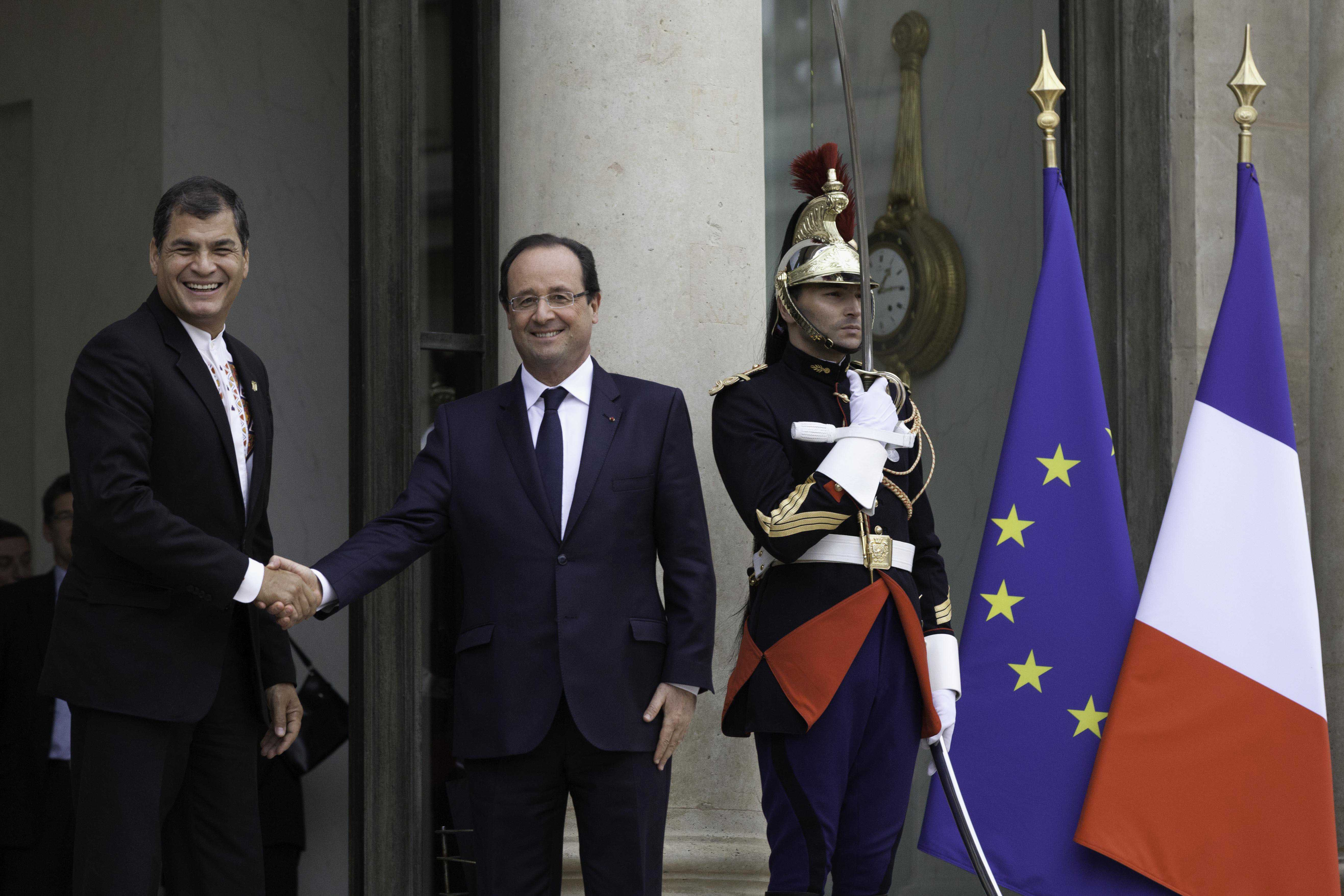
Correa and French President Francois Hollande, 7 November 2013

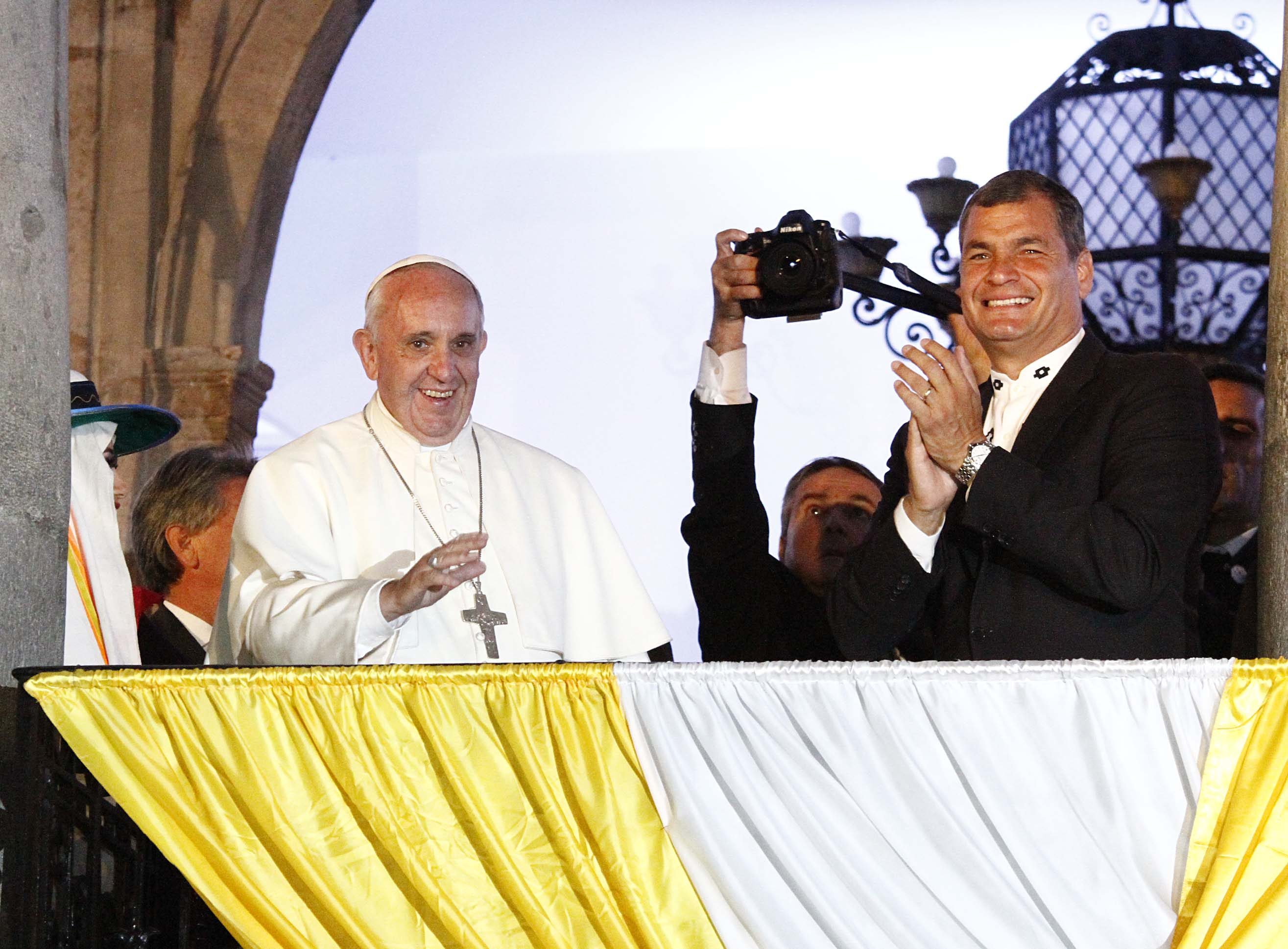
Rafael Correa with Pope Francis, 6 July 2015

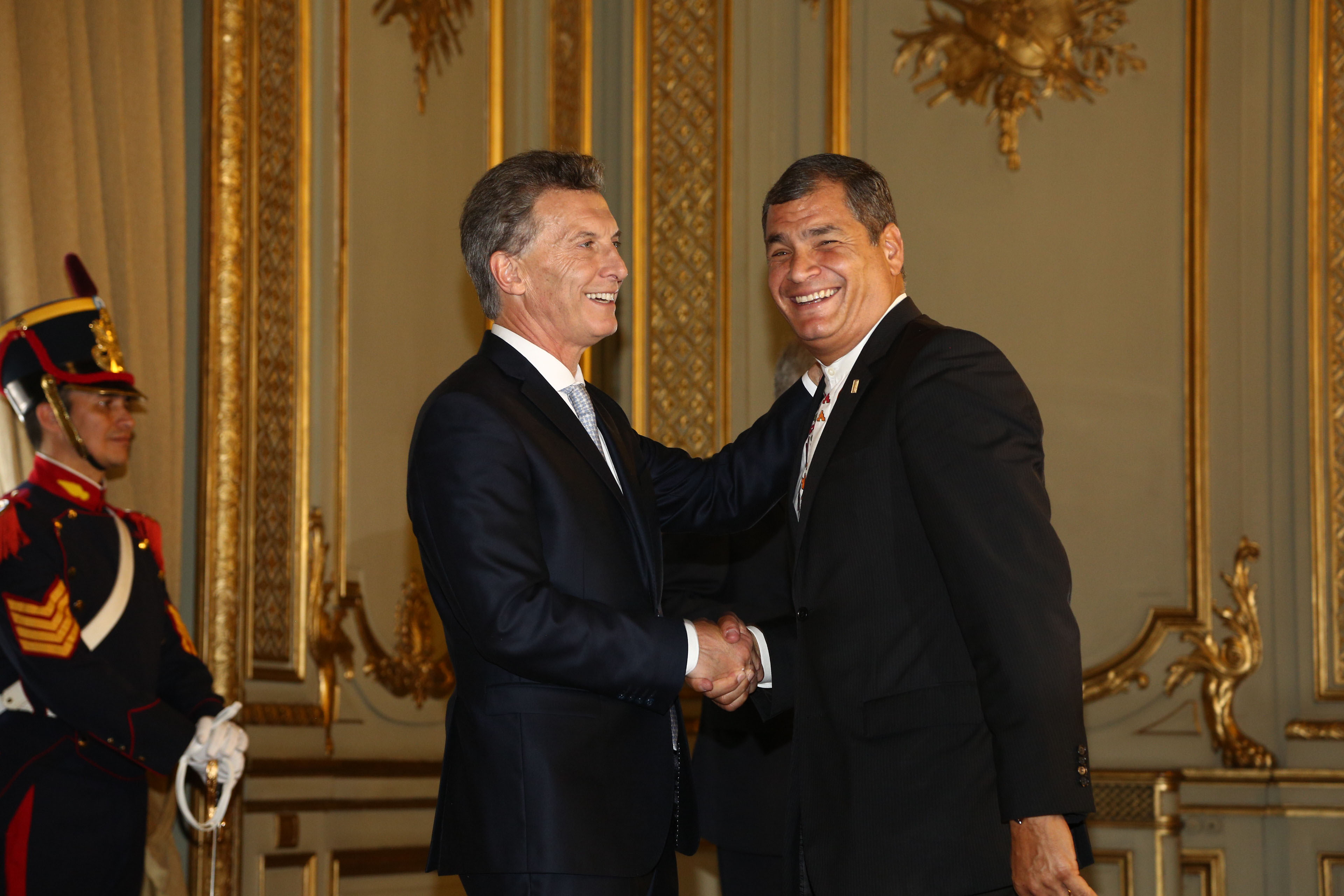
Correa and President of Argentina Mauricio Macri, 10 December 2015

General elections were held in Ecuador on 17 February 2013 to elect the President, the National Assembly, Provincial Assemblies and members of the Andean Parliament. Correa was reelected president, winning by a large margin in the first round of the presidential election. According to the quick count released by Participación Ciudadana, the Alianza PAIS movement (AP) reached two-thirds of the new National Assembly. The results gave the movement 100 of the 137 seats contested in the polls. Correa's closest electoral rival, Guillermo Lasso (with 11 of the 137 seats in the new National Assembly), conceded shortly after the election concluded.

The Ministry of Telecommunication and Information Society won the WSIS 2013 prize in category C5: Building confidence and security in the use of ICTs with the project Digital Training through Mobile Classrooms. In 2013, a comprehensive communication law was adopted, called Ley Orgánica de Comunicación.

==== Economy ====
Correa's government accepted a US$364 million loan from the IMF for earthquake reconstruction.

At the same time, inequalities, as measured by the Gini index, decreased from 0.55 to 0.47. Between 2006 and 2016, poverty decreased from 36.7% to 22.5%. Annual per capita GDP growth was 1.5 percent (as compared to 0.6 percent over the prior two decades).

==== Foreign policy ====
In November 2013, Correa's government said that the United States Agency for International Development was supporting the opposition and asked it to end its activities in Ecuador.

In April 2014, Correa's government ordered all US Defence Department employees working in the US embassy out of the country. Correa had previously stated that the US had too many military officers in Ecuador and that they had "infiltrated ... all sectors" of the country.

== Post-presidency ==
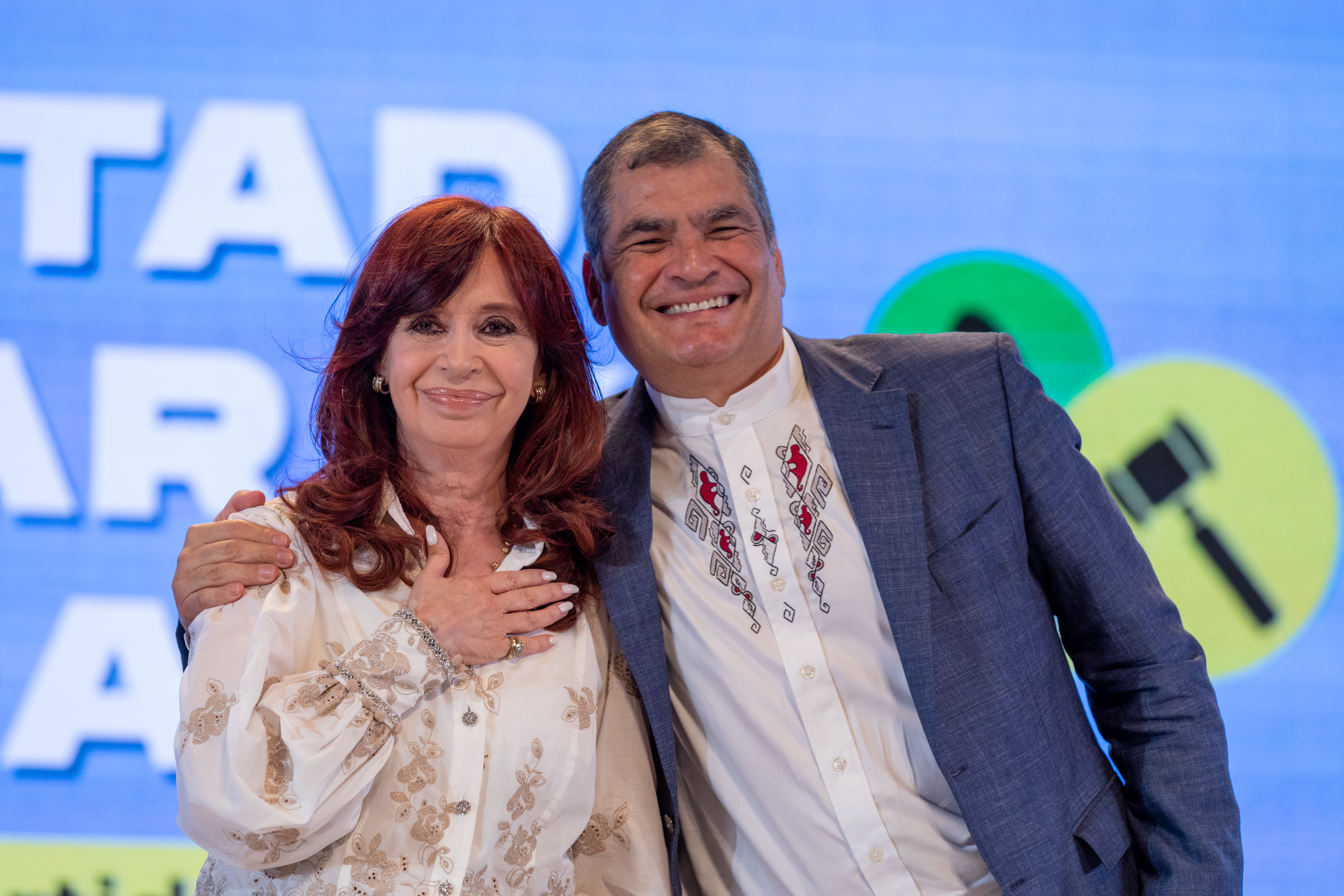
Correa with Cristina Kirchner in 2023

=== Self-imposed exile in Belgium ===
Since leaving office in 2017, Correa has lived in self-imposed exile in Belgium, his wife's native country. In April 2022, Belgium's Commissioner General for Refugees and Stateless Persons granted Correa asylum. Correa described himself and his family as "persecuted people." He was legally represented by Christophe Marchand.

=== Continuing influence in Ecuador ===
After finishing his term, Correa has remained politically influential in Ecuadorian politics. He frequently comments on social media; as of 2024, he had approximately one million followers on TikTok and four million on X (formerly Twitter). More than a decade after Correa left office, Ecuadorian politics has remained largely polarized between correísmo and anti-correísmo forces. although in a 2023 interview with El País, Correa said, "I have never liked the word Correismo." At the time of the 2023 muerte cruzada (the decision of Lasso to trigger early elections), the largest bloc of legislators in Ecuador's National Assembly were pro-Correa.

Correa's successor as president was Lenín Moreno, his protégé and former vice president, but the two men fell out within weeks of Moreno taking office, and Correa emerged as a critic of Moreno. Moreno moved closer to segments in Ecuador that had feuded with Correa, including business interests, the political right, and indigenous groups that had been marginalized under Correa. Correa was also angered by Moreno's decision, in April 2019, to withdraw the asylum granted by the Ecuadorian government to Julian Assange under Correa; Moreno invited Scotland Yard into the Ecuadorian embassy in London to arrest Assange, leading Correa to call Moreno a "traitor" and "a corrupt man" and the withdrawal of asylum, "one of the greatest betrayals in Latin American history."

During the Correa-Moreno feud caused a deep split within the ruling PAIS Alliance. Correa assailed the Moreno government's performance in the newspaper El Telégrafo. In the February 2018 Ecuadorian referendums, Moreno supported a measure to restate presidential term limits in Ecuador, thus blocking Correa from returning to the presidency. (Correa had suggested he might run in the 2021 election.) Correa led "No" campaign, returning to Ecuador from Belgium to campaign against the measure. The referendum passed by a two-to-one margin, thus reinstating term limits that had been dropped from the Ecuadorian constitution under Correa in 2015. Another referendum passed at the same time barred those convicted of corruption offenses from seeking office, a measure aimed at Correa's ally and former vice-president Jorge Glas, who was recently been found guilty of corruption.

Moreno was succeeded by Guillermo Lasso and Daniel Noboa, both Correa opponents and part of the country's political right. In 2023 election, Noboa led an anti-Correa coalition to defeat Correa ally Luisa González. In the 2025 election, Noboa again defeated González.

Correa has hosted a talk show, Conversation with Correa, on RT Spanish, the Spanish-language project of the Russian state-controlled RT network.

=== Legal cases in Ecuador ===
In July 2018, a judge in Ecuador ordered the arrest of Correa (who by that point lived in Belgium) after he failed to appear in court during a trial surrounding the kidnapping of his political opponent Fernando Balda. Baldo, a lawmaker, was once a Correa ally who later became a critic of Correa; in 2012, he was briefly kidnapped in Bogotá, Colombia, during the 2010 Ecuadorian crisis, before being released by Colombian police, who blamed the Ecuadorean intelligence agency, Senain, for the incident. Balda had at the time been accused of involvement in a coup attempt against Correa. The court said that sufficient evidence existed to try Correa on the kidnapping charges, but suspended the trial because Ecuadoran law provided that Correa could not be tried in absentia. Pablo Romero, the former director of Ecuadoran intelligence, and two police officers were also accused of involvement. Correa denied any involvement in the alleged kidnapping. In July 2018, Interpol rejected an Ecuadorian government's request for a red notice in connection with the case, and called it "obviously a political matter."

Separately, Correa's trial in absentia on charges of bribery began in February 2020 in the National Court of Justice. The Ecuadorian government accused him of accepting illegal bribes from businesses to finance his campaign in the 2023 election, and granting state contracts in return. The case, called Caso Sobornos 2012-2016, stemmed from an investigation initially called Arroz Verde (Green Rice), after the name of a file in an email sent to an ex-Correa aide. The prosecution of the case was led by Attorney-General Diana Salazar. Correa and his former vice president Jorge Glas were among the 20 political and business leaders charged in the case, which alleged $8 million of bribes accepted between 2012 and 2016. Correa has denied wrongdoing and has framed the charges against him as politically motivated and farcical. In April 2020, the court found Correa and the other defendants guilty. The court sentenced Correa and Glas to eight years in prison, and banned all the defendants from having any political role for 25 years.

Moreno's government made three requests to Interpol for a red notice to ask foreign governments to arrest Correa. Interpol rejected each request on human rights grounds.

=== US travel ban ===
On 9 October 2024, U.S. State Department (DoS) Spokesperson Matthew Miller announced that Correa, Glas, and their immediate families were declared as "generally ineligible" from entering the United States due to "significant corruption" allegations during Correa's and Glas' time in office. Correa publicly condemned the announcement, saying that neither he or his family had applied for an American visa, and called the measure arbitrary, barbaric and politically motivated. The Progressive International also rejected the measure and expressed solidarity with Correa, theorising that the measure was linked to Correa's October 2 embrace with Julian Assange after the Parliamentary Assembly of the Council of Europe approved a resolution recognising Assange as a political prisoner of the US. The PI also speculated that it was meant to influence the outcome of the 2025 elections in Ecuador and that it was not related to the rule of law in Ecuador.

== Controversy ==
=== Relationship with the media ===
Correa was highly critical of the Ecuadorian press. Accusing the press of lying and slandering him, he proposed a law that would ban those working in the financial sector from financing media outlets. Paraphrasing Tony Blair, he stated that the Ecuadorian press acted as "a group of wild beasts". He has also regularly criticized it as "...mediocre, incompetent, inaccurate, lying and is a part of the structure of corruption and accomplice of the national disaster." The US State Department noted "There is more than a grain of truth in Correa's observation that the Ecuadorian media play a political role, in this case the role of the opposition", further adding that the news outlets are owned by wealthy elites who see his economic reforms as a threat to their own position. Correa oversaw democratic backsliding in Ecuador.

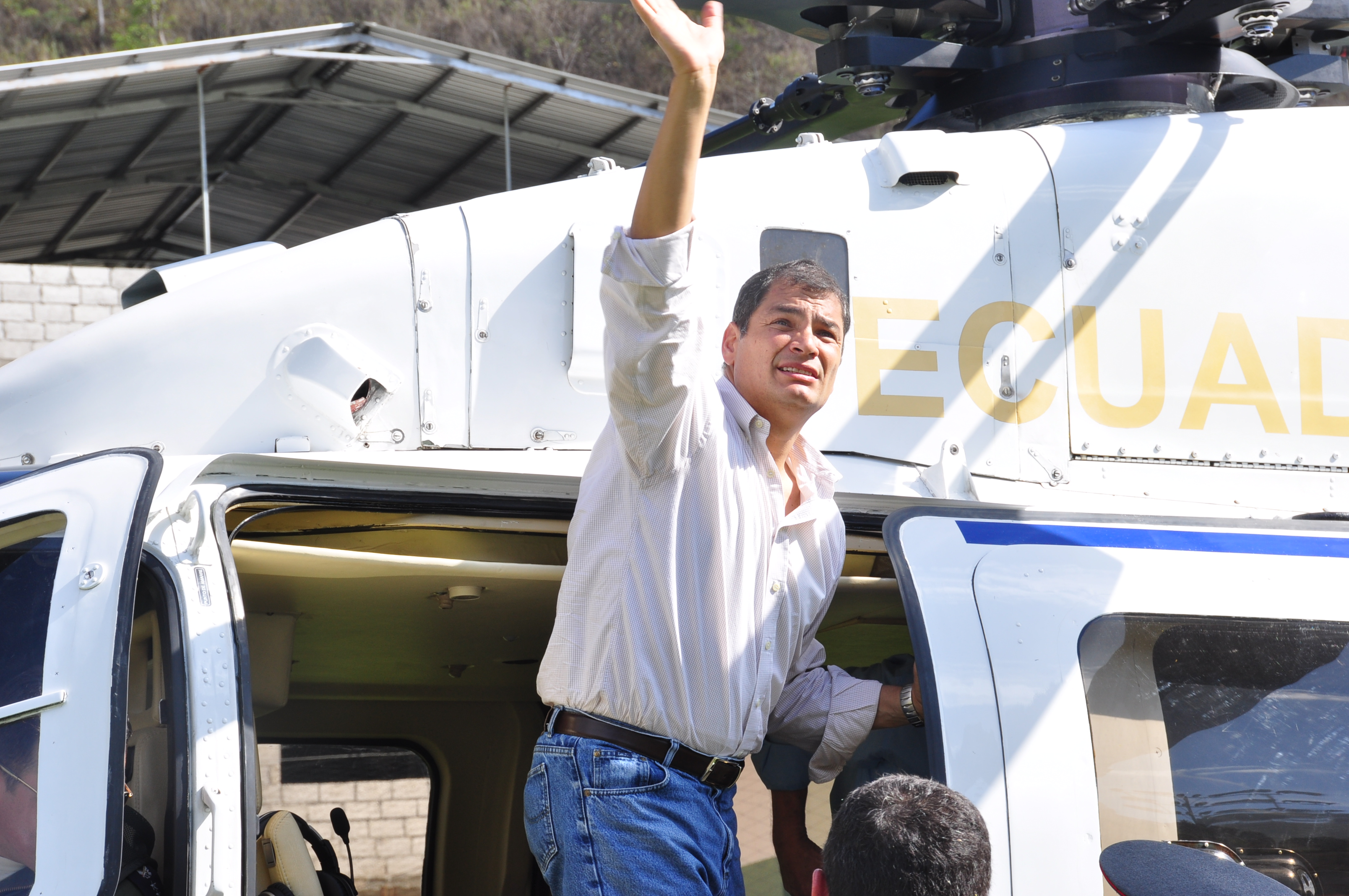
The President steps into a Dhruv helicopter

Correa has criticized several newspapers as El Universo, El Comercio, Diario Hoy, Diario Expreso, La Hora, calling them "news mafias" for criticising the ruling of the Electoral Tribunal depriving 57 opposition legislators of their seats in Congress. Correa argued that the press had remained silent about the holdups that had occurred in state-owned enterprises like Pacifictel and the Ecuadorian Customs Administration (CAE).

On 10 May 2007, Correa filed a lawsuit against Francisco Vivanco Riofrío of the board of directors of the Quito-based La Hora newspaper, over an editorial published in the paper on 9 March. The editorial, titled "Official Vandalism", said that Correa intended to rule Ecuador "with turmoil, rocks and sticks". It described the president's behavior as "shameful." Correa's suit is based on Article 230 of the country's penal code that sets prison penalties of up to two years for contempt, expressed in "threats or libel that would offend the president."

The Inter American Press Association (IAPA) has declared that it is "a clumsy step on the part of the Ecuadorean president to file a criminal charge against a news outlet, accusing it of contempt, an archaic concept in a modern democracy and outmoded in Latin America and which should be eliminated from penal codes, as the IAPA has been insisting." The Committee to Protect Journalists has also protested against the lawsuit: "Fear of criminal penalties will inhibit the Ecuadoran press in reporting and commenting on issues of public interest. We call on President Correa to drop the libel suit against Vivanco and repeal defamation laws that contradict international standards on freedom of expression".

In August 2007 he signed Ecuador to TeleSUR. Correa decided to create Ecuador TV, the first state-owned channel in the country, with the announced intention of producing television with better quality standards than the private channels. Also, newspaper El Telegrafo was purchased and became state-owned. Radio Pública, El Ciudadano, ANDES and PP were also created under Correa's presidency and are administered by state agencies.

=== Attacks on critics ===
In late November 2010 a citizen, Juan Solano, was arrested in Machala for alleged obscene public gestures against Correa's motorcade. Correa said he did not order the arrest, and apologised to Solano for the way he was treated. That same month, some 20 electric workers on strike were laid off after insulting Correa during a visit to Guayaquil. Correa said there was no connection between his visit and the layoffs. On 1 May 2015, Correa stopped his motorcade in downtown Quito to berate 17-year-old Luis Carrera, after he spotted Carrera giving the middle finger gesture at Correa. Carrera was later sentenced to 20 hours of community service.

==== Social media misuse ====
Correa has revealed the real identities of a number of his social media-based critics, leading to those individuals being harassed. In other instances, like in November 2011, August 2012 and January 2013, he responded to Twitter users who attacked him (once with an alleged threat) by publicly ordering the National Intelligence Secretariat to investigate them. The November 2011 incident resulted in the arrest in flagranto of a 44-year-old citizen in Cuenca who was freed the following day and later publicly apologised for what he posted.

Shortly after leaving power, he was criticised for using his Twitter (now X) handle to disclose tax information about critics, such as a journalist who criticised him in June 2017, to whom Correa responded by attaching information on his previous income tax payments and asking him to "tell me where I can refund the small amount of taxes you have paid." This incident led to other online critics, activists and journalists to campaign for the reporting and suspension of his account for his deplatforming, alleging privacy infringement, without success. In April 2019, Facebook blocked access to Correa's "fan" page, which had more than 1.5 million followers, citing the social network's rule against disclosing others' personal data. Correa had been using his account since the previous month to publish details of the "INA Papers" case, involving an alleged offshore bank account linked to Moreno's brother; Lenin Moreno himself was not tied to the account.

In his post-presidential exile, Correa has remained an active social media user, notably on X, formerly Twitter. There, he constantly attacks, insults, and mocks critics, incumbent government officials, journalists, academics, analysts, and anyone he perceives as an enemy or detractor, presuming moral and intellectual superiority, and spending considerable time on social media. One journalist, who has labelled his virtual behaviour as "toxic," has criticised its negative repercussions for Ecuador's national political debate, given his large following (over three million) and social media impact.

=== Edward Snowden ===
In June 2013, US Senator Robert Menendez, chairman of the foreign relations panel, warned Ecuador that accepting PRISM leaker Edward Snowden "would severely jeopardize" preferential trade access the United States provides to Ecuador. "Our government will not reward countries for bad behavior."

President Correa responded by offering a multimillion-dollar donation for human rights training in the United States. "Ecuador offers the United States economic aid of US$23 million annually, similar to what we received with the trade benefits, with the intention of providing education about human rights", said a government spokesman. "Ecuador does not accept pressure or threats from anyone, nor does it trade with principles or submit them to mercantile interests, however important those may be."

Ecuador, which had originally issued Snowden a temporary travel document through its embassy in London, withdrew it because it did not meet the requirements of being in an Ecuadorian Embassy at that time. Snowden said that having the document gave him "the confidence, the courage to get on that plane to begin the journey" and that "there are few world leaders who would risk standing for the human rights of an individual against the most powerful government on earth, and the bravery of Ecuador and its people is an example to the world". President Correa said that, although he respected the decision of the London consul Fidel Narváez to issue it, the document was invalid.

=== Odebrecht scandal ===
The Ecuadorean government continues to investigate the allegations of corruption in the country by Brazil's largest construction company. Ecuadorean officials announced that the Brazilian construction company Odebrecht will not be able to sign any future contracts with public institutions in Ecuador, as authorities continue to investigate alleged corruption in its operations. According to Geovanny Vicente Romero, a political analyst, "Ecuador is in the midst of presidential elections and its lame-duck president Rafael Correa wants to leave the house in order for his successor by taking a position in favor of investigating the Odebrecht case. Correa recently complained that though there were $33.5 million in bribes paid in Ecuador, the individuals involved in the case remain unknown". Some Ecuadorians had grown disenchanted with corruption, as well as Correa's confrontational and polarizing behavior towards media organizations. However, according to Transparency International, corruption decreased under Correa's government.

=== Response to the drop in oil prices ===
In 2014, the price for crude oil, which was Ecuador's main export, began moving downward, from $111 per barrel in June 2014, to $50 per barrel in March 2015. To replace the lost revenue, Correa proposed raising taxes, including an increase of up to 75% in capital gain (Ley de Plusvalia), and a tax on inheritances from 2.5% up to 77.5% (the highest for inheritances of over $849,600).

=== Claims of collaboration with drug traffickers ===
A former cellmate of dead drug trafficker Leandro Norero claimed in 2024 that he had witnessed Correa speaking on a video call with Norero on two occasions while Correa was still the President of Ecuador. According to the witness, the discussions involved the freeing of Jorge Glas.

== Public image and personal life ==
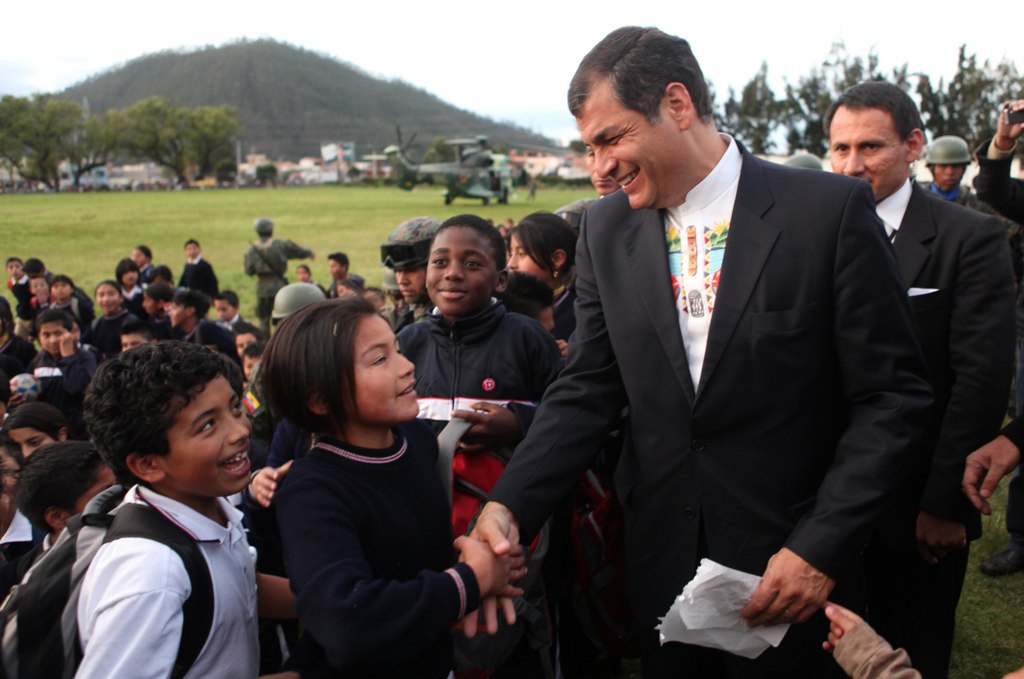
Rafael Correa in Otavalo

According to the Cedatos, Correa began his presidency with a 73% approval rating. An opinion poll carried out by Profiles of Opinion in the cities of Quito and Guayaquil, in March 2012 indicates that 80.5% of those interviewed categorize President Correa's administration as positive. According to the Mitofsky of April 2012, as regards the "approval of leaders in America and the world", President Correa possesses an excellent evaluation. His popularity even increased from 75% to 81% from August 2011 to January 2012. According to the Mitofsky of April 2013, as regards the "approval of leaders in America and the world", President Correa possessed a positive evaluation of 90%. However, his public image in Ecuador was heavily deteriorated after several controversial regulations during his later years as president. Approval ratings for Rafael Correa slipped from 60% in January 2015 to 45% in July 2015. Correa leaves office with a rate of 46%, according to a latest survey by the firm Cedatos.

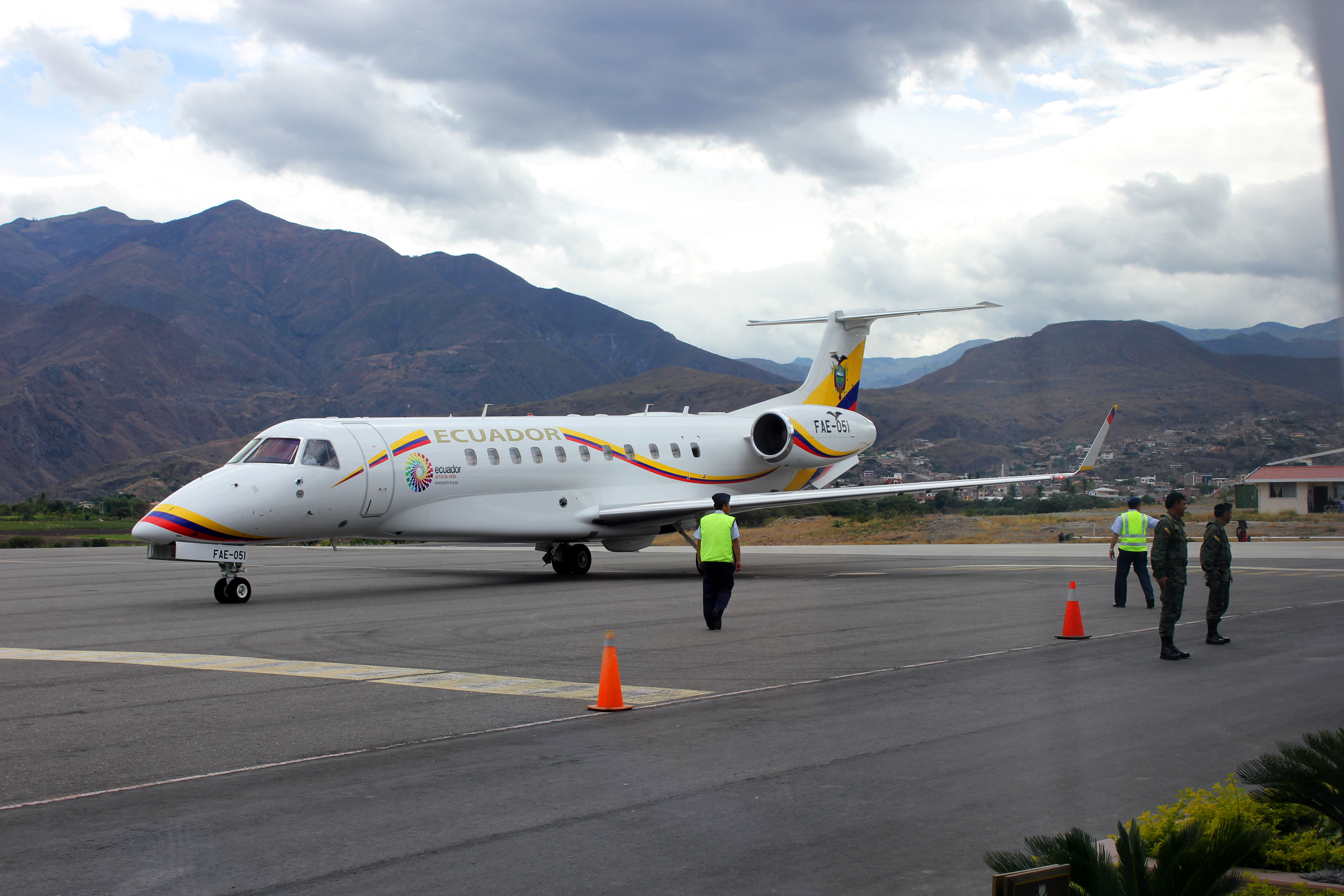
Presidential aircraft Embraer Legacy 600 arriving at Camilo Ponce Enríquez Airport in Loja, Ecuador in September 2013

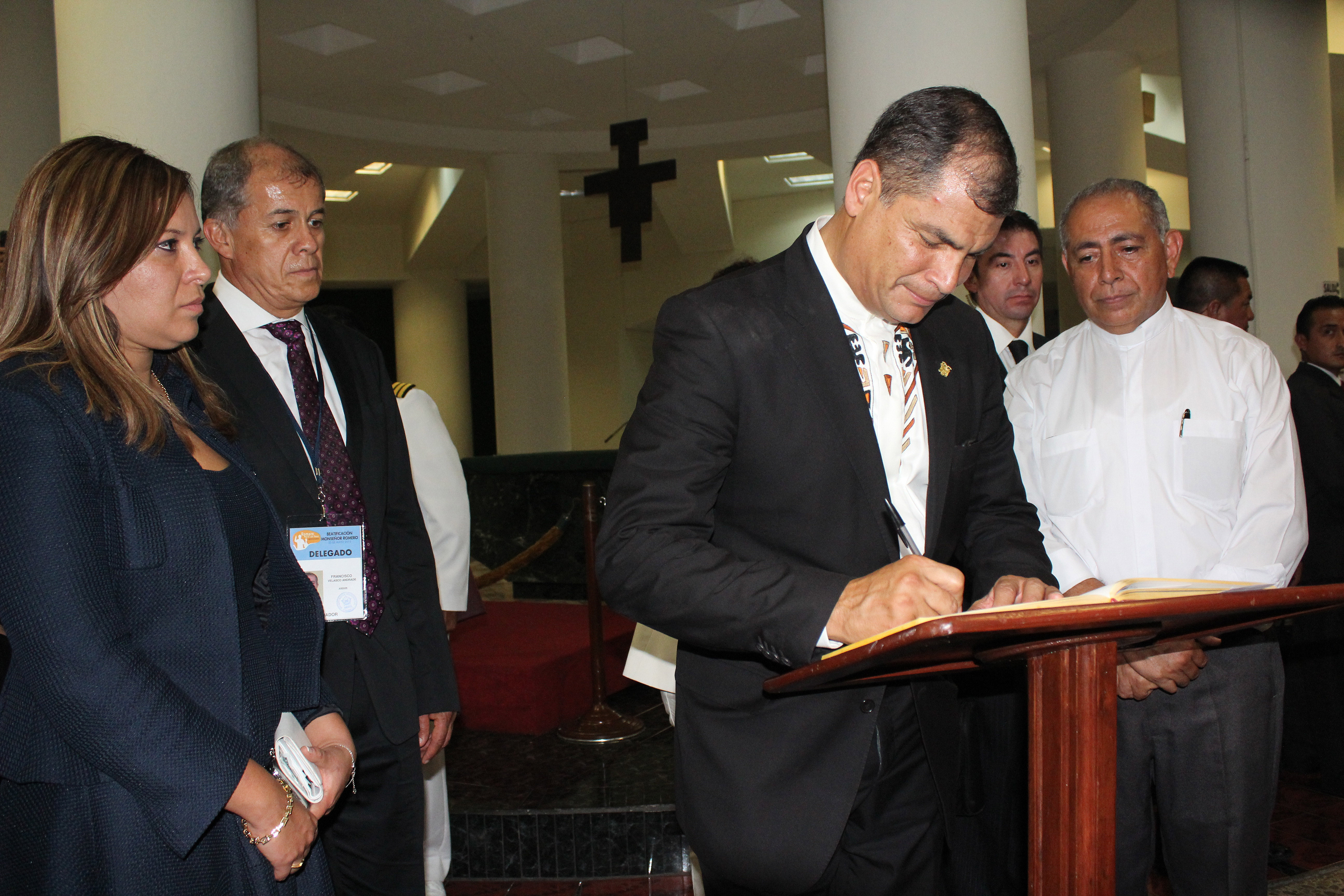
President of Ecuador, Rafael Correa signs the guestbook at the Tomb of Monsignor Óscar A. Romero. During Beatification of Archbishop Romero San Salvador El Salvador

Correa is Catholic, and while President, kept a photograph of the Pope on his desk.

== Political ideology ==
Correa describes himself as an advocate of "socialism of the 21st century". The Economist described Correa as "a left-wing populist", while The Washington Post has characterized Correa's ideological approach as being "economically populist, socially conservative, [and] quasi-authoritarian". The scholars of political science George Philip and Francisco Panizza claimed that like his allies Morales and Chávez, Correa should be categorized as a populist, because he appealed "directly to the people against their countries' political and economic order, divided the social field into antagonistic camps and promised redistribution and recognition in a newly founded political order."

Correa's actions vis-a-vis indigenous communities, however, were described as not populist. To protect Chinese mining interests, "Shuar lands are now under occupation by 8,000 military personnel — marine, air and land troops — equipped with four war-tanks, surveillance drones, aerostatic balloons, mobile satellites and helicopter gunships."

On 23 May 2013, Correa reiterated his opposition to same-sex marriage.

During his time as president, the government led by Correa was associated with the anti-capitalist left, with one observer in 2007 noting “Now anti-imperialist and anti-capitalist governments such as Venezuela (Chavez), Cuba (Castro), Bolivia (Morales) and Ecuador (Correa) have been joined by nationalist centre-left governments such as Brazil (Lula da Silva), Uruguay and Argentina.”

== Honours and awards ==
Award or decoration	Country	Date	Place	Note	Ref
Grand Collar of the Order of the Liberator	Venezuela	11 October 2007	Caracas	Former Venezuelan highest distinction.	
Collar of the Order of the Liberator General San Martín	Argentina	21 April 2008	Quito	Argentinian highest decoration.	
Grand Cross of the Order of Francisco Morazán	Honduras	31 May 2009	Tegucigalpa		
Grand Collar of the Order of the Sun	Peru	9 June 2010	Lima	Peruvian highest award.	
Order of Augusto César Sandino	Nicaragua	15 November 2010	Quito	Highest honour of the Republic of Nicaragua.	
Order of José Martí	Cuba	5 May 2017	Havana	Highest distinction of the Republic of Cuba.	

=== Recognition ===
Rafael Correa has been also awarded with:

- Conquering Insignia of Tarqui, Grand Cross of the Armed forces of Ecuador – in gratitude for the administration carried out for the benefit of the soldiers of the Homeland.
- Order Great Marshal of Ayacucho of Venezuela – for the Bolivarian character of his administration in Ecuador, February 2009.
- Medal of Honor in the Grade of Grand Cross –highest honour of the Congress of Peru, 12 June 2010.
- Great Necklace of the Ecuadorian Federation of Soccer – in November 2010 in gratitude for the expedition of the Law of the Sport.
- Medal of "Distinguished Visitor" – awarded by the UCSG in the inauguration of the III International University Congress, Development and Cooperation.
- Highest honour of the Association of retired Generals of the National Police – for having brought about the approval of pensions to almost 20,000 former uniformed officers.

=== Honorary degrees ===
- Chile: University of Chile Honorary doctorate, 11 March 2008.
- Paraguay: Universidad Nacional de Asunción Honorary doctorate, 24 March 2009.
- Russia: Moscow State Institute of International Relations Honorary doctorate, 30 October 2009.
- Russia: Ural State University Honorary doctorate, 30 October 2009.
- Argentina: University of Buenos Aires Honorary doctorate, 3 December 2010.
- Dominican Republic: Universidad Autónoma de Santo Domingo Honorary doctorate in Economic and Social Sciences, 23 April 2010.
- Peru: University of Chiclayo Honorary doctorate, 28 February 2012.
- Turkey: Bahçeşehir University Honorary doctorate, 16 March 2012.
- Russia: People's Friendship University of Russia Honorary doctorate, 30 October 2013.
- Spain: Universitat de Barcelona Honorary doctorate, 23 April 2014.
- Chile: University of Santiago, Chile Honorary doctorate, 2014.
- Argentina: National University of Córdoba Honorary doctorate, 2015.
- France: Claude Bernard University Lyon 1 Honorary doctorate, 2 December 2015.
- Cuba: University of Havana Honorary doctorate, May 2017.
- Argentina: National University of Quilmes Honorary doctorate, May 2017
- France: Université Grenoble Alpes Honorary doctorate, 7 December 2017
- Argentina: Universidad Nacional de Rosario Honorary doctorate, March 2018.

Also, in April 2010 he received the Prize for Exceptional Academic Achievement 2009 of the University of Illinois. On 3 December 2010, the UBA Cultural Center of Buenos Aires gave him the Faces and Masks Democracy Prize.

== Work published ==
=== Books ===
- Ecuador: From Banana Republic to Non Republic, Random House, Quito, 2009.
- "The Vulnerability of the Ecuadorian Economy: Toward better Economic Politics for Employment Generation, Reduction of poverty and Inequality," Program of the United Nations for Development (UNDP), Quito, 2004.
- "The Challenge of Development: Are We Prepared for the Future?," Publications of the San Francisco de Quito University, Quito, 1996.

=== Academic articles ===
- "The Washington Consensus in Latin America: to a Quantitative Evaluation", working paper, San Francisco de Quito University, Quito, April 2002.
- "Structural Reform and Growth in Latin America: a sensitivity analysis", CEPAL Magazine, number 76, April 2002, Santiago de Chile.
- "One Market, One Currency: the Economic Desirability of Monetary Union for the CAN", working paper, University of Illinois at Urbana-Champaign, Illinois, May 2001.
- "Destabilizing Speculation in the Exchange Market: the Ecuadorian Marries", working paper. University of Illinois at Urbana-Champaign, Illinois, January 2000.
- "Endogenous Institutional Change? To a Critical View of the Political Economy of the Reforms: the Ecuadorian Marries", working paper. University of Illinois at Urbana-Champaign, Illinois, August 1999.
- "The Ecuadorian ISI Revisited", working paper, University of Illinois at Urbana-Champaign, Illinois, May 1999.

Political offices
Preceded by Mauricio Yépez	Minister of Economy and Finance; 2005	Succeeded by Magdalena Barreiro
Preceded by Alfredo Palacio	President of Ecuador; 2007–2017	Succeeded by Lenín Moreno
Party political offices
New office	President of the PAIS Alliance; 2006–2017	Succeeded by Lenín Moreno
Diplomatic posts
Preceded by Michelle Bachelet	President pro tempore of the Union of South American Nations; 2009–2010	Succeeded by Bharrat Jagdeo
Preceded by Luis Guillermo Solís	President pro tempore of the Community of Latin American and Caribbean States; 2015–2016	Succeeded by Danilo Medina
