= List of newspapers in Ecuador =

This is a list of newspapers in Ecuador.

- Ambato
  - El Heraldo
- Babahoyo
  - Clarín
- Bahía de Caráquez
  - El Globo
- Cuenca
  - El Mercurio
  - La Tarde
  - El Tiempo
- Galápagos Islands
  - El Colono
- Guayaquil
  - Diario Extra
  - Diario Super
  - Expreso
  - El Financiero
  - El Meridiano
  - El Metro
  - PP El Verdadero
  - La Segunda del Meridiano
  - El Telégrafo
  - El Universo
- Ibarra
  - Diario del Norte
  - La Verdad
- Latacunga
  - La Gaceta
- Loja
  - Cronica de la tarde
  - El Siglo
- Macas
  - El Observador
- Machala
  - El Correo
  - El Nacional
  - La Opinión
- Manta
  - EL Mercurio de Manta
  - El Metropolitano
- Milagro
  - Prensa La Verdad
- Portoviejo
  - El Diario
- Quevedo
  - Ecos
  - El Planeta
- Quito
  - El Comercio
  - La Hora
  - Hoy
  - Metro Hoy
  - Quito Weekly
  - Últimas Noticias
- Riobamba
  - Los Andes
  - El Espectador
  - La Prensa
- Tulcán
  - La Nación

== See also ==
- List of newspapers
