= César Andrade y Cordero =

Ecuadorian poet, writer, journalist and lawyer

César Humberto Andrade y Cordero (1904–1987) was an Ecuadorian poet, short story writer, journalist and lawyer.

He was born in Cuenca, the son of Leoncio Andrade Chiriboga and Clotilde Cordero Bravo. He was educated in Cuenca, at the San José de los Hermanos Cristianos School and the Benigno Malo High School (where he also taught later). He worked as editor at the newly founded newspaper El Mercurio in his city, at the same time attending the local university whence he obtained a law degree in 1933.

He published extensively in his lifetime, including works such as "Agreste Symphony", a poem that won the Violeta de Oro prize at the Fiesta de la Lira in 1927, followed by "Barro de Siglos" (short stories, 1932), "Dos Poemas de Abril" (1939), "Ventana al Horizonte" (poems, 1942), "Hombre, Destino y Paisaje" (1945), "Lo Genético y lo Ambiental en el Escritor Azuayo" (1958), etc.

In 1959, he published his book of stories "El País de la Gaviota", for which the Municipality of Cuenca awarded him the Fray Vicente Solano medal. Later, in 1965, the national government awarded him the Orden Nacional al Mérito with the rank of Commander.

He wrote for El Telégrafo and El Universo of Guayaquil, where his articles appeared under the pseudonyms of Jacobo Delavuelta and Gaspar de Sisalema, respectively. He also read his poems on the radio on shows such as La Voz del Tomebamba de Cuenca.

He composed songs, for example, the pasillo Sabor de lágrimas which was popularized by Carlota Jaramillo.

In 1944, he was appointed full member of the Casa de la Cultura Ecuatoriana. In 1977, the Casa de la Cultura Ecuatoriana published an anthology of his poetic work under the title of "Poetry."

As a lawyer and professor, he taught philosophy and law at the State University of Cuenca. He died in his hometown on October 10, 1987.
