= National Order of Merit (Ecuador) =

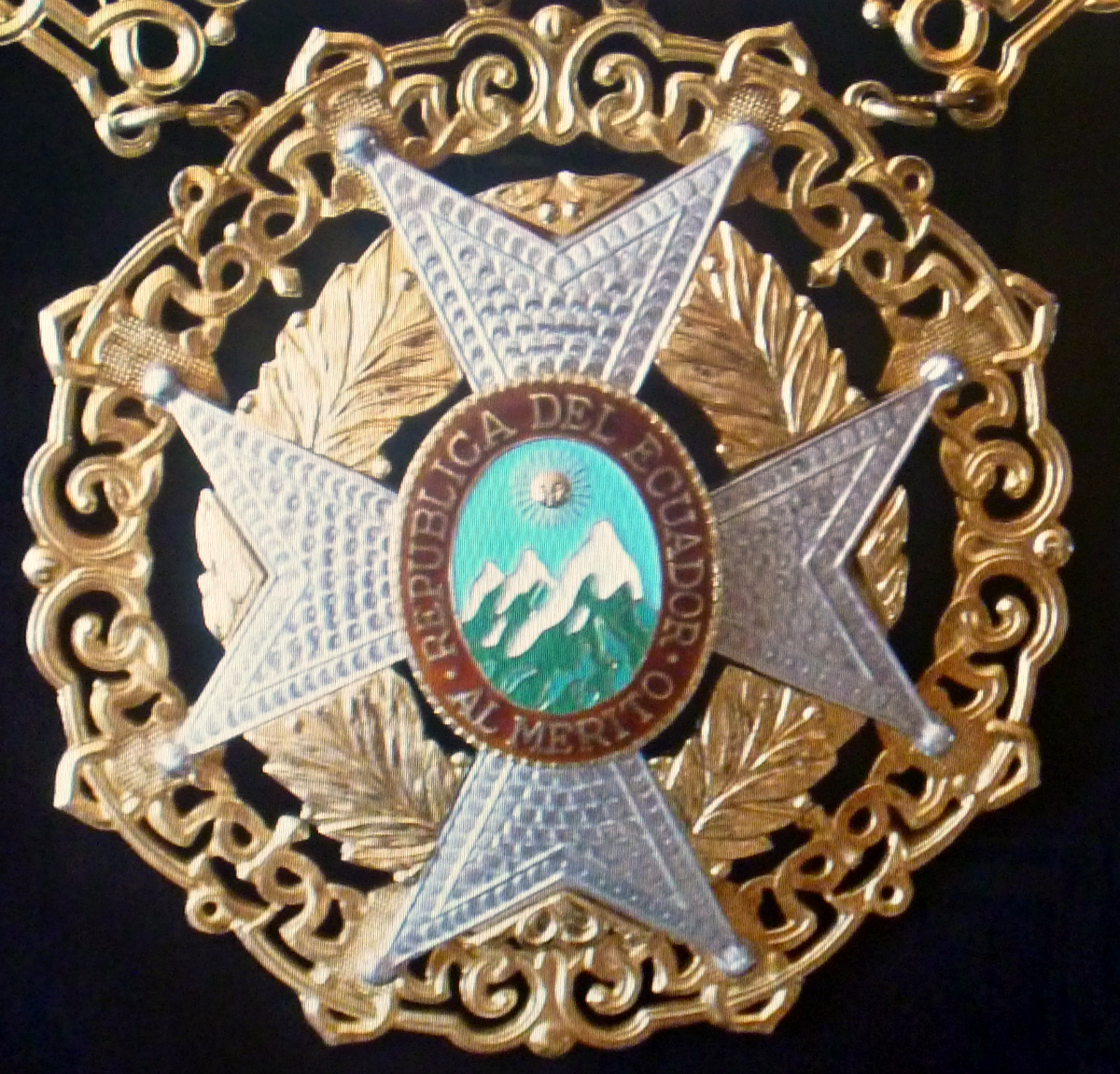
- Grand Cross of the National Order of Merit
- Sponsored by: President of Ecuador
- Country: Ecuador
- Established: 8 October 1921

The National Order of Merit (Spanish: Orden Nacional al Mérito) is a civil order granted by the President of Ecuador. The Order, which is the second highest among the decorations of Ecuador, was established on October 8, 1921, and promulgated in Registro Oficial No. 337 on October 27, 1921. It was later modified by Decree No. 37 on June 28, 1937, and by Decree No. 3109 on September 26, 2002.

== Degrees and distinctions ==
The National Order of Merit is presented by the President of the Republic at personal discretion or by the advice of the ministries. Applicants must have complied with the requirements of service or representation of the country in the civil, military, or police fields.

It has six grades:

- Grand Collar
- Grand Cross
- Grand Officer
- Commander
- Officer
- Knight

== Ribbons ==
- The ribbon for the collar grade is completely yellow.
- The ribbon for other grades is yellow with thin blue and red stripes, one on each edge.

== Selected recipients ==
=== Grand Collar ===
- 2014 (Uruguay) José Mujica
- 2018 (Peru) Martín Vizcarra
- 2018 (Qatar) Tamim bin Hamad Al Thani

=== Grand Cross ===
- (Indonesia) Johannes Leimena
- (Dominican Republic) Rafael Trujillo
- (Dominican Republic) Hugo Tolentino Dipp
- 1993 (Thailand) King Maha Vajiralongkorn
- 2016 (Colombia) Luis Alberto Moreno
- 2016 (Colombia) María Ángela Holguín
- 2016 (Cuba) Bruno Rodríguez Parrilla
- 2016 (Bolivia) David Choquehuanca
- 2026 (United States) Kristi Noem

=== Ecuadorians with the Grand Cross ===
- (Ecuador) Víctor Mideros
- 1981 (Ecuador) María Augusta Urrutia
- 1999 (Ecuador) Gustavo Illingworth Baquerizo
- 2004 (Ecuador) Pavilion of the Society of Artisans of Ibarra
- 2004 (Ecuador) Paolo Legnaioli
- 2004 (Ecuador) Otch Von Finckenstein
- 2004 (Ecuador) Mariana Yépez Andrade
- 2006 (Ecuador) Luis Enrique Sarrazín Dávila
- 2006 (Ecuador) Alejandro Serrano
- 2006 (Ecuador) Gustavo Vega Delgado
- 2006 (Ecuador) Dr. Jose Santiago Castillo Barredo
- 2006 (Ecuador) Dr. Roberto Illingworth Baquerizo
- 2007 (Ecuador) Lautaro Pozo Malo
- 2015 (Ecuador) Rodrigo Fierro
- 2016 (Ecuador) Alfredo Vera Arrata
- 2017 (Ecuador) Magdalena Barreiro

=== Grand Officer ===
- 2006 (Germany) Karl Heinz Laudenbach
- 2007 (Ecuador) Magdalena Barreiro
- 2013 (Ecuador) Alex Patricio Guerra Leiva
- 2013 (Ecuador) Gustavo Cornejo Montalvo
- 2014 (Ecuador) Fundación Fe y Alegría
- 2020 (United States) Debbie Muscarsel-Powel

=== Commander ===
- 1954 (Ecuador) Roberto Pettinato Sr.
- 1965 (Ecuador) César Andrade y Cordero
- 2005 (Ecuador) José Ramón Euceda Ucles
- 2006 (Ecuador) Jorge Núñez Sánchez
- 2006 (Ecuador) Dr. Enrique Alfonso Cedeño Cabanilla
- 2006 (Ecuador) Ernesto Gutierrez Vera
- 2007 (Ecuador) David Gerardo Samaniego Torres
- 2007 (Ecuador) Carlos Ortega Maldonado

=== Officer ===
- 1979 (Senegal) Amadou-Mahtar M'Bow
- 2005 (Ecuador) Verdy Rodríguez Zambrano
- 2005 (Ecuador) Margarita Arosemena Gómez Lince
- 2006 (Argentina) Hebe de Bonafini
- 2006 (Argentina) Estela de Carlotto
- 2006 (Argentina) Elsa Sánchez de Oesterheld
- 2006 (Ecuador) Jürgen Mertens
- 2006 (Ecuador) Michael Wirtz
- 2006 (Ecuador) Juan Eljuri Antón
- 2007 (Ecuador) Fabián Albuja Chávez
- 2007 (Ecuador) Fernando Javier Escalante Jiménez
- 2010 (Ecuador) Grupo Social Fondo Ecuatoriano Populorum Progressio
- 2015 (Ecuador) Teresa Zea Flor de Claero
- 2016 (Spain) José Luis Perales
- 2016 (Ecuador) Patricia González Avellán
- 2017 (Ecuador) Grupo Pueblo Nuevo
- 2017 (Ecuador) Father Antonio Polo
- 2019 (Ecuador) Antonio Valencia

=== Knight ===
- 1946 (Ecuador) Captain Eliecer Bayas Hidrobo
- 1989 (United States) Ing. Aerospacial Walter Valarezo Campozano
- 2005 (Ecuador) Ángel Napoleón Medina Fabre
- 2006 (Ecuador) Pavilion of the City of Cuenca
- 2006 (Ecuador) Pierre Olivares
- 2006 (Ecuador) Rosa Amelia Alvarado Roca
- 2006 (Ecuador) Pavilion of the Metropolitan district of Quito
- 2007 (Ecuador) Carlos Clemente Aguado
- 2007 (Ecuador) Carlos Enrique Mejía Carrillo
- 2010 (Ecuador) William W. Phillips
- 2010 (Ecuador) José Tonello
- 2020 (United Kingdom) Sir David Attenborough
