= Diego Borja =

Ecuadorian economist and politician

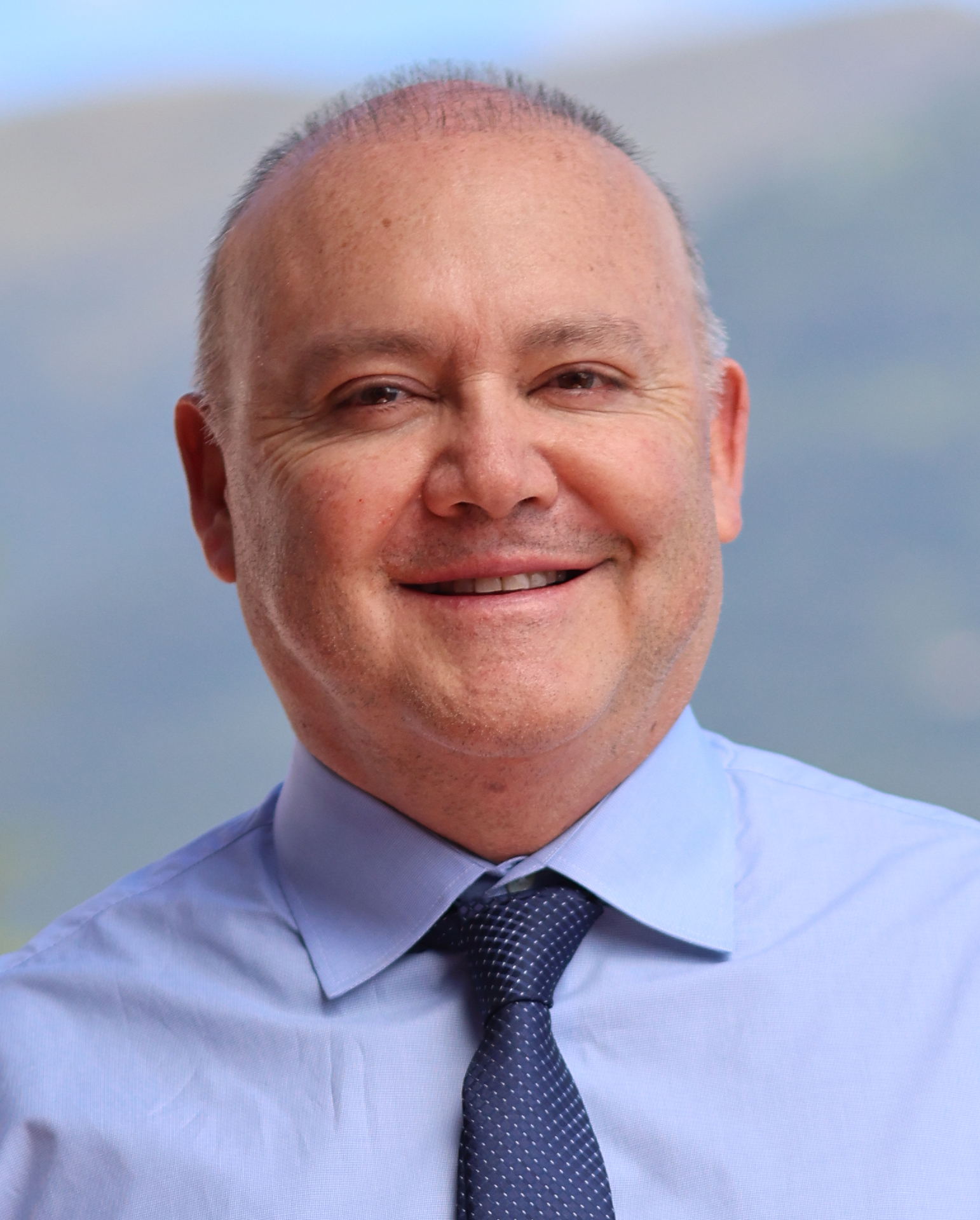
- Borja in 2024

Coordination Minister for Economic Policy
- In office December 23, 2008 – April 5, 2010
- President: Rafael Correa
- Preceded by: Pedro Páez Pérez
- Succeeded by: Katiuska King

Member of the Constituent Assembly from Pichincha
- In office November 29, 2007 – October 25, 2008

Minister of Economy and Finance
- In office December 29, 2005 – July 7, 2006
- President: Alfredo Palacio
- Preceded by: Magdalena Barreiro
- Succeeded by: Armando Rodas Espinel

Personal details
- Born: Diego Borja Cornejo; May 1, 1964 (age 61); Quito, Ecuador
- Political party: Citizen Revolution Movement
- Education: Pontifical Catholic University of Ecuador
- Occupation: Economist, politician

Diego Borja Cornejo (born May 1, 1964) is an Ecuadorian economist and politician. He is the Citizen Revolution Movement vice presidential candidate in the 2025 general election as the running mate of Luisa González.

Between 2005 and 2006 he served as Minister of Economy and Finance during the Alfredo Palacio administration. He was elected member of the National Constitutional Assembly in 2007, representing the Pichincha Province. He resigned this position to be appointed Coordination Minister for Economic Policy a year later under the Rafael Correa administration. He left office in 2010.

== Early life ==
Borja was born in Quito, Ecuador. He earned a master's degree from the Catholic University of Louvain and an Economic degree from the Pontificia Universidad Católica del Ecuador, at the latter he was also a professor.

Before starting his political career, Borja held several positions in the public, private, and academic sectors. He served as executive director of the Flower Producers and Exporters Association (Expoflores); President of the Catholic Student Federation (Federación de Estudiantes Universitarios Católicos del Ecuador-Quito, FEUCE-Q); consultant on competitiveness and productivity for several institutions.

== Minister of Economy and Finance ==
Borja served as Minister of Economy and Finance of Ecuador from December 28, 2005, to July 7, 2006. In that position he was named Governor of the Development Bank of Latin America and the Caribbean (CAF), the Inter-American Development Bank, the International Bank for Reconstruction and Development or World Bank, and the International Monetary Fund.

Under his leadership, a reform of the Hydrocarbons Law (Ley de Hidrocarburos) was enacted so the Ecuadorian state could recover 50% of the revenues produced by private oil companies. Before this action, some private oil companies were contributing as little as 18% of their revenues to the public sector while earning profits of as much as 250% per year on their investments.

During his tenure, the Minister of Energy and Mines, Iván Rodríguez, decreed the expiration (caducidad) of the contract with the Occidental Petroleum Co., which was producing 100,000 barrels per day. The expiration was due to repeated violations of the contract and the Hydrocarbons Law. Minister Diego Borja was appointed to a high-level Commission to oversee the transfer and operation of the oil fields that were previously operated by Occidental Petroleum and was instrumental in creating the administrative unit formed to operate these fields.

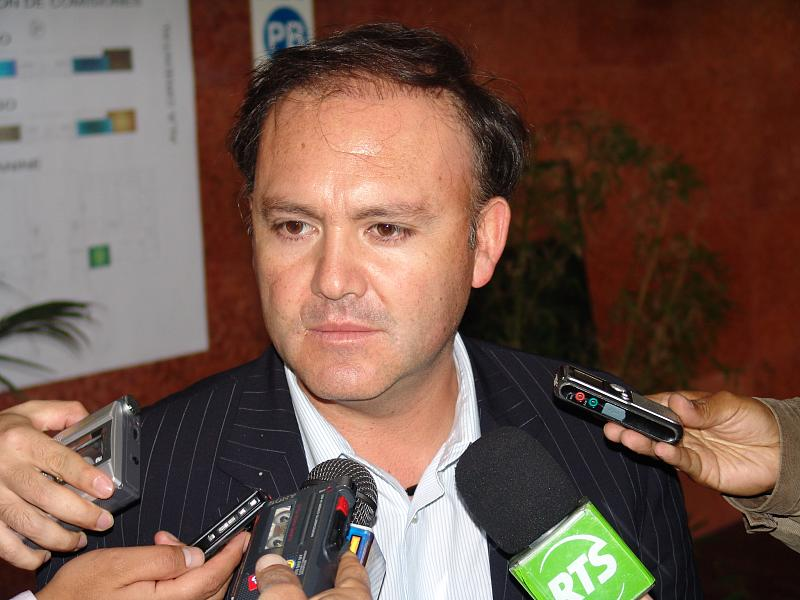
Borja in November 2008

Other key accomplishments of his tenure were the repurchase of $740 million of high interest rate bonds (Ecuador Global 2012, paying 12% annual interest), as well as a reduction in the overall public external debt stock (both in absolute terms, and also as a percentage of GDP, which fell below the target of 30% of GDP). Inflation and unemployment also fell during this period, and a projected fiscal deficit of 0.8% of GDP was reverted to a fiscal surplus of 1.4% of GDP. Economic growth was also significant, both in the oil and non-oil sectors.

Borja organized the CEREPS oil fund, to establish priorities in public sector investment, directing these funds towards infrastructure investment, the oil and electric sectors, education, health and the environment.

When Borja denounced a change that had been made to the regulations of the Hydrocarbons Law in an attempt to benefit the foreign oil companies, the chief of staff, Jose Modesto Apolo, asked for his resignation. Subsequently, Borja denounced Apolo's role in the change to the regulations, and Apolo also resigned his office.

== Congressional career ==
Before forming "Movimiento Poder Ciudadano", Borja was a national leader of "Movimiento Nuevo País" (New Country Movement), where he was an adviser to presidential candidate Freddy Ehlers, as well as alternate representative from Ecuador to the Andean Parliament.

Borja was elected a member of the Constitutional Assembly on September 30, 2007, as a candidate of the alliance between the social-democratic "Izquierda Democrática" (Party of the Democratic Left), the Poder Ciudadano Movement, and two other democratic socialist movements, "Acuerdo Democrático" and "Nuevo Acuerdo Nacional". He was elected as the first candidate in the province of Pichincha, which includes the capital city of Quito. He resigned a year later to serve in the administration of Rafael Correa.

== Correa administration ==
On December 23, 2008, President Rafael Correa picked Borja to serve as Coordination Minister for Economic Policy under his administration.

Borja left the Correa administration on April 5, 2010. After leaving office, he was a frequent critic of Correa's successor Lenin Moreno.

== 2025 vice presidential campaign ==
In August 2024, the Citizen Revolution Movement announced that Borja will serve as the party's vice presidential candidate in the 2025 general election as the running mate of former National Assembly member Luisa González. In February 2025, the González-Borja ticket came in second place after winning 43.97% of the vote, successfully advancing to the run-off against President Daniel Noboa.

Political offices
Preceded by Magdalena Barreiro	Minister of Finance; December 28, 2005 – July 7, 2006	Succeeded by Armando Rodas
