= Ecuador Communication Law =

The Ecuadorian Communication Law, also called the "organic" communication law, was implemented on June 14, 2013. According to the president of Ecuador Rafael Correa, the law's purpose is to democratize the media "strengthen freedom of expression and promote 'a good press'" in the country. The communication law consists of 109 articles. These articles are organized under five different categories.

== Titles/Categories ==
Title I has all the articles that deal with the general dispositions or guidelines that communication mediums must follow.

Title II deals with the normative rules for audiovisual communication.

Title III includes the basic norms for regulating the audio visual communication market.

Title IV is concerned with services from public audiovisual lenders.

Title V addresses the state council of audiovisual communication.

Title VI is the basic sanctioning regiment.

== Background ==
In September 2010, a crisis arising from pay disputes with the police resulted in president Rafael Correa being held captive at a police hospital. Correa was freed following clashes occurred between rebellious police forces and loyal army and police forces at the hospital. The following February, Emilio Palacio, a journalist for El Universo, wrote a column about the events that called Correa a dictator and said the president should be criminally charged for ordering soldiers to fire on a hospital full of civilians. As a result, Correa sued Palacio along with the owners of the newspaper El Universo for libel. Correa sued the independent newspaper for defamation and demanded 80 million dollars in reparation, with a three-year jail sentence to be issued to Palacio and owners. Correa ended withdrawing his lawsuit against these individuals; however, he did want to change the law for the future.

== Law Passed ==
In order to avoid a repetition of the El Universo case, Correa passed a communication law on June 14, 2013. Article 26 of the law limits periodical information gathering if the intent is to defame someone of political standing, or a citizen. Communicators' rights are also altered; sources used for claims do not guarantee the safety of journalists if they conflict with the law. Private communication channels and radio now have to dedicate approximately a third of their airing time towards public transmission. The other two thirds of transmission is for the private and public sector communities.

== Criticism ==
The communication law has received much criticism, with claims that the law is inefficient and limiting in regards to freedom of speech. The Colombian Association of Newspapers and Informative Media (Andiarios) called the document "the final stab" against freedom of expression in the country. Frank La Rue, the United Nations' Special Rapporteur on freedom of expression, said that the law needs to be re-analyzed further and sent back to the Republic's Congress so it can be discussed more broadly before its approval.
