= Fernando Balda =

Ecuadorian politician (born 1971)

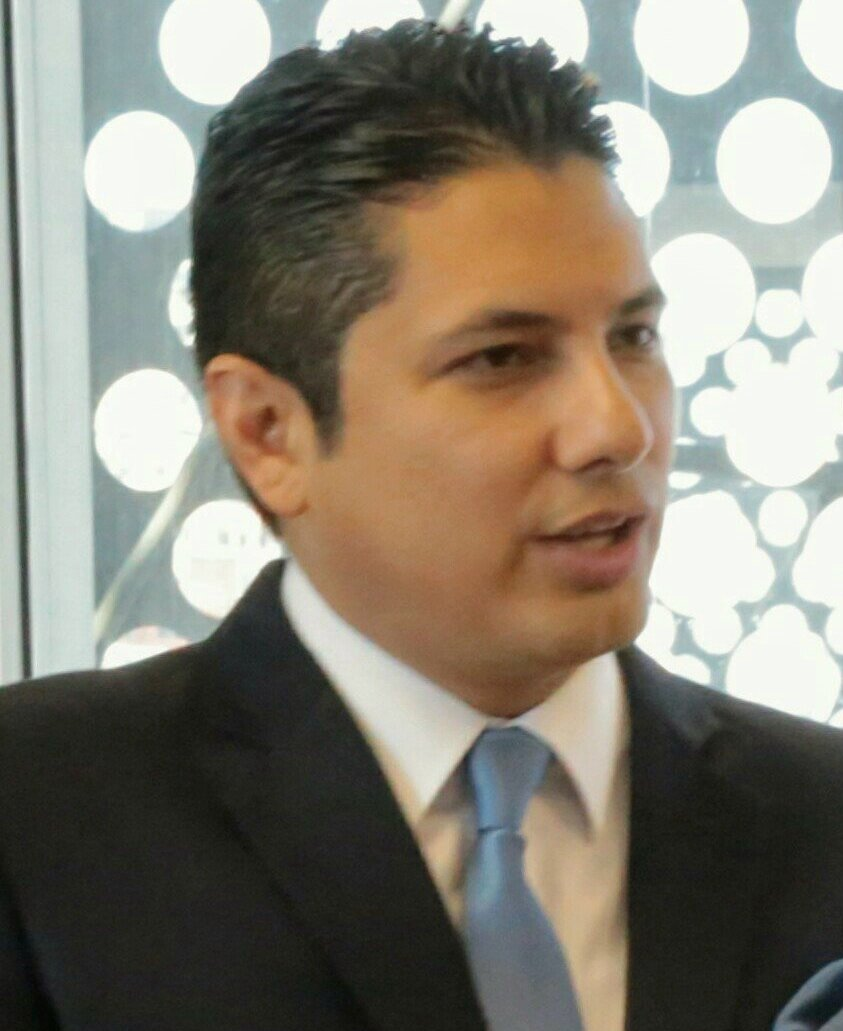
- Born: Fernando Marcelo Balda Flores; 3 August 1971 (age 55); Guayaquil, Ecuador
- Education: University of Guayaquil
- Occupations: Politician and activist
- Political party: PAIS Alliance (2006–2008); Patriotic Society (2008–2016); Unity, Change and Progress (since 2016); Ahead Ecuadorian Ahead (since 2018)
- Criminal charge: Slander
- Criminal penalty: 2 years in prison (2012–2014)
- Criminal status: Served sentence

Fernando Marcelo Balda Flores (born 3 August 1971) is an Ecuadorian politician.

== Politics ==
Balda stated that he had been abducted in July 2012 in Bogotá, Colombia, to which he had fled because in 2009 he had dropped his support for the Ecuadorian government, and changed from being a member of parliament for Alianza País to an opposition member of the Patriotic Society Party, and had been accused of involvement in a failed coup in 2010. Balda was extradited to Ecuador by Colombian authorities in October 2012 to serve a prison sentence. As of 2019, Ecuador is asking for its former president Rafael Correa to be extradited from Belgium for involvement in the purported abduction.

Balda signed the Madrid Charter, a document drafted by the right-wing Spanish party Vox that describes left-wing groups as enemies of Ibero-America involved in a "criminal project" that are "under the umbrella of the Cuban regime".

Sofía Espín who was a delegate for the Citizen Revolution visited Jéssica Falcón, who was in prison for allegedly being involved with the kidnapping of Balda. It was said that she and her lawyer, Yadira Cadena, made an offer of legal assistance, money, and political asylum in Belgium to Balda as she was willing to retract her evidence in the Balda case. Espin was investigated and dismissed from the National Assembly in November 2018 with a majority of 94 votes. Espin herself went into exile.

== Personal life ==
Balda is married and has four children.
