= La Hora =

Ecuadorian newspaper

La Hora is the newspaper with the most regional editions in Ecuador. It specializes in regional news and runs a total of 10 regional editions. The headquarters of La Hora are located in Quito.

== See also ==
- List of newspapers in Ecuador
