= Magdalena Barreiro =

Ecuadorian politician (born 1956)

- Born: 1956 (age 69–70); Quito, Ecuador
- Education: Escuela Politécnica del Ejército (BSc); MIT Sloan School of Management (MSc); Illinois Institute of Technology Stuart School of Business (PhD)
- Occupations: Economist, professor
- Known for: Former Minister of Economy and Finance of Ecuador

Magdalena Barreiro (born 1956 in Quito) is an Ecuadoran former Economy Minister and professor of finance.

== Education ==
She holds a bachelor's in Business Management from Escuela Politécnica del Ejército (Army Polytechnic School, Ecuador), as well as a Master of Science in Management from the MIT Sloan School of Management and a Ph.D in Management Science with a concentration in Finance from the Illinois Institute of Technology Stuart School of Business.

== Career ==
=== As an economist ===
Barreiro was a Financial Sector Coordinator at the Central Bank of Ecuador from 1992 to 1994. She was responsible for the supervision and implementation of the Financial Sector Project with the IDB, which included the financial sector and capital markets law, social security reform, and the modernization of other government financial institutions

From 1997 to 1998, Barreiro served as an economic and financial advisor for the National Council for State Modernization and Privatization (CONAM). In this capacity, she supervised every aspect for company valuations in the privatization of the national telecommunications and electric sector.

She is currently the Dean of the Management School and Professor of Finance at Universidad San Francisco de Quito and serves as an independent consultant on Ecuador’s economic and political developments for GlobalSource Partners Inc, a network of independent advisors based in New York. She also holds a courtesy Professor position at the Johns Hopkins Carey Business School.

=== As a politician ===
In 2005, Barreiro served as Ecuador’s Minister of Economy and Finance and as the General Undersecretary of Finance. She was responsible for managing fiscal and economic policies and oversaw the country’s fiscal finances. Barreiro is credited with bringing the country back to the international capital markets with its first new sovereign debt offering in almost a decade and re-establishing good working relationships with its creditors.

Preceded by Rafael Correa	Minister of Economy and Finance; August 8, 2005 – December 28, 2005	Succeeded by Diego Borja
