= National Intelligence Secretariat (Ecuador) =

Ecuadorian intelligence agency (2009–2018)

National Intelligence Secretariat (Secretaría Nacional de Inteligencia, SENAIN) was the principal intelligence agency of the Republic of Ecuador. The agency was created in September 2009. Directors include Rommy Vallejo, Francisco Jijón, Homero Arellano, Luis Yépez, Raúl Patiño (brother of Ricardo Patiño) and Pablo Romero Quezada.

In June 2013, news and entertainment website BuzzFeed published documents that revealed SENAIN's domestic surveillance program using equipment purchased from two Israel-based companies, Elkat Security Engineering Ltd and UVision Air Ltd. SENAIN reportedly purchased the equipment via an intermediary named Gabriel Marcos Guecelevich.

SENAIN was also involved in the Hacking Team scandal.

Although Paul Manafort had not logged into the Ecuadoran embassy in London, SENAIN had records of his visits in 2015 and March 2016, which SENAIN had recorded him as "Paul Manaford [sic]", along with Russians. Julian Assange, the founder of WikiLeaks, was using the embassy as a refuge at the time. The account of an Assange-Manafort meeting was not corroborated by other news organisations.

In March 2018, SENAIN was shut down by Ecuador's President, Lenín Moreno, who said closing the agency was necessary to “guarantee the security needs of the country”.

== See also ==
- List of intelligence agencies
