= El Mercurio (Ecuador) =

El Mercurio is a newspaper published in Cuenca, Ecuador. It is the city's main newspaper.
