= Julio Martínez =

Julio Martínez or Martinez may refer to:

== Association footballers ==
- Julio Martínez (footballer, born 1985), Salvadoran football winger
- Julio Martínez (footballer, born 1982), Paraguayan football forward
- Julio Martínez (footballer, born 2000), Spanish football second striker

== Other sports people ==
- Julio Martínez (journalist) (1923–2008), Chilean sports commentator
- Julio René Martínez, Guatemalan athlete
- J. D. Martinez (full name Julio Daniel Martinez), American baseball outfielder
- Julio Martínez (weightlifter) (born 1949), Puerto Rican weightlifter

== Others ==
- Julio Martínez (Argentine politician), Argentine politician of the Radical Civic Union (UCR)
- Julio Martínez, Venezuelan revolutionary, co-founder of the Venezuelan Revolutionary Party in 1926
- Julio Martinez Acosta (1879–1957), Ecuadorian lieutenant and politician
- Julio Martínez Montt (1894–1977), Chilean industrialist and politician
- Julio Martínez Oyanguren (1901–1973), Uruguayan musician and mechanical engineer

== See also ==
- Julia Martínez, actress
- Júlio Martins (disambiguation)
