= Gregory Wilpert =

German sociologist and activist (born 1965)

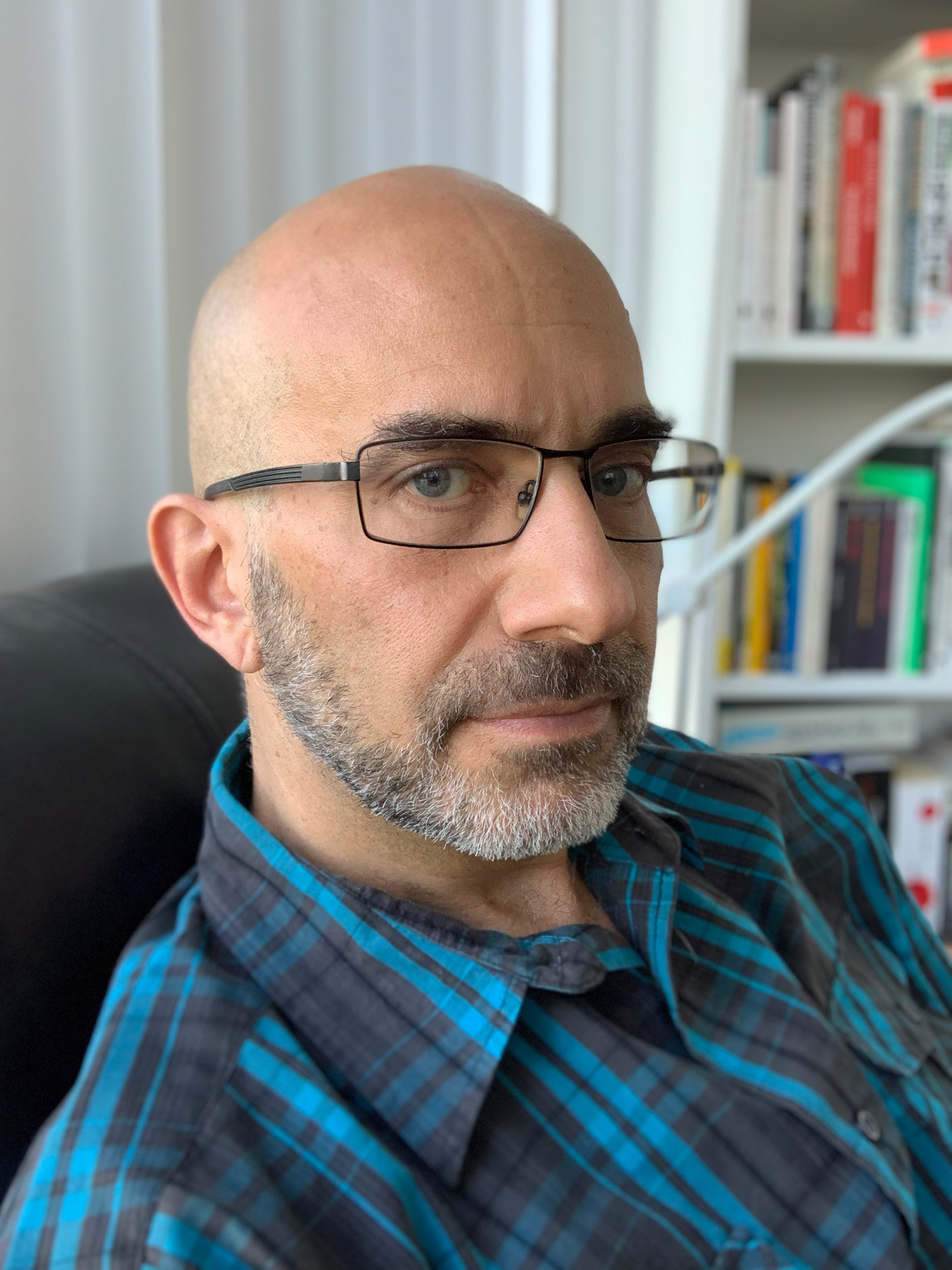
- Born: June 5, 1965 (age 61); Berlin, Germany
- Education: University of California, San Diego; Brandeis University
- Occupation: Sociologist • journalist
- Years active: 2003–present
- Organization: Venezuela Analysis
- Spouse: Carol Delgado Arria
- Website: gregwilpert.net venezuelanalysis.com

Gregory Wilpert is a German activist and founder of Venezuelanalysis.com, a website supportive of Hugo Chávez's Bolivarian Revolution in Venezuela. He has been described as "perhaps the most prominent Chavista". He is currently an editor at the Institute for New Economic Thinking.

== Education ==
In 1988, Wilpert graduated from UC-San Diego with a Bachelor of Arts in sociology. He later graduated with a doctorate in sociology from Brandeis University in 1994.

== Career ==
=== Venezuelanalysis.com ===
In 2000, Wilpert moved to Caracas, Venezuela, with his Venezuelan wife, Carol Delgado. In 2003, Wilpert founded Venezuelanalysis with one of the founders of Aporrea, Martin Sanchez, who set up the "technical side" of the English-language site. The set up of Venezuelanalysis was aided by Chávez's government. In 2008, Green Left Weekly described Venezuelanalysis as the "leading English language source of information on the [Bolivarian] revolution".

In 2007, Wilpert's book Changing Venezuela by Taking Power: The History and Politics of the Chavez Government was published by Verso Books.

In 2008, Wilpert and Delgado moved to New York, as Delgado began to serve as Consul General of Venezuela in New York. Wilpert continued to work as the main editor of the website until 2009, though he still serves on its board of directors.

Following the death of Hugo Chávez in March 2013, Wilpert and Eva Golinger appeared in a Democracy Now! segment, in which Wilpert praised Chávez's achievements in reducing poverty and increasing participatory democracy, criticised his response to crime.

=== TeleSUR ===
In 2014, his wife moved to Quito, Ecuador to serve as the Venezuelan Ambassador to Ecuador. From March 2014 to September 2015, Wilpert then served as the director of English-language programming for TeleSUR, a state-run media company primarily funded by the Venezuelan government.

=== The Real News Network ===
From February 2016 until March 2018, Wilpert worked as a producer for The Real News Network first in Quito, Ecuador and later in Baltimore, MD.

== Personal life ==
In 1997, Wilpert married Carol Delgado Arria, a government official who served various roles in Hugo Chávez's administration.
