= Venezuelanalysis =

Website supporting the Bolivarian Revolution

- Available in: English
- Creator: Gregory Wilpert
- Website: venezuelanalysis.com
- Commercial: No
- Launched: September 2003
- Current status: Active

Venezuelanalysis is a pro-Bolivarian Revolution website that describes itself as "an independent website produced by individuals who are dedicated to disseminating news and analysis about the current political situation in Venezuela." Its stated objective is "to counter the corporate media propaganda against the Bolivarian Revolution by giving a voice to leftist and grassroots movements in Venezuela".

== History ==
Greg Wilpert founded the website in 2003 with Martin Sanchez, one of the founders of the pro-Chávez website Aporrea. Sanchez set up the technical side of the site and Wilpert worked on editing. The set up of Venezuelanalysis was also aided by the Venezuelan government. Venezuelanalysis describes itself as "an independent website produced by individuals who are dedicated to disseminating news and analysis about the current political situation in Venezuela." Its stated objective is "to provide a counter-narrative to mainstream media coverage of the Bolivarian Revolution, based on the perspective of leftist and grass-roots movements in Venezuela." Wilpert described this perspective as "clearly pro-Bolivarian Revolution, but also critical of some aspects from a leftist perspective".

In 2008, Wilpert moved to New York with his wife, who had been appointed as Venezuela's Consul General to the United States. Wilpert continued to work as the main editor of the website until 2009, and is a member of its board of directors. In 2009, Venezuela Analysis, Inc. was registered as a domestic not-for-profit corporation in New York State.

== Organization ==
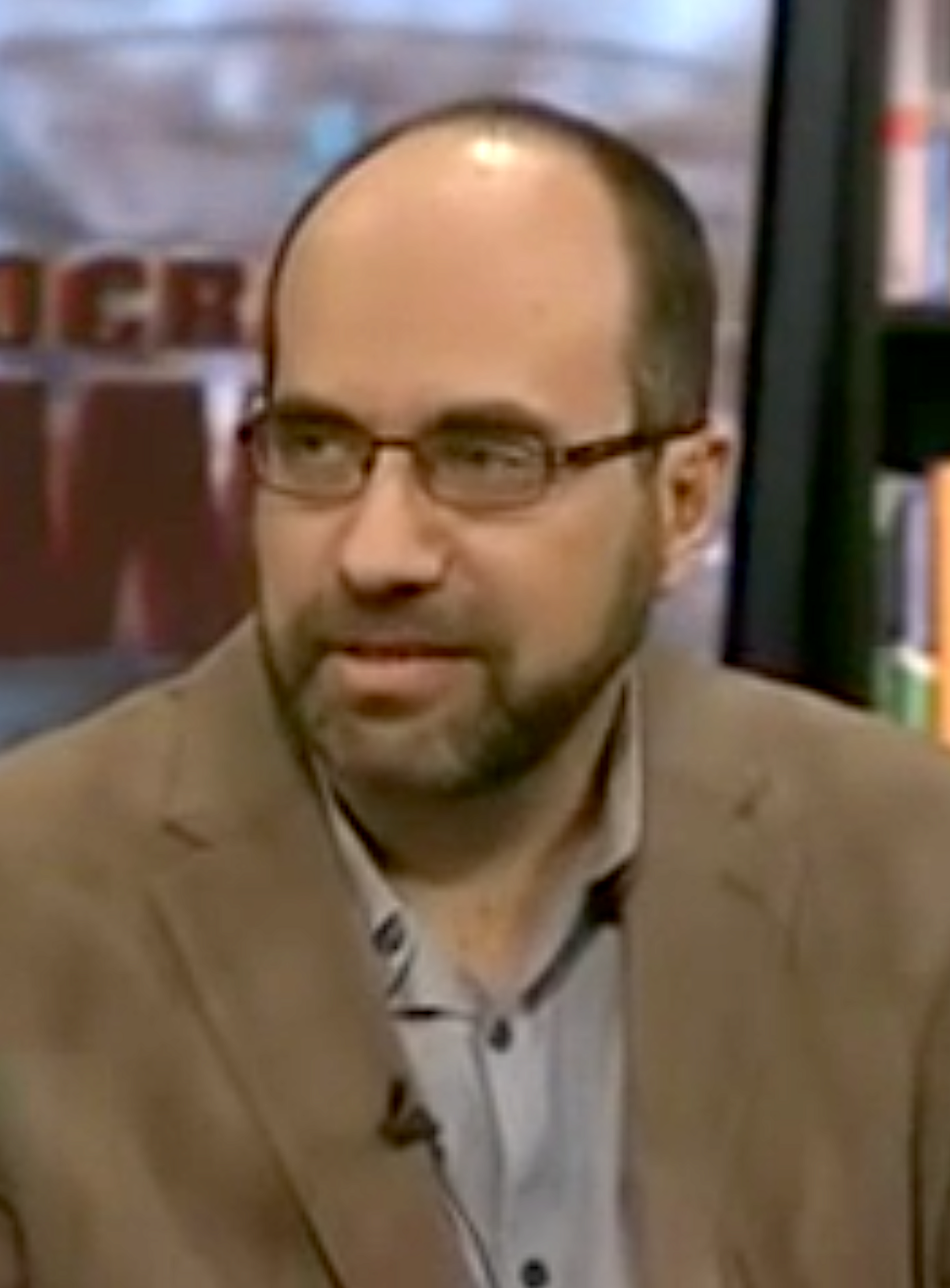
Gregory Wilpert, founder of Venezuelanalysis.com

Venezuelanalysis says it is a "project of Venezuela Analysis, Inc., which is registered as a non-profit organization in New York State and of the Fundación para la Justicia Económica Global, which is registered in Caracas, Venezuela."

=== Personnel ===
Gregory Wilpert and Martin Sánchez co-founded the Venezuelanalysis site in September 2003. Wilpert was the site's main editor for six years, until 2009, and is a member of the site's board of directors. The Global Post described Wilpert as "perhaps the most prominent Chavista." Wilpert's wife Carol Delgado was named Consul General of Venezuela in New York in 2008.

Venezuelanalysis wrote that "as of early 2008 its writers are all working on the site from their homes in various places in Venezuela, with volunteers contributing from around the world." The website has contributors from England, Australia, and the US with a mix of activist and academic credentials, including authors Nikolas Kozloff, who periodically contributes to the site, and Eva Golinger. As of 2019 the site's staff consists of Gregory Wilpert, Jan Kühn, Rachael Boothroyd, Lucas Koerner, Jeanette Charles, Katrina Kozarek, Paul Dobson, Cira Pascual Marquina and Ricardo Vaz. According to Brian Nelson, author of The Silence and the Scorpion, Venezuelanalysis.com performs "damage control" for the Venezuelan government and "tried to discredit virtually every independent human rights study" while Hugo Chávez was in office as part of "an integral part of Venezuela’s propaganda complex".

== Funding and support ==
In 2007, Wilpert stated the site had received "some funding" from the Venezuelan government's Ministry of Culture, in addition to "grassroots donations." At that time, Venezuelanalysis had "mutual support agreements" with Green Left Weekly, Alia2, TeleSUR and others.

In February 2014, Venezuelanalysis ' stated that its Web server services and bandwidth was donated by Aporrea. and in April 2014, the website said that it relied totally on reader donations and received no funding from any government.

In 2019, the site received, as part of a journalism award, a cash prize from the Association for Investment in Popular Action Committees, a pro-Bashar al-Assad group. Wilpert stated that Venezuelanalysis were not familiar with the organization behind the prize.

== Political stance ==
Venezuelanalysis is pro-Bolivarian Revolution. In Al-Jazeera, Nikolas Kozloff described it as "a website sympathetic to the Chávez government." Other sources say it is "left-leaning".

== See also ==
- Misión Verdad
