= 2010 Ecuadorian crisis =

Police blockade, occupation, and hostage-taking

Date	September 30, 2010
Location	Ecuador
Result	Crisis ended

Belligerents
Ecuador: Armed Forces of Ecuador; National Police of Ecuador	National Police of Ecuador (rebellious elements)

Casualties and losses
- 8 dead, 274 injured

The 2010 Ecuadorian crisis took place on 30 September 2010, when National Police operatives blockaded highways, occupied the National Assembly, blocked Mariscal Sucre International Airport in Quito and José Joaquín de Olmedo International Airport in Guayaquil, and took control of the premises of Ecuador TV, in what they claimed was a strike to oppose a government-sponsored law that supposedly reduced their benefits. Unrest and looting were reported in seven provinces of the country because of the lack of law enforcement.

President Rafael Correa went to the police headquarters in Quito despite recommendations from his own security personnel not to attend and make things worse. He was ill-received, delivering a harsh speech in which he accused the police ranks of treason to the people and the country, and dared them to kill him. After he was pelted by the police ranks, and a tear gas canister went off, Correa was escorted to a hospital in the same compound. According to El País, The New York Times, El Correo and Correa himself, the policemen then surrounded the building and prevented him from leaving. From the hospital, Correa declared a state of emergency and said that a "coup d'état was taking place", and attributed responsibility to the government's opposition. According to state news agency ANDES, police radio recordings from the night of 30 September revealed that the police intended to kill Correa. Thousands of civilians came out to support Correa and gathered around the hospital in which he was held hostage. Clashes occurred between rebellious police forces and loyal army and police forces, who successfully took Correa out of the hospital after he had allegedly been held for 10 hours.

Ecuador's Health Minister said the events had left eight dead and 274 people wounded. Of the casualties, it is known that one was a university student, and that a police officer and two military personnel involved in the rescue operation were also among those killed.

The Union of South American Nations (UNASUR), the Spanish Prime Minister José Luis Rodríguez Zapatero, and the Secretary General of the Organization of American States, José Miguel Insulza, referred to the events as an attempted coup d'état.

== Background ==
At the time of the events, Ecuador had been recently characterized by institutional instability. Between 1997 and 2007, Ecuador had eight presidents, and two of them had been overthrown in political unrest: Jamil Mahuad in 2000 and Lucio Gutiérrez in 2005. Since then, Correa's PAIS alliance won five consecutive elections, including two presidential elections (2006 and 2009), a referendum to modify the Constitution and a referendum to approve the new Constitution. A poll published on 15 September 2010 showed Correa had a 67% approval rating in Quito and 59% in Guayaquil.

=== Public Service Organic Law ===
The Public Service Organic Law was drafted by the executive, and was perceived by the armed forces and law enforcement as introducing cuts to their benefits. Such cuts included: the removal of Christmas bonuses, bonuses accompanying the awarding of medals, as well as service awards based on time in service. The draft generated much controversy during parliamentary debates. However, it passed through first, second and plenary rounds of parliamentary votes in the National Assembly. On 3 September, President Correa made a partial objection to the law proposal. According to an Ecuavisa report, government sources indicated that Correa considered dissolving parliament and calling for new elections due to disagreements within his own party with respect to his concerns over the new legislation. As of 30 September, after fifteen months of debate, the law proposal had not yet been finalised by the Assembly. It was argued by some that the police were ill-informed of the new measures, which were not meant to cut benefits; rather the benefits were intended to be provided by other means.

As the events developed, officials, the Latin America media, and Correa supporters expressed concern that they could follow the same course as the 2009 Honduran coup d'état in which another left-leaning Latin American president, Manuel Zelaya, was overthrown by the military during a constitutional crisis. (Correa is known as, and describes himself as, "left-wing".) The ruling government in Honduras sent a message of support for Correa after news of the crisis in Ecuador broke.

== Attack on the president ==
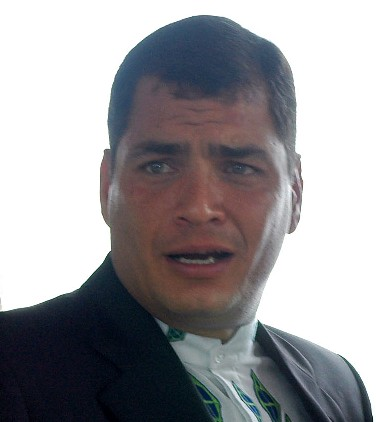
"If you want to kill the president, here he is. Kill me, if you want to. Kill me if you are brave enough!" ", President Rafael Correa shouted at the policemen.

On the morning of 30 September, members of the Ecuadorian Armed Forces and National Police occupied several barracks and set up roadblocks in nine of the country's provincial capitals to demand that special bonuses paid to the police and military. These police and armed forces occupied the National Assembly building. The Ecuadorian Air Force shut down Mariscal Sucre International Airport in Quito and José Joaquín de Olmedo International Airport in Guayaquil, forcing their closure for several hours. Police also blocked roads in Guayaquil, the country's largest city, and reported unrest in two other cities. Looters also ransacked banks, supermarkets and shopping malls in the port city of Guayaquil.

President Correa went to the police barracks in Quito where he arrived at 11:00 A.M. (GMT+5); after being ill-received – an honor guard was not assembled – he first tried to have a dialogue with the police and criticized their actions as treason to "the people and the country", but after hearing hostile police chant "Lucio presidente, Lucio presidente" he screamed "'If you want to kill the president, here he is. Kill me, if you want to. Kill me if you are brave enough!" After Correa had left the barracks, he was attacked by the police with a tear gas canister that almost hit his head. Demonstrators tried to kick his knee that had recently been operated on. Correa was walking with a cane because of the operation.

Correa was escorted to a hospital in the same compound. Police forces outside the hospital building surrounded it and kept him from leaving; a helicopter tried to evacuate him and his entourage but was prevented from landing by obstacles in the landing pad. They also arrested one member of his close protection team. La Hora Nacional however reported that two hospital employees denied it was a hostage situation, El País reported recorded dialogues between the policemen, in which they announce their intentions to kill him or put him out of office.

From the hospital, Correa declared a state of emergency, after he accused the opposition and security forces of an attempted coup and orchestrating the protests. He stated that he was declaring a five-day state of emergency in an attempt to restore order.

Reports indicated the armed forces remained loyal to the constitutional order. Correa said that a rescue operation had been ready for a few hours, but was postponed to avoid more bloodshed. Correa's supporters, urged by the country's foreign minister to rescue "their president," were stopped from meeting the president, and clashed with the police around Quito. They reportedly chanted "This is not Honduras," in reference to the 2009 coup in that country. Hundreds of Correa supporters gathered outside the National Assembly, which was seized by striking police, while Interior Minister Gustavo Jalkh met with representatives of the rebellious police.

By afternoon, protesters took control of the channels. Many attacks on journalists and photojournalists by rebellious police, have been denounced in Quito and other cities. Workers and equipment of Ecuador TV, Radio Pública, Ecuavisa, Teleamazonas, and El Comercio were attacked and several journalists were wounded. International journalists, from AFP and teleSUR, were also attacked.

=== Rescue operation ===
In the late hours of the evening, three teams of special police and army teams (GIR, GOE and army paratroopers) and elite army troops part of a force of around 500 uniformed personnel loyal to their allegiance rescued him after clashes with rebellious police forces inside and outside the hospital building. The rescue from the hospital was shown live on Ecuadorian television. Bullets hit his room during the rescue operation. Venezuelan-American lawyer Eva Golinger stated that investigators "concluded [that] coup forces were attempting to assassinate him before he could be rescued". As Correa was rescued, his armoured car was hit by four bullets but the investigation shows that the car, a Nissan Patrol, that had been used to rescue the president didn't have any impacts, and it is still unclear where the black armoured vehicle (a Ford) was when it was hit.

Correa was then taken to the Presidential Palace, where he gave a "fiery speech" to the public thanking those who supported him and came to Quito to support the "citizen's revolution and democracy in our country" and the members of the government who risked their lives in support of him. He also thanked UNASUR and the other Latin American countries that supported him.

He criticized those who attempted the coup saying: "How could they call themselves police after acting like this against the people?", and said there would not be any immunity for the perpetrators nor would there be any "negotiation under duress". He called the attackers "cowards" and claimed to have spoken to officers who were holding him hostage at the hospital and asked them two questions: Have you ever been paid this well? and have you read the law? He claimed they said they had never been better treated than through his administration and that they had not read the controversial law. When the protesters asked him to revoke the law, he answered that he did not have the power to do so and that he would leave as president or as a corpse, and in the end he left with his "head held high".

== Alleged perpetrators ==
President Correa said that "the uprising was incited for political motives" and accused former president Lucio Gutiérrez and other opposition politicians for "attempting to instigate a coup". He said that there were infiltrates from "well-known political parties" among the rebellious police. Police were also heard chanting "Lucio Gutiérrez president" while Correa spoke to them. Gutiérrez' former lawyer was reported to have been spotted amongst a crowd of officers that stormed the building of the state television ECTV and cut off the transmission.

Lucio Gutiérrez, a former president ousted by a popular uprising and leader of the opposition Sociedad Patriótica Party who had participated in the coup d'état against Jamil Mahuad, said that the only person responsible for the situation was Correa himself and his "abusive, corrupt and prepotent government". He accused President Correa of trying to divert the attention from corruption scandals affecting his government. Gutiérrez said "Is true that we want to take Correa out, but with votes, and he shall finish his term so we can defeat him in free (...) non-fraudulent election". During the incident Gutiérrez suggested the dissolution of the National Assembly as a "solution to avoid the possibility of bloodshed in the country", coinciding with the actions of the police who had taken occupation of the assembly building.

Journalist Jean-Guy Allard claimed, on Radio Del Sur, that the "coup attempt confirmed" a 2008 report by Defence Minister Javier Ponce on infiltration of the Ecuadorian police by United States intelligence agents, including funding of police equipment and operations, and payment of informers. In response to the 2008 report, US ambassador Heather Hodges stated that the US "works with" the Ecuadorian military and police "on objectives that are very important for security", including the "fight against drug trafficking." Allard also referred to former CIA agent Philip Agee's description of US involvement with the Ecuadorian police in the early 1960s. He cited his suspicion about the visit of several United States officials to Ecuador, officially "to deepen relations," during the months prior to the coup attempt was a "pretext." Pepe Escobar of Asia Times also alleged that "everyone in South America" knows of US involvement, as he cited similar reaction to the Honduran coup. Russia Today alleged a link between the School of the Americas and the attempted coup.

Venezuelan-American lawyer Eva Golinger claimed that the coup attempt was part of a systematic, US-supported plan to destabilise member states of the Bolivarian Alliance for the Americas (ALBA). She alleged that US ambassador Heather Hodges was sent to Ecuador by former US President George W. Bush "with the intention of sowing destabilization against Correa, in case the Ecuadoran president refused to subordinate himself to Washington's agenda," and that Hodges increased the budget of USAID and the NED for social and political groups that "promote US interests." Golinger claimed that certain "progressive" social groups received "financing and guidelines in order to provoke destabilising situations in the country that go beyond the natural expressions of criticism and opposition to a government." According to Golinger, USAID's 2010 budget in Ecuador $38 million. Golinger referred to the indigenous political party Pachakutik Movement's press release on 30 September asking for Correa's resignation on the grounds that his "dictatorial attitude" had generated "serious political turmoil and internal crisis." In the statement, Pachakutik leader Cléver Jiménez said that the "situation" of the police and armed forces in the coup attempt "should be understood as a just action by public servants, whose rights have been made vulnerable." Golinger alleged that Pachakutik was funded by NED and USAID and that its call for Correa's resignation and its support for the mutiny was an example of the US plans to destabilise ALBA member states. Pachakutik strongly denied having "any relationship at all with the organism known as USAID, previously NED, not today nor ever" and accused the Ecuadorian government of having accepted USAID/NED funding. Golinger responded by referring to a National Democratic Institute (NDI, one of the four institutes funded by NED) report from 2007 describing Pachakutik being trained by the NDI in "Triangle of Party Best Practices and strategic planning methodologies" as part of NDI's Latin American/Caribbean Political Party Network of over 1400 individual members, funded under NED Core Grants 2000–031, 2001–048, 2003–028, and 2004–036.

The United States government denied any involvement and deemed the accusations as unsubstantiated. The United States had already declared support for Correa through its ambassador to the Organization of American States. US Secretary of State Hillary Clinton, also expressed "full support for President Rafael Correa, and the institutions of democratic government in that country." On 5 October, Ecuadorian foreign minister Ricardo Patiño said "I firmly believe that Mr. Obama had nothing to do with this. I hope, I trust that his main authorities also didn't". Relations between the Ecuadorian and United States governments regarding the Ecuadorian police forces had been strained since 2009 when the Ecuadorian government was unhappy about United States involvement in the appointment of Ecuadorian police officials.

=== Investigations ===
On 1 October, Coronel Cesár Carrion, Quito's metropolitan police chief; Marcelo Echeverría, the provincial police commander; and Manuel E. Rivadeneira Tello, the head of the barracks where Correa was attacked, were detained. They were released the next day but barred from leaving Ecuador pending an investigation for "negligence, rebellion and attempted assassination," according to prosecutor Gonzalo Marco Freire. The School of the Americas Watch lists Rivadeneira as having trained at the SOA from 25 February to 18 April 1980, in the C-8 armed combat cadet group.

On 5 October, Fidel Araujo, a close collaborator of Lucio Gutiérrez, was detained for investigations about his role in the uprising, as TV has shown him among the rebellious police in Quito, in the early hours of the strike. Also, recorded dialogues between the policemen that surrounded the hospital where Rafael Correa was kept, were undisclosed. In them, the policemen announce their intentions to kill the President, or have him out of office.

Interior Minister Gustavo Jalkh announced the arrest of 46 police officers for alleged participation in the revolt. He claimed prosecutors had voice recordings that implicate them.

== Aftermath ==
After the day's events, four people were confirmed dead, one of whom was a university student, and the others were a police officer and two military personnel involved in the rescue operation. One-hundred and ninety-three were injured, 24 of them seriously. Forty of them were personnel of the armed forces.

Reports indicated the police were back to work the next day and Guayaquil was back to normal. The chief of police, Freddy Martinez, took responsibility, and resigned following the attacks saying "A commander shown such lack of respect by his subordinates cannot stay in charge." The government said it would not purge the police force, but were looking for those responsible who would "not be pardoned." Patricio Franco, the newly appointed police chief, asked the public to "trust the police," saying the revolt was led by a group of "foolish and crazy people who acted violently". He also stressed the role of "infiltrates".

On 1 October, Correa issued a three-day national mourning period for the dead, but did not revoke the five-day state of emergency as the country gradually returned to normality. Foreign minister Ricardo Patiño warned that the situation might not be over yet. "We cannot claim total victory. We have overcome the situation for now, but we cannot relax. The coup attempt may have roots out there, we have to find them and pull them up." Correa told UNASUR foreign ministers that "they wanted to provoke a civil war."

The media also speculated that the crisis could mean a popularity boost for Correa, who had lost some support in recent months. It also cited Correa's mixed relationship with the armed forces since taking office, and this crisis could force a more "delicate line" working with the military. Previously he won over military chiefs using wage hikes and appointments to what were considered "cushy state jobs". If the police protests blow over, Correa will likely be forced to negotiate to keep the ranks calm. However, the international media also cited Correa's popularity among the poor for his spending oil largesse on welfare programmes and a firm stance against foreign investors. He may now be forced to boost public spending and seek alternative sources of credit after Ecuador's 2008 default on about $3 billion in debt. Additionally, foreign oil companies in Ecuador have until November to sign new contracts that would boost state control on the oil industry.

On 2 October, Correa's government and his parliamentary bloc announced an agreement to modify some aspects of the Public Service Organic Law that worried the police and the Armed Forces. On 5 October, the government decreed a wage increase for the police and the armed forces. Defence Minister Javier Ponce said that the adjustment was programmed since before the crisis. The Emergency rule was extended into the week following the raid, to allow the transfer of protection of the National Assembly to the military.

== Reactions ==
=== Domestic ===
Citizens supporting Correa amassed in front of their provincial governments in a show of support.

On 30 September, the opposition Pachakutik Movement published a press release asking for Correa to resign or be dismissed by the National Assembly under Article 130.2 of the 2008 Constitution, on the grounds that his "dictatorial attitude" had generated "serious political turmoil and internal crisis". Pachakutik leader Cléver Jiménez said that he "backed the struggle of the country's public servants, including the police troops who have mobilized against the regime's authoritarian policies which are an attempt to eliminate acquired labor rights. The situation of the police and members of the Armed Forces should be understood as a just action by public servants, whose rights have been made vulnerable."

On 6 October, the Confederation of Indigenous Nationalities of Ecuador (CONAIE) and Pachakutik together issued a declaration stating "there never was any attempted coup d'etat, much less a kidnapping, but an event that responded to the uncertain political management of the government that causes popular discontent through permanent aggression, discrimination and violations of human rights consecrated in the Constitution." CONAIE and Pachakutik demanded "the constitutional suspension of the National Congress for its failure to comply with the constitutional mandate that it legislate much less audit as it is well known that all laws are approved by the president's legal minister." They "condemned the usurpation of press freedom when on 30 September all media not allied with the government was forced to broadcast government news in 'cadena nacional,' a means by which all access to information is controlled and manipulated with a version of the facts that does not inform about the real dimensions of the situation on that day in the country."

=== Supranational bodies ===
Secretary-General of the United Nations Ban Ki-moon expressed concern.

The Permanent Council of the Organization of American States unanimously approved a resolution supporting Correa's government and asked all the stakeholders to avoid "exacerbating" the political instability. Ecuadorian ambassador María Isabel Salvador said that the events "cannot, in any way, be considered as simple union acts or public protests". She also said Correa was in touch with his ministers.

The European Union's Foreign Policy chief called for law and order to be respected.

UNASUR

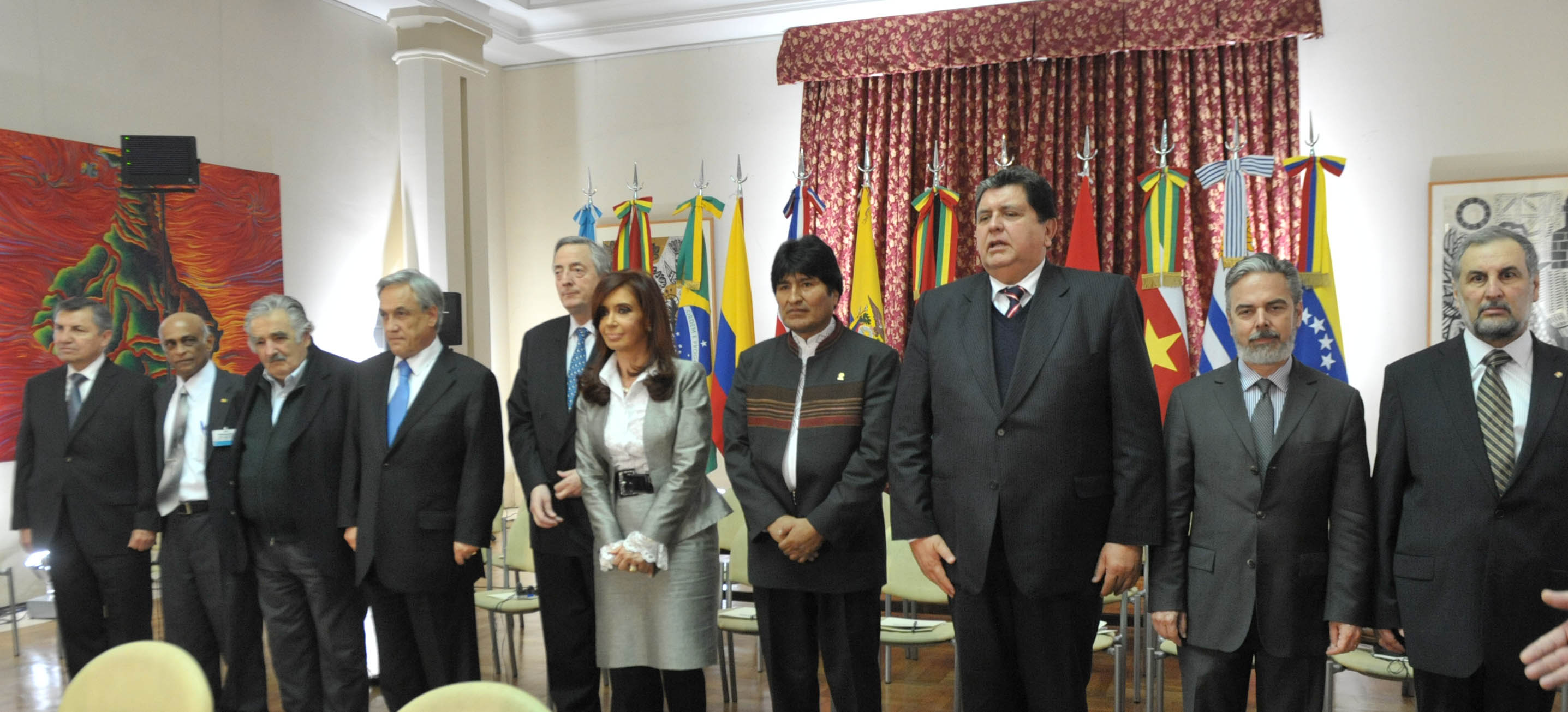
UNASUR Member States presidents and representatives at the Buenos Aires emergency summit. Juan Manuel Santos (Colombia) and Hugo Chávez (Venezuela) were in flight to Buenos Aires, and arrived hours later.

The Secretary General of UNASUR, Néstor Kirchner, said "South America cannot tolerate that corporative interests threaten and put pressure on democratically elected governments for fear of losing undue privileges". An emergency summit was held on the same night of the events, 30 September, in Buenos Aires, Argentina, attended by UNASUR member state Presidents Evo Morales, Sebastián Piñera, José Mujica, Juan Manuel Santos, Hugo Chávez, Alan García, and host (in the absence of the President Pro-Tempore Correa) Cristina Kirchner, along with representatives of Brazil, Paraguay, Guyana and Suriname. There were two notable absentees: Luiz Inácio Lula da Silva did not attend because of the impending Brazilian general elections; and Fernando Lugo was absent because he was undertaking chemotherapy.

A statement was issued condemning the coup attempt, reaffirming the regional compromise with democratic institutions, peace, rule of law, constitutional order and human rights as means to regional integration, and announcing the adoption of a Democratic Clause as an additional protocol to the Unasur Constitutive Treaty at the next Head of State summit in Guyana on 26 November.

It was established that, in the event of further attempts, immediate and concrete steps would be taken, such as the closure of borders, suspension of commerce, air traffic, energy, services, and other supplies. It was also decided that the Foreign Ministers of the South American countries travel to Quito on the morning of 1 October.

=== International ===
Venezuelan president Hugo Chávez condemned the coup attempt, and stated that he and other South American leaders were "mobilizing to reject the coup".

Chilean president Sebastián Piñera also declared "absolute and total support for President Correa", and called for all democratic countries in South America to support Ecuadorian democracy. The Chilean ambassador to Ecuador, later claimed that the events had "definitely not been a coup d'état".

Argentina, Bolivia, Brazil, Colombia, Chile, Mexico, Uruguay, Paraguay, Peru and Spain also expressed full support for Correa's government.

Argentina's Foreign Affairs Minister, Héctor Timerman, said "Latin American democracies will not allow a repeat in Ecuador of the coup in Honduras." Former Argentine president Eduardo Duhalde called the events a "coup d'etat".

The ruling government in Honduras also expressed its support for Ecuador. The ruling Honduran government is not recognized by Ecuador on the grounds of the coup in Honduras in 2009 against Manuel Zelaya. It condemned "any action that violates the constitutional order" in Ecuador. "Honduras, its people and its government expresses its unqualified support for the democratic institutions of the Republic of Ecuador and advocate return to civic normality," said the Honduran Foreign Ministry said in a statement. Support from Honduras, observed CNN, "came a little over a year after a military-led coup toppled the democratically elected president there."

Colombia said it had shut its border with Ecuador in solidarity with Correa.

Peru shut its border with Ecuador due to unrest, with President Alan García saying it would not reopen "until democratic authority is restored."

Iran's ambassador in Ecuador, Majid Salehi, said he was monitoring the situation and that it "fully supported Correa's legal government throughout the incident." He also added that Iran's President Mahmoud Ahmadinejad and Foreign Minister Manouchehr Mottaki talked to Correa later. In the conversation, Correa stressed that ties between the two states were strong and "certain countries were seeking to damage Iran-Ecuador relations" but emphasised a will to further strengthen ties after saying "Ecuador would not allow any country to interfere in its foreign relations". Ahmadinejad, in turn, welcomed their growing ties, saying "Iran and Ecuador enjoy deep, brotherly relations".

The United States declared support for Correa through its ambassador to the Organization of American States. US Secretary of State Hillary Clinton expressed "full support for President Rafael Correa, and the institutions of democratic government in that country." On 5 October, Ecuadorian foreign minister Ricardo Patiño said "I firmly believe that Mr. Obama had nothing to do with this. I hope, and trust that neither his (immediate subordinates) did.

== Academic analysis ==
On 4 October, New York University professor of history Greg Grandin stated that "it's still early to tell exactly what happened" and in his initial analysis said, "the government has made a lot of, I think, accurate accusations that it was not just a spontaneous social protest against austerity. It was too coordinated. It happened simultaneously in a number of cities, a number of barracks. Sectors of the air force joined in immediately. It seems like there have been sectors that have been dissatisfied with Correa within the military. And certainly, a past president, Lucio Gutiérrez, ... immediately came out and called Correa illegitimate and called for him to step down."

== Asylum in Czech Republic ==
On 2 July 2012, the Czech Republic gave political asylum to lawyer Pablo Guerrero Martinez, who, with more than 111 people, was accused of sabotage and terrorism by the facts raised in the public channel Ecuador TV on 30 September 2010. He became well-known together with other 12 persons prosecuted by the government with the name of Los Trece Pablo Guerrero Martinez, lawyer, journalist, activist and defender of freedom of expression in his country, was a candidate for Concentración de Fuerzas Populares in the presidential election of 2009. The Czech government textually said that: "Criminal proceedings that his country is continuing against the applicant and twelve others have all the elements of a political process, and the penalty he could receive is unrelated to the seriousness of the fault".

== See also ==
- 2000 Ecuadorean coup d'état
- 2002 Venezuelan coup d'état attempt
- 2004 Haitian coup d'état
- 2009 Honduran coup d'état
