= Erika Sylva Charvet =

Ecuadorian politician

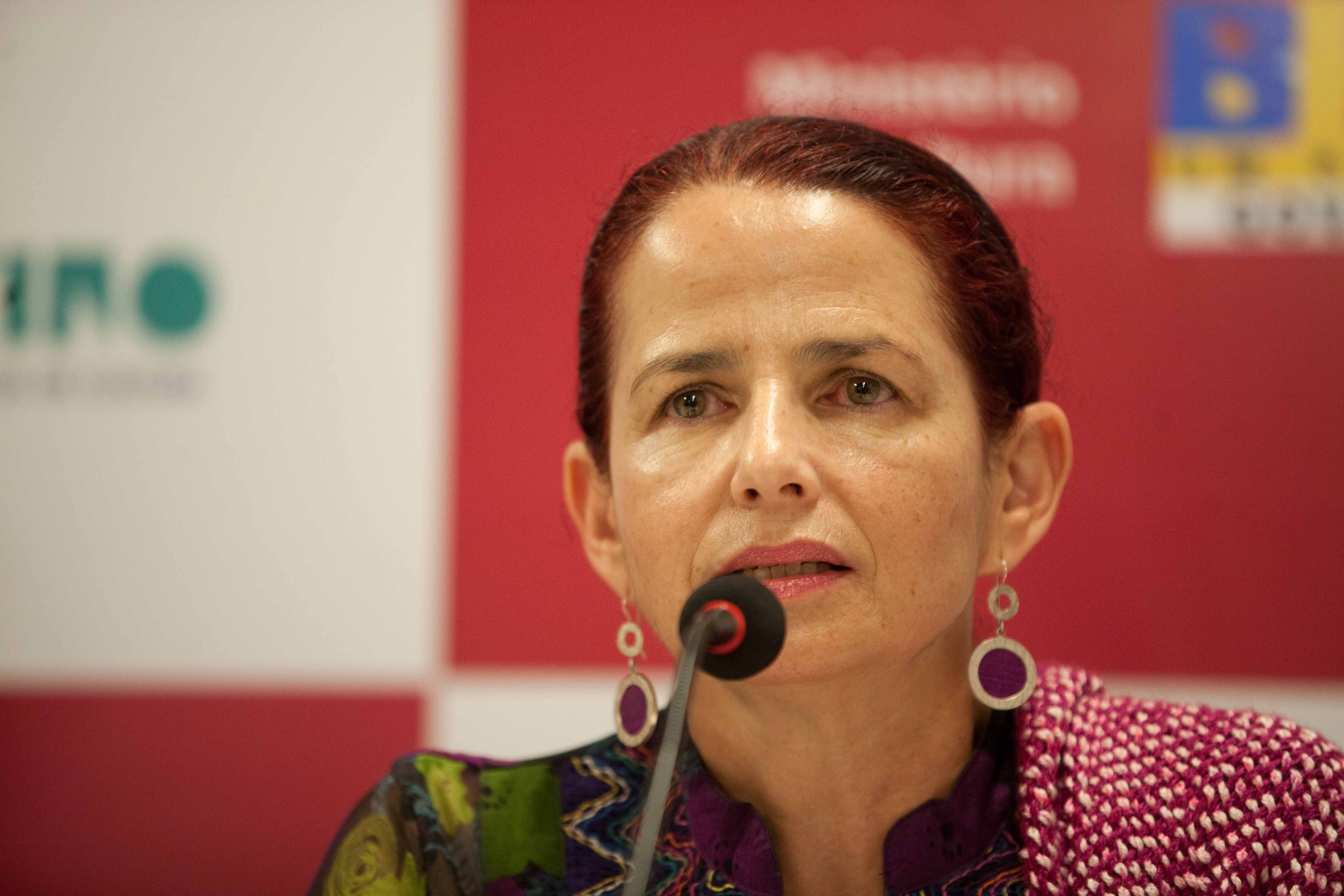
- Erika Sylva Charvet during a meeting on 25 May 2010.

Minister of Culture
- In office 21 April 2010 – 9 May 2013
- President: Rafael Correa
- Preceded by: Ramiro Noriega
- Succeeded by: Francisco Velasco

Personal details
- Born: 24 November 1951 (age 74) Quito, Ecuador
- Education: Pontificia Universidad Católica del Ecuador; Universidad Central del Ecuador; Facultad Latinoamericano de Ciencias Sociales

Erika Sylva Charvet (born 24 November 1951) is an Ecuadorian politician who was Minister of Culture from 21 April 2010 until 9 May 2013.

== Personal life ==
Erika Sylva was born in Quito. She is married. Her husband has an academic background like Sylva and works at the Universidad Central del Ecuador. She speaks her native Spanish and English.

== Education and career history ==
She studied Literature in the Pontificia Universidad Católica del Ecuador and afterwards she got her licentiate at the Universidad Central del Ecuador in Sociology and Political Science. Later on she got a postgraduate degree in Political Science by the Facultad Latinoamericano de Ciencias Sociales in Mexico, writing her thesis about the surge of natural cultural identity in Ecuador. She spent most of her career as an academic researcher at several universities and institutions, and she holds an interest in gender issues.

== Minister of Culture ==
On 21 April 2010 Sylva joined the cabinet of Rafael Correa as Minister of Culture, replacing Ramiro Noriega. At the ceremony of taking office she declared that one of her main objectives would be to promote cultural change among Ecuadorians. She stated: "It is necessary to promote cultural change, new values, a new vision of who we are, to fight racism, elitism, and to promote interculturalism among Ecuadorians, both women and men". In March 2012 it was announced that Sylva would start a project to support a culture of peace in the border area with Colombia. The goal of the project was to activate social cohesion and fight the social disintegration coming from the conflict-ridden Colombian side of the border. In June 2012 she received the decoration of "Honoring Honor" by the José Martí Council for World Solidarity, a project ratified by UNESCO whose objectives are, among others, to acknowledge and consolidate Latin American roots. She got her decoration for strengthening the historic ties between the peoples of Ecuador and Cuba.

In a document by Sylva and Rafael Quintero, Undersecretary of Foreign Affairs, it was claimed that the Confederation of Indigenous Nationalities of Ecuador (CONAIE) has been conspiring against President Rafael Correa since 2009 to destabilize the constituent process of Ecuador. The authors furthermore claimed that CONAIE was working together with extreme right and financial help from institutions in the United States. Furthermore, it was also claimed that the indigenous movement together with the teachers union has become part of the corporatist political left. This would express itself by defending private interests and being neoliberal in nature. The CONAIE however claims to fight against these very neoliberal causes themselves. Relations between the Ecuadorian government and CONAIE have been tense since the 2010 Ecuador crisis.

On 9 May 2013 Francisco Velasco replaced Sylva as Minister of Culture. By a reshuffle of the ministries the Ministry of Culture joined with the Ministry of Heritage.
