= Pablo Guerrero Martinez =

Pablo Guerrero Martinez (born 3 November 1967 in Ecuador),

is the son of José Guerrero Bermudes and grandson of Julio Martinez Acosta, two well-known personalities in the history of Ecuador.

After a degree in Public and Social Science, he became a Doctor of Jurisprudence and Lawyer of the Courts of the Republic. He is now a lawyer, journalist, activist, and participant in Ecuador political life. He is well known because of his candidacy for Concentración de Fuerzas Populares in the presidential election of 2009 and because of his involvement in the attempted 2010 Ecuadorian coup d'état against the government of Rafael Correa and the subsequent crisis in Ecuador. He is one of the several dissidents that received asylum in Czech Republic; with him, there is also his brother, José Luis Guerrero Martinez.

== Pablo Guerrero Martinez case ==
Ecuador went through a constitutional crisis in September 2010, preceded by the issuance of a new Organic Law of the Public Sector.

Dr. Pablo Guerrero Martínez, at the time those events occurred, kept for nearly a year a television program called Ubícate that aired nightly on Telesucesos and went to the Police headquarters for information. While the President Rafael Correa was in the hospital, where he received first aid after the use of gas product, Dr. Guerrero was invited to have an interview, never aired, in which he denounced the chain communication national government' willing untruthfully, because the President was not kidnapped. The day after these events, a preliminary investigation with the charge of terrorism began against Dr. Pablo Martinez and other 12 people, who are still on a criminal trial for sabotage and terrorism. They became known as Los Trece (Los Trece).

Dr. Guerrero managed to escape to Europe where he requested political asylum in the Czech Republic and granted the status of political refugee.

The Czech government textually said:

The administrative authority, after having collected and examined all the material that formed the basis for decisions within the framework of this administrative proceeding, has concluded that the criminal proceedings being conducted against the applicant and twelve other persons at home has obvious signs of political persecution and impending doom does not reflect the seriousness of the fault. What is also clear from the above is that the applicant for international protection at home was very active politically and was a publicly known personality was found in opposition to the current president. Taking into account the information gathered by the administrative authority that became the target of criminal prosecution is justified by the very high probability of their political activities, this confirms the above opinion of the Ministry of Foreign Affairs of the Czech Republic, which indicates in his report that according to available information the government and the president influence the decisions of the Ecuadorian courts. The victims of court proceedings are handled journalists, teachers and intellectuals.

Pablo Guerrero currently lives in Prague where he maintains an active involvement in academic forums to advocate for human rights.
