= La Hojilla =

- Genre: Talk show
- Starring: Mario Silva and Jorge Amorín
- Country of origin: Venezuela
- Original language: Spanish

Production
- Production location: Caracas

Original release
- Network: Venezolana de Televisión
- Release: June 21, 2004 – 2008
- Release: 2009 – May 21, 2013
- Release: February 23, 2015 – March 13, 2026

Related
- Con El Mazo Dando

La Hojilla (English: The Razorblade) is a Venezuelan television programme. It is transmitted daily on weekdays at 11pm on Venezolana de Televisión. It is hosted by Mario Silva and Jorge Amorín. It is also broadcast on Radio Nacional de Venezuela.

== Programme ==
The Economist discussed Silva in 2011; Silva rejected the allegations. In February 2012, allegations aired on La Hojilla against opposition candidate Henrique Capriles Radonski gained international coverage. Capriles rejected the allegations.

== Format ==
The show first aired on June 21, 2004. Initially, it featured journalists Eileen Padrón and Néstor Francia. Both later left in 2006 to start their own show called La réplica. La hojilla addresses political issues in Venezuela and supports the government of Nicolás Maduro. The host conducts interviews, analyses, and reports. The show has also featured local personalities such as journalist and lawyer Eva Golinger, comedians Joselo and Koke Corona, singer Paul Gillman, political activist Lina Ron, the former president of the National Assembly of Venezuela, and former foreign minister and current president of Venezuela Nicolás Maduro, as well as former Venezuelan president Hugo Chávez, among others.

== Background ==
On September 9, 2008, Mario Silva announced the temporary suspension of the show to devote time to his campaign for the governorship of Carabobo state. The show was relaunched in January 2009 after his electoral defeat. The program ended its broadcasts on VTV in 2013, following Nicolás Maduro's victory in that year's presidential elections. President Nicolás Maduro and deputy Diosdado Cabello announced the return of Mario Silva to Venezolana de Televisión with the show La hojilla on Saturday, February 21, 2015, and has since been broadcast every Saturday at 7:00 pm.

== Criticisms ==
La hojilla has been the subject of criticism from both Venezuelan opposition politicians and some personalities sympathetic to Hugo Chávez's project. Critics have described the show as "vulgar" and ""sensationalist".

== See also ==
- Con El Mazo Dando
