= Los Trece =

Los Trece (The Thirteen) are a group of people who were prosecuted in Ecuador on charges of terrorism. The accusation was made after the events of the crisis of the 30 September 2010.

== Who are they ==
In Ecuador there is a group of 13 democratic activists who are accused of "terrorism" and ”orchestrating a coup against Correa” on September 30, 2010. The group is composed of people from a wide spectrum of society (academics, professionals, students, religious, military), which include attorney Pablo Guerrero Martinez, student leader Maria Alejandra Cevallos and former Colonel Galo Monteverde, among others.

What Los Trece did was to protest peacefully for freedom of expression and awareness among citizens and against the adoption of the new Law on Public Communication, also known as the Ley mordaza global (also known as Gag Law and Citizens’ Security Law). This resembles the one approved by Hugo Chavez in Venezuela, and ended years ago with the closure of several major media outlets. The most emblematic case is that of RCTV.

The Ecuadorian Ley mordaza, which nevertheless was finally approved in June 2013, has already claimed its first victims among the media. The latest is the magazine Vanguardia, which for more than seven years was engaged in journalistic research topics. This has just been disabled.

Cases like this are several. Thus some international organizations have drawn attention to what is happening in Ecuador on freedom of expression, including the Inter-American Commission on Human Rights (IACHR), the Inter American Press Association (IAPA), Human Rights Watch (HRW), Freedom House, among others.

== What is exactly the case with “Los Trece”? ==
The September 30, 2010, during the uprising of police in Quito Regiment, which ended with a dozen dead and several injured and arrested, Ecuador channels chained to avoid to make public the details of the events. Parallel, and as every Thursday, that day “Los Trece” group carried out a peaceful march to protest against the Ley Mordaza. As they were near the channel state (ECTV), they decided to go to its site to ask to allow all media to freely disseminate the truth of the facts and not just have the government version. A confusing situation occurred when the activists entered to the channel as authorities have authorized only 5 of them, while some argued that allowed entry to 13. The explosion in the channel was chaotic, a fact that was used by the government to divert attention from the facts of the 30S. From that moment a fierce propaganda campaign was launched against ”Los Trece”, which would be classified as terrorists, saboteurs and later accused of ”boycott” of wanting to ”take the channel” and finally “attempted coup”.

== Freedom of expression under threat ==
Rafael Correa has mounted an apparatus to suppress freedom of expression in order to control opponents and followed emerging as the only possible future for their country (biased information, need quote to describe a politically oriented opinion).

Correa maintained a defiant attitude towards the media who question and made it clear that his government considers enemies. “From now on we don’t send official news to mercantilist media because we do not have (…) benefit the business of six families in this country” Rafael Correa ordered to the National Communications Secretary Fernando Alvarado. By “mercantilist” the President was referring to the private media in Ecuador, to which also often referred to as “corrupt”, “sinister” or “mediocre”.

The president also announced recently that public officials are prohibited from giving statements to private media and that these pre-election months of February 2013, no media can nominate presidential candidates or post pictures that may help or hurt them. But these are only the most recent obstacles that Correa has put in the way of the media since coming to power in 2007. In addition to restricting the contents of the private media, “the government has built one of the largest conglomerates in state media in the region, with 15 radio stations, television, print media and news agency that serve to broaden the point of view of the administration, “he said Semana Carlos Lauria, American coordinator for the Committee to Protect Journalists. As if the communication network is not enough, Correa chains frequently on radio and television to reach unrivaled citizens. According to El País of Madrid, until May 2011 the president had accumulated 1,025 brands and 280 Saturday programs, called City Link.

Correa channels have the distinction of appearing in very specific moments. As the Report of the Special Rapporteur for Freedom of Expression published in 2011 explains, ”there have been repeated government disruptions of critical journalistic programs through radio and television presidential channels broadcast the official message only at the station where the information is issued or review questioned.” For three days, for example, Correa interrupted the TV show The Breakfast 24 Hours, hosted by Maria Josefa Coronel, who had done interviews that questioned certain constitutional reforms that tried to push belt. So did over a program that had Ecuavisa view guest former president Lucio Gutierrez. The government's message lasted about ten minutes and went on to criticize this administration. Raul Vallejo, Ecuadorian ambassador to Colombia, explains “If you say this, we put a string and say ‘Lord, you said that such a thing was so, it is not true, here is shown ‘It’s a debate.”

While stringing the media is legal, the report of the Special Rapporteur states that ” the exercise of this power, however, is not absolute. Governments information transmitted citizenship (…) must be that strictly necessary to meet urgent needs clear information on matters of genuine public interest.” Cesar Ricaurte, director of the Ecuadorian Fundamedios NGOs, the media says ”Correa devotes its weekly reports of four to five hours to attack journalists and display photos like the most wanted criminals.”

Jaime Ugalde, editor of Ediasa group, was attacked in the street by pro-government supporters after the weekly schedule of Correa, which had strongly criticized journalists and media officials. For three years the government has tried to pass a Communications Law that would expand legal chains and spread them any message. The government presented the project as a means to democratize the media, but according to Lauria, actually it “has proposed creating a regulatory board with broad powers to control the press and determine penalties to alleged violations.” While the Communications Act still stand by, the president has decided to seek other ways to restrict freedom of expression. Correa has been dedicated to regulate news content with legal maneuvers that let you punish expeditiously and discreetly critical of his administration. The case of the magazine Vanguardia is an example: in 2010 the police raided their offices and confiscated 40 computers Quito to run an alleged debt of $14,000 for the lease of the premises, maneuver repeated, increased in July 2012. And Correa sued to demand compensation of ten million dollars a director Juan Carlos Calderón for having written the book Big Brother, in which he denounced corruption in the presidential family. That demand was recalled to join the legal action for libel against the publisher and a columnist for the Guayaquil newspaper El Universo, Correa decided to ‘ forgive ‘ to international pressure.

Although the crime of contempt is not internationally accepted, in Ecuador ruled a similar figure: the slanderous libel, punishable under the Criminal Code with fines and imprisonment. According to Semana said Asdrubal Aguiar, former judge of the Inter-American Court of Human Rights, “States that are part of the OAS are required to adjust the domestic law to the requirements of the Convention. Which state do not want to set in plane rapist international obligations.” But Correa has sued more than 25 people and institutions in the past four years for libel and press offenses. ”Democratically, what legitimacy your business has a media imposes its view, against a government that has been elected by vote ?” Vallejo Ambassador asks, repeating the words of President Correa. For the government, the votes that elected him give superiority to citizens and carte blanche to act as they see necessary. As much as management approval, 74 percent of Ecuadorians also rejects Correa's attacks on the media. Given this figure disapproval, Vallejo says that ”perhaps disagree on the way he says things, maybe people expected to be a little more friendly. That does not mean there is no press freedom in Ecuador”.

== Also with citizens ==
But even spoken at the polls, citizens rarely manifested in mass in favor of freedom of expression. According to Pachano, this also has a historical explanation: ”Ecuador does not have the experience of living under a dictatorship and not know what is the suppression of freedoms as outsiders see these issues as a problem of journalists or newspapers owners, and not the society itself.” Experience also shows that the problem is far from being one of the journalists. On several occasions the president has ordered to arrest citizens for speaking out against him or his government. In 2011 Marcos Sovenis shouted ”fascist” when he walked Babahoyo Correa. As reported Sovenis seven bodyguards of President put him in a van, assaulted and threatened. Ponce also insulted Germán Correa was detained for 72 hours and threatened with imprisonment up to 30 days. The case of Irma Parra is even more drastic: she was detained for hours by making the gesture of ‘no’ to the caravan President, days before proposed by Correa referendum, in which those opposed to the query would vote ‘no’. The President justified the detention of Parra as needed to respect the dignity of the head of government. Despite the evidence, the government claims that the country has no such problems of freedom. Both the Secretary of the Presidency, Gustavo Jalkh, as the National Communications Secretary Fernando Alvarado, abruptly refused to talk to WEEK. On behalf of his government, Ambassador Vallejo says that ”In Ecuador there is considerable freedom of expression. As wide that tell the president whatever comes to mind.”

And Attacks on President Rafael Correa began months before the 2013 elections, in which he sought reelection. Critics raised concerns about his government’s relationship with the media, including policies they viewed as restrictive, as well as the expansion of state-supported communication outlets. Supporters, however, argued these measures were intended to counterbalance private media influence. Correa maintained a strong and visible campaign presence, while opposition candidates worked to increase their visibility and present alternative policy proposals ahead of the February vote.

Correa does not hide who wants to follow the footsteps of his friend Hugo Chavez to remain in power indefinitely. Worse, seems unwilling to correct their actions, more similar to the procedures of the 19th-century caudillos that democracy policies consistent with the 21st century.

== Beyond its borders ==
”As if the repeated harassment of journalists and advocates in Ecuador were not enough, Correa has tried to export their policies internationally, trying to subtract powers of the Special Rapporteur for Freedom of Expression, precisely because this important body has criticized publicly and reason, the questionable record of his government,“ said José Miguel Vivanco Semana, director of the Americas Division of Human Rights Watch.
