= Public Service Organic Law (Ecuador 2010) =

Proposed legislation in Ecuador

The Ecuadoran 2010 Public Service Organic Law ((in Spanish) Ley orgánica del servicio público) was on 30 September 2010 a draft law that intended to regulate the Ecuadoran public service, by creating a standardised base for the payment of compensation to civil servants. The draft has gone through several constitutional steps to becoming a law. As of 2 October 2010, it had not yet become a law. The law was one of the elements in the 2010 Ecuador coup d'état attempt.

== Important and/or controversial elements of the law ==
Some police officers felt that the law negatively affected their labor rights.

== Legal progress of the law project ==
President Rafael Correa proposed the law on 2 July 2010. The law passed through first and second parliamentary readings and a plenary approval. President Correa's response on 3 September was that he made a partial objection to the law proposal. As of 2 October 2010, the law had not yet reached a final status.

== Relation to the attempted coup d'état ==
The law was claimed by participants in the 2010 coup d'état attempt against Correa to be the reason for the attempted coup d'état.
