= Júlio Martins =

Júlio Martins may refer to:

- Júlio César Oliveira Martins, (born 1983) Brazilian football midfielder
- Júlio César Martins, (born 1978) Brazilian football goalkeeper

== See also ==
- Julio Martínez (disambiguation), Spanish equivalent
