= Nikolas Kozloff =

American academic, author and photojournalist (born 1969)

- Born: March 26, 1969 (age 57); New York, New York
- Education: Oxford University

Nikolas Kozloff is an American academic, author and photojournalist. He currently writes for Al-Jazeera and has also been featured on BBC, CNN, National Public Radio, PBS' Charlie Rose show, The Daily Show and the pro-Bolivarian Revolution website Venezuelanalysis.com.

== Personal life and education ==
Kozloff is the single child of Max and Joyce Kozloff. His mother Joyce is an artist and feminist, while his father Max was a photographer, critic and historian. The family is not religious but has stated that they recognize their Jewish culture.

Kozloff studied in Britain at Oxford University and received a doctorate in Latin American history from the university.

== Works ==
An expert on South American affairs, Kozloff formerly worked for the Council on Hemispheric Affairs.

Kozloff's book Hugo Chávez : Oil, Politics and the Challenge to the United States was described as "generally positive in its treatment of" Chávez and his Bolivarian Revolution by Marxist magazine Political Affairs. A book review in The New York Times described the book's analysis as "essentially Marxist" filled with "new-lefty rhetoric" that was an "admiring study of Mr. Chávez", and quoted it describing Chávez as a "potentially dangerous enemy to the United States".

Kozloff also founded the Revolutionary Handbook, described as "a project which aims to inform discussion about how to bring about non-violent revolutionary change" that was influenced "by the Occupy Wall Street Movement". He has also written about Ukraine and East-West relations.

== Publications ==
=== Books ===
- Kozloff, Nikolas (2004). Territories, Commodities and Knowledges: Latin American Environmental Histories in the Nineteenth and Twentieth Centuries (1st. ILAS paperback ed.). London, U.K.: Institute of Latin American Studies. ISBN 1900039575.
- Kozloff, Nikolas (2006). Hugo Chávez : oil, politics and the challenge to the United States (1st. P. Macmillan paperback ed.). New York, N.Y.: Palgrave Macmillan. ISBN 1403984093.
- Kozloff, Nikolas (2008). Revolution! : South America and the rise of the new left (1st ed.). New York: Palgrave Macmillan. ISBN 978-0230600577.
- Kozloff, Nikolas (2010). No rain in the Amazon : how South America's climate change affects the entire planet (1st ed.). New York: Palgrave Macmillan. ISBN 978-0230614765.
- Kozloff, Nikolas (2012). Post Academic Stress Disorder (1st. CreateSpace paperback ed.). Scotts Valley, California: Amazon CreateSpace. ISBN 9781466207042.
- Kozloff, Nikolas (2016). Ukraine's Revolutionary Ghosts (1st. CreateSpace paperback ed.). Scotts Valley, California: Amazon CreateSpace. ISBN 978-1523413126.
