= Con El Mazo Dando =

- Genre: Talk show
- Starring: Diosdado Cabello
- Country of origin: Venezuela
- Original language: Spanish

Production
- Production locations: Caracas and various locations in Venezuela

Original release
- Network: Venezolana de Televisión; TVes
- Release: 10 February 2014 – 18 February 2026

Related
- Nos Vemos en la Radio, La Hojilla, Zurda Konducta

Con El Mazo Dando (English: Going at it with the Club) is a Venezuelan television programme. It is transmitted every Wednesdays at 7pm on Venezolana de Televisión and TVes. It is hosted by Diosdado Cabello. Its sister broadcast Nos Vemos en la Radio (English: See You On The Radio) is also broadcast on Radio Nacional de Venezuela.

== History ==
On 17 February 2014, during the protests in Venezuela, Cabello warned in the program that "no opposition march will enter the Libertador Municipality, they will not pass!," adding that "it is a territory of peace" and ensuring that opposition protesters would not bring "violence" to the municipality.

In 2016, after the opposition handed over to the National Electoral Council the signatures collected to convene a recall referendum of President Nicolás Maduro, Cabello expressed on 4 May in the program that the directors of public bodies they signed were to leave.

In 2017, Cabello presented a video on his program in which the violinist and activist Wuilly Arteaga was heard supporting the government of Nicolás Maduro. Wuilly reported that he was forced to record clandestinely every day without being able to take off his clothes and that the statements were manipulated.

=== Golpe Azul ===
On 12 February 2015, Libertador Municipality Mayor Jorge Rodríguez during a special broadcast, denounced the participants of an alleged attempt planned by aviation general Oswaldo Hernández, who was convicted in May 2014 along with nine other military personnel for the crimes of rebellion and against military decorum.

National Assembly president Diosdado Cabello announced the arrests of eight people in Aragua by officials of the Bolivarian National Intelligence Service (SEBIN) and the seizure of various equipment, including a computer with information on the tactical objectives of the coup group. He also showed maps allegedly located on the computer equipment of the protagonists of Golpe Azul, where buildings appeared in Caracas that were marked as tactical objectives such as the Miraflores Palace, the Public Ministry of Venezuela, the Caracas mayor's office, the Ministry of Defense headquarters, the Ministry of Interior, Justice and Peace building, the Supreme Tribunal of Justice (TSJ), the National Electoral Council (CNE), the Directorate General of Military Counterintelligence (DGCIM) and offices of Telesur.

Foro Penal declared that the accused suspects were political prisoners and that they were convicted without evidence, and its director Alfredo Romero described the sentence as arbitrary.

== Intimidation and incrimination ==
In this program, Cabello talks about the government's view on many political issues and presents accusations against the opposition. The Inter-American Commission on Human Rights (IACHR) has expressed concerns about how the program has intimidated people that went to the IACHR denouncing the government. Some Venezuelan commentators have compared the use of illegally recorded private conversations on programs such as Cabello's to the practices in place in the East Germany as shown in the film The Life of Others.

Amnesty International has denounced the way in which Cabello has revealed details on the travel arrangements of two human rights defenders in his program and how he routinely shows state monitoring of people that may disagree with the government.

In 2022, Amnesty International released a report, along with the Venezuelan NGOs Center for Defenders and Justice (CDJ) and Foro Penal, identifying over 300 stigmatization events between January 2019 to June 2021. The report showed a coordination between stigmatization and repression against people critical or uncomfortable for the government, including Con el Mazo Dando as one of the stigmatization tools to arrest arbitrarily and one of the outlets where hate messages against Venezuelans were most frequently repeated before their arrests take place, along with the pro-government digital portals 'Misión Verdad' and 'Lechuguinos'.

=== Law against Hatred ===
Cabello has been accused by Venezuelan public of inciting hatred against opponents through the program, as he is frequently seen accusing and incriminating Venezuelan opposition activists and citizens, as well as international personalities, with alleged coup plans and/or terrorists against the government of Nicolás Maduro. Since the controversial Law against Hatred was sanctioned by the 2017 National Constituent Assembly, several sectors of Venezuelan society questioned whether such a law would be applied to Cabello for inciting hatred in its program. However, to date the defendants have been only opponents.

== See also ==
- La Hojilla
