= Max Kozloff =

American art historian, art critic and photographer (1933–2025)

- Born: June 21, 1933; Chicago, Illinois, U.S.
- Died: April 6, 2025 (aged 91); New York City, U.S.
- Spouse: Joyce Kozloff (m. 1967)
- Children: Nikolas Kozloff

Academic background
- Education: New York University Institute of Fine Arts; University of Chicago

Academic work
- Discipline: History of art
- Institutions: School of Visual Arts; California Institute of the Arts; New York University
- Website: www.maxkozloff.com

Maxwell Kozloff (June 21, 1933 – April 6, 2025) was an American art historian, art critic of modern art, and photographer. He was art editor at The Nation, and executive editor of Artforum. His essay American Painting During the Cold War was of particular importance to the criticism on American Abstract Expressionism.

Kozloff received a Guggenheim Fellowship in 1968 and an Infinity Award for Writing from the International Center of Photography in 1990.

== Early life and education ==
Kozloff was born in Chicago, Illinois, on June 21, 1933. He graduated from the University of Chicago in 1953. Between 1954 and 1956 he served in the U.S. Army, before returning to the University of Chicago for his M.A. degree in 1958. He joined New York University's Institute of Fine Arts in 1959 to pursue a Ph.D. degree, and was subsequently awarded a Fulbright Fellowship for 1962–1963.

== Career ==
Kozloff began his career with a teaching position at New York University (NYU), and joined The Nation as art critic in 1961, where he worked until 1968, and Art International.

In 1964, he left NYU without a degree and began working at Artforum as an associate editor. In 1965 he received an Ingram Merrill Foundation Fellowship, and in 1966, received the Frank Jewett Mather Award for art criticism from the College Art Association of America. He became an Artforum contributing editor in 1967 and rose to become its executive editor between 1975 and 1977. Meanwhile in 1976, he became an art photographer, and in the following years held numerous shows and became a photography critic.

Kozloff taught at several universities and institutions throughout his career. Some of his teaching activities include the University of Chicago's Downtown Center (1958–59), Cooper Union in New York (1959–60), Washington Square College at New York University (1960–61), and a workshop on Art Criticism for the American Federation of Arts in New York (1965).

Kozloff also taught at Queens College, City University of New York (1968–69), Indiana University (1970), California Institute of the Arts in Burbank (1971), the University of New Mexico in Albuquerque (1976 and 1985), and Yale University (1978 and 2005). In addition, he taught at the Chicago Art Institute (1981), Philadelphia College of Art (1983), University of California, San Diego (1984), University of California, Los Angeles (1988), and the School of Visual Arts in New York's Masters Program in Photography and Related Media (1989–2000).

== Personal life and death ==
Kozloff married the artist Joyce Blumberg in 1967. They had a son called Nikolas.

In 1968, he signed the "Writers and Editors War Tax Protest" pledge, vowing to refuse tax payments in protest against the Vietnam War.

Kozloff died from Parkinson's disease in New York City, on April 6, 2025, at the age of 91.

== Publications ==
- Jasper Johns, Abrams (1972).
- Cubism/Futurism (1973).
- Photography & fascination: Essays (1979).
- The privileged eye (1987). ISBN 0-8263-0891-0
- Leon Levinstein: the moment of exposure. National Gallery of Canada, 1995. ISBN 0-88884-640-1.
- Cultivated Impasses: Essays on the Waning of the Avant-Garde, 1964–1975 (2000).
- New York: Capital of Photography (2002). ISBN 0-300-09445-0.
- The Theatre of the Face: Portrait Photography Since 1900 Phaidon, 2007. ISBN 978-0-7148-4372-8.
- Vermeer: A Study (2011). Rome: Contrasto. ISBN 978-88-6965-279-0.

== Awards ==
- 1968: Guggenheim Fellowship from the John Simon Guggenheim Memorial Foundation, New York City
- 1990: Infinity Award for Writing from the International Center of Photography, New York City
