= Cléver Jiménez =

Ecuadorian politician

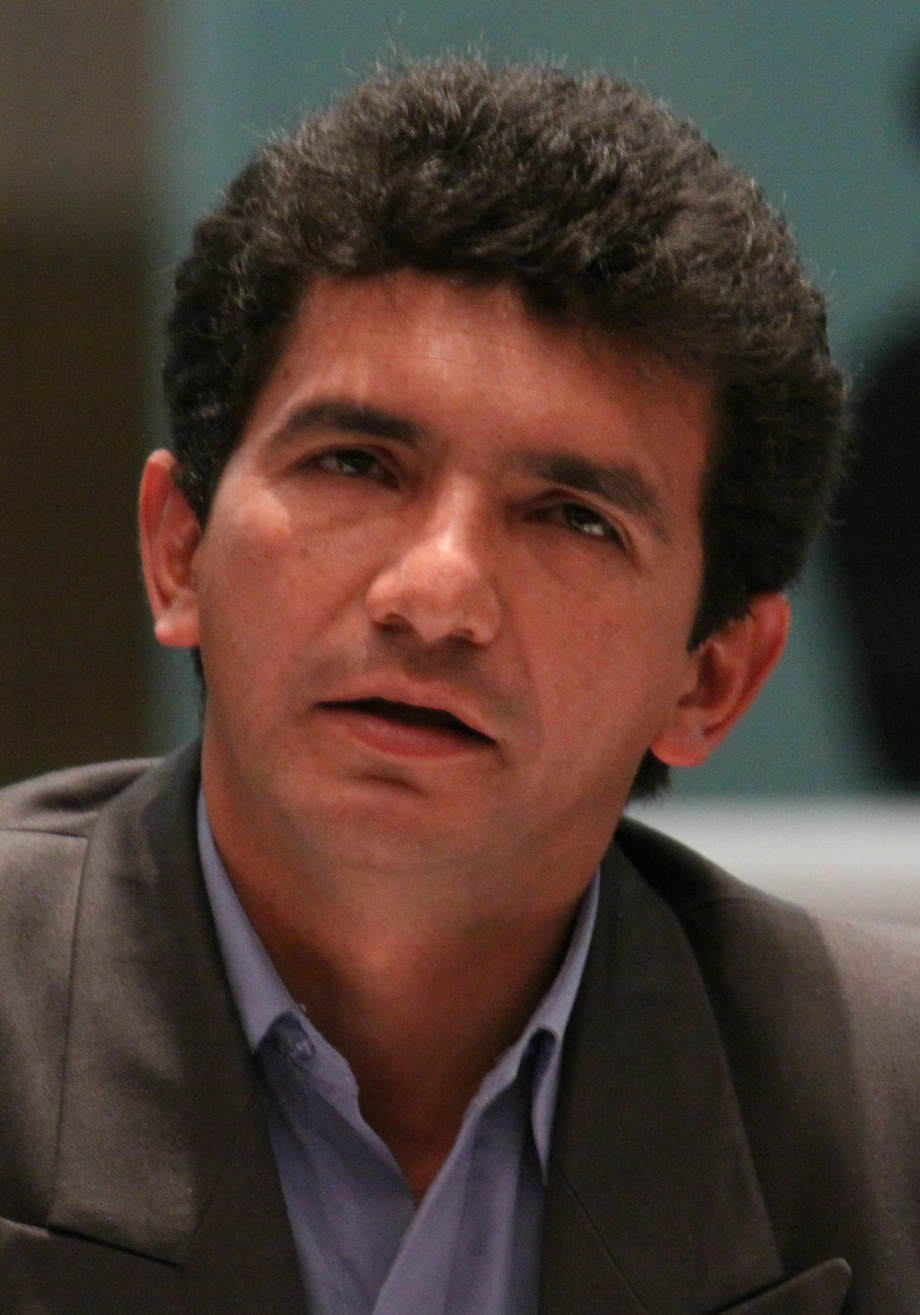

José Cléver Jiménez Cabrera (born 17 September 1969) is an Ecuadorian politician.

== Biography ==
Jiménez was the Prefect of the Zamora-Chinchipe Province from 2019 to 2023. He was a member of the National Assembly from 2009 to 2017. He was a member of the Pachakutik Party during his parliamentary career.

During the 2013–2014 National Assembly session, his parliamentary assistant was journalist Fernando Villavicencio. During this time, Jiménez and Villavicencio accused President Rafael Correa of having ordered an armed incursion at a hospital during a police revolt in September 2010. He was sued by Correa for libel and had an arrest warrant against him. Instead of turning himself in, he hid in the Amazon region until his sentence expired.
