= Julio Martínez (weightlifter) =

Puerto Rican weightlifter

Personal information
- Nationality: Puerto Rican
- Born: 15 May 1949 (age 77)

Sport
- Sport: Weightlifting

Julio Martínez (born 15 May 1949) is a Puerto Rican weightlifter. He competed at the 1972 Summer Olympics and the 1976 Summer Olympics.
