= Misión Verdad =

Venezuelan news website

- Website type: News website
- Available in: Spanish
- Headquarters: {{{location_country}}}
- Website: misionverdad.com
- Launched: 2012/2013

Misión Verdad (lit. 'Mission Truth') is a Venezuelan government-aligned news and opinion website.

== History and management ==
Misión Verdad was founded between 2012 and 2013. It is directed by Venezuelan journalist Gustavo Borges Revilla. The outlet's source of funding is unknown, and it has opaque ownership. In 2019, editor-in-chief William Serafino stated Misión Verdad was independent and funded through donations. According to a 2024 DFRLab report, Jorge Arreaza, Nicolás Maduro's former Minister of Foreign Affairs, is close to Misión Verdad's editorial team.

In 2015, 2016 and 2019, Misión Verdad received the National Journalism Prize awarded by Venezuela's Ministry of Communication and Information.

== Content ==
Misión Verdad's content has been described as ideologically Chavista and Venezuelan government propaganda. Part of the website is dedicated to contradicting independent media narratives. Amnesty International described it in 2022 as one of the outlets that most frequently carried out stigmatization against Venezuelans who would later be detained by security forces, alongside Con El Mazo Dando and Lechuguinos.

Misión Verdad frames its mission as refuting false or unjustified discourse against the Venezuelan government. Its content has been promoted by the Venezuelan government and is often cited by Venezuelan state media, as well as by international media such as Iran's HispanTV and Lebanon's Al Mayadeen. The Iran-aligned Samuel Robinson Institute think tank is affiliated with Misión Verdad.
