= Jean-Guy Allard =

Canadian journalist

- Born: 1948/02/13; Shawinigan, Quebec
- Died: August 16, 2016 (aged 68); Havana, Cuba
- Occupation: Journalist

Jean-Guy Allard (february 13, 1948 – August 16, 2016) was a Canadian journalist, who worked as an editor and reporter for Le Journal de Montréal and Le Journal de Québec from 1971 to 2000. He retired to Cuba, and later wrote for Granma. He wrote several books, including one on Robert Ménard and Reporters without Borders, and one on Luis Posada Carriles.

== Books ==
- (with Marie-Dominique Bertuccioli), Le dossier Robert Ménard: pourquoi Reporters sans frontières (RSF) s'acharne sur Cuba, Montreal/Paris: Lanctôt éditeur, 2004
- La filière terroriste du FBI, Timéli (Ginebra), 2005
- Posada Carriles, cuarenta años de terror, Editora Politica (La Habana), 2006
- Washington - Miami: la conexión terrorista del FBI, Editora Politica (La Habana), 2008
- (with Eva Golinger), La Agresión Permanente: USAID, NED y CIA, Caracas: Ministerio del Poder Poder Popular para la Comunicación y la Información, 2009 (Review in Spanish)
