= Aporrea =

Venezuelan left-wing news and opinion website

- Website: www.aporrea.org
- Launched: May 2002
- Current status: Active

Aporrea is a Venezuelan website that publishes news and opinions from the point of view of supporters of former president Hugo Chávez and the Bolivarian Revolution. It ranks as the fourth most visited local political site in the country, according to site metrics Alexa.com, and it claims to be the first among local independent left-leaning outlets. Most of the site's content was supportive of the political changes promoted by late president Hugo Chávez, but in recent years, it has content critical of the current government led by Chávez's protégé Nicolás Maduro, turning it into a "gathering place for dissidence within chavismo".

== History ==
Aporrea was created after the 2002 Venezuelan coup d'état attempt to "defend the gains of the 1999 Constitution of the Bolivarian Republic of Venezuela and the will of the people". The site was created by Gonzalo Gómez and Martin Sánchez, the latter of which withdrew in 2004 to take up a post as diplomat for the Venezuelan government.

Since 2010, the Venezuelan government stopped contracting advertisement on the site, forcing it to run commercial ads. Advertising on the site remains free for cooperatives, small businesses and NGOs.

In 2019, Gonzalo Gómez declared that "Maduro deserves to be recalled". According to Gomez, Aporrea's role as an independent left wing outlet is pivotal, as content critical of government policies "have no space in State owned media".

== Censorship ==
Aporrea is currently censored in Venezuelan government owned Internet service providers. Since February 2019, the site is unreachable to users of Cantv and Movilnet, the State ISPs, which make serve the majority of the country's population. Other local independent media outlets are also affected.

The site has been the target of state sponsored attacks aimed at silencing it. "Even media claiming to maintain a neutral position, such as Aporrea, were attacked," said Freedom House in one of its reports on Internet freedom in Venezuela.

On 23 February 2023, Aporrea was the subject of a DNS block, which was denounced by its director, Gonzalo Gómez.

== Critical reception ==
Venezuelan government figures have publicly criticized the site. Diosdado Cabello, the current president of the National Constituent Assembly described Aporrea and its columnists as traitors. "Write everything you want, but enough of betrayals! You can write everything you want, nobody forbids it, you are within your rights, but define yourself [politically]."

According to Manuel Laya of the Communist Party of Venezuela, Aporrea no longer serves its original purpose and was an instrument of the "fifth column" to hinder the flow of information.

According to the Anti-Defamation League (ADL), Aporrea has "a record of promoting antisemitic conspiracies" and presented multiple articles which they found offensive in their 2014 Antisemitismo en Venezuela report. The Simon Wiesenthal Center also criticized what it considers anti-Semitic commentary on the website. Several other organizations have also criticized the website citing anti-Semitic ideas. Aporrea criticised the Anti-Defamation League and the Simon Wiesenthal Cente for not contacting Aporrea to ask for the content to be removed and using Aporrea's unintentional errors and omissions to attack the website's editorial stance on the actions of the Israeli government.
