= Julio Martinez Acosta =

Ecuadorian Lieutenant and politician

- Born: August 18, 1879
- Died: February 17, 1957 (Age 78); Quito, Ecuador
- Known for: Military Lieutenant Colonel

Julio Martinez Acosta (August 17, 1879 - February 17, 1957) was an Ecuadorian Lieutenant and politician. He served as the youngest military leader under Ecuador President, Eloy Alfaro.

== Background ==
Lieutenant Colonel Don Julio Martinez Acosta was born in Huaca, Carchi Province in Ecuador, on August 17, 1879. His parents were prominent parliamentarians, his father being Dr. David Martínez de Orbe and his mother being Ms. Mercedes Acosta Calderón.

He spent his early years in a rural area. At the age of 15, he joined the military, and at the age of 27, he had attained the rank of Lieutenant Colonel. Acosta commanded several battalions and participated to the Liberal Revolution of 1895, for which he was later imprisoned. He was also the first assistant of General Rafael Arellano, and served as the Undersecretary of the Ministry of War and Navy during the second administration of president Eloy Alfaro.

In his civilian life, Acosta served several terms as President of the City Council of Tulcán, Carchi Province. He also served as governor and police commissioner of the Carchi Province.

Acosta died in Quito, Ecuador on February 17, 1957, at the age of 78.

The school Escuela Julio Martinez Acosta in Tulcán is named after Acosta.
