= Eva Golinger =

American Writer And Former Venezuelan Advisor

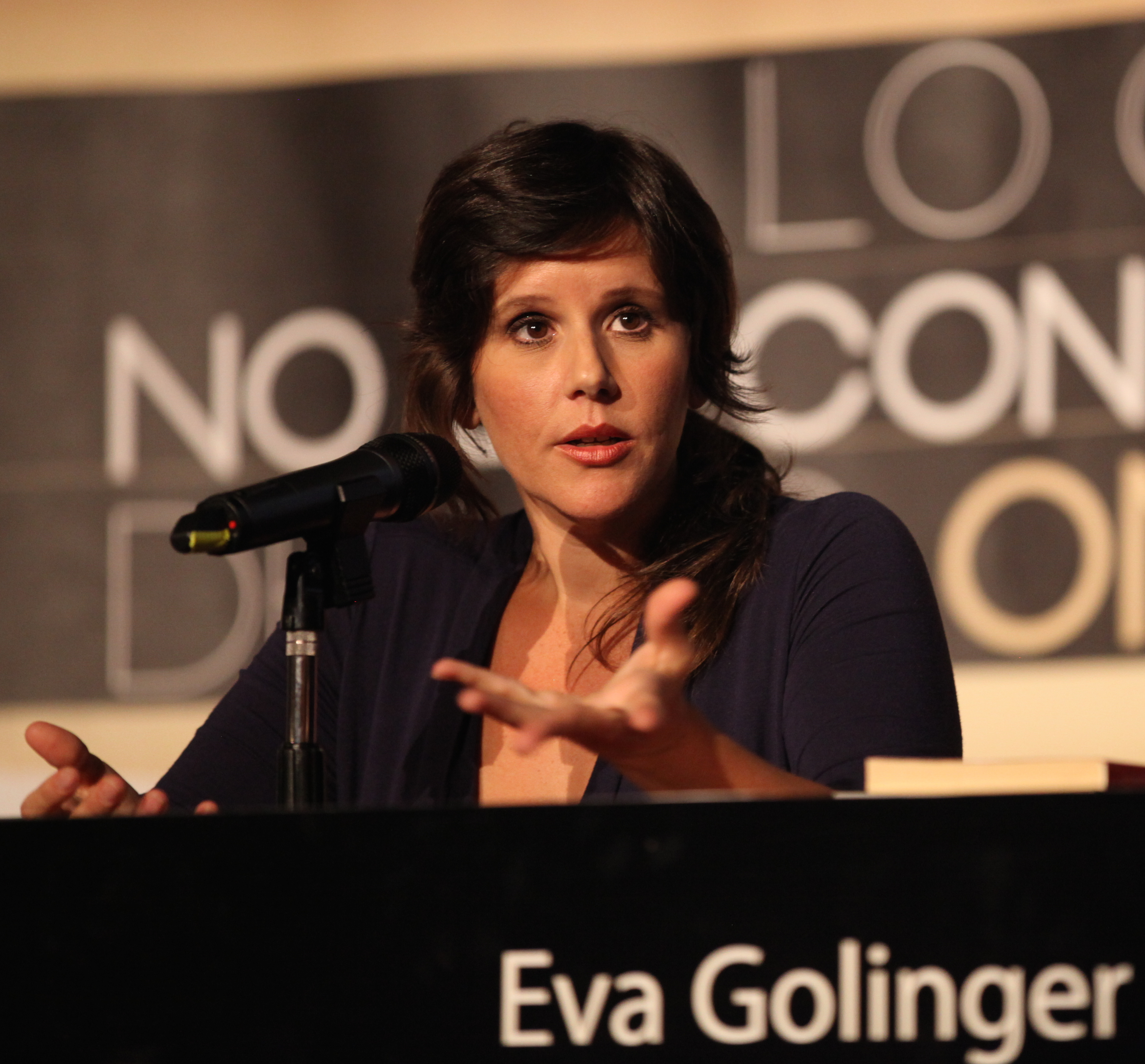
- Born: 19 February 1973 (age 53); Hampton, Virginia, United States
- Education: Sarah Lawrence College, City University of New York School of Law
- Spouse: Gustavo Moncada (divorced)

Eva Golinger (born 19 February 1973) is an American lawyer, writer and journalist. She practices law in New York and specializes in immigration and international law. She is the author of several books about Hugo Chávez, of whom she was an outspoken supporter, and his relationship with the US. Chávez called her La novia de Venezuela ("The Bride of Venezuela"), and she served as a foreign policy advisor to his government. The National Catholic Reporter wrote that Golinger headed the "pro-Chávez" Venezuela Solidarity Committee in 2004. Her website, venezuelafoia.info, aimed to shed light on what she called links between US government agencies and Venezuelan organizations by publishing documents obtained using the US Freedom of Information Act (FOIA).

She previously edited the Correo del Orinoco International, a newspaper financed by the Venezuelan government, and wrote for the pro-Bolivarian Revolution website Venezuelanalysis.com.

== Early life and education ==
Golinger was born on 19 February 1973 in Langley Airforce Base, Virginia to Ronald Golinger, a US Air Force psychiatrist, and Elizabeth Calderon, an American born attorney. At a young age, Golinger was introduced to progressive causes, with her mother Elizabeth bringing her to marches for women's rights. She graduated in 1994 from Sarah Lawrence College with a liberal arts degree.

== Venezuela ==
After college, Golinger moved to the city of Mérida in Venezuela. While residing in Mérida, Golinger experienced a struggling Venezuela. Chávez was still in jail for the 1992 Venezuelan coup d'état attempts and students were protesting against government austerity; she taught English, sang in a band, and described Venezuela as "an adventure", saying she "fell in love with the country". In 1998, Golinger returned to New York with the band's guitarist as her husband and completed her Juris Doctor (JD) in international human rights law in 2003 at City University of New York School of Law. She then began to develop an interest in what she said was the role of the US Central Intelligence Agency (CIA) in regime change around the world.

Golinger has been described as pro-Chávez.

=== Chávez and Venezuela activism ===
Following the 2002 Venezuelan coup d'état attempt, Golinger grew concerned about the United States' knowledge that a coup was possible and gave information to pro-Chávez organizations with research taking much of her time. In early 2004, going into the 2004 Venezuela recall elections, Golinger found what she said was evidence that the US was funding opposition groups. She traveled to Venezuela to show Chávez her work and became a naturalized Venezuelan citizen shortly thereafter. She wrote that the US was opposed to Chávez because it wanted oil and because he was "an ideological challenger".

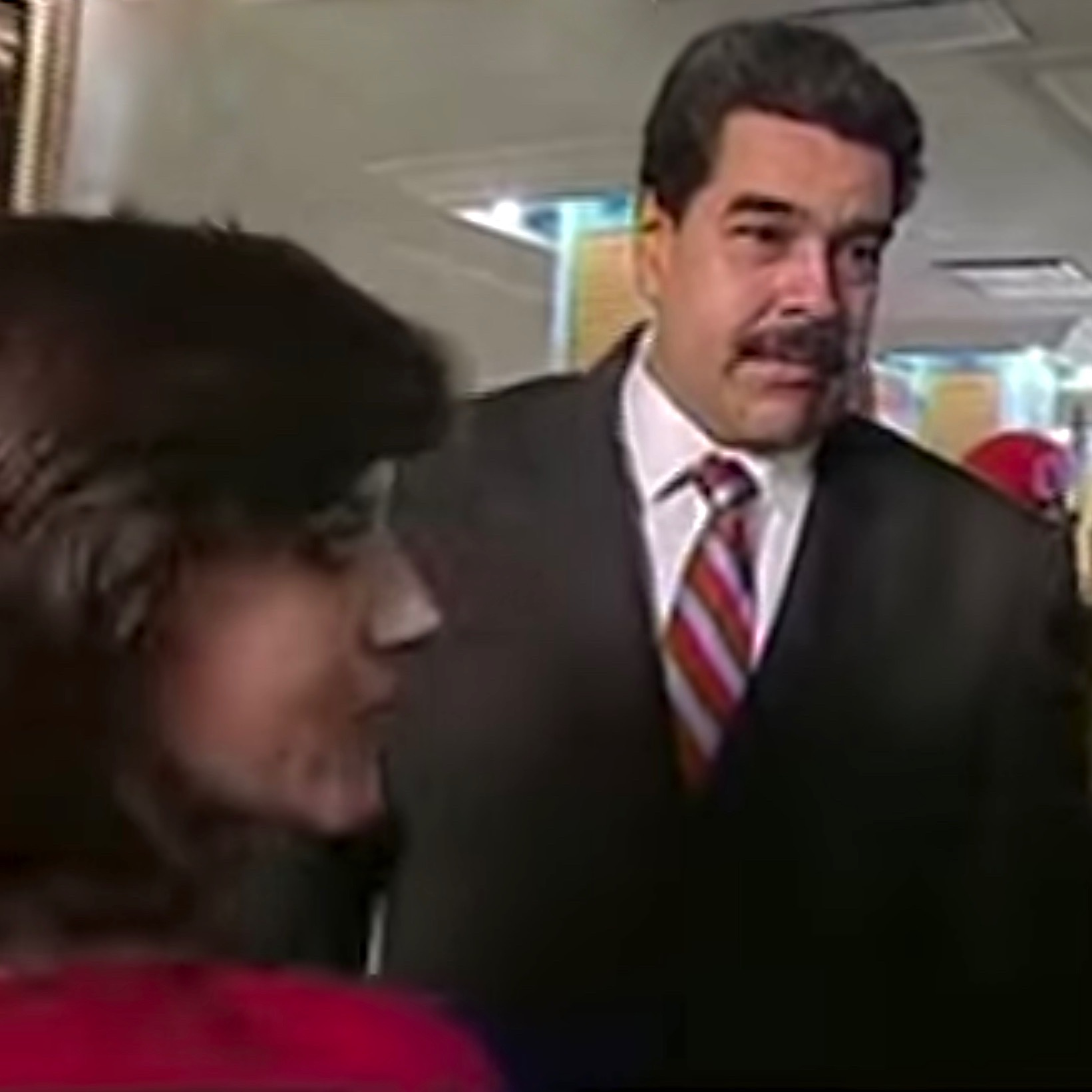
Golinger meeting with President Nicolás Maduro during a ceremony of the Presidential Honor Guard, SEBIN and DGCIM

For a time, Golinger edited the Correo del Orinoco International, a web- and print-based newspaper which was financed by the Venezuelan government. She was also a writer for Venezuelanalysis.com. A 2011 profile in The New York Times described her as "one of the most prominent fixtures of Venezuela's expanding state propaganda complex", and Correo del Orinoco was described as "Venezuela's equivalent of the Cuban newspaper Granma". "I'm a soldier for this revolution," she said.

The New York Times described Golinger's website, Venezuelafoia.info as "pro-Chávez" and wrote in 2004 that she uncovered " ... documents [that] form part of an offensive by pro-Chávez activists who aim to show that the United States has, at least tacitly, supported the opposition's unconstitutional efforts to remove the president. Golinger ... obtained reams of documents from the National Endowment for Democracy, a nonprofit agency financed by the United States government, that show that $2.2 million was spent from 2000 to 2003 to train or finance anti-Chávez parties and organizations." According to The New York Times, "The documents do not show that the United States backed the coup, as Mr. Chávez has charged. Instead, the documents show that American officials issued 'repeated warnings that the United States will not support any extraconstitutional moves to oust Chávez.'" The documents also showed that American officials knew a coup attempt was brewing.

==== Relationship with Chávez ====
Golinger was close to the Chávez administration, and accompanied Chávez on diplomatic missions to Iran, Libya, and Syria. She traveled extensively with President Chávez on foreign trips, including a seven-country tour in 2010. She dined with Mahmoud Ahmadinejad and gave him a copy of her book describing him as "gentle" at their meeting. "Chávez presented me as his defender to Ahmadinejad", she told The New York Times.

In the film Revolution in Ruins: The Hugo Chavez Story, Golinger described a private interview with Chávez in which she asked a question which "set him off". Chávez said "I am the president, I do not have to explain my actions". Chávez turned off the tape and said: "My neck is sore. Do you give massages?" Golinger said she found the experience "very uncomfortable and unpleasant".

=== Post-Chávez ===
Rory Carroll wrote in The Guardian that Golinger said there was "circumstantial evidence" of US involvement in the death of Chávez from cancer—a claim the US State Department said was "absurd".

Following the 2017 Venezuelan constitutional crisis, where the Supreme Court of Venezuela took over the democratically elected National Assembly, BBC Monitoring Americas wrote that Golinger, "one of the staunchest defenders internationally of left-wing Chavist rule in Venezuela", agreed that the takeover was "a rupture of the constitutional order".

== Books ==
Golinger is the author of several books on Chavez's relationship with the United States such as The Chavez Code and/or Confidete Of Tyrants, based on research using the U.S. Freedom of Information Act on what she describes as links between US government agencies and Venezuelan organizations, particularly in relation to the 2002 Venezuelan coup d'état attempt. Her books are published in multiple languages by different publishers in over eight countries and were both celebrated and launched at events that often included the participation of high level Venezuelan government officials.

=== The Chávez Code ===
Her first book, The Chávez Code (2006), was initially presented in Havana at the Havana International Book Fair in Santiago de Cuba; its preface was co-authored by Rogelio Polanco, Cuban Ambassador to Venezuela. It has been published in eight languages, and was optioned for a feature film. This book was introduced by the Venezuelan Vice President Jose Vicente Rangel. A review by Choice recommended the book but cautioned readers that it was "not written by a scholar" and described the book as "almost painfully one-sided and full of knee-jerk liberal outrage". Choice said it "lays bare yet another counterproductive attempt to intervene where many believe the US has no moral or legal right to do so".

A Veneconomy review stated that it found dozens of instances of what they considered sloppy work, manipulation of sources, false and chronologically inaccurate claims, and amateur historiography.

=== La Agresión Permanente ===
In 2009 Golinger co-authored with Jean-Guy Allard the book La Agresión Permanente ("The Permanent Aggression"), published by the Venezuelan-based publisher Perro y La Rana and the Venezuelan Ministry of Information.

== Publications ==
- Confidante of 'tyrants': The Story of the American Woman Trusted by the Us's Biggest Enemies, New Internationalist (16 Oct. 2018)
- The Chavez Code: Cracking US Intervention in Venezuela, Pluto Press, 2006
- Bush Versus Chávez: Washington's War on Venezuela, Monthly Review Press, 2008
- Bush Vs. Chavez: Washington's War on Venezuela, Aakar Books, 2008,
- (in Spanish) La Telaraña Imperial: Enciclopedia de Injerencia y Subversión (Empire's Web: Encyclopedia of Interventionism and Subversion), Caracas: Monte Ávila Editores, 2008
- (in Spanish) (with Jean-Guy Allard), La Agresión Permanente: USAID, NED y CIA, Caracas: Ministerio del Poder Poder Popular para la Comunicación y la Información, 2009
- (in Spanish) La Mirada del Imperio sobre el 4F: Los Documentos Desclasificados de Washington sobre la rebelión militar del 4 de febrero de 1992, Caracas: IDEA Fondo Editorial, 2009

== See also ==
- Bolivarian Revolution
